= 1874 in Denmark =

- Decades: 1850s; 1860s; 1870s; 1880s; 1890s
- See also: Other events of 1874; List of years in Denmark

Events from the year 1874 in Denmark.

== Incumbents ==
- Monarch – Christian IX
- Prime minister – Ludvig Holstein-Holsteinborg (until 14 July), Christen Andreas Fonnesbech

== Events ==
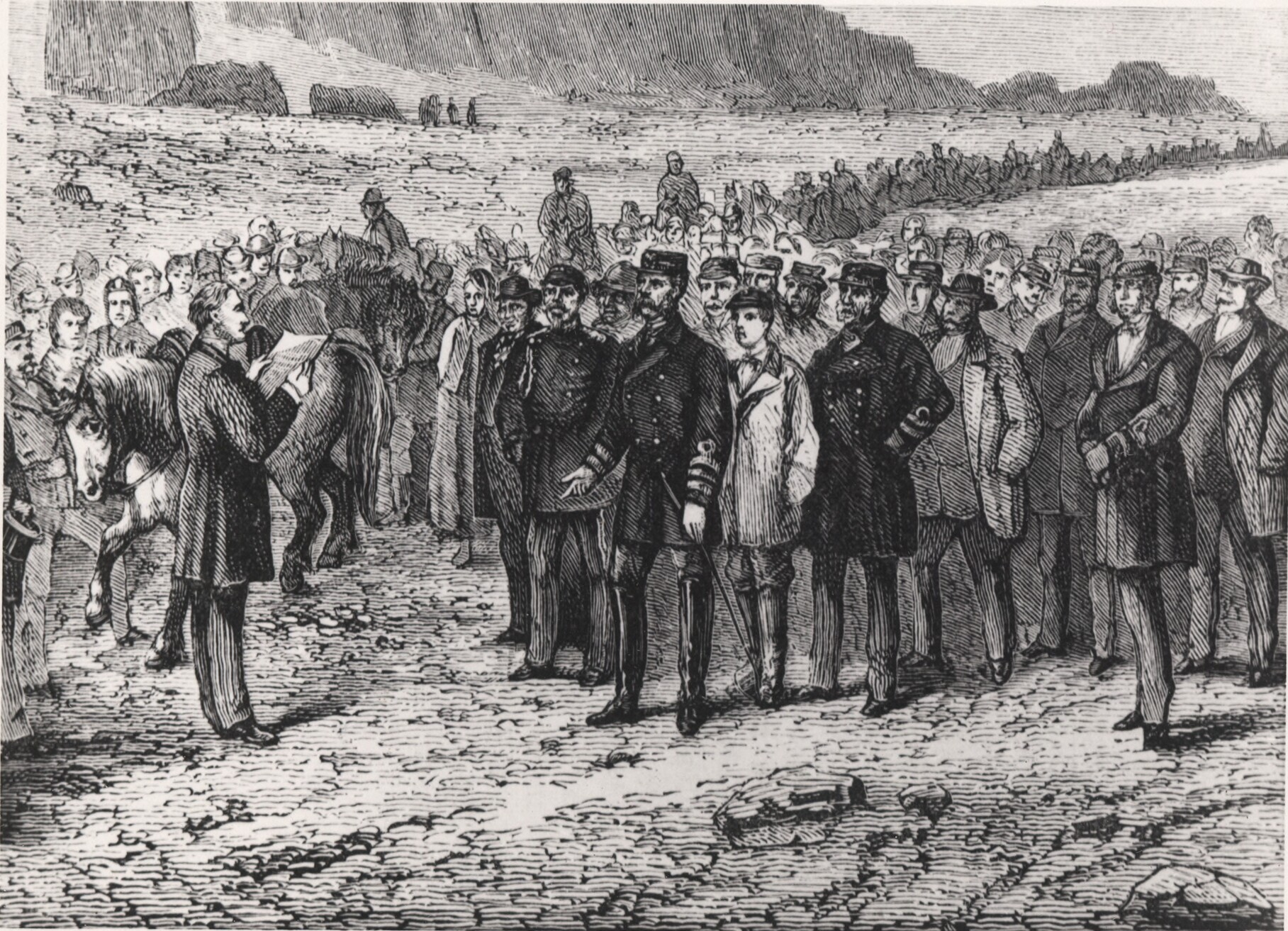
7 August: Islændernes adresse overrækkes Christian 9 på Thingvalla.

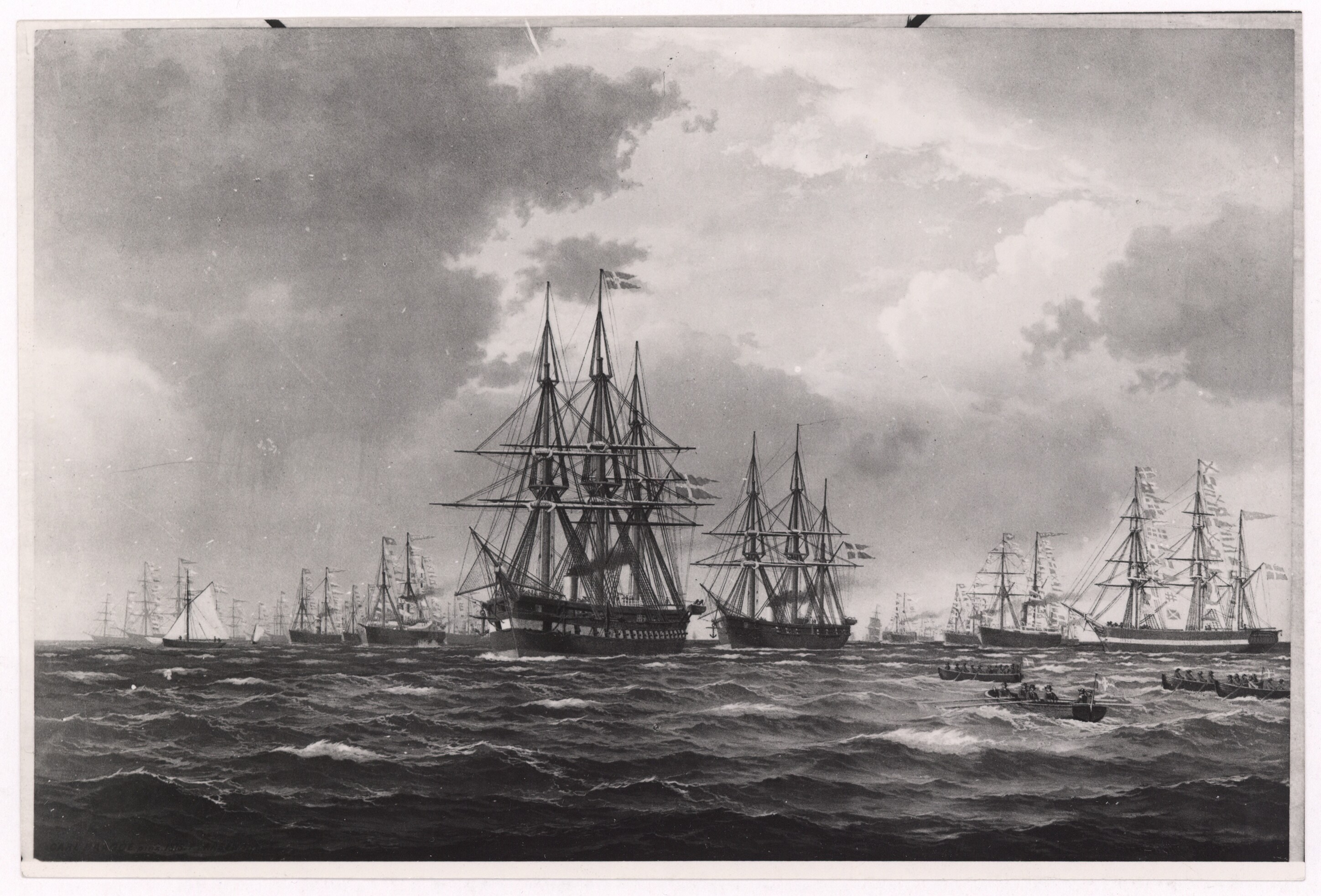
23 August: Christian IX returns to Copenhagen on board the frigate Jylland.

- 1 January – The first issue of fashion journal Nordisk Mønster-Tidende, present-day women's magazine Femina, is published.
- 5 January – Iceland is granted a constitution and limited home rule within the Danish realm.
- 14 July – Prime Minister Ludvig Holstein-Holsteinborg resigns, and is replaced by Christen Andreas Fonnesbech.
- 15 August – Esbjerg Harbour is inaugurated.
- 15 October – The Old Stage, the original of the Royal Danish Theatre, is inaugurated.
- 23 August – Christian IX returns to Copenhagen from his visit to Iceland on board the frigate HDMS Jylland.
- 16 December – Prince Valdemar's confirmation in Fredensborg Palace Chapel.

=== Date unknown ===
- Louis Poulsen, a lighting manufacturing company, is founded.
- The 25 øre coin is introduced on the decimalisation of the krone. It remains in circulation until 2008, when it is demonetised as the lowest-denomination coin in the country.
- Dalum Papirfabrik is established on Odense Å.

== Births ==
=== January–March ===
- 10 January – Louis Larsen, gymnast, silver medalist at the 1906 Intercalated Games (died 1950)
- 22 January – Frants Nielsen, sport shooter, competitor at the 1912 Summer Olympics (died 1961)
- 31 January – Harald Tandrup, writer (died 1964)
- 5 February – Gunnar Asgeir Sadolin, businessman (died 1955)
- 20 February – Ebbe Kornerup, writer and painter (died 1957)
- 1 March
  - August Hesselbo, pharmaceutical botanist and bryologist (died 1952)
  - Jens Lind, apothecary, botanist and mycologist (died 1939)
- 22 March – Ove Paulsen, botanist, professor at the Pharmaceutical College in Copenhagen 1920–1947 (died 1947)

=== April–June ===
- 12 May – Sigrid Kähler, artist (died 1923)
- 15 May – Astrid Rosing Sawyer, businesswoman and translator (born 1954)
- 1 June – Peter Hertz, art historian (died 1939)
- 19 June – Peder Oluf Pedersen, engineer and physicist, IEEE Medal of Honor recipient in 1930 (died 1941)
- 22 June – Viggo Jensen, weightlifter, shooter, gymnast and athlete, Olympic gold medalist (Denmark's first) and silver medalist in weightlifting at the 1896 Summer Olympics (died 1930)

=== July–September ===
Esben Smed* 23 July – Jens Peter Dahl-Jensen, sculptor and ceramist, model master of Bing & Grøndahl 1897–1917, artistic director of Norden 1917–1925 (died 1960)

- 13 August – Anna Wulff, educator (died 1935)
- 18 August – Christian Pedersen, sport shooter, competitor at the 1908 Summer Olympics (died 1957)

=== October–December ===
- 4 October – Agnes Smidt, painter and cultural activist (died 1952)
- 22 October – Thora Daugaard, women's rights activist, pacifist, editor and translator (died 1951)
- 1 November – Karl Albert Hasselbalch, physician and chemist, pioneer in the use of pH measurement in medicine (died 1962)
- 15 November – August Krogh, professor at the department of zoophysiology at the University of Copenhagen 1916–1945, recipient of the Nobel Prize in Physiology or Medicine in 1920 (died 1949)
- 1 December – Johannes Friis-Skotte, politician, Minister of Public Works (Transport) 1924–1926 and 1929–1935 (died 1946)
- 7 December – Carl Cohn Haste, blind pianist, organist and composer, music teacher at the Royal Blind Institute, first president of the Danish Association of the Blind (died 1939)
- 23 December – Viggo Wiehe, stage and film actor (died 1956)

== Deaths ==
=== January–March ===
- 20 February – Holger Roed, painter (born 1846)
- 6 March – Louise Rasmussen, ballet dancer and stage actor (born 1815)
- 20 March – Hans Christian Lumbye, composer of waltzes, polkas, mazurkas and galops, including the Champagne Galop (born 1810)
- 28 March – Peter Andreas Hansen, astronomer, Copley Medal recipient in 1850 (born 1795)

=== October – December ===
- 1 October – Ludvig Bødtcher, lyric poet (born 1793)
- 9 November – Just Mathias Thiele, writer and art historian (born 1795)
- 31 December – Johan Adam Schwartz, turner (born 1820)
