= 1939 in Denmark =

- Decades: 1910s; 1920s; 1930s; 1940s; 1950s
- See also: Other events of 1939; List of years in Denmark

Events from the year 1939 in Denmark.

== Incumbents ==
- Monarch – Christian X
- Prime minister – Thorvald Stauning

== Events ==
- 29 November – Erling Dahl-Iversen gives the last lecture at the Royal Danish Academy of Surgery on Bredgade in Copenhagen.

== Sport ==
=== Badminton ===
- 12 March – Tage Madsen wins gold in Men's Singles at the All England Badminton Championships.

=== Cycling ===
- Karel Kaers (BEL) and Omer De Bruycker (BEL) win the Six Days of Copenhagen six-day track cycling race.

=== Football ===
- 5 March – Næstved Boldklub is founded.
- B 93 wins their seventh Danish football championship by winning the 1938–39 Danish Championship League.

== Births ==
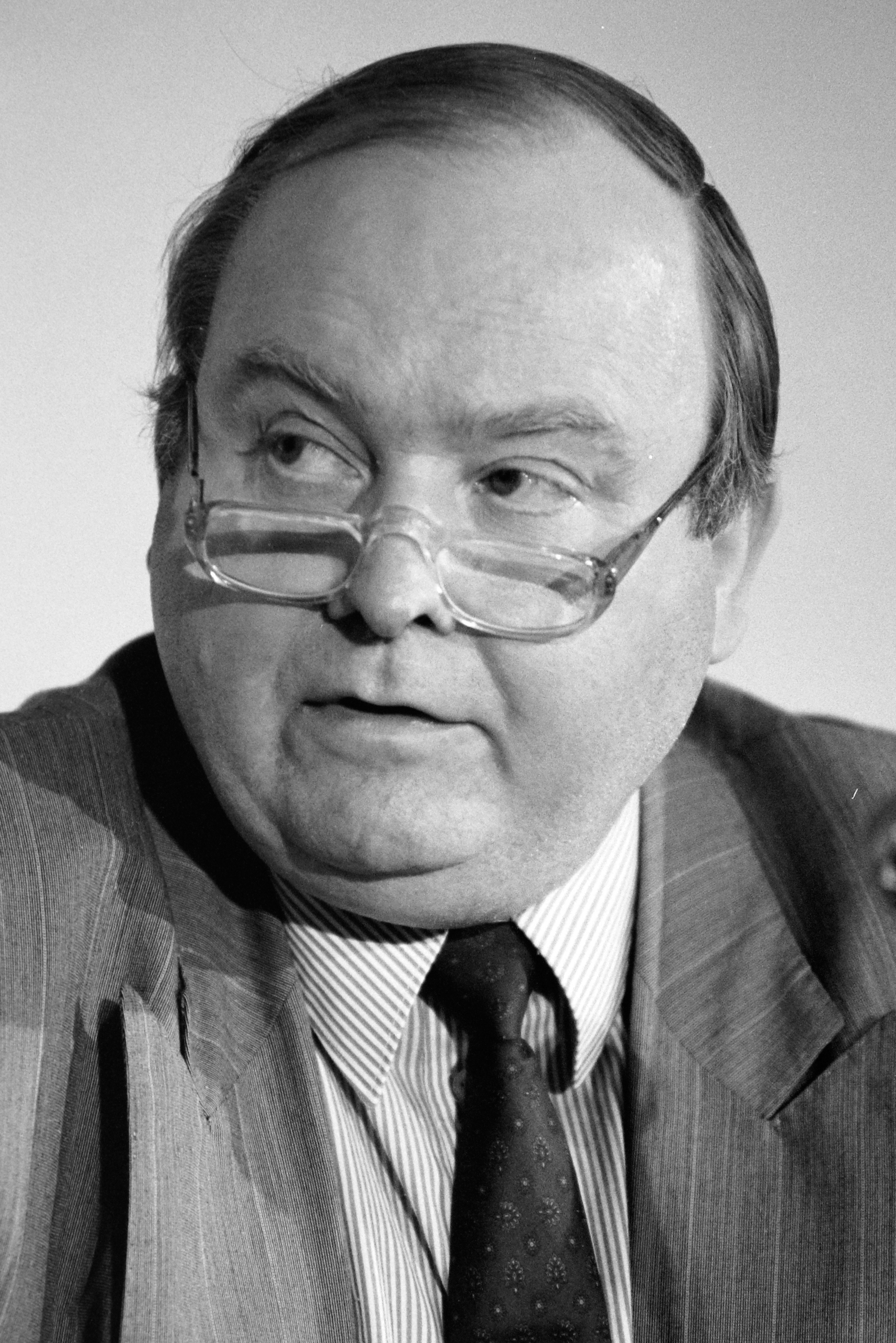
Henning Christophersen.

=== January–March ===
- 17 January – Niels Helveg Petersen, politician (died 2017)
- 22 January – Jørgen Garde, Danish admiral (d. 1996)
- 1 February – Dario Campeotto, performer (died 2023)
- 12 February – Gerd Grubb, mathematician
- 27 March – Per Golst, film director and producer (died 2025)

=== April–June ===
- 7 April – Per Pinstrup-Andersen, economist

=== July–September ===
- 13 July – John Danielsen, Danish football midfielder
- 5 August – Flemming Topsøe, mathematician
- 3 September – Vivi Bach, actress and model (died 2013)

=== October–December ===
- 2 November – Svend Åge Madsen, novelist
- 8 November – Henning Christophersen, politician and EU commissioner (died 2016)
- 15 November – Erik Hansen, canoeist (died 2014)

== Deaths ==
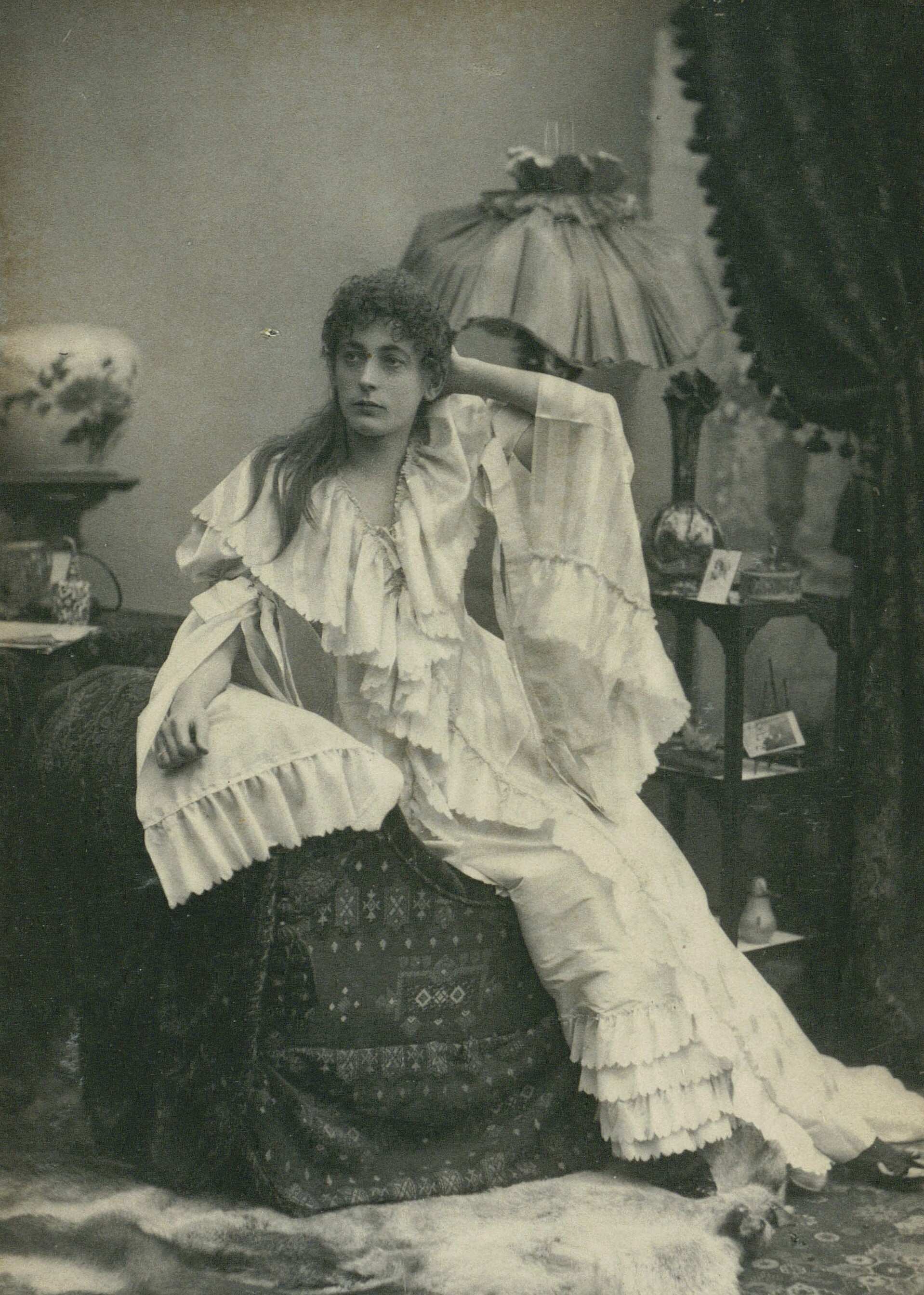
Dagmar Orlamundt.

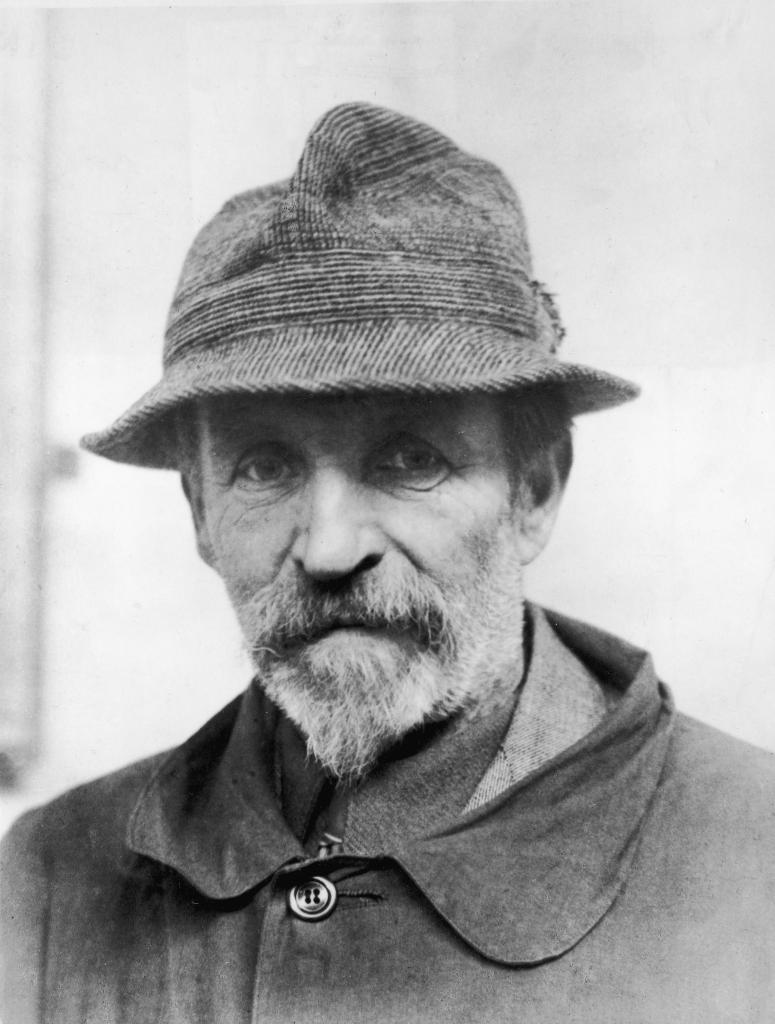
Fritz Syberg.

=== January–March ===
- 10 January – Dagmar Orlamundt, actress (born 1863)
- 14 January – Prince Valdemar of Denmark (born 1858)
- 12 February – S. P. L. Sørensen, chemist (born 1868)
- 26 March – Peter Hertz, art historian (born 1874)

=== April–June ===
- 7 April – Mary Steen, photographer (born 1856)
- 24 April – Harald Scavenius, diplomat and politician, Minister of Foreign Affairs 1920–22 (born 1873)
- 4 June – Carl Cohn Haste, blind pianist, organist and composer, music teacher at the Royal Blind Institute, first president of the Danish Association of the Blind (born 1874)

=== July–September ===
- 3 August – August Enna, composer (born 1859)
- 4 August – Aage Giødesen, painter (born 1863)

=== October–December ===
- 4 October – Jens Lind, apothecary, botanist and mycologist (born 1874)
- 16 October – Ludolf Nielsen, composer, violinist, conductor and pianist (born 1876)
- 20 December – Fritz Syberg, artist and illustrator (born 1862)
