= 1877 in Denmark =

- Decades: 1850s; 1860s; 1870s; 1880s; 1890s
- See also: Other events of 1877; List of years in Denmark

Events from the year 1877 in Denmark.

== Incumbents ==
- Monarch – Christian IX
- Prime minister – J. B. S. Estrup

== Events ==
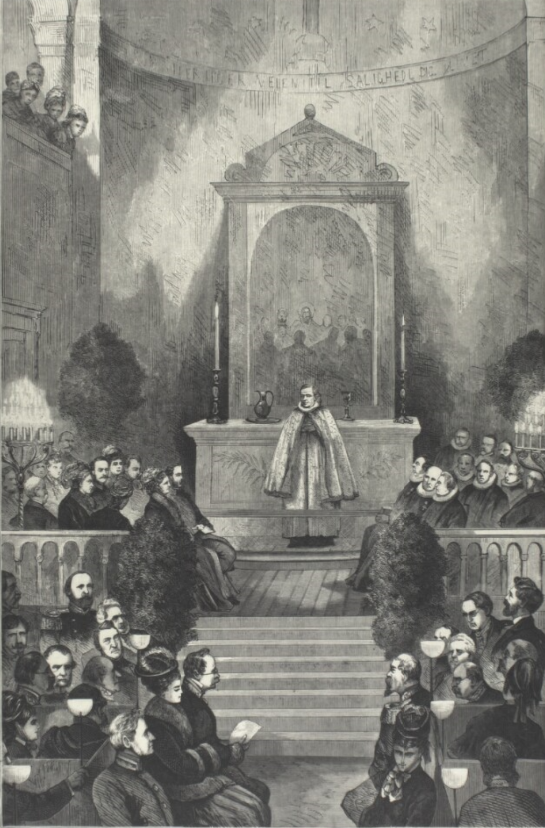
18 February: Inauguration of St. Paul's Church in Copenhagen

January

- 7 January – The weekly Illustreret Familie Journal, now Familie Journalen, is published for the first time.

February

15 February – St. Paul's Church in Copenhagen is completed and opens for the first time.[2]

- 18 February – St. Paul's Church in Copenhagen is inaugurated.

April

- 12 April – The Estrup government's adoption of a temporary national budget after dissolving Rigsdagen sets off the political struggle between Landstinget and Folketinget known as provisorietiden, "the provisional era". The opposition introduces their so-called visnepolitik, "whithering politics".

August

- 12 August – Six houses are washed away when Lønstrup is hit by a thunderstorm and torrential rain.

December

- 1 December – The Aarhus–Ryomgård section of the Grenaa Line railway is opened.

=== Date unknown ===
- Aarsdale Windmill is completed.
- Nielsine Nielsen and Johanne Gleerup are admitted to the University of Copenhagen as Denmark's first female university students.

== Births ==
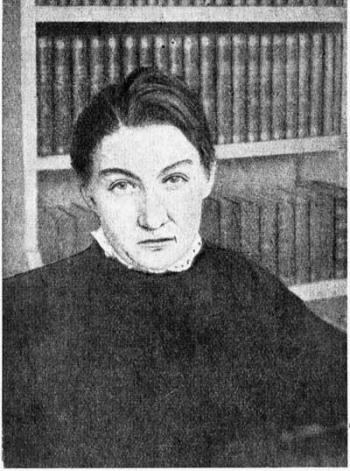
Ellen Jørgen.

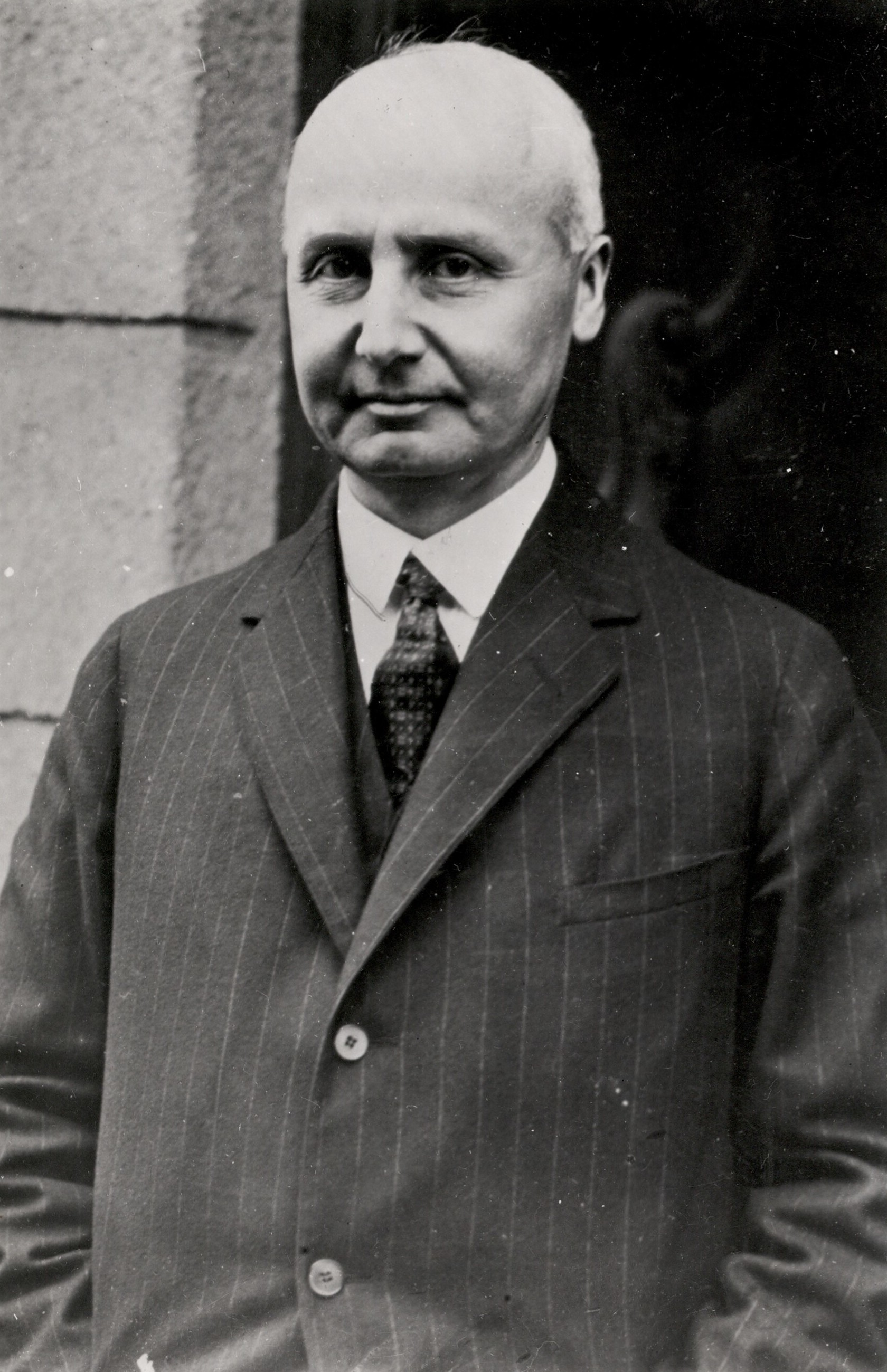
Erik Scavenius.

=== January–March ===
- 2 January – Johannes Schmidt, biologist credited with the 1920 discovery that eels migrate to the Sargasso Sea to spawn (died 1933)
- 12 February – Holger Scheuermann, surgeon after whom Scheuermann's disease is named (died 1960)
- 20 February – Albert Kongsbak, painter (died 1958)
- 28 February – Peder Møller, violinist and music teacher (died 1940)
- 6 March – Ellen Jørgensen, historian and librarian (died 1948)
- 7 March – Thorvald Ellegaard, track racing cyclist (died 1954)
- 15 March – Axel Frische, screenwriter, actor and film director (died 1956)
- 22 March – Einar Ambt, architect (died 1928)

=== April–June ===
- 11 April – Carl Alstrup, actor and film director (died 1943)
- 1 April – Valdemar Henckel, businessman, company founder (died 1953)
- 28 April – Frederik Draiby, architect, first city designer of Aarhus (died 1966)
- 29 May – Jens Hajslund, Olympic sport shooter, bronze medalist in team free rifle at the 1912 Summer Olympics (died 1964)
- 8 June – Thorvald Aagaard, composer (died 1937)
- 27 June – Axel Høeg-Hansen, architect (died 1947)

=== July–September ===
- 1 July – Kay Schrøder, Olympic fencer, competitor at the 1920 Summer Olympics (died 1949)
- 13 July – Erik Scavenius, politician, Prime Minister of Denmark 1942–1943 (died 1962)
- 10 August – Harald Bergstedt, writer, novelist, playwright and poet (died 1965)
- 22 August – Henning Eiler Petersen, mycologist, botanist and marine botanist (died 1946)
- 5 September – Ove Jørgensen, classical scholar (died 1950)

=== October–December ===
- 2 December – Carl Manicus-Hansen, gymnast, silver medalist in the team event in gymnastics at the 1906 Intercalated Games (died 1960)

== Deaths ==
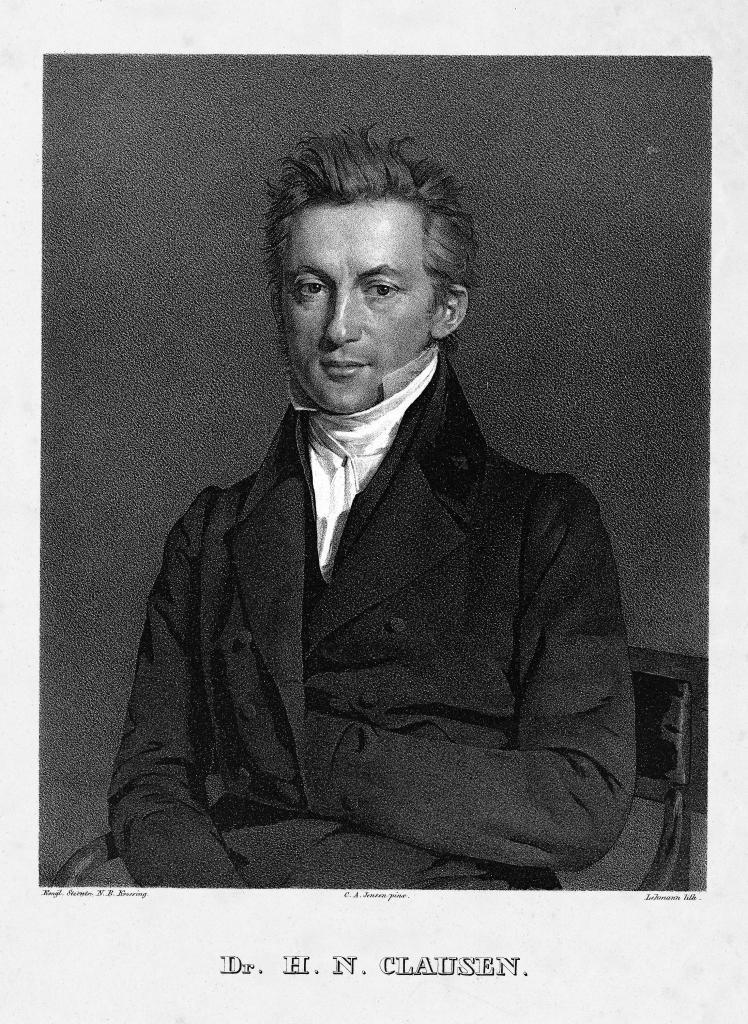
Henrik Nicolai Clausen.

=== January–March ===
- 30 January – Rudolph Rothe, landscape architect (born 1802)
- 26 February – Nicolai Jonathan Meinert, businessman (born 1791)
- 28 March – Henrik Nicolai Clausen, theologian and National Liberal Party politician (born in 1793)

=== April–June ===
- 25 April – Peter Faber, songwriter, telegraphy pioneer (born 1810)

=== October–December ===
- 12 October – Ole Bang, medical doctor (born 1788)
- 16 November – Oscar Alexander Ræder, writer (born 1844)
