= Kornerup =

Kornerup is a surname. Notable people with the surname include:

- Ann-Mari Kornerup, Swedish-Danish textile artist
- Ebbe Kornerup (1874–1957), Danish painter and writer
- Jacob Kornerup (1825–1913), Danish archaeologist and painter
- Ludvig Kornerup (1871–1946), Swedish football referee and manager
