= 1952 in Denmark =

- Decades: 1930s; 1940s; 1950s; 1960s; 1970s
- See also: Other events of 1952; List of years in Denmark

Events from the year 1952 in Denmark.

== Incumbents ==
- Monarch – Frederik IX
- Prime minister – Erik Eriksen

== Sports ==
=== Badminton ===
- 7–11 March – All England Badminton Championships
  - Tonny Ahm wins gold in Women's Singles at the All England Badminton Championships.
  - Tonny Ahm and Aase Schiøtt Jacobsen wins gold in Women's Doubles
  - Poul Holm and Tonny Ahm win gold in Mixed Doubles

=== Cycling ===
- Date unknown – Lucien Gillen (LUX) and Kay Werner Nielsen (DEN) win the Six Days of Copenhagen six-day track cycling race.

== Births ==
=== January–March ===
- 15 February – Jens Jørn Bertelsen, footballer
- 29 February – Orla Østerby, politician
- 19 March – Ole Rasmussen, footballer

=== April–June ===
- 3 April – Orla Hav, politician
- 4 April – Villy Søvndal, politician
- 27 April – Ole Svendsen, welterweight boxer
- 29 May – Pia Tafdrup, writer and poet
- 11 June – Anne Birgitte Lundholt, politician and businessperson
- 19 June – Poul Nesgaard, television personality, director of the National Film School of Denmark

=== July–September ===
- 8 July – Knud Arne Jürgensen, music historian
- 24 July – Carsten Jensen, author
- 14 August – Jeanette Oppenheim, lawyer and politician
- 21 September – Jens Nørskov, physicist

=== October–December ===
- 17 October – Thomas Rørdam, lawyer, judge
- 9 November – Michael Møller, diplomat
- 15 December – Allan Simonsen, footballer, 1977 European Footballer of the Year
- 23 December – Hans Abrahamsen, composer

== Deaths ==
- 18 April – Agnes Smidt, painter and cultural activist (born 1874)
- 22 May – Liva Weel, actress (born 1897)
- 4 June – Rasmus Harboe, sculptor (born 1868)
- 10 July – Rued Langgaard, composer and organist (born 1893)
- 7 November – Christian Nielsen, sailor, silver medallist at the 1924 Summer Olympics (born 1873)

=== Date unknown ===
- August Hesselbo, pharmaceutical botanist and bryologist (born 1874)
