= 1950 in Denmark =

- Decades: 1930s; 1940s; 1950s; 1960s; 1970s
- See also: Other events of 1950; List of years in Denmark

Events from the year 1950 in Denmark.

== Incumbents ==
- Monarch – Frederik IX
- Prime minister – Hans Hedtoft (until 30 October), Erik Eriksen

== Events ==
- 9 January – Denmark becomes one of the first European countries to recognize the People's Republic of China.
- 8 May – The Tollund Man is discovered.
- 14 March – The 1950 Danish local elections are held.
- 27 May – The Ministry of Defence is established.
- 5 September – The 1950 Danish Folketing election is held.
- November – The last Danish collaborator trial sentences are passed.

=== Date unknown ===
- The Colony of Greenland is formed through the merger of North Greenland and South Greenland.

== Sports ==
- 20–27 August– Denmark wins one gold medal, one silver medal and one bronze medal at the 1947 European Aquatics Championships.

=== Badminton ===
- 1–4 March – All England Badminton Championships
  - Tonny Ahm wins gold in Women's Single at the All England Badminton Championships.
  - Jørn Skaarup and Preben Dabelsteen wins gold in Men's Doubles
  - Tonny Ahm and Kirsten Thorndahl wins gold in Women's Doubles
  - Poul Holm and Tonny Ahm win gold in Mixed Doubles

== Births ==
=== April–June ===
- 23 April – Holger K. Nielsen, politician
- 15 May – Jørgen Marcussen, cuclist
- 26 May – Esben Storm, Danish-Australian screenwriter, director and actor (died 2011)
- 7 June – Ebbe Nielsen, entomologist (died 2001)

=== July–September ===
- 20 July – Charlotte Hanmann, photographer
- 20 July – Charlotte Hanmann, photographer and painter
- 25 July – Leif Davidsen, author and journalist
- 2 August – Jussi Adler-Olsen, crime fiction writer

=== October–December ===
- 10 November – Troels Wörsel, painter (died 2018)
- 14 November – Lars Muhl, singer
- 30 December – Bjarne Stroustrup, computer scientist

== Deaths ==
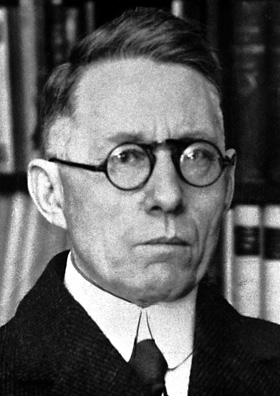
Johannes V. Jensen.

=== January–March ===
- 11 January – Karin Michaëlis, journalist and author (born 1872)
- 1 February – Peter Holm, museum director (born 1873)
- 16 February – Johannes Hjelmslev, mathematician, discoverer and eponym of the Hjelmslev transformation (born 1873)

=== April–June ===
- 11 April – Ingeborg Pehrson, asctress (died 1886)
- 16 April – Anders Peter Nielsen, sport shooter (born 1867)
- 9 May – Vilhelm Lundstrøm, painter (born 1893)
- 26 May – Louis Larsen, gymnast, silver medalist at the 1906 Intercalated Games (born 1874)
- 5 June – Rudolph Tegner, sculptor linked with the Symbolist movement (born 1873)

=== July–September ===
- 7 July– Niels Bukh, gymnast and educator (born 1880)
- 3 August – Georg Høeberg, composer and conductor (born 1872)
- 10 September – Prince Erik, Count of Rosenborg (born 1890)

=== October–December ===
- 3 October – Elna Borch, naturalism and symbolism sculptor (born 1869)
- 31 October – Ove Jørgensen, classical scholar (born 1877)
- 19 November – Aage Redal, actor (born 1891)
- 25 November – Johannes V. Jensen, author, recipient of the Nobel Prize in Literature in 1944 (born 1873)

=== Full date unknown ===
- Per Sax Møller, silversmith
