= 1873 in Denmark =

- Decades: 1850s; 1860s; 1870s; 1880s; 1890s
- See also: Other events of 1873; List of years in Denmark

Events from the year 1873 in Denmark.

== Incumbents ==
- Monarch – Christian IX
- Prime minister – Ludvig Holstein-Holsteinborg

== Events ==
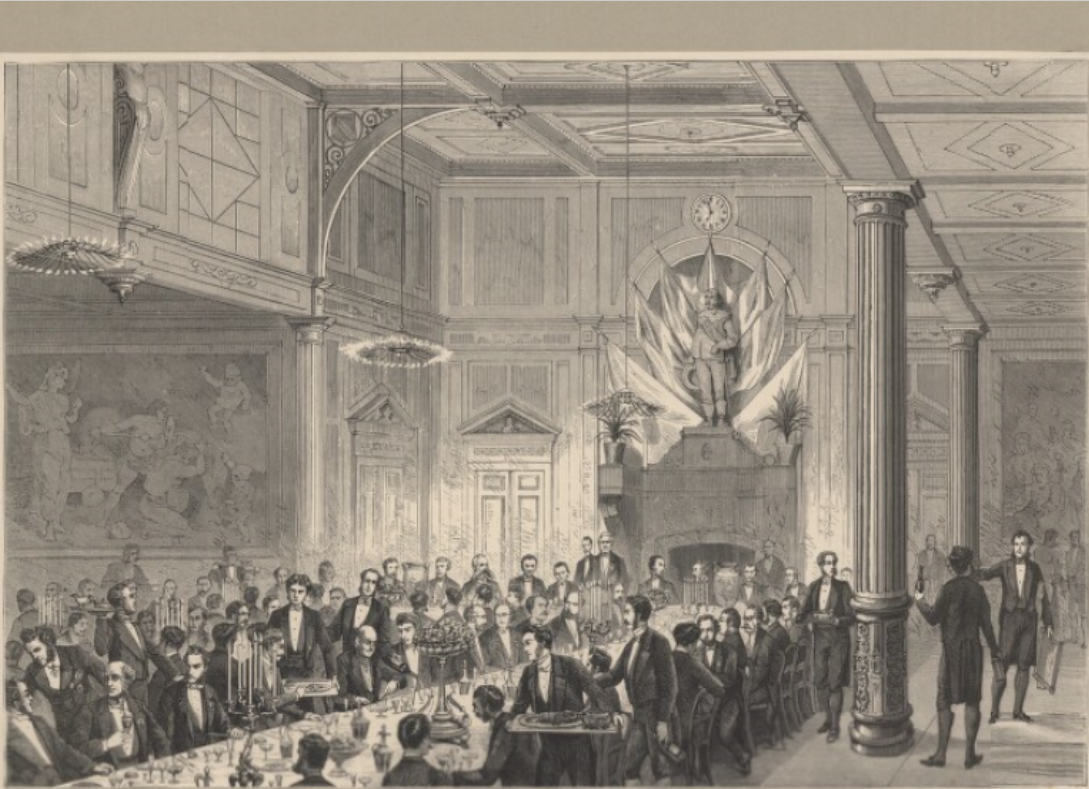
Banquet for the Japanese diplomatic mission in the Børsen Building

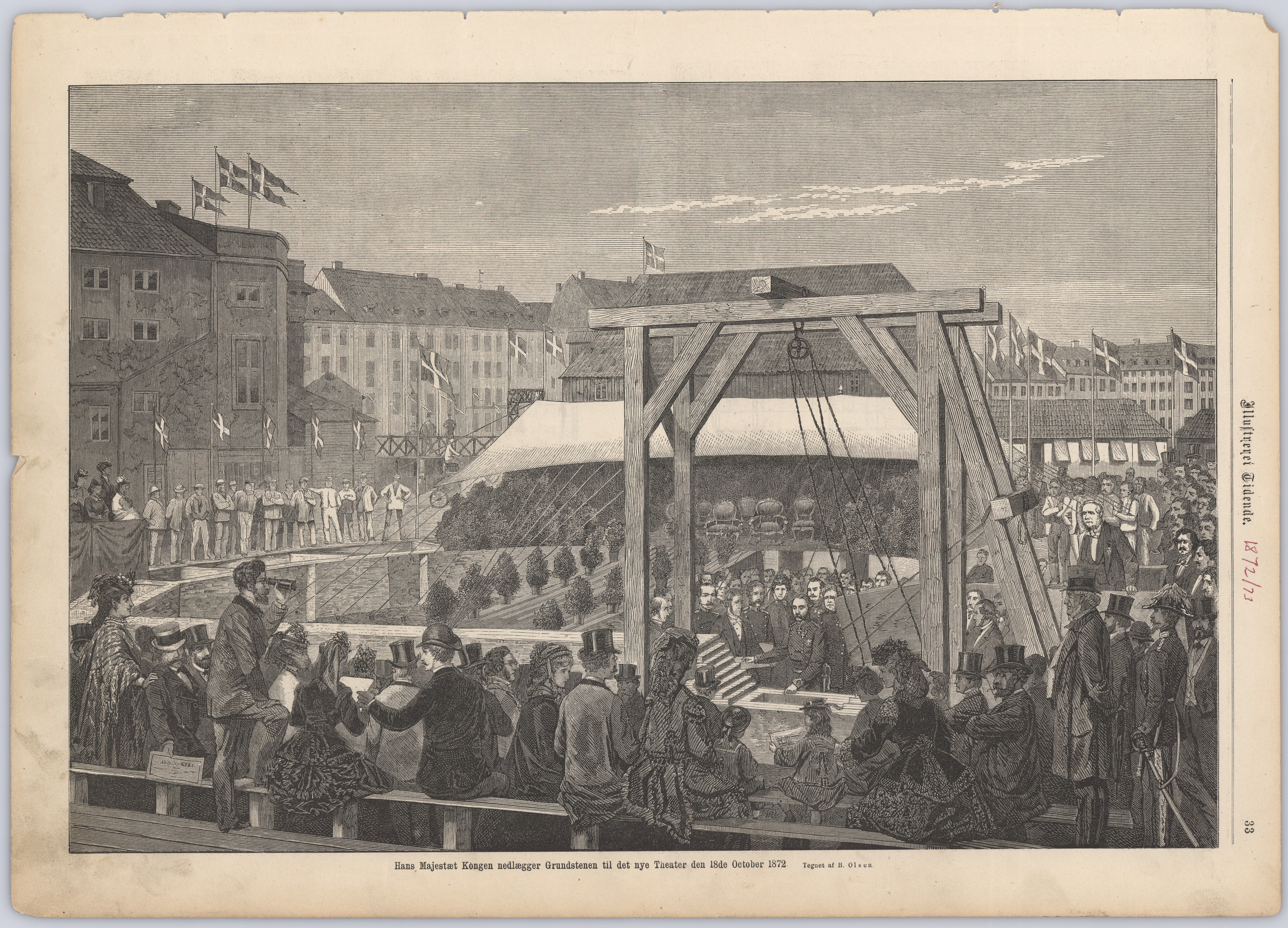
17 October: The foundation stone is set for the new Royal Danish Theatre in Copenhagen.

- 20 April – A banquet for the Japanese diplomatic mission is held in the Børsen Building in Copenhagen.
- 5 May – The Scandinavian Monetary Union, a monetary union with Sweden, is formed, pegging the countries' currencies to each other.
- 13 May – Tuborg Brewery is founded by Carl Frederik Tietgen.
- 6 October – The equestrian statue of Frederick VII in front of Christiansborg Palace in Copenhagen is unveiled.
- 17 October – The king sets the foundation stone for the new Royal Danish Theatre on Kongens Nytorv in Copenhagen.

=== Date unknown ===
- Magazine publisher Aller Media is founded.
- The Danish Mathematical Society is founded at the University of Copenhagen.
- Punch, an illustrated conservative satirical magazine modelled on the English Punch, is founded.
- A new building for the Royal Mint is completed to designs by Gerdinand Meldahl at Hammelholm in Copenhagen.

== Births ==
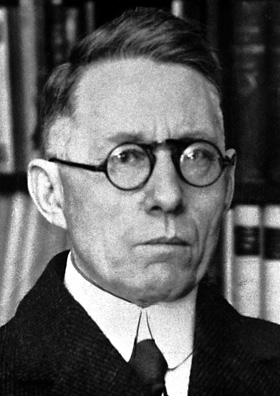
Johannes V. Jensen.

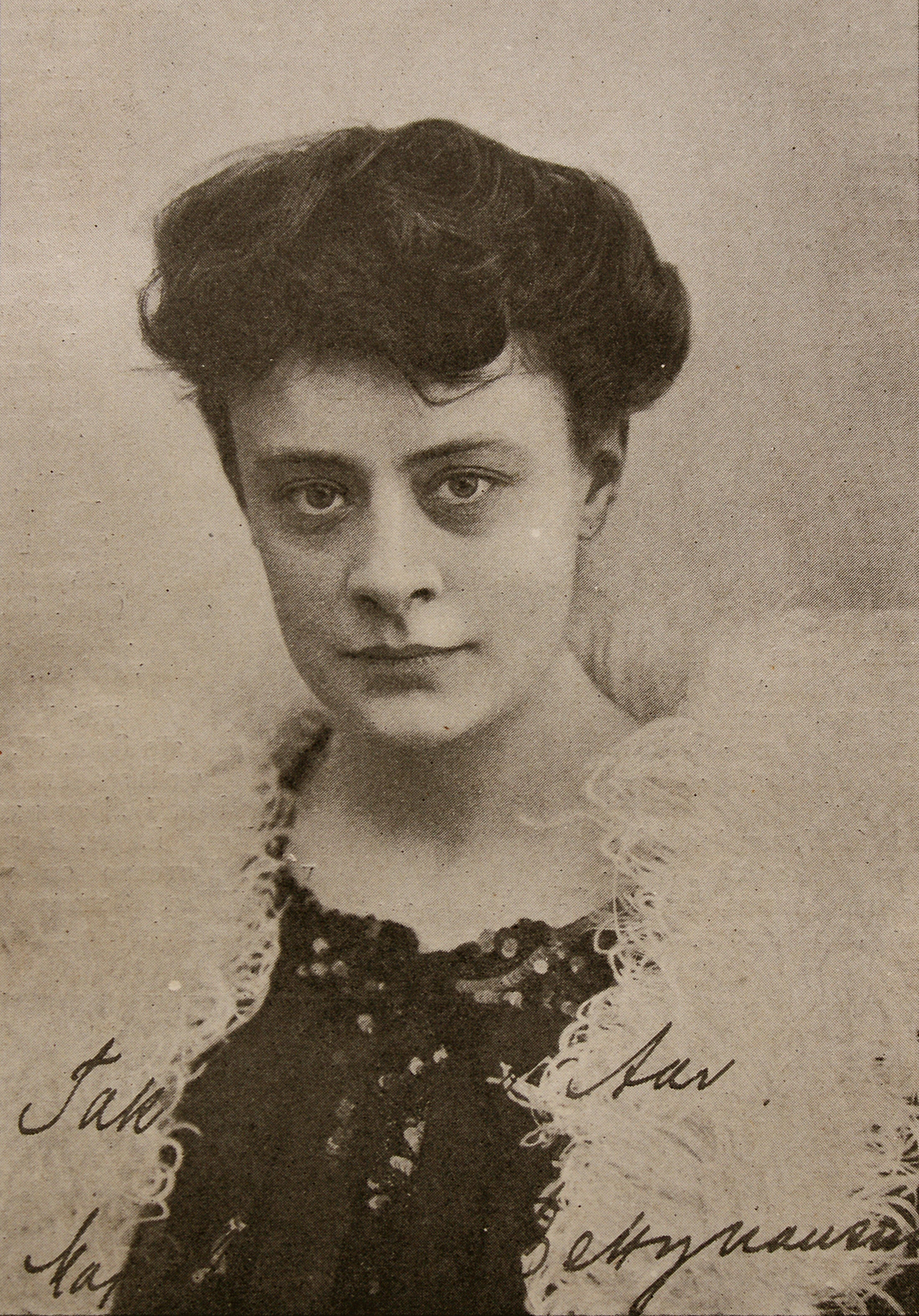
Betty Nansen.

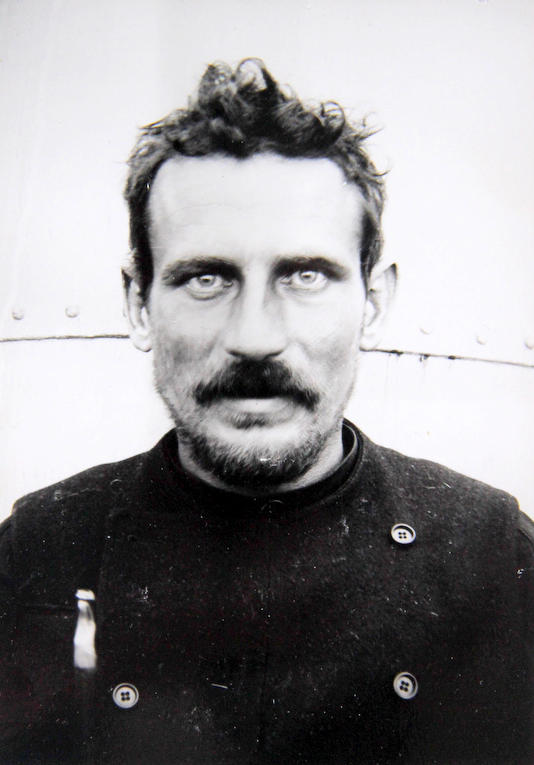
Aage Bertelsen.

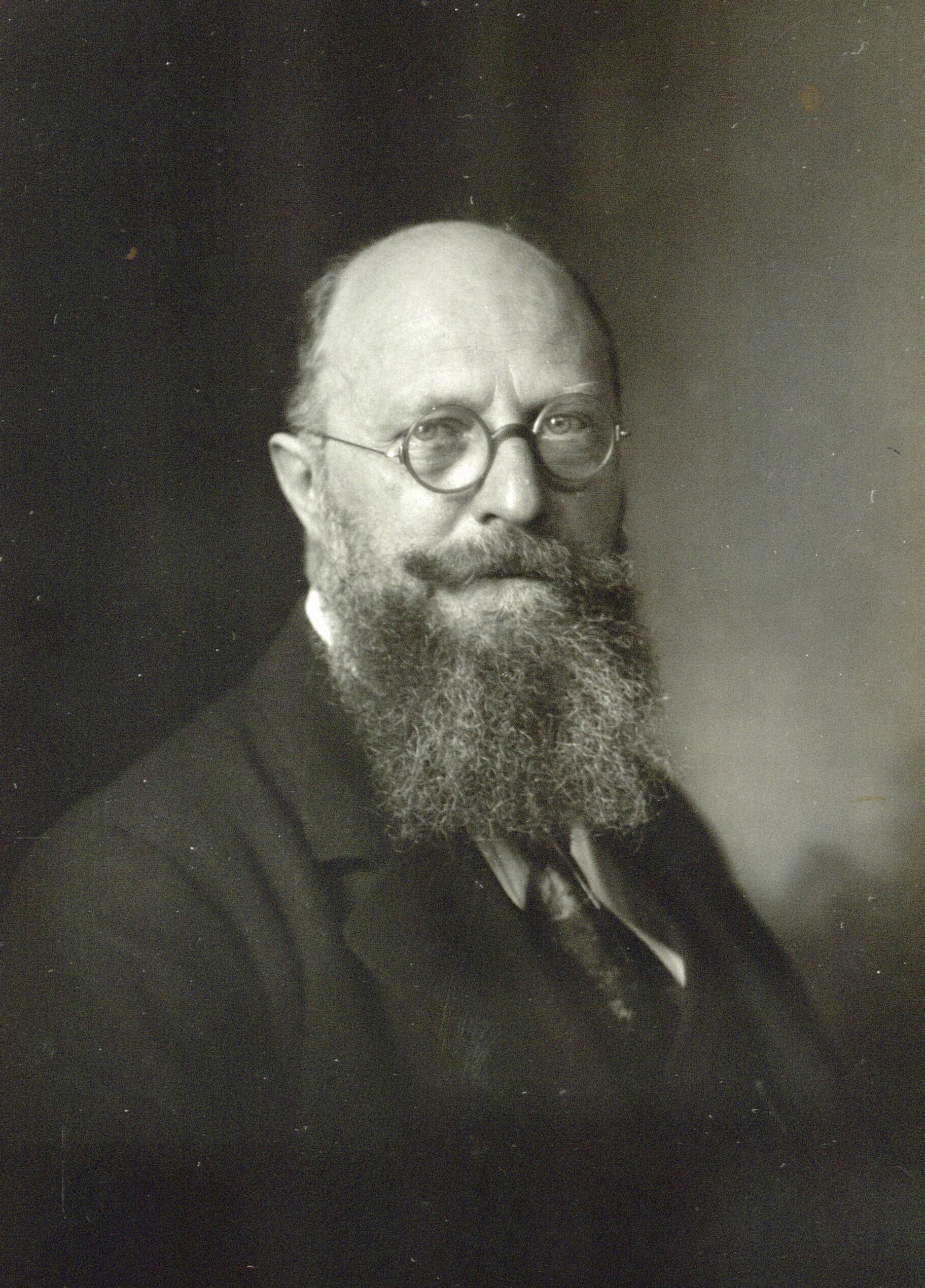
[[[Thorvald Stauning

.]]

=== January–March ===
- 9 January – Hans Frederick Blichfeldt, Danish-American mathematician (died 1945)
- 17 January – Benedict Nordentoft, educator and cleric, co-founder of a Danish community with a Lutheran church and a folk high school in Solvang, California (died 1942)
- 20 January – Johannes V. Jensen, author, recipient of the Nobel Prize in Literature in 1944 (died 1950)
- 21 January – Emilie Demant Hatt, artist, writer and ethnographer (died 1958)
- 2 February – Sophus Wangøe, cinematographer (died 1943)
- 5 February – William Thalbitzer, philologist, professor of Eskimo studies at the University of Copenhagen (died 1958)
- 12 February – Gustav Bartholin Hagen, architect (died in 1941)
- 28 February – Johan Frederik Steffensen, mathematician, statistician and actuary, professor of actuarial science at the University of Copenhagen 1923–1943 (died 1961)
- 14 March – Herluf Zahle, barrister with the Supreme Court, career diplomat, President of the League of Nations 1928–1929 (died 1941)
- 19 March – Betty Nansen, actress and theatre director (died 1943)

=== April–June ===
- 7 April
  - Johannes Hjelmslev, mathematician, discoverer and eponym of the Hjelmslev transformation (died 1950)
  - Christian Nielsen, sailor, silver medalist in the 6 Metre class at the 1924 Summer Olympics (died 1952)
- 25 April – Magdalene Lauridsen, educator (died 1957)
- 10 May – Palle Bruun, hydraulic engineer, designed the Port of Skagen (died 1910)
- 14 May – Peter Holm, museum director (died 1950)
- 21 May – Johannes Gandil, athlete (sprinter) and footballer, competitor in the 100 metre event at the 1900 Summer Olympics, silver medalist in football at the 1908 Summer Olympics (died 1956)
- 27 May – Harald Scavenius, diplomat and politician, Minister of Foreign Affairs 1920–1922 (died 1939)
- 30 May – Oluf Olsson, gymnast, silver medalist at the 1906 Intercalated Games, bronze medalist in the team free system event at the 1912 Summer Olympics (died 1947)

=== July–September ===
- 4 July – Georges Dreyer, pathologist, professor of pathology at the University of Oxford 1907–1934 (died 1934)
- 12 July – Rudolph Tegner, sculptor linked with the Symbolist movement (died 1950)
- 27 July – Estrid Hein, ophthalmologist and women's rights activist (died 1956)
- 2 August – Harald Simonsen, businessman (died 1949)
- 3 August – Carl Hansen Ostenfeld, systematic botanist, professor in botany at the Royal Veterinary and Agricultural University from 1918, professor in botany at the University of Copenhagen and director of the Copenhagen Botanical Garden from 1923 (died 1931)
- 10 August
  - Esther Carstensen, women's rights activist and journal editor (died 1955)
  - Svend Hammershøi, painter and ceramist (died 1948)
- 2 September – Johanne Hesbeck, photographer (died 1927)
- 28 September – Aage Bertelsen, artist (died 1045)

=== October–December ===
- 8 October – Ejnar Hertzsprung, chemist and astronomer (died 1967)
- 17 October – Aage Hertel, actor (died 1944)
- 26 October – Thorvald Stauning, politician, the first social democratic Prime Minister of Denmark, served as Prime Minister 1924–1926 and from 1929 (died 1942)
- 4 November – Jorgen Moeller, chess master (died 1944)
- 2 December – Christian Steenstrup, Danish-American inventor, invented the hermetically sealed refrigeration unit (died 1955)
- 4 December – Henrik Malberg, theater and cinema actor (died 1958)

=== Date unknown ===
- Johanne Agerskov, intermediary (died 1946)

== Deaths ==
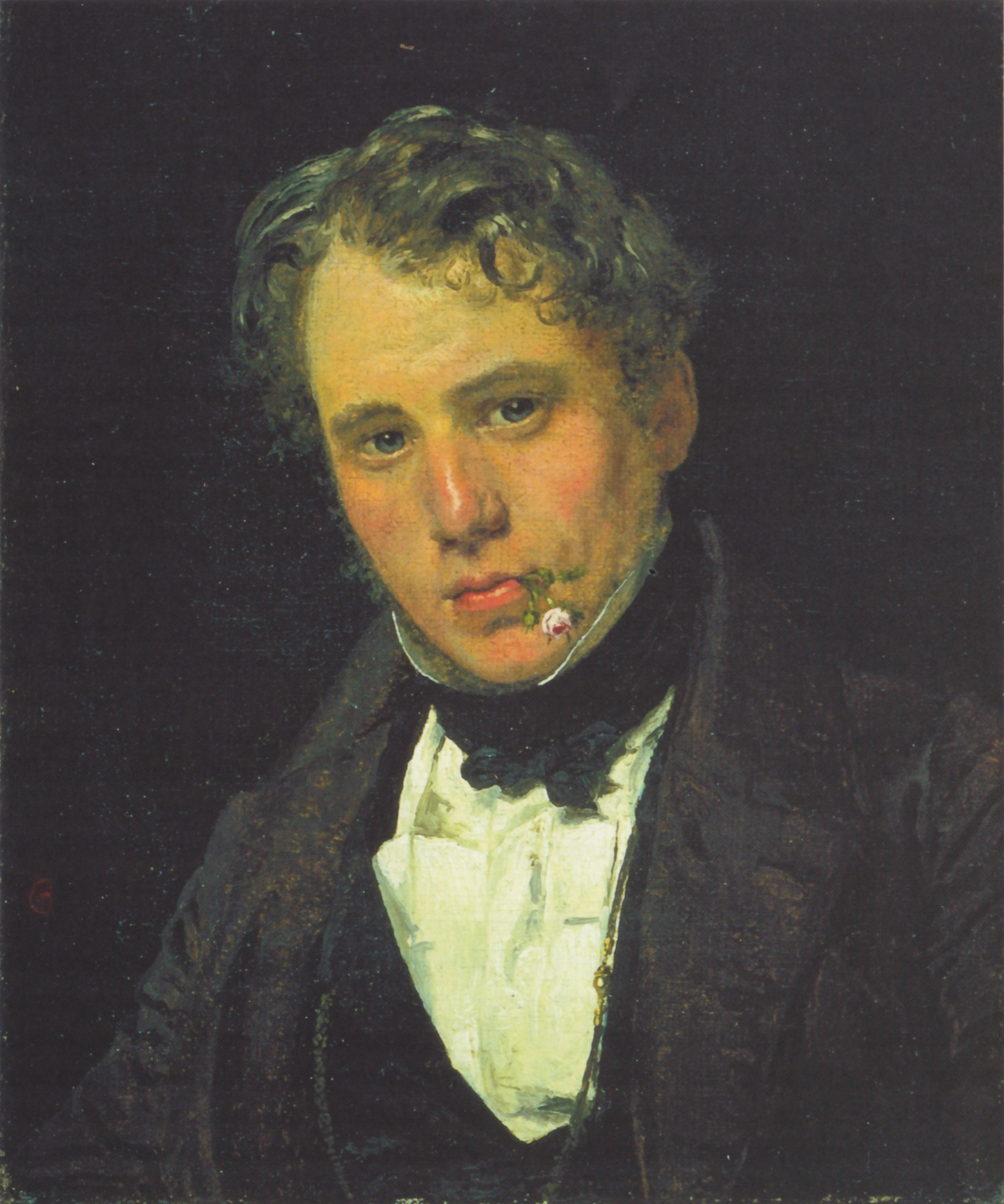
Wilhelm Marstrand.

=== January–March ===
- 25 March – Wilhelm Marstrand, painter and illustrator (born 1810)

=== April–June ===
- 10 April – Carl Otto Reventlow, philologist, developed a mnemonic system (born 1817)

=== October–December ===
- 3 November – John Christmas. naval officer, plantation owner and acting Governor-General of the Danish West Indies (born 1799)
- 7 November – Thomas Overskou, actor, playwright and historian (born 1798)
- 25 November – Hans Harder, painter and drawing master (born 1792)
