= 1954 in Denmark =

- Decades: 1930s; 1940s; 1950s; 1960s; 1970s
- See also: Other events of 1954; List of years in Denmark

Events from the year 1954 in Denmark.

== Incumbents ==
- Monarch – Frederik IX
- Prime minister – Hans Hedtoft

== Events ==
- 2 March – The 1954 Danish local elections is held.

== Sports ==
=== Date unknown ===
- Lucien Gillen (LUX) and Ferdinando Terruzzi (ITA) win the Six Days of Copenhagen six-day track cycling race.

== Births ==
=== January–March ===
- 16 January – Morten P. Meldal, chemist
- 19 February – Hans Thybo, geophysicist
- 28 February – Henning Hyllested, politician
- 29 January – Niels Eje, music composer and oboist
- 31 January – Michael Melchior, rabbi
- 25 March – Bendt Bendtsen, politician

=== April–June ===
- 15 June
  - Dan Laustsen, cinematographer
  - Uffe Elbæk, politician
- 29 June – Helle Juul, architect

=== July–September ===
- 27 July – Rose Marie Tillisch, actress
- 12 September
  - Ole Sohn, politician and writer
  - Jakob Sølvhøj, politician
- 16 September – Dan Folke, composer (born 1906)

=== October–December ===
- 10 October – Lars Rebien Sørensen, business executive
- 10 November – Hans Kjeld Rasmussen, sports shooter (d. 2025)
- 14 December – Ib Andersen, ballet dancer, choreographer, and painter.
- 26 December – Astrid Noack, sculptor (born 1889)

== Deaths ==
=== January–March ===
- 31 January – Astrid Rosing Sawyer, businesswoman and translator (born 1874)
- 11 March – Cai Gundelach, equestrian (born 1891)

=== April–June ===
- 5 April – Øjvind Winge, biologist (born 1886)
- 1 June – Martin Andersen Nexø, socialist, later communist, writer (born 1869)

=== July–September ===
- 8 July – Sigurd Langberg, actor (born 1897)
- 27 July – Thorvald Ellegaard, cyclist (born 1877)
- 29 August – Thyra Manicus-Hansen, ceramist (born 1872)

=== October–December ===
- 6 October – Hakon Børresen, composer (born 1876)
- 8 October – Morten Korch, writer of populist stories and romances (born 1876)
- 10 October – Lars Rebien Sørensen, business executive
- 11 November – Johannes Giersing, chess master (born 1872)
- 18 December – Vilhelm Buhl, politician (born 1881)
- 26 December – Astrid Noack, sculptor (born 1888)
