= 1955 in Danish television =

This is a list of Danish television related events from 1955.

== Births ==
- 16 October – Søren Pilmark, actor

== See also ==
- 1955 in Denmark
