= 1949 in Denmark =

- Decades: 1920s; 1930s; 1940s; 1950s; 1960s
- See also: Other events of 1949; List of years in Denmark

Events from the year 1949 in Denmark.

== Incumbents ==
- Monarch – Frederik IX
- Prime minister – Hans Hedtoft

== Events ==
- 30 March – Prince Harald, uncle of King Frederik IX, dies in Copenhagen at age 72, following two years of illness.

== Sport ==
=== Badminton ===
- 5 March – Tonny Ahm wins gold in Women's Singles at the All England Badminton Championships.

=== Cycling ===
- 22–28 August – The 1949 UCI Track Cycling World Championships are held in Copenhagen.
  - Knud Andersen wins gold in Men's individual pursuit.

=== Football ===
- KB wins the 1948–49 Danish 1st Division. It is their 10th Danish football championship.

== Births ==
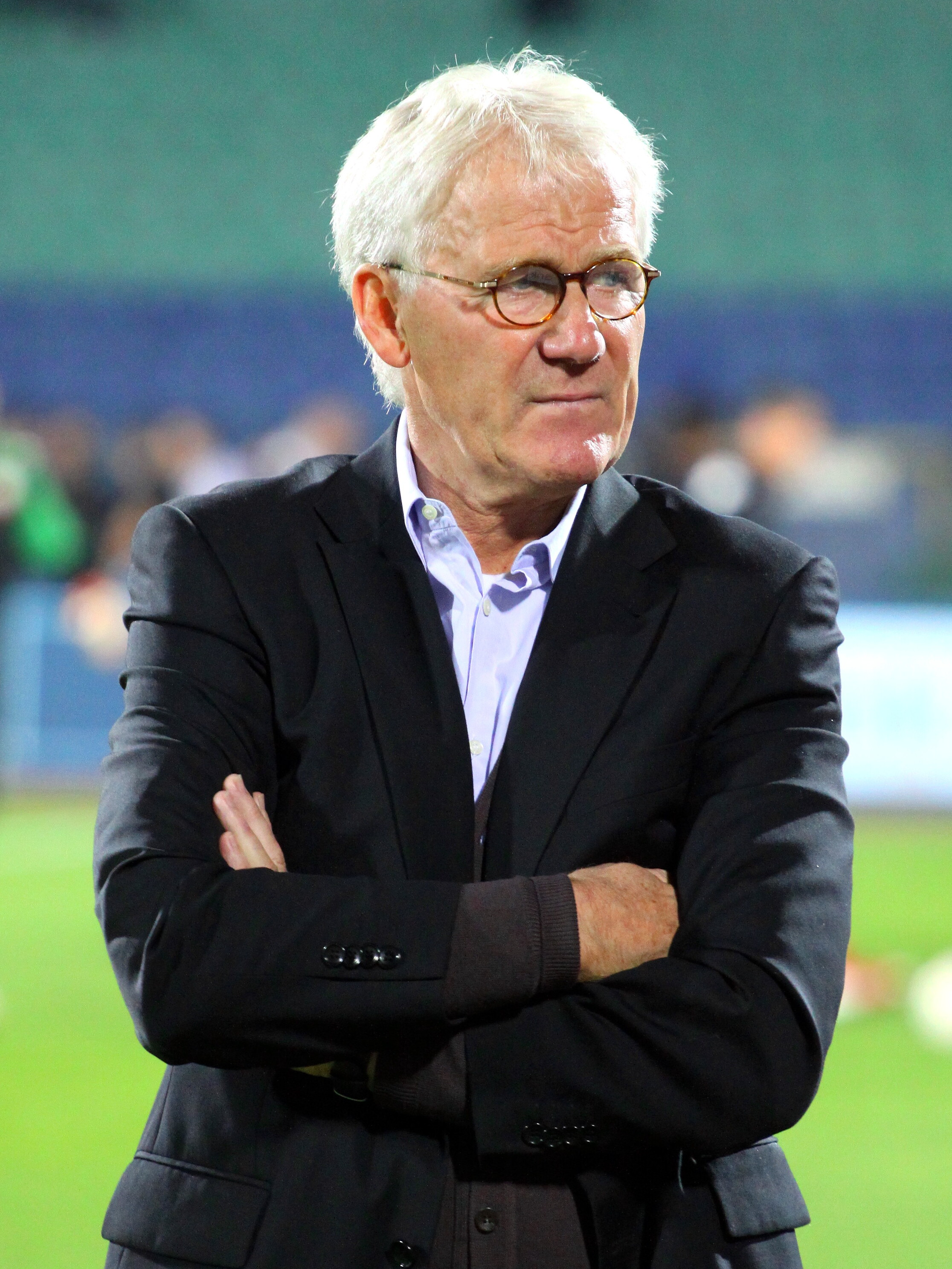
Morten Olsen.

=== January–March ===
- 4 January – Torben Hardenberg, goldsmith
- 27 January – Per Røntved, footballer (died 2023)
- 27 March – Poul Ruders, composer

=== April–June ===
- 22 April – Per Bak Jensen, photographer

=== July–September ===
- 14 August – Morten Olsen, football player
- 14 September – Tommy Seebach, singer, composer, and keyboardist (died 2003)

=== October–December ===
- 5 October – Thomas Clausen, jazz pianist
- 11 December – Peter Brixtofte, politician (died 2016)
- 19 December – Sebastian, singer, guitarist and composer

== Deaths ==
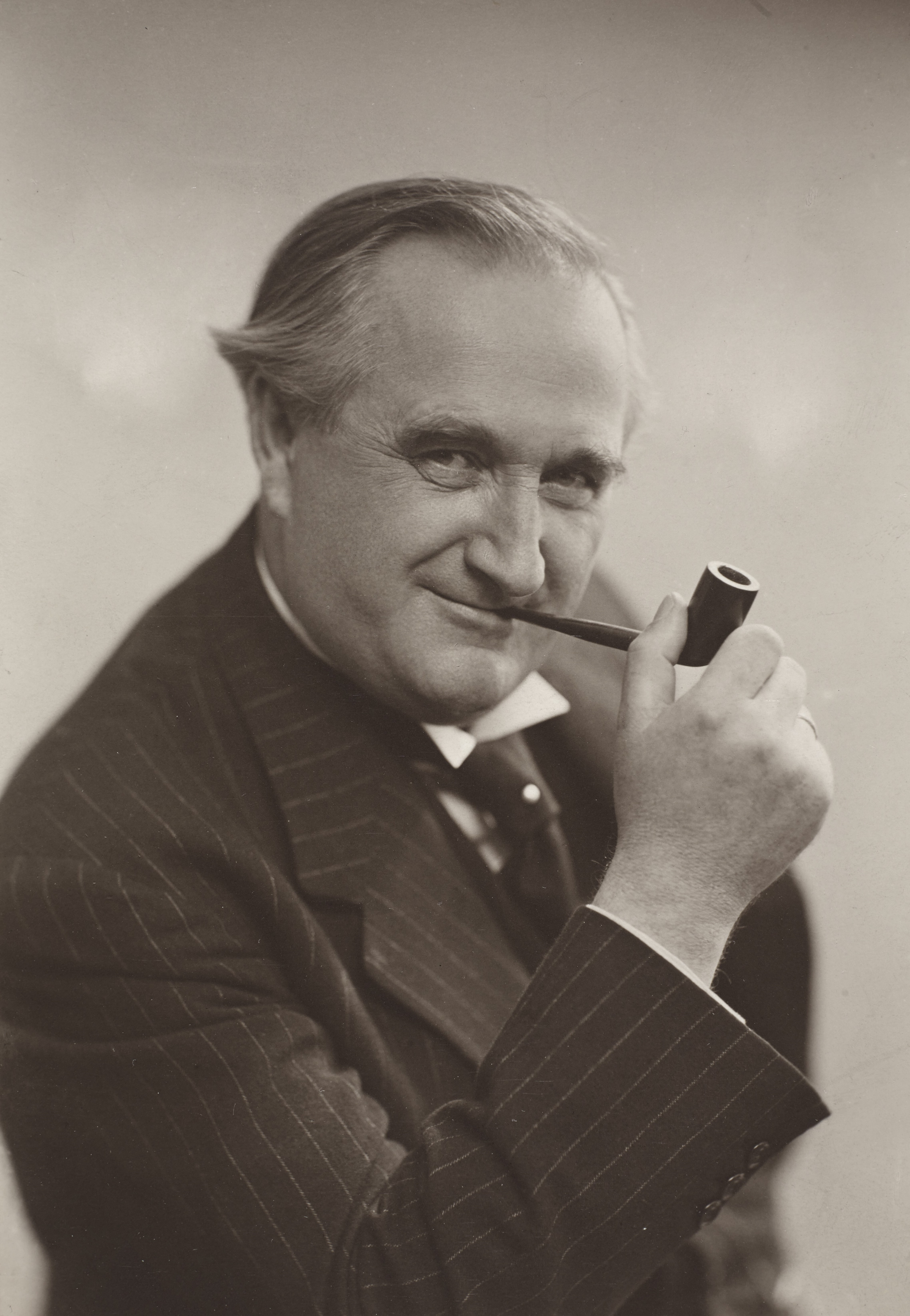
Robert Storm Petersen.

=== January–March ===
- 3 February – Harald Simonsen, businessman (born 1873)
- 25 February – Edvard Nielsen-Stevns, writer (born 1880)
- 6 March – Robert Storm Petersen, cartoonist, painter, inventor, writer (born 1882)
- 30 March – Prince Harald, royal, army officer (born 1876)

=== April–June ===
- 27 May – Martin Knudsen, physicist and researcher after whom the Knudsen gas state, the Knudsen number, and the Knudsen layer are named (born 1871)
- 28 June – Laurits Larsen, Olympic sport shooter and bronze medalist (born 1872)

=== July–September ===
- 10 August – Birger Wøllner Gaarn, composer and organist (born 1881)
- 21 August – Ole Falkentorp, architect (born 1886)
- 13 September – August Krogh, professor at the department of zoophysiology at the University of Copenhagen 1916–1945, recipient of the Nobel Prize in Physiology or Medicine in 1920 (born 1874)
- 28 September – Nancy Dalberg, composer (born 1881)

=== October–December ===
- 7 November – Ville Jais Nielsen, painter and sculptor (born 1886)
- 12 November – Christian Schmiegelow, businessman (born 1859)
- 22 December – Svend Olufsen, engineer and company founder (born 1897)
