= 1951 in Denmark =

- Decades: 1930s; 1940s; 1950s; 1960s; 1970s
- See also: Other events of 1951; List of years in Denmark

Events from the year 1951 in Denmark.

== Incumbents ==
- Monarch – Frederik IX
- Prime minister – Erik Eriksen

== Events ==
- 23 January – The hospital ship MS Jutlandia departs from Copenhagen, bound for Jorea.

== Sports ==
=== Badminton ===
- 7–11 March – All England Badminton Championships
  - Aase Schiøtt Jacobsen wins gold in Women's Singles at the All England Badminton Championships.
  - Tonny Ahm and Kirsten Thorndahl wins gold in Women's Doubles
  - Poul Holm and Tonny Ahm win gold in Mixed Doubles

=== Date unknown ===
- Kay Werner Nielsen (DEN) and Oscar Plattner (SUI) win the Six Days of Copenhagen six-day track cycling race.

== Births ==
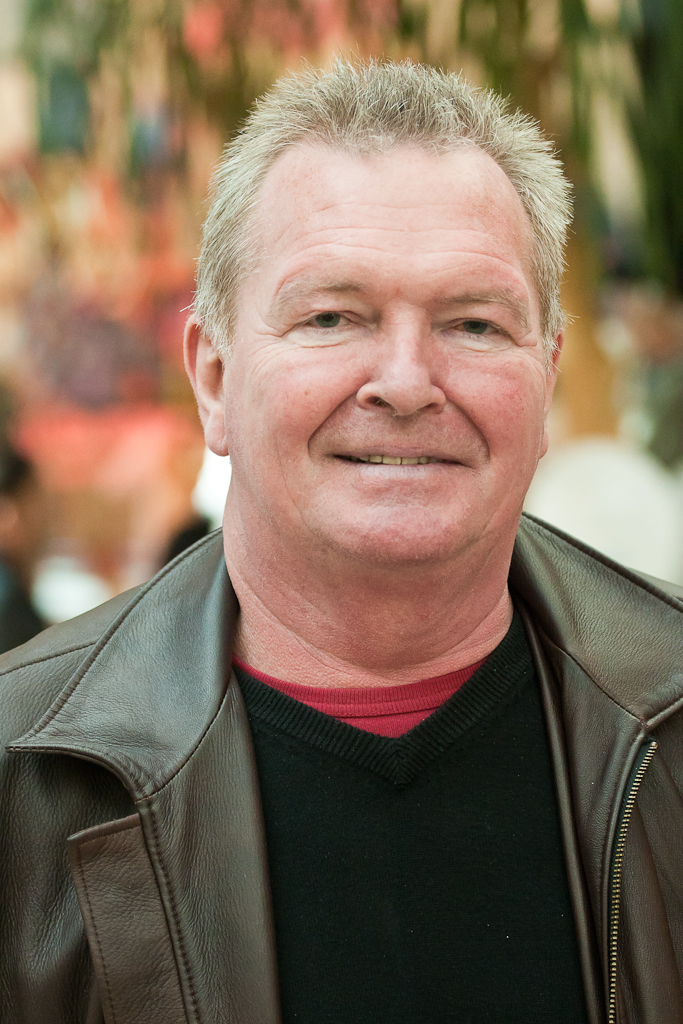
Frank Arnesen.

=== January–March ===
- 1 March – Birger Jensen, footballer
- 7 March – Ulla Henningsen, actress

=== April–June ===
- 13 April – Finn Tarp, economist
- 4 May – Ole Henriksen, cosmetician and manufactur of skin care products
- 12 May – Jacob Groth, film score composer

=== July–September ===
- 25 July – Frank Aaen, politician

=== October–December ===
- 7 November – Anne Grethe Jensen, equestrian
- 14 November – Ingeborg Maria Sick, writher and philanthropist (died 1858)
- 17 November – Czeslaw Kozon, prelate of the Catholic Church

== Deaths ==
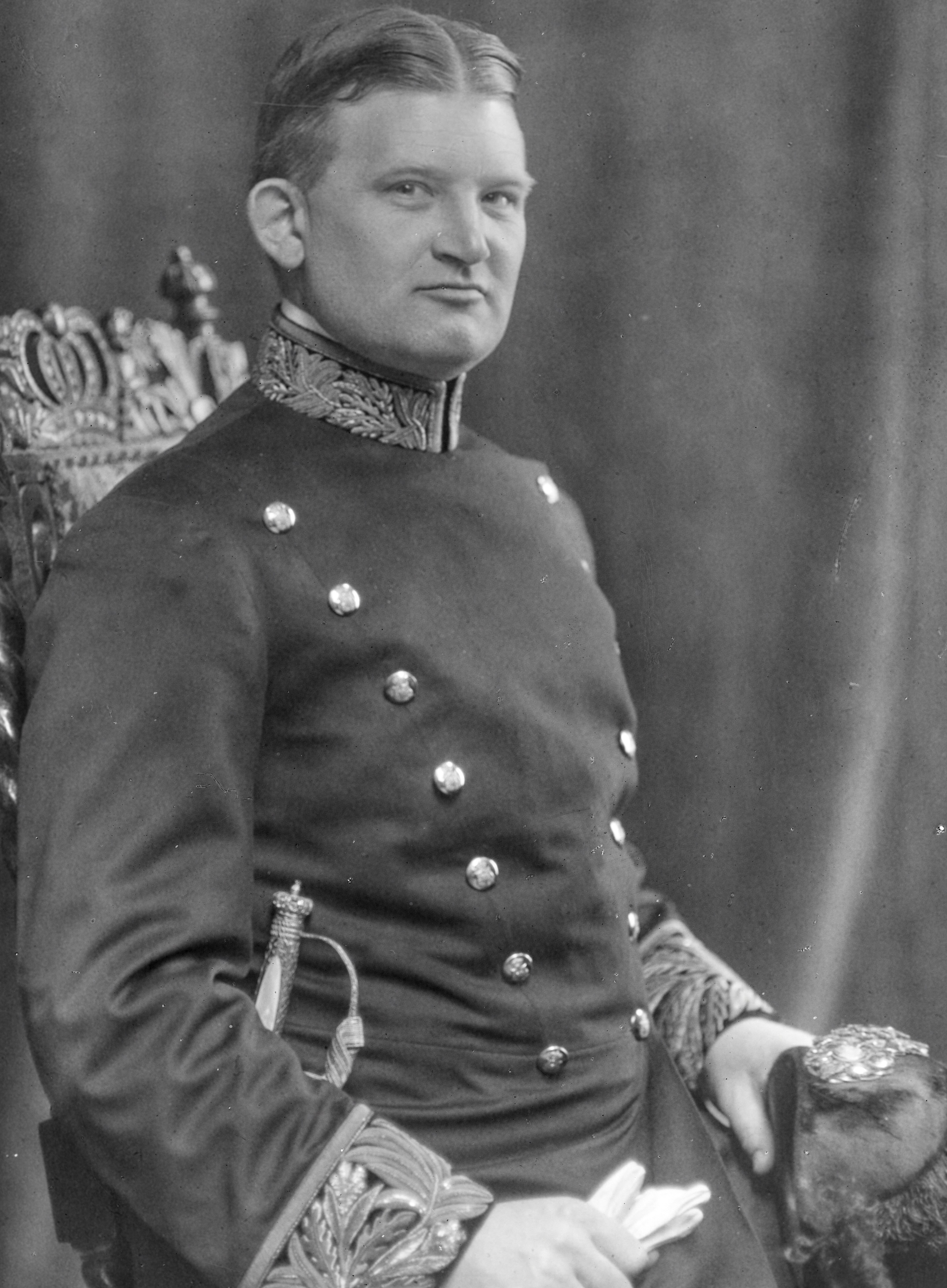
Erik Arup.

=== January–March ===
- 22 January – Harald Bohr, mathematician (born 1887)

=== April–June ===
- 6 April – Marie-Sophie Nielsen, communist leader and founding member of the Danish Socialist Workers Party and the Communist Party of Denmark (born 1875)
- 14 May – Kristian Hansen Kofoed, politician (born 1879)
- 26 June – Gerda Henning, designer (died 1891)
- 28 June – Thora Daugaard, women's rights activist, pacifist, editor and translator (born 1874)

=== July–September ===
- 19 August – Christian Geisler, organist and composer (born 1869)
- 23 September – Erik Arup, historian (born 1876)

=== October–December ===
- 13 December – Birgitte Berg Nielsen, educator and activist (born 1861)
- 24 December – Bodil Hauschildt, photographer (born 1861)
