= 1872 in Denmark =

- Decades: 1850s; 1860s; 1870s; 1880s; 1890s
- See also: Other events of 1872; List of years in Denmark

Events from the year 1872 in Denmark.

== Incumbents ==
- Monarch – Christian IX
- Prime minister – Ludvig Holstein-Holsteinborg

== Events ==
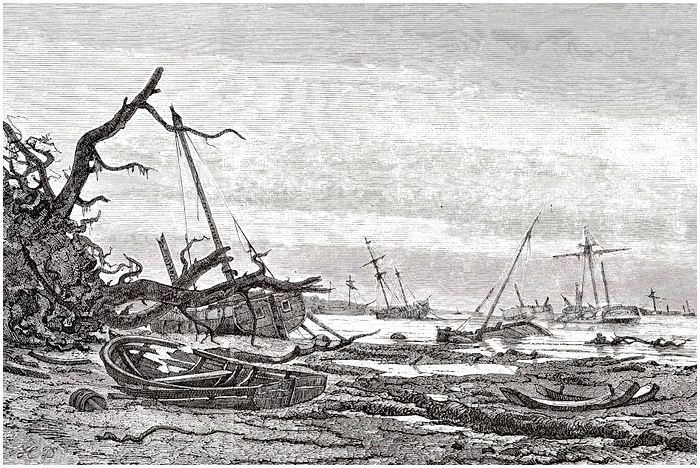
The destructions caused by the 1872 Baltic Sea flood in the area between Præstø and Faxe as depicted by Holger Drachmann as reporter for Illustreret Tidende.

April

- 1 April – The Danish Meteorological Institute is founded.

August

- 3 August – Prince Carl, the future King Haakon VII of Norway, is born to Crown Prince Frederik and Crown Princess Louise.
- 15 August – Krebs School is founded in Copenhagen.

September

- 20 September – The 1872 Folketing election is held, resulting in a victory for the United Left.

November

- 12–14 November – The 1872 Baltic Sea storm surge floods large parts of Lolland and Falster. 80 people are killed, 50 ships are wrecked on the east coast of Zealand and other islands, low-lying areas along the Øresund, in Eastern Jutland and on Bornholm are also hard hit.

December

- 12 December – The central battery ironclad Odin is launched from the Naval Dockyard in Copenhagen.

=== Date unknown ===
- The Book on Adler, a book on pastor Adolph Peter Adler by philosopher Søren Kierkegaard, is published posthumously.
- Brumleby, an enclave of terraced houses and one of the earliest examples of social housing, is completed in Copenhagen.
- Fritz Hansen, a furniture design company, is founded.
- Svendborg Gymnasium, one of the largest upper secondary schools in Denmark, is founded as Svendborg Realskole.

== Culture ==
=== Art ===
- Otto Vache is awarded the Thorvaldsen Exhibition Medal for the painting Portrait group of the Ræder family (Portrætgruppe af Familien Ræder).

== Births ==
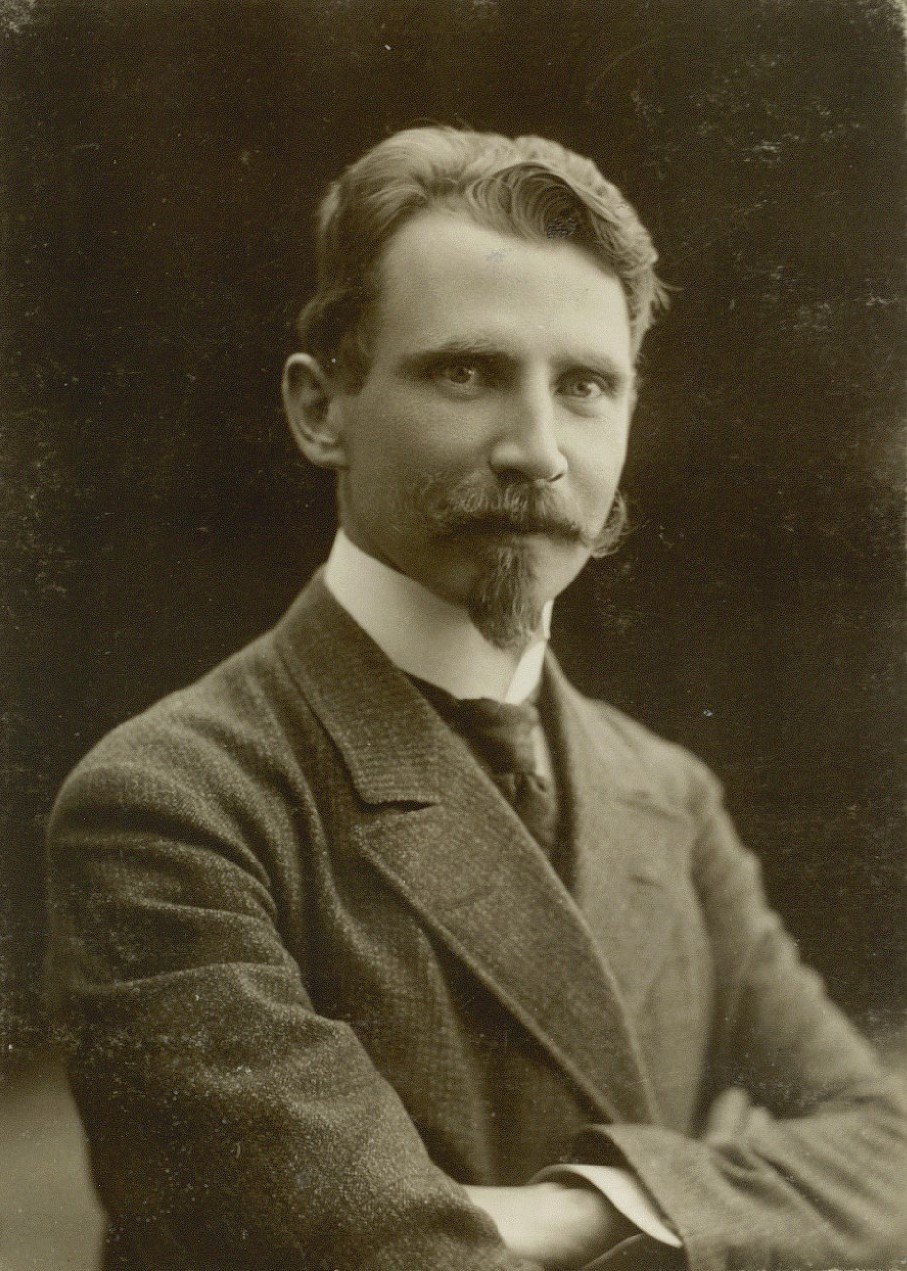
Ludvig Mylius-Erichsen,

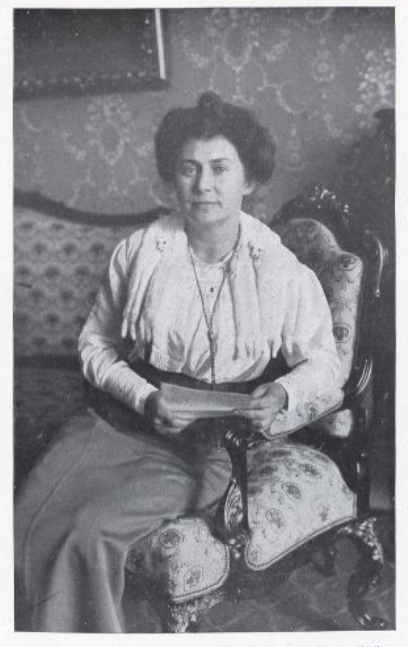
Karin Michaëlis,

=== January–March ===
- 15 January – Ludvig Mylius-Erichsen, arctic explorer, author and ethnologist (died 1907)
- 16 January – Carl Christensen, systematic botanist, later superintendent at the Copenhagen Botanical Museum (died 1942)
- 17 January – Gudmund Schütte, philologist and historian (died 1958)
- 12 February – Oscar Stribolt, stage and film actor during the silent film era (died 1927)
- 20 March – Karin Michaëlis, journalist and author (died 1950)

=== April–June ===
- 7 April – Alhed Larsen, painter (died 1927)
- 8 April – Laurits Larsen, Olympic sport shooter, bronze medalist in team free rifle at the 1912 Summer Olympics (died 1949)
- 16 April –Frits Bülow, politician (died 1955)
- 10 June – Cathrine Horsbøl, furniture designer and carpenter (died 1947)
- 13 June – Sigvart Werner, amateur photographer famous for his artistic landscape photographs (died 1959)

=== July–September ===
- 9 July – Ejnar Nielsen, painter and illustrator, central proponent of Symbolist painting (died 1956)
- 27 July – Jens Olsen, clockmaker, locksmith and astro-mechanic, constructor of the World Clock in Copenhagen City Hall (died 1945)
- 3 August – Prince Carl, the future King Haakon VII of Norway (died 1957)
- 1 September – Morten Pedersen Porsild, botanist active in Greenland (died 1956)
- 7 September – Thyra Manicus-Hansen, ceramist (died 1054)
- 23 September – Valdemar Rørdam, national conservative poet, author of "Denmark in a Thousand Years" (died 1946)

=== October–December ===
- 6 October – Hans Peter Hansen, journalist and politician (died 1953)
- 11 October – Carl William Hansen, author, Luciferian, wandering bishop and occultist (died 1936)
- 12 October – Carl Emil Krarup, telegraph engineer, mainly known for the invention of the Krarup cable, a kind of loaded cable (died 1909)
- 27 October – Karen Hannoverm ceramist (died 1943)
- 18 November – Johannes Giersing, chess master (died 1954)
- 10 December – Helvig Kinch, painter and illustrator (died 1956)
- 27 December – Georg Høeberg, composer and conductor (died 1950)

== Deaths ==
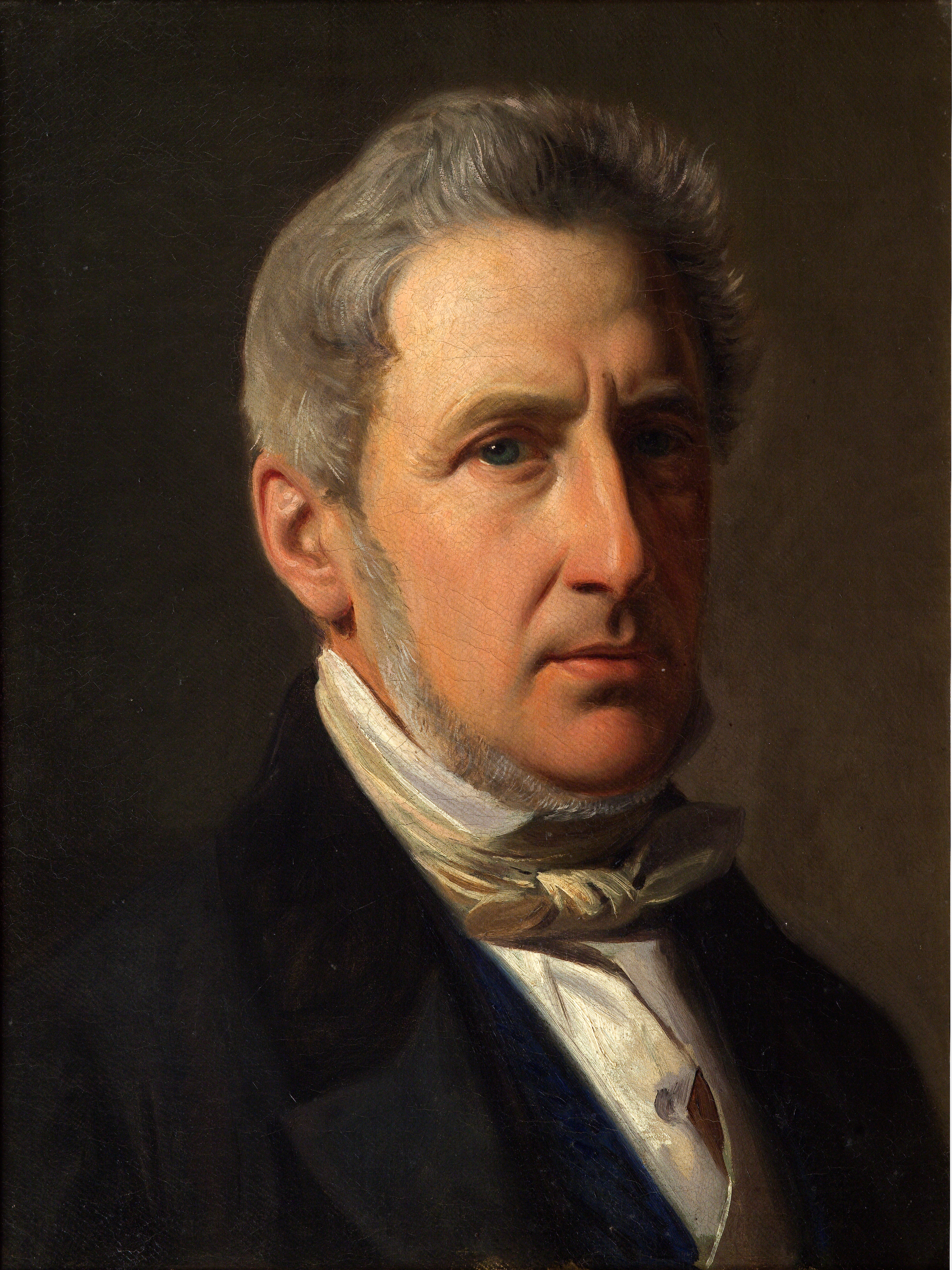
Alfred Hage.

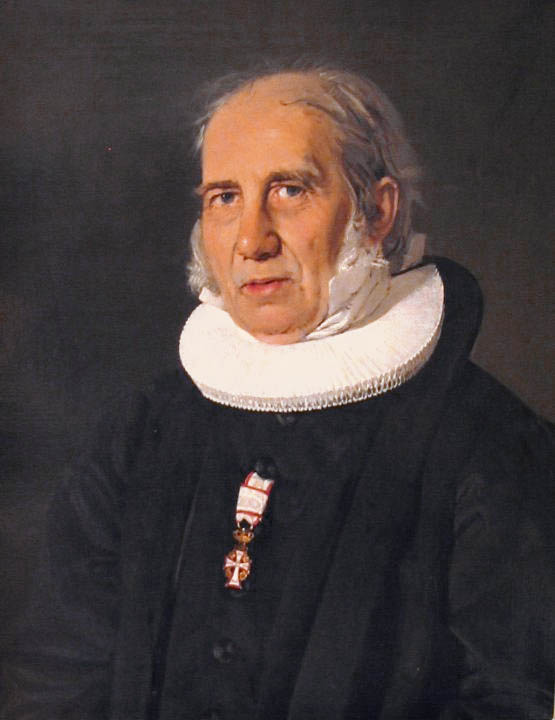
N.F.S. Grundtvig.

=== January–March ===
- 4 March – Carsten Hauch, poet (b. 1790)
- 6 March - Alfred Hage, merchant and landowner (b. 1803)

=== April–June ===
- 10 April – Christine Løvmand, artist specializing in painting flowers and still lifes (b. 1803)
- 17 June – Mathilde Fibiger, feminist, novelist and telegraphist (b. 1830)

=== July–September ===
- 16 August – Andreas Flinch, goldsmith, wood-engraver and lithographer (b. 1813)
- 2 September – N. F. S. Grundtvig, pastor, author, poet, philosopher, historian, teacher and politician (b. 1783)
- 3 September – Anders Sandøe Ørsted, botanist, mycologist, zoologist and marine biologist (b. 1816)
- 26 September – Hans Birch Dahlerup, naval officer (born 1790)
