= Albert Kongsbak =

Danish artist

Albert Georg Kongsbak was a Danish artist. He was born on 20 February 1877 and died on 21 October 1958 He is most famous for his landscapes in the realist or naturalist style. He moved to Copenhagen when he was ten years old. He created drawings throughout his childhood. He trained as a painter and visual artist at the Royal Art Academy in Copenhagen from 1895 to 1901. At the Academy Kongsbak developed into a naturalist painter.

Kongsbak painted landscapes, portraits, and interiors. He gained inspiration for his work during his travels abroad. From 1898–1899 Kongsbak traveled in Germany and Switzerland, then in Italy in 1923–1924 and 1939. He also worked in Paris in 1925. His work was included in many of the Royal Charlottenborg exhibitions in Copenhagen from 1902 to 1959. Kongsbak's most prominent works can be found such in museums as: Rudersdal Museer, Københavns Museum, Kunsten Museum of modern art Aalborg.

== Further reading in Danish ==
- Der dänische Maler Albert Kongsbak: 1877-1958
- Albert Kongsbak
