= Torben Hardenberg =

Danish goldsmith

Torben Hardenberg (4 January 1949) is a Danish goldsmith.

== Biography ==
Gardenberg was born on 4 January 1949. He completed his training as a goldsmith in 1972. He established his own firm in 1976. He had his debut at an exhibition at the Danish Museum of Arts & Crafts in 1987. His first work was sold to Margrethe II.

== Works ==
In 1995–06, Hardenberg created a chandelier for the vestibule in Moltke's Mansion in Copenhagen.

== Awards ==
Hardenberg is a Knight of the Order of the Dannebrog.In 2022, he received Direktør Einar Hansen og hustru fru Vera Hansens Fond for årets Kunst-, Design- og Arkitekturpris.
