= Christian Steenstrup =

Danish inventor

Christian Steenstrup (December 2, 1873 – November 28, 1955) was a Danish inventor who invented the hermetically sealed refrigeration unit while Chief Engineer at General Electric, and held over 100 patents. His improvement to the refrigerator sent the sales of the G.E. Monitor Top refrigerator soaring. Streenstrup immigrated to the US in 1894.
