= Per Sax Møller =

Danish silversmith and sculptor

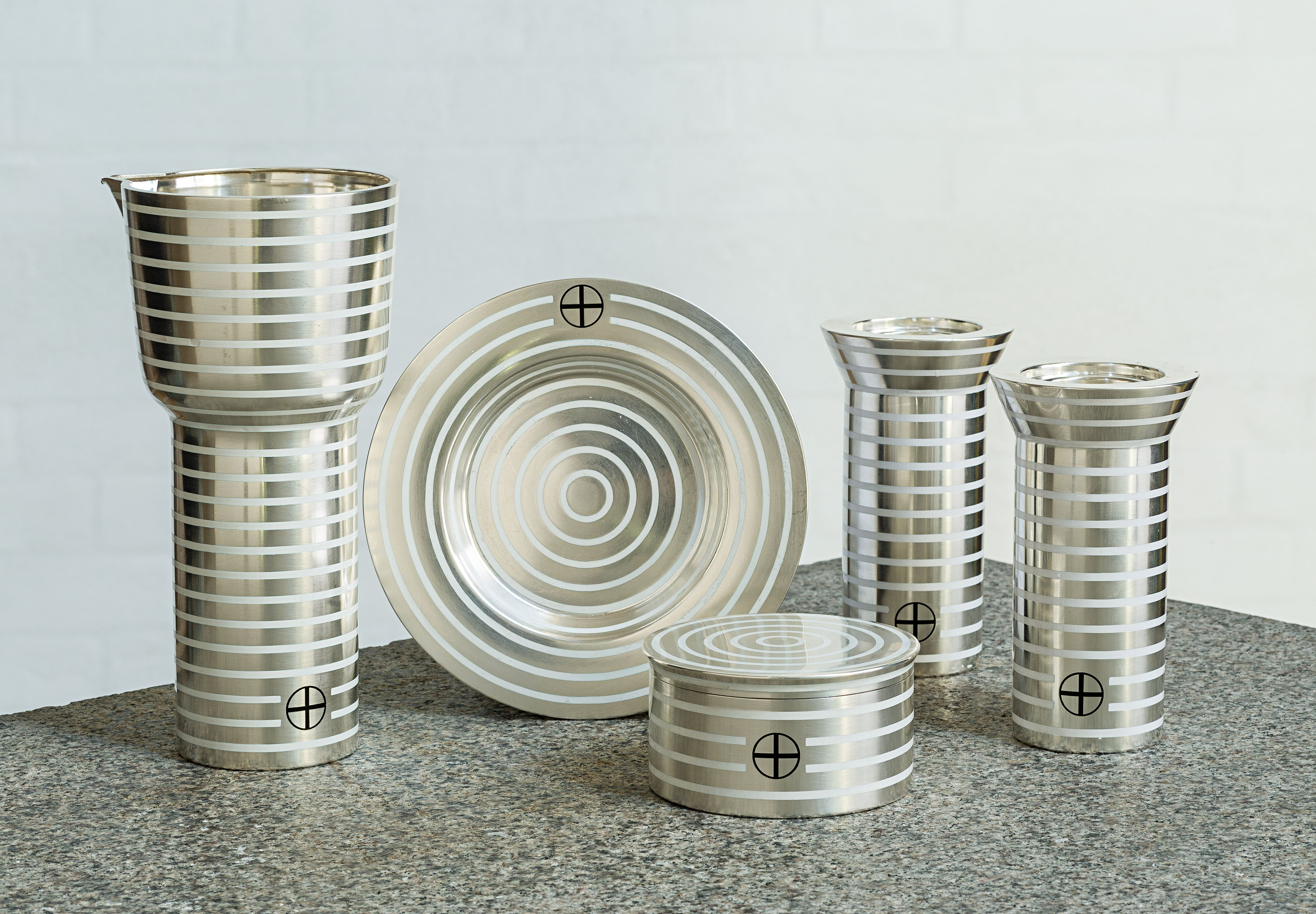
Early works by Per Sax Hansen.

Per Sax Møller is a Danish silversmith and sculptor. He was the 2008 recipient of the Karl Gustav Hansen Award.

== Biography ==
Møller was apprenticed as a silversmith with A. Michélsen in 1968–72. He then worked in Preben Salomonsen's silver smithy with creating copies for among others Tiffany, Bloomingdale's and Aspery. In 1976, he established his own workshop in Copenhagen. Ot was initially located on Store Kongensgade, then on Pilestræde and from 1992 in Kay Bojesen's former premises at Vredgade 47. From 1999 to 2002, he chaired the association Danish Silversmiths.

== Works ==
Møller's works are represented in the permanent collections of a number of museums, includingthe Danish Design Museum, Oslo Art Museum and Koldinghus Museum.

== Awards ==
In 2008, Møller received the Karl Gustav Hansen Award.
