= Henny Glarbo =

Danish archivist (1884–1955)

Severine Caroline Henriette (Henny) Lytzen Nielsen Glarbo (1884–1955) was a Danish archivist who is remembered for her contributions to registration, in particular for the 1748–1924 archive of the Royal Danish Academy of Fine Arts and the 1746–1930 archive of the Royal Danish Theatre. In 1952, she published Privatarkiver fra tidsrummet 1660-1800 i Rigsarkivet, a registry of private archives from 1660 to 1800 in the Danish National Archives.

== Biography ==
Born on 12 October 1884 in Viborg, Severine Caroline Henriette Lytzen Nielsen Glarbo was the daughter of Ole Nielsen Glarbo (1848–1916), a parish priest, and Lovise Bruun (1842–1923). After earning a teaching diploma in 1907, she spent three years at the private realskole in Slagelse. She then attended the University of Copenhagen where she graduated in history, Latin and English in 1917.

After working as an assistant on a temporary basis at the Danish National Archives, in 1919, she was employed there as a full-time archivist. She quickly became one of the leading lights at the archive, running the reading room service for several years. After researching Denmark's cultural connections with other countries, she applied her knowledge to developing appropriate archives.

Henny Glarbo died in Copenhagen on 9 September 1955.
