= 1938–39 Danish Championship League =

Football league season

Danish Championship League
- Season: 1938–39
- Champions: Boldklubben af 1893

Following are the statistics of the Danish Championship League in the 1938–39 season.

== Overview ==
It was contested by 10 teams, and Boldklubben af 1893 won the championship.

== League standings ==
Pos	Team	Pld	W	D	L	GF	GA	GD	Pts
1	Boldklubben af 1893	18	15	1	2	75	21	+54	31
2	Kjøbenhavns Boldklub	18	10	4	4	45	30	+15	24
3	Akademisk Boldklub	18	9	2	7	48	39	+9	20
4	Aalborg Boldspilklub	18	7	4	7	31	28	+3	18
5	Boldklubben Frem	18	8	2	8	44	41	+3	18
6	Boldklubben 1903	18	8	2	8	43	41	+2	18
7	Aarhus Gymnastikforening	18	6	6	6	33	32	+1	18
8	Hellerup IK	18	5	5	8	29	37	−8	15
9	Fremad Amager	18	5	3	10	32	57	−25	13
10	Vejen SF	18	2	1	15	19	73	−54	5
