= Dalum Papirfabrik =

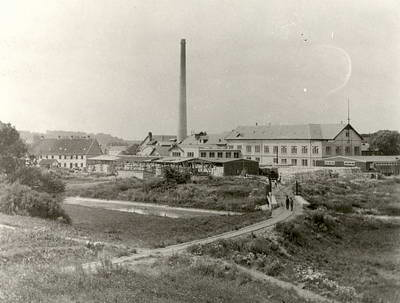
Dalum Papirfabrik.

Dalum Papirfabrik was a Danish paper factory located on the outskirts of Odense, Denmark.

== History ==
Dakun Paper Mill was established on Odense River in 1874. The first paper was manufactured on 12 November 1874 but a stable production of paper was not established until 1875. In 1889-1989, it was part of De Forenede Papirfabrikker (United Paper Mills). In 1990-1999, Dalum Paper Factory was owned by the Swedish paper manufacturer Stora. In 1999-2007, it was owned by a group of Danish investors. In 2008, it was acquired by the French company Arjwiggins. The factory closed in 2012.

== Today ==
In 2020, C. F. Møller Architects and Niras created a plan for the transformation of the vast industrial site into a new mixed-use neighbourhood. Many of the old industrial buildings will be integrated in the new district.
