= Astrid Rosing Sawyer =

Danish businesswoman

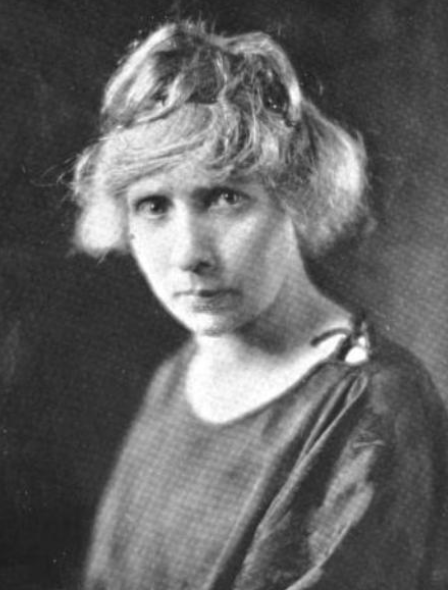
- Astrid Rosing Sawyer, from a 1922 publication
- Born: Astrid Scheel Rosing; 15 May 1874; Denmark
- Died: January 31, 1954 (aged 79); Chicago, Illinois, US
- Other names: A. R. Sawyer
- Occupations: Businesswoman, translator

Astrid Scheel Rosing Sawyer (15 May 1874 – January 31, 1954) was a Danish-born businesswoman and translator.

== Early life ==
Astrid Scheel Rosing was from Copenhagen, Denmark, the daughter of Ulrik Rosing and Anna Gustien. She emigrated to the United States as a girl in 1888, with her siblings and their widowed mother.

== Career ==
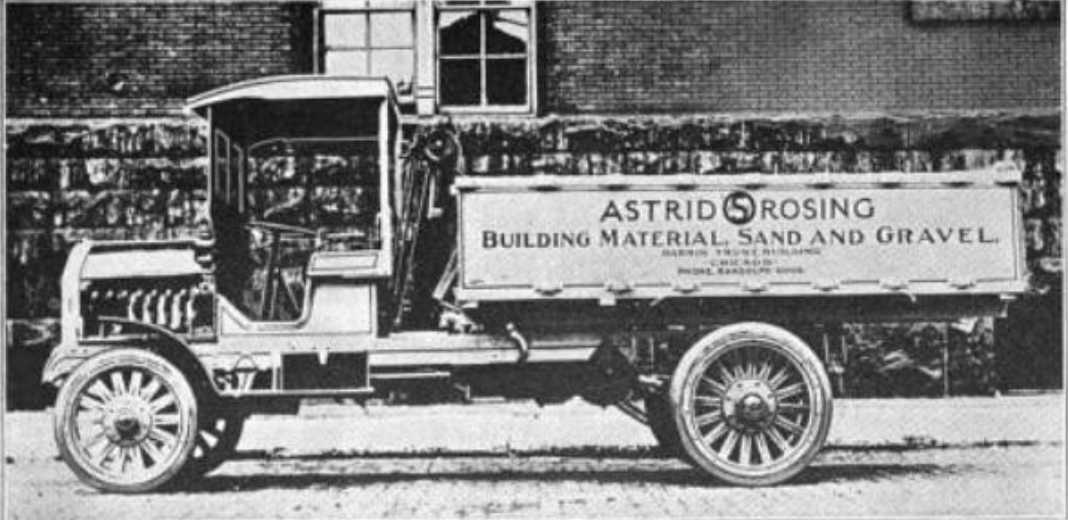
A Kisselkar truck belonging to Astrid S. Rosing Inc.; "I hesitated a long time before deciding to buy a motor truck," she explained to a 1915 trade magazine, "but now I wish I had bought it six months, yes a year ago."

In her teens, hoping to earn money for singing lessons, Rosing worked as a stenographer and typist at a building materials company in Chicago. In time, she learned the business, and formed the Astrid S. Rosing Inc., a successful building materials dealer. She owned a fleet of motor trucks (still a novelty in 1915 Chicago) and several warehouses and supply yards. "Men told me it was no business for a woman," she recalled later. "No, that didn't discourage me and I never for a minute had any notion of giving up." She spoke to the Illinois Clay Manufacturers' Association convention in 1917.

Later in life, Sawyer did literary translations from Danish to English, including a children's book by Torry Gredsted, The Castle of Contentment: Letters from a Jutland Farm (1937) by Gunnar Nislev, Kaj Munk's VIctory and He Sits at the Crucible (1944). She also translated Hjalmar Meidell's Henry VIII and Catherine Howard from Norwegian to English.

Sawyer was also co-founder and vice-president of the Chicago Equestrian Association.

== Personal life ==
Astrid Rosing married American engineer, Walter Percy Sawyer, in 1918, in Chicago. He worked at Astrid S. Rosing, Inc. "Never leave your work to find yourself a husband," she advised. "Let him find you." They had a daughter, Helen Marion Sawyer. Astrid Rosing Sawyer died in 1954, aged 79 years, in Illinois.
