= Carl Cohn Haste =

Danish pianist, organist and composer

- Born: December 7, 1874
- Died: June 4, 1939 (aged 64)
- Occupation(s): Pianist, organist, composer

Carl Cohn Haste (December 7, 1874 – June 4, 1939) was a Danish pianist, organist and composer. Blind from the age of 5, he studied at the Royal Danish Academy of Music. He was concert pianist, a music teacher at the Blind Institute, the first president of the Danish Association of the Blind, and the editor of the magazine "Nordens Musik". Most of the blind organists who were employed in the early 20th century were trained by him.

== Early life and education ==
Haste was born in 1874. He went blind when he was 5 after an eye inflammation. From 1883 to 1892, he was a pupil at the Blind Institute. Then, he studied at the Royal Danish Academy of Music from 1893 to 1895 under Victor Bendix and Orla Rosenhof.

== Career ==
In 1896, Haste made his debut as a concert pianist and, from 1898, he was employed as the Blind Institute as a music teacher. Most of the blind organists who were employed in the early 20th century were trained by him. Alongside his teaching work and organization work, he was regularly away on concert tours across Denmark, Sweden and Germany.

Haste was a member of the Danish Authors’ Society for Composers and Songwriters (KODA). He became the first president of the Danish Association of the Blind. He was also the editor, from 1919-1920, of the magazine "Nordens Musik" (Music of the North) published by Søren Jensen.

== Honours ==
In 1928, Haste was made a Knight of the Order of Dannebrog.

== Notable works ==
- Prelude and fugue in e minor (piano 1894)
- Prelude and fugue in g minor (piano 1894)
- Paroa symphony (1902)
- Prelude and intermezzo (piano 1919)
- Cantata for the Royal Blind Institute (1920)
- Holiday Scenes (piano 1920)
- Prelude and fugue in f minor (piano 1926)
