= Peter Hertz =

Danish art historian

Peter Julius Hertz (1 June 1874 in Copenhagen – 26 March 1939) was a Danish art historian and museum worker.

Peter Hertz was the son of Julius Hertz (1842–1920), a wholesale merchant, and his wife Henriette F. Hertz (1850–1921). Hertz became a graduate student at a private college in 1893 and took many philosophy courses. Until 1896, he attended a technological school, while he worked as a bricklayer and learned how to be an architect. Then he began independent art historical studies and eventually went to study in 1899 on a three-year trip to Germany and Italy. In 1901, he worked in London, but he began to travel for his studies in 1903, primarily in Italy, but also in the Netherlands.

During those years, he focused on Classical Architecture, obtaining a Doctorate in Philosophy. He was also interested in contemporary art in Denmark and wrote "Gennembruddet i 70'erne, Betragtninger i Anledning af Raadhusudstillingen og den Hirschsprungske Samling" ("The breakthrough in the 70s, Reflections on the occasion of Raadhusudstillingen and the Hirschsprung Collection" in Art, IV, 1902–03). In 1915, he was hired to be the curator of the Danish National Museum of Art. As his main interest began to shift more towards contemporary art, he started to advocate for it through making monographs and working on the biographies of L. A. Ring, Gerhard Henning and Kai Nielsen.

Hertz served on the board of the Danish Museum of Art Association and the Association of French Arts. In 1919, Hertz founded the Association for Contemporary Art and also served as its first President. From 1934, he was a member of the Board of the Rønnenkamp'ske Grant. He was knighted into the Order of the Polar Star.

His first marriage started on 16 December 1899 in Schöneberg town hall in Berlin, with pianist Karen Wellmann (born 24 September 1875) in Køng. She later married the painter Herman Vedel in 1906, and she was the daughter of doctor Carl William Wellman (1842–1885) and Mathilde Sophie Krebs (1845–1916), who married Olaf Ryberg Hansen in 1889 following the death of her husband. He was married a second time on 14 September 1906 in Copenhagen with the pianist Ina Sophie Oline Meyer (6 October 1882 in Copenhagen), who was the daughter of choral conductor and singing teacher Albert Meyer (1839–1921) and Camilla Oettinger (b. 1852). This marriage was also dissolved, and he married a third time on 22 December 1924 in Copenhagen to Olga Valborg Johnsson (born 17 March 1883 in Glumslöv, Sweden), daughter of proprietor Johan Johnsson (1855–1904) and Fredrika Wilhelmina Carlström (1857–1914).

He was portrayed by Herman Vedel in 1901, 1902 and 1903; Fritz Burger in Switzerland; Laurits Andersen Ring; and at least 1,932 other drawings, including some by Ludvig Find (Frederiksborg Museum) and Arne Lofthus.

== Works ==
- Studies of the Parthenon Female Characters in 1905.
- The composition of the Central Group of Parthenon West End Field, 1910.
- Catalogue of Painting Collection Ordrupgaard, Danish Painting, 1918.
- Catalogue of the Danish Exhibition in Stockholm, 1919.
- Catalogue of Kai Nielsen Memorial Exhibition, 1924.
- Gerhard Henning, 1931.
- L.A. Ring, 1934.
