= Agnes Smidt =

Danish painter and cultural activist (1874–1952)

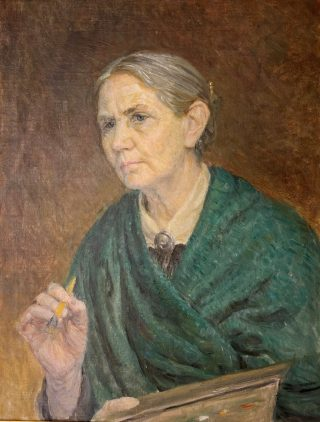
Self-portrait by Smidt from the 1920s

Agnes Smidt (1874–1952) was a Danish painter who is also remembered for supporting Danish culture in Southern Jutland while it was under German rule. Brought up in a Grundtvigian family, in 1915 she adopted five orphaned children and through her many contacts was able to provide support for many others. In February 2020, Ribe Kunstmuseum exhibited 60 of her works which included many portraits not only of friends and family but of influential figures of her times.

== Early life and education ==
Born in Lundsmark to the south of Ribe in Southern Jutland on 4 October 1874, Agnes Smidt was the daughter of the farmer Claus Moltesen Smidt (1839–1913) and his wife Ellen Marie née Petersen (1833–1917). As a result of the talent she showed for painting, she attended the Arts and Crafts School for Women in Copenhagen (1893–96) after which she became a pupil of the painter N.V. Dorph (1896–97).

== Professional life ==
After completing her education, she returned to her home town in Southern Jutland where she participated in activities devoted to Danish cultural life, including lecturing, singing and reading aloud. In the early 1900s, she moved to Copenhagen where she was able to submit works to the Charlottenborg Spring Exhibition in 1902 and 1904-05. In 1904 and 1908 she made trips to Finland while in 1907 she undertook a study trip to Paris. Her works include portraits of prominent figures of the day, including the composer Oluf Ring (1919) and the artist Kræsten Iversen (1927).

Smidt is also remembered for the efforts she made to take care of children. From 1916, she cared for five orphaned sisters and later adopted another foster daughter. After reunification, from 1921 she ran a folk high school in Lundsmark based on Grundtwegian principles.

Agnes Smidt died on 18 April 1952 in Erritsø Parish near Fredericia and is buried at Hviding Church near Lundsmark.

== Gallery ==
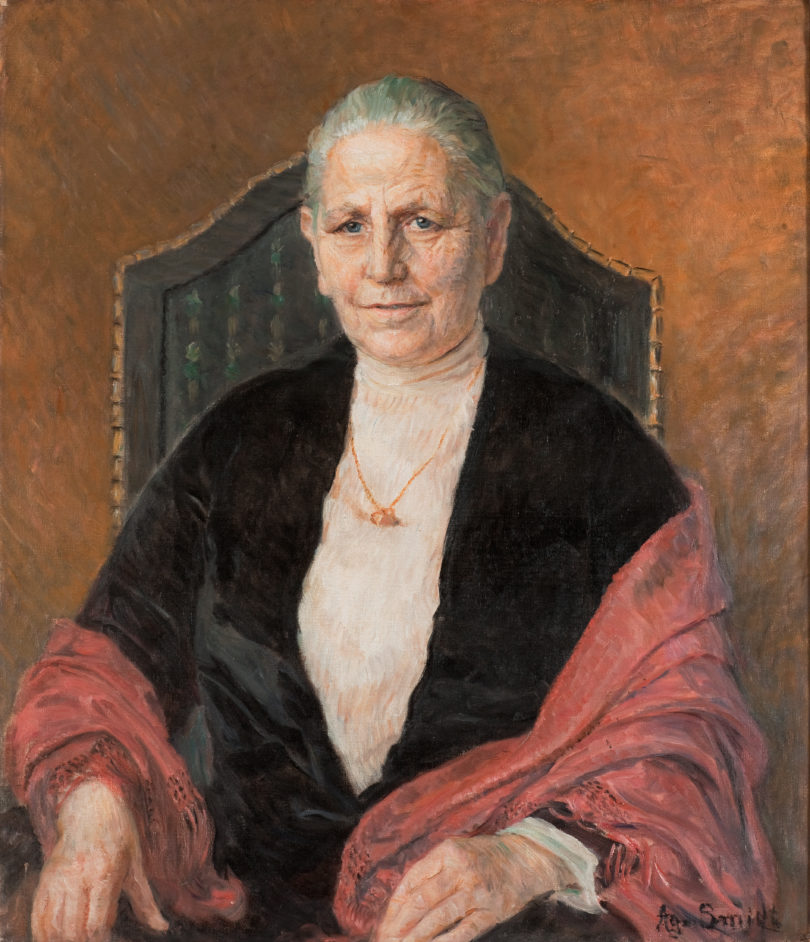
Johanne Louise Mohr by Agnes Smidt (1929)

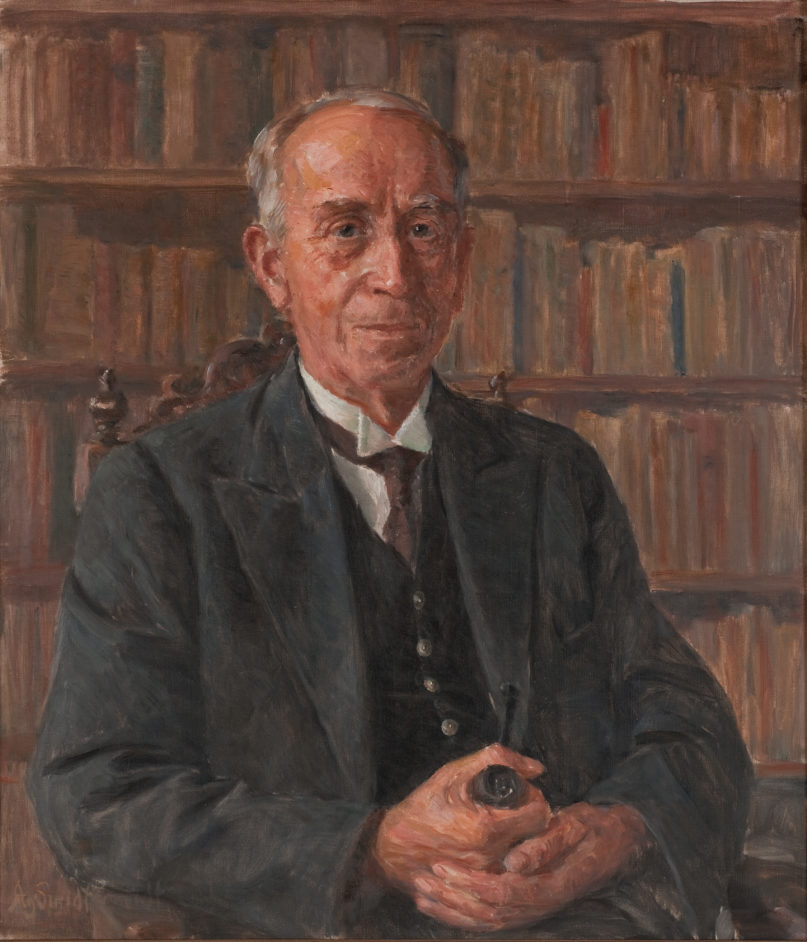
Johannes Haahr by Agnes Smidt (1847)

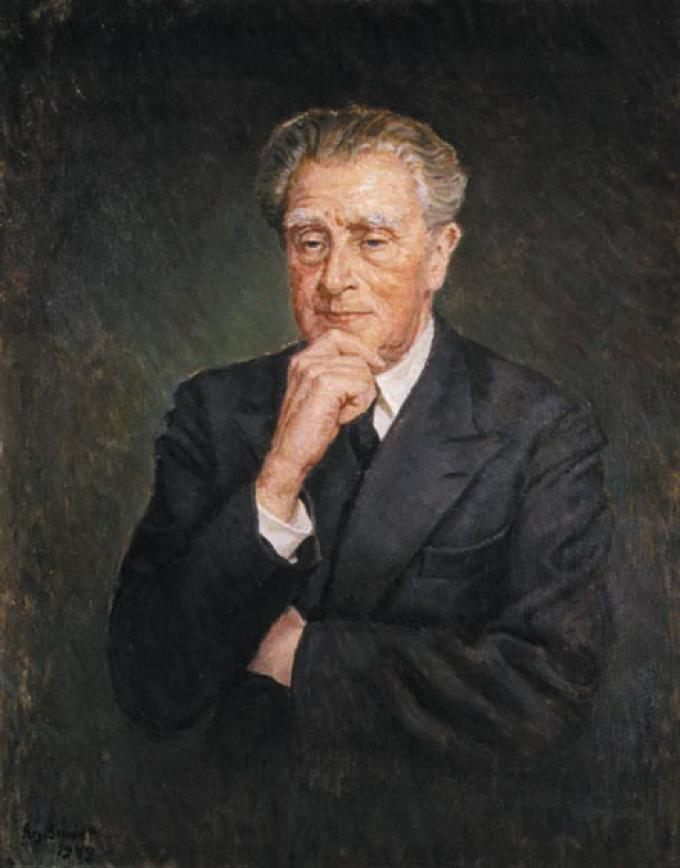
Otto Didrik Schack, Folkehjem, Aabenraa.

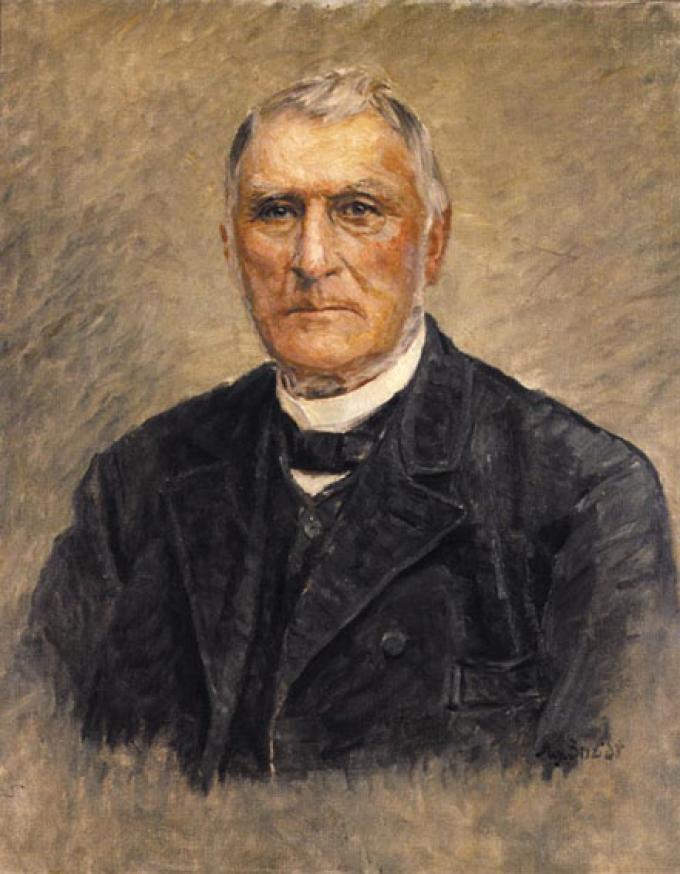
Peter Skay, Folkehjem, Aabenraa.

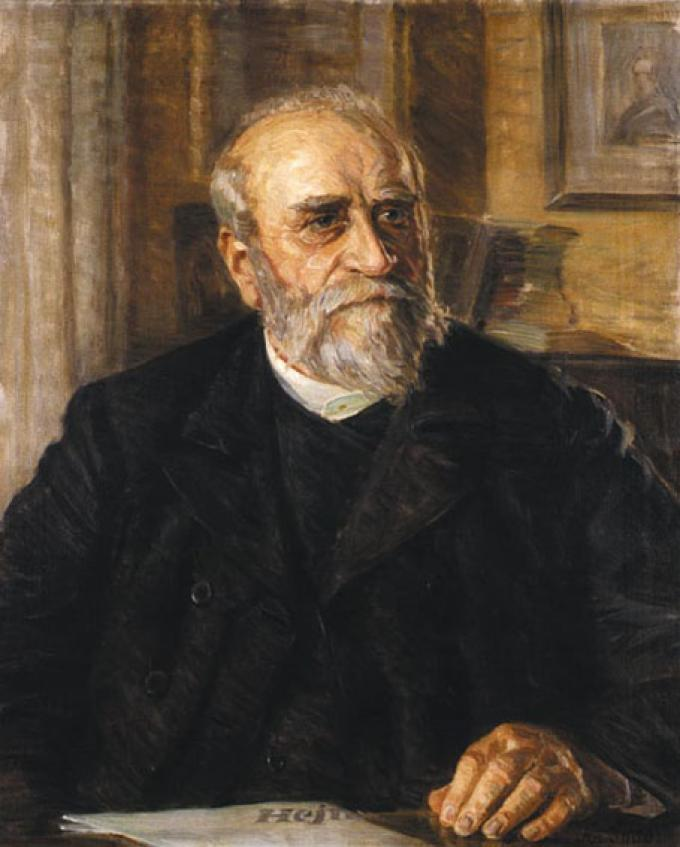
Jørgen Nielsen Hansen Skrumsager, Folkehje,. Aabenraa.

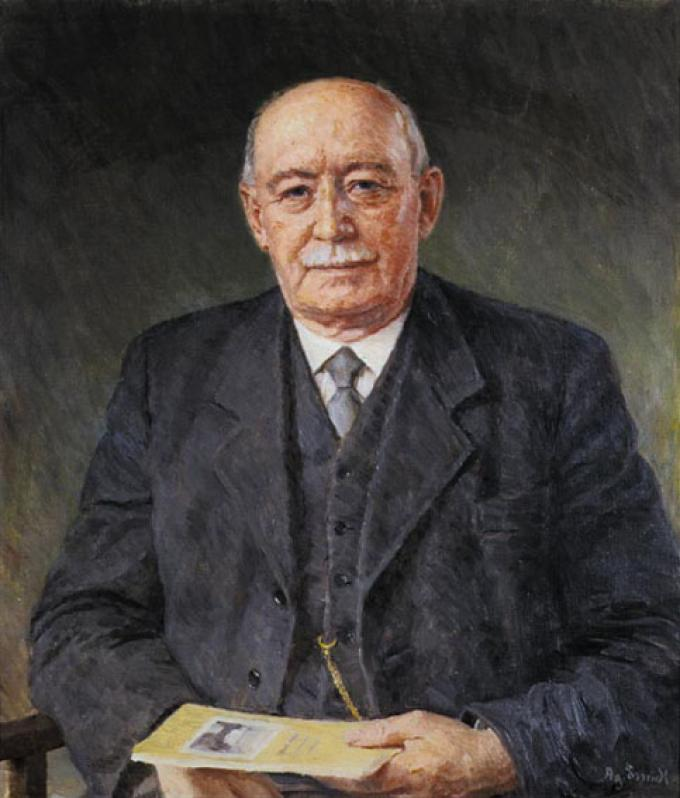
Hans Jefsen Christensen.
