= Ebbe Kornerup =

Danish painter and writer

Ebbe Kornerup (20 February 1874 – 6 May 1957) was a Danish painter and writer.

Ebbe Kornerup was born at Roskilde, Denmark. Kornerup grew up in an artist's home and received his own education as a painter. He was a student at the Royal Danish Academy of Fine Arts (1895-99) and was a student of Jens Ferdinand Willumsen at the art school of Kunstnernes Frie Studieskoler (1900-01).

His life was marked by long and extensive journeys across the globe. His art often reflected his travels. From 1898, he made numerous trips to North and South America, North Africa, India, China, Japan, Pacific Islands and Australia and became known principally as a travel book author.
