= 1947 in Denmark =

- Decades: 1920s; 1930s; 1940s; 1950s; 1960s
- See also: Other events of 1947; List of years in Denmark

Events from the year 1947 in Denmark.

== Incumbents ==
- Monarch – Christian X (until 20 April), Frederik IX
- Prime minister – Knud Kristensen (until 13 November), Hans Hedtoft

== Events ==
- 20 April – King Christian X dies, and is succeeded on the throne by his elder son, King Frederik IX.
- 13 November – Prime Minister Knud Kristensen resigns following a motion of no confidence, and is replaced by Hans Hedtoft.

== Sports ==
=== Football ===
- Ab wins 1946–47 Danish 1st Division. It is their sixth Danish football championship.

=== Swimming ===
- 10–14 September – Denmark wins five gold medals and one bronze medal at the 1947 European Aquatics Championships.

=== Other ===
- 29 June The Round Zealand sailing race takes place for the first time.

== Births ==
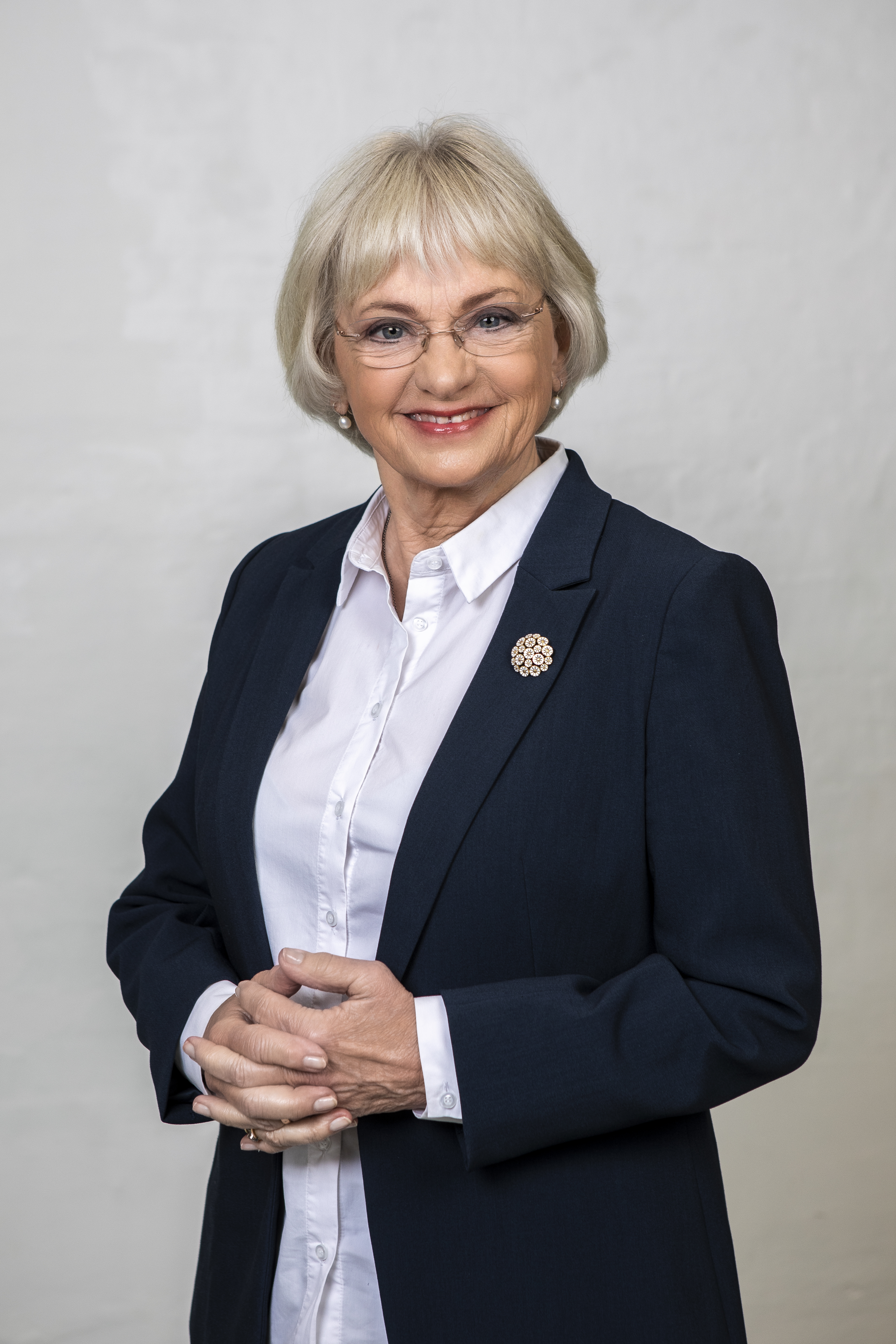
Pia Kjærsgaard.

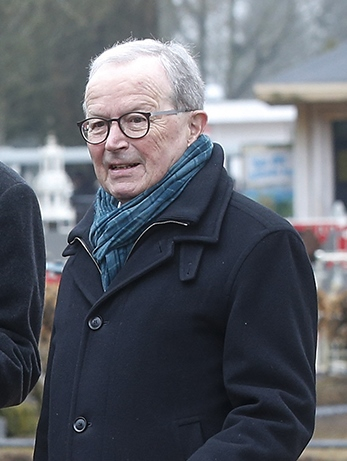
Kjeld Kirk Kristiansen.

=== January–March ===
- 23 February – Pia Kjærsgaard, politician

=== April–June ===
- 29 April – Jacob Holdt, photographer
- 30 April – Birthe Neumann, actor

=== July–September ===
- 12 July – Anne Marie Løn, author
- 17 July – Anders Koppel, musician
- 4 September – Claus Hjort Frederiksen, politician
- 10 August – Esben Sloth Andersen, economist
- 27 September – Jesper Tørring, athlete

=== October–December ===
- 27 December – Kjeld Kirk Kristiansen, businessman and investor

== Deaths ==
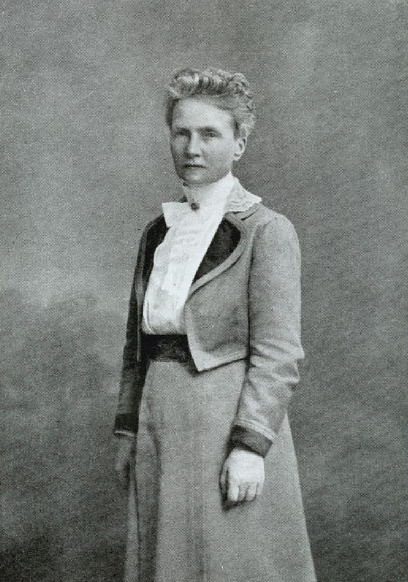
Hanna Adler.

=== January–March ===
- 4 January – Hanna Adler, educator (born 1859)
- 10 January – August Blom, film director, production leader and pioneer of silent films (born 1869)
- 15 January – Georg Carl Amdrup, admiral, polar explorer (born 1866)
- 13 March – Gerda Christophersen, actress and director (born 1870)

=== April–June ===
- 20 April – Christian X, King of Denmark (born 1870)
- 29 April – Ove Paulsen, botanist, professor at the Pharmaceutical College in Copenhagen 1920–1947 (born 1874)
- 4 May – Cathrine Horsbøl, furnituremaker (born 1872)
- 3 June – Sigurd Wandel, painter (born 1875)
- 18 June – Ejnar Martin Kjær, teacher and politician (born 1893)
- 25 June – Oluf Olsson, gymnast, silver medallist at the 1906 Intercalated Games, bronze medallist at the 1912 Summer Olympics (born 1873)
- 2 August – Sonja Hauberg, writer (born 1918)

=== October–December ===
- 9 December – Thøger Thøgersen, politician /born 1884)
