= 1879 in Denmark =

- Decades: 1850s; 1860s; 1870s; 1880s; 1890s
- See also: Other events of 1879; List of years in Denmark

Events from the year 1879 in Denmark.

== Incumbents ==
- Monarch – Christian IX
- Prime minister – J. B. S. Estrup

== Events ==
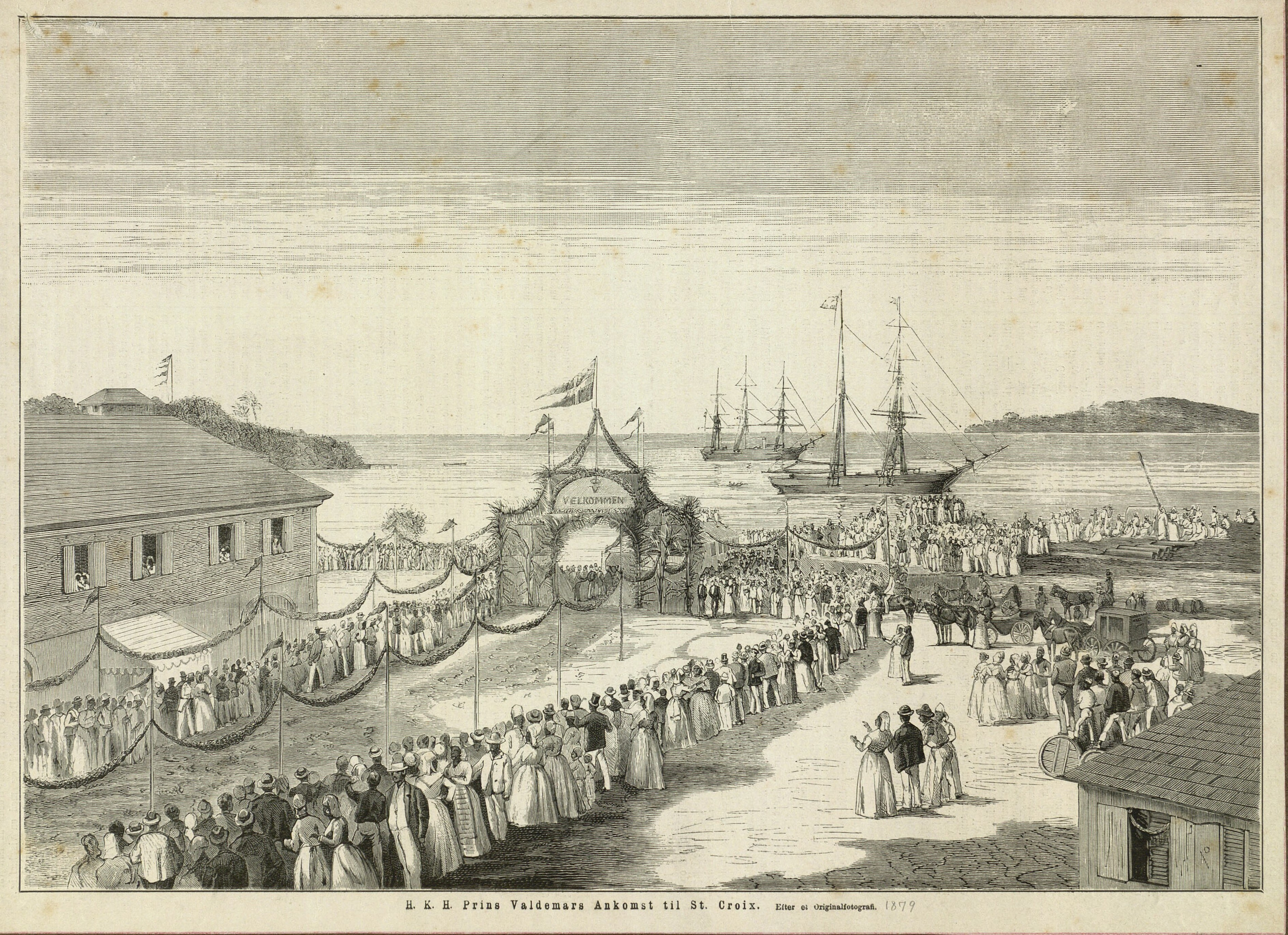
Prince Valdemar's arrival at St. Croix.

=== Undated ===
- The Danish Photographers Association is founded as the first organization for professional photographers in the world.
- The Thingvalla Line is founded.
- The Foreningen imod Lovbeskyttelse for Usædelighed is founded.
- Prince Valdemar visits St. Croix in the Danish West Indies.

== Culture ==
=== Theatre ===
- 21 December – Henrik Ibsen's A Doll's House receives its world premiere at the Royal Danish Theatre in Copenhagen, with Betty Hennings as Nora, Emil Poulsen as Torvald, and Peter Jerndorff as Dr. Rank.

== Births ==
=== January–March ===
- 5 March – Søren Marinus Jensenm wrestler (died 1965)
- 11 March – Kristian Hansen Kofoed, politician (died 1951)

=== April–June ===
- 16 June – Sigurd Swane, painter (died 1973)

=== October–December ===
- 18 November – Edvard Weie, painter (died 1943)
- 28 November – Viggo Jarl, sculptor (died 1965)
- 29 November – Jacob Gade, violinist and composer (died 1963)

== Deaths ==
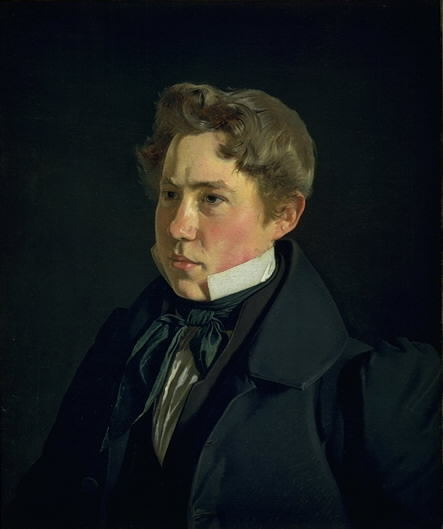
Peter Gemzøe.

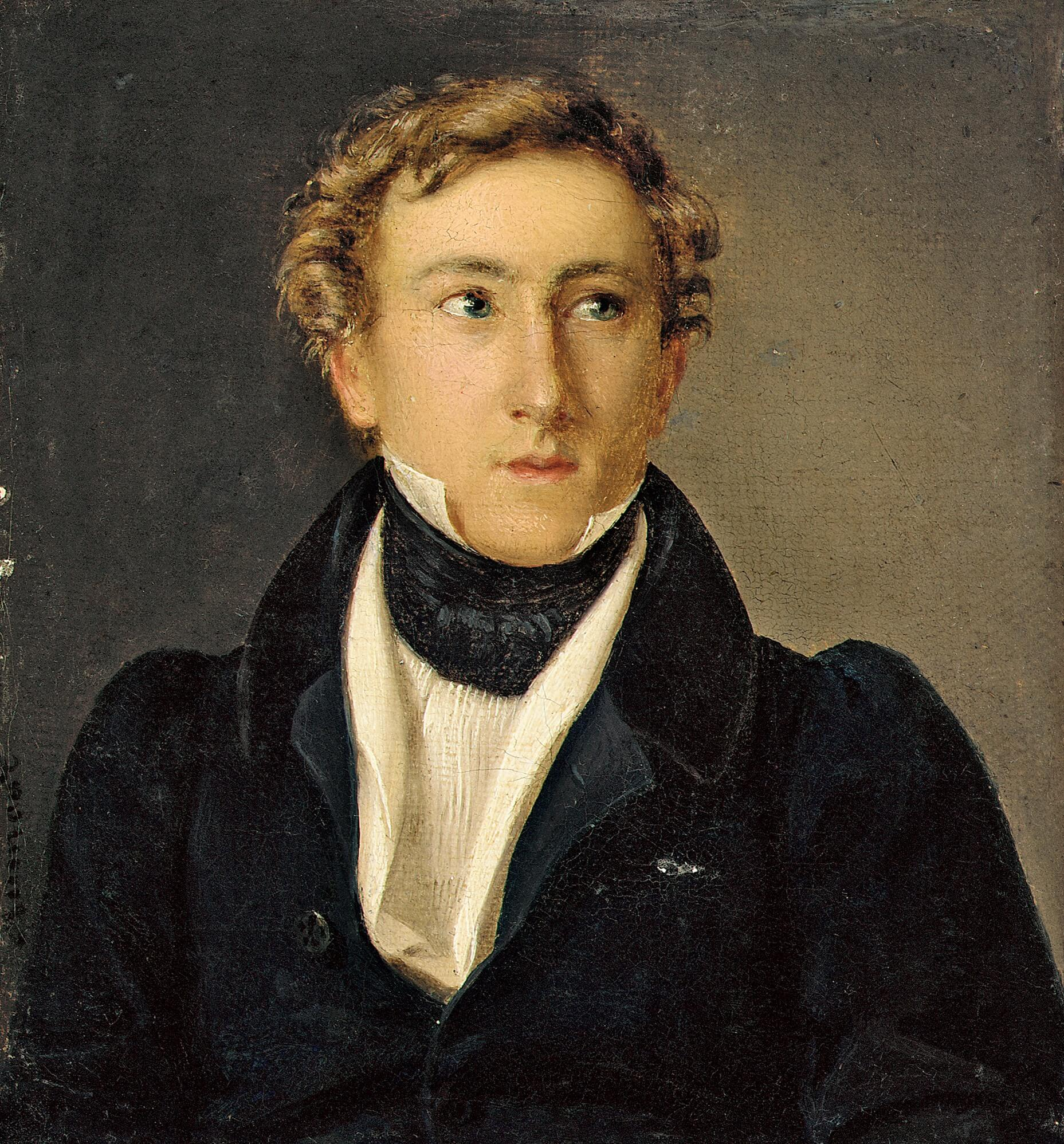
August Bournonville.

=== January–March ===
- 24 January – Carl Frederik Sørensen, marine painter (born 1818)

=== April–June ===
- 6 May – Louis Aumont, painter (born 1805)
- 5 June – Kristian Mantzius, actor (born 1819)

=== October–December ===
- 3 October – Peter Gemzøe, painter and lithographer (born 1811)
- 26 October – Andreas Aagesen, jurist (born 1826)
- 30 November – August Bournonville, ballet master and choreographer (born 1805)
