= 1826 in Denmark =

- Decades: 1800s; 1810s; 1820s; 1830s; 1840s
- See also: Other events of 1826; List of years in Denmark

Events from the year 1826 in Denmark.

== Incumbents ==
- Monarch – Frederick VI
- Prime minister – Otto Joachim

== Events ==
Undated

- Gold coins denominated as "Frederiks d'Or" (later as "Christians d'Or") are introduced.

== Culture ==
=== Art ===
- Wilhelm Bendz paints A Young Artist Examining a Sketch in a Mirror-

== Births ==
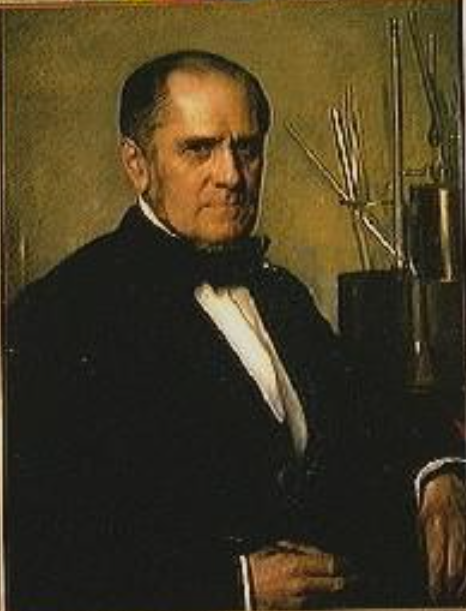
Julius Thomsen.

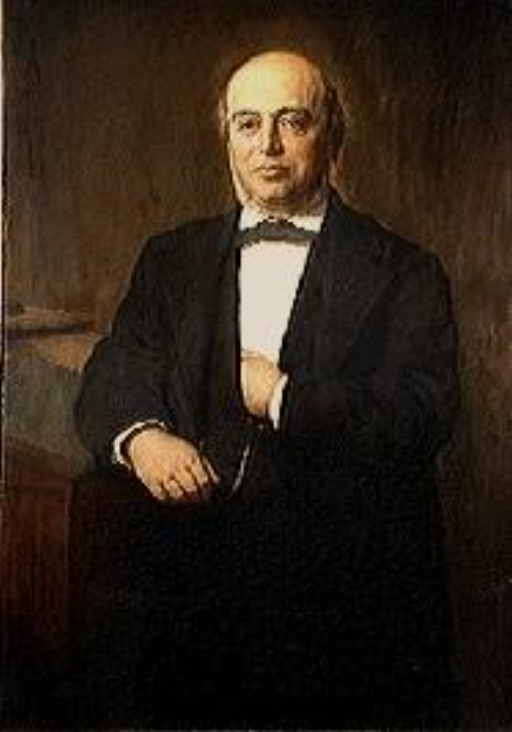
David B. Adler.

=== January–March ===
- 14 February – Frederik Christian Lund, painter and illustrator (died 1901)
- 16 February
  - Anton Eduard Kieldrup, landscape painter (died 1869)
  - Julius Thomsen, lawyer (died 1909)
- 27 February – Louise Westergaard, pedagogue and educator (died 1880)

=== April–June ===
- 13 May – Clara Andersen, dramatist and novelist (died 1895)
- 16 May – David B. Adler, businessman (died 1878)
- 18 June – Niels Frederik Ravn, politician (died 1910)

=== July–September ===
- 5 August – Andreas Aagesen, jurist (died 1879)
- 24 August – Fritz Melbye, marine painter (died 1869)

== Deaths ==
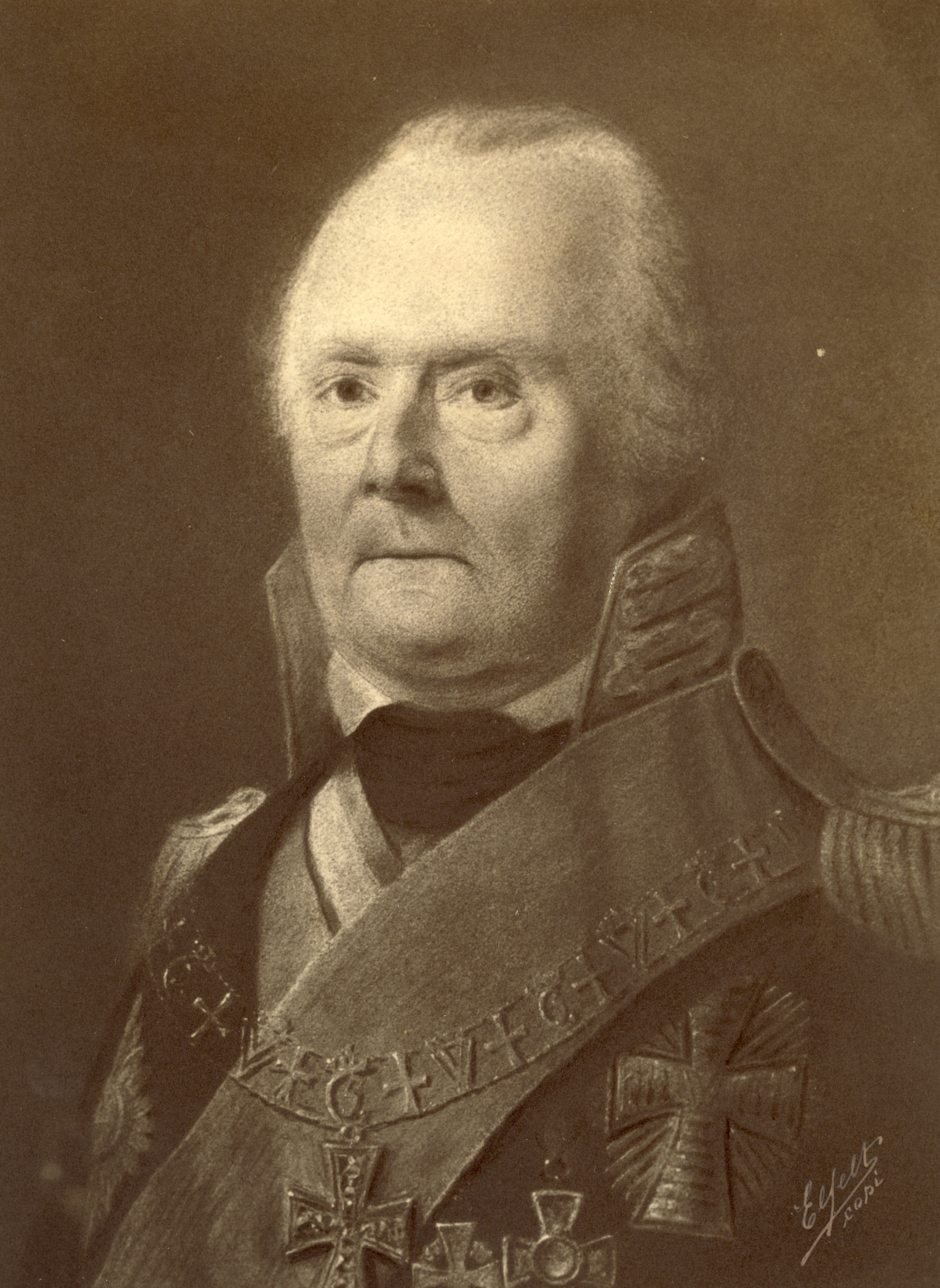
Poul de Løvenørn.

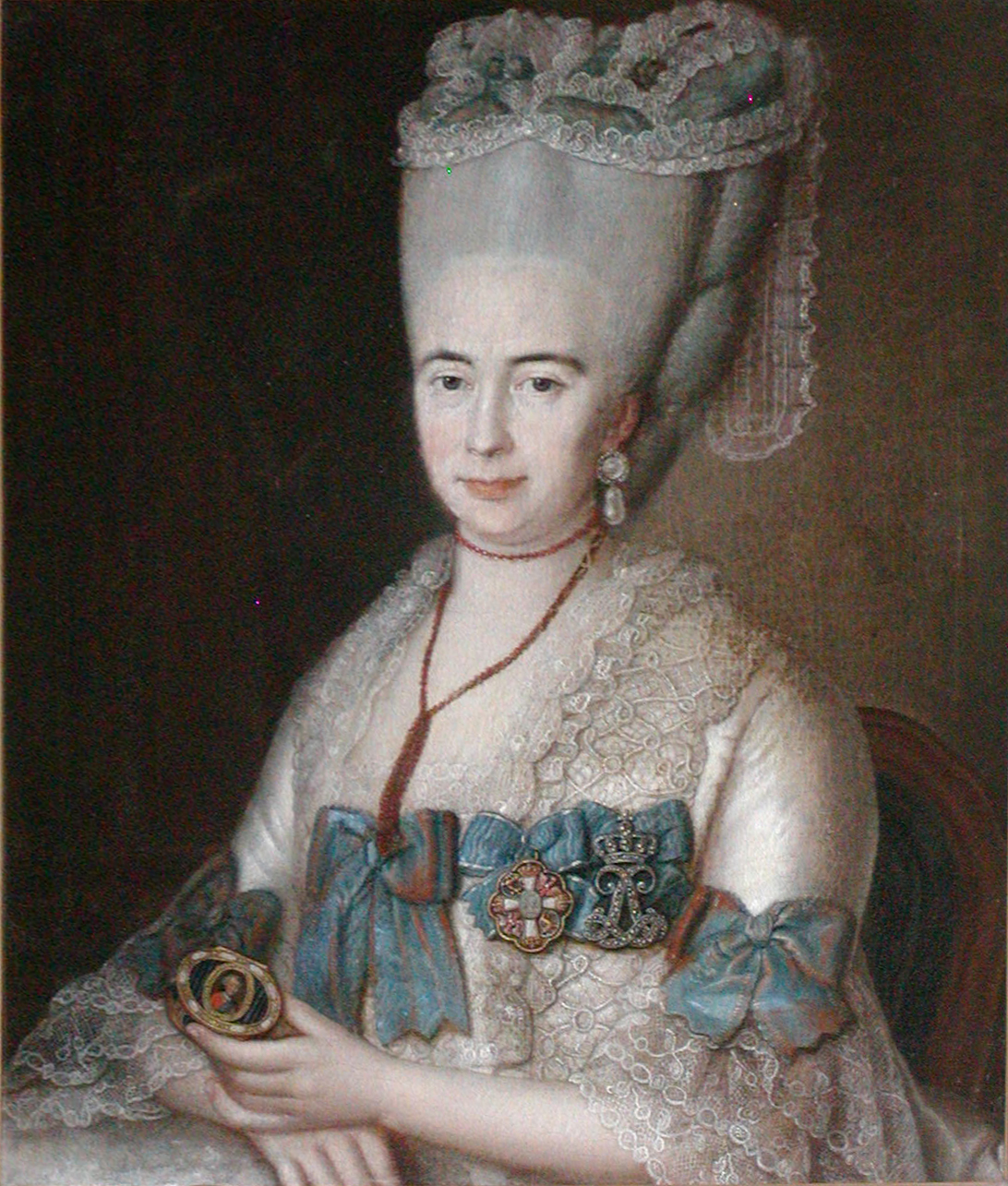
Margrethe von der Lühe.

=== January–March ===
- 16 March – Poul de Løvenørn, naval officer (born 1751)
- 24 March – Georg Nikolaus von Nissen, diplomat and music historian (born 1761)

=== July–September ===
- 4 August – Hinrich Braren, sea captain and author (born 1751)
- 10 August – Lauritz Holmblad, businessman (born 1770)

=== October–December ===
- 1 October – Margrethe von der Lühe, courtier (born 1741)
- 3 October – Jens Immanuel Baggesen, poet (born 1764)
- 27 November – Niels Peder Christian Holsøe, architect (died 1895)
- 14 December – Conrad Malte-Brunm, geographer and journalist (born 1775)
- 20 December – Jens Juel-Vind, chamberlain and landowner (born 1794)
- 28 December – Schack von Staffeldt, author (born 1769)
