= 1880 in Denmark =

- Decades: 1860s; 1870s; 1880s; 1890s; 1900s
- See also: Other events of 1880; List of years in Denmark

Events from the year 1880 in Denmark.

== Incumbents ==
- Monarch – Christian IX
- Prime minister – J. B. S. Estrup

== Events ==
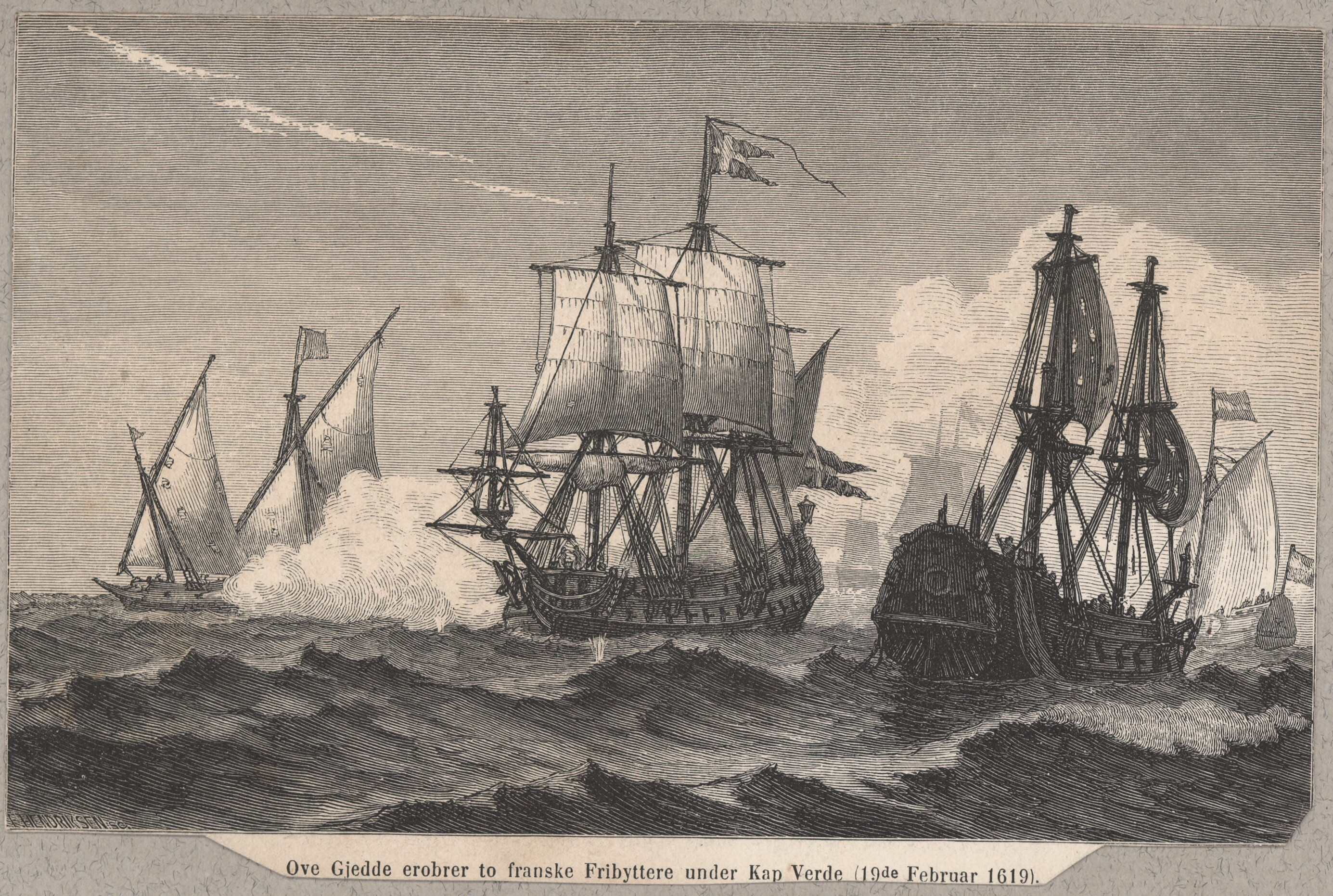
19 April: The banquet for the Vega Expedition at Børsen.

=== January ===
- 1 January – The Danish state took over Det sjællandske Jernbaneselskab (the Zealand Railway Company), forming De sjællandske Statsbaner (the State Railways of Zealand). The company is not merged with its Hutland and Gunen sister companies until 1885).
- 20 January – The Hillerød-Græsted section of the Gribskov Railway opens.

=== April ===
- 16 April – The Vega Expedition calls at Copenhagen.
- 18 April – A banquet is held for Nordenskiöld and the other members of the Vega Expedition in the Great Hall of Børsen in Copenhagen.

=== September ===
- 30 September – HDMS Tordenskjold is launched at Nyholm in Copenhagen.

=== October ===
- 2 October – The newspaper Skive Folkeblad is first published in the town of Skive, Jutland.
- 30 Octeober – The temperature drops to -11.9 °, the coldest temperature ever recorded in Denmark in the month of October.

=== Undated ===
- Tuborg Brewery starts brewing beer.

== Cultuure ==
=== Literature ===
- 9 December – Jens Peter Jacobsen's Niels Lyhne by Gyldendal.

== Sports ==
- 27 Aoruk – Handelsstandens Gymnastikforening us founded.
- 26 September – Aarhus Gymnastikforening is founded.

== Births ==
=== January–March ===
- 20 January – Ingeborg Hammer-Jensen, historian and philologist (died 1955)
- 14 March – Princess Thyra of Denmark (died 1945)

=== April–June ===
- 11 April – Stefan Rasmussen, footballer (died 1051)
- 29 April – Viggo Christensen, politician (died 1967)
- 11 May – Knud Degn, sailor (died 1965)
- 21 May – Edvard Nielsen-Stevns, writer (died 1949)
- 15 June – Niels Bukh, gymnast and educator (died 1950)
- 20 June – Julius Jørgensen, long-distance runner /died 1937)

=== July–September ===
- 1 July – Carl Carlsen, wrestler (died 1959)
- 18 July – Henning Hansen, architect (died 1945)
- 14 August – Viggo Larsen, film actor, director and producer (died 1957)
- 4 September – Dick Nelson, boxer (died 1922)
- 27 September – Marie Niedermann, actress (died 1967)
- 25 Aigist – Karl Kristian Steincke, politician (died 1963)

=== October–December ===
- 22 October – Julius Paulsen, painter (died 1940)
- 26 October – Knud Kristensen, politician (died 1962)
- 11 November – Ejnar Sylvest, physician (died 1972)
- 23 December – Ejnar Mikkelsen, polar explorer (died 1971)
- 26 December – Yutta Barding, fencer (died 1076)

== Deaths ==
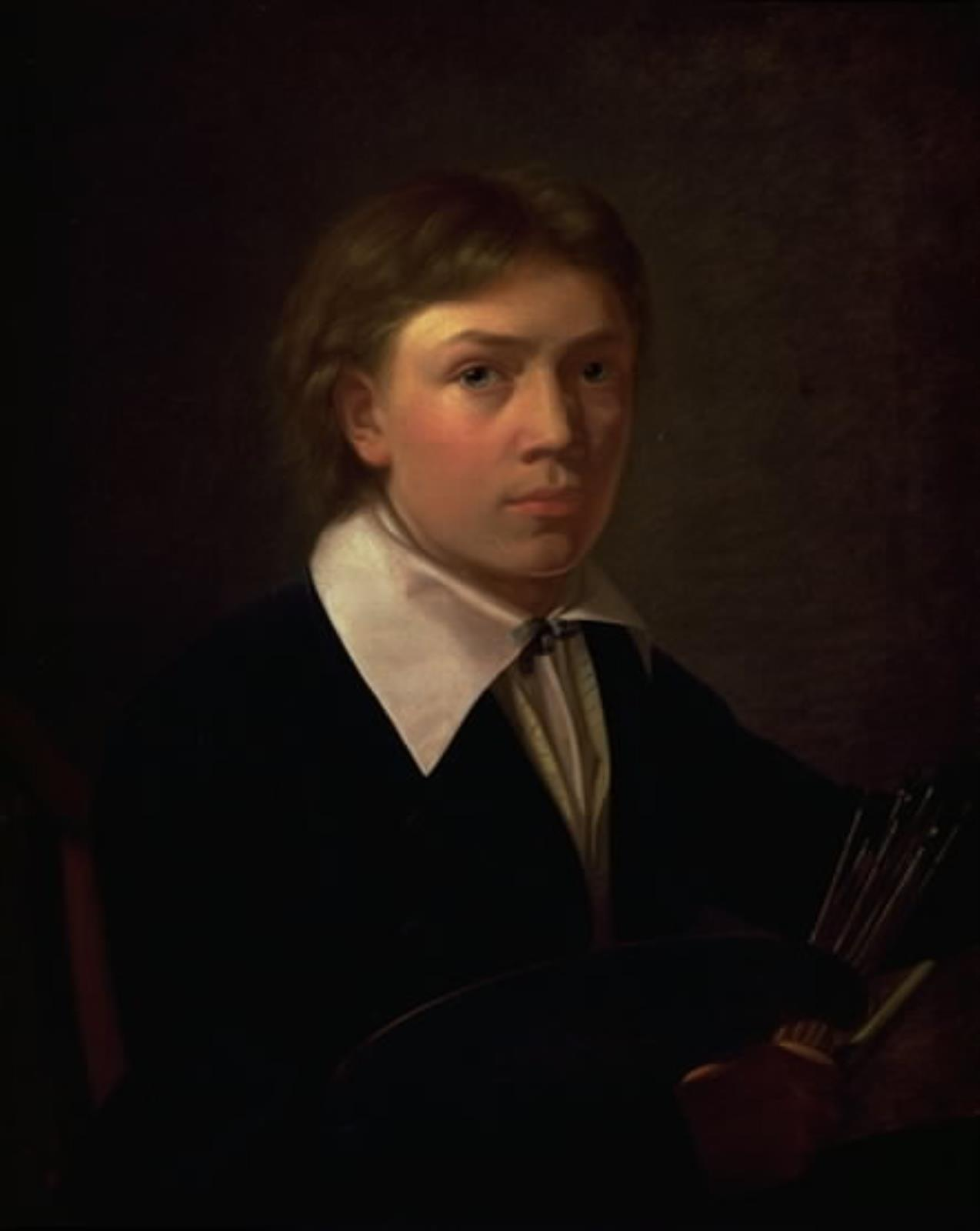
Constantin Hansen.

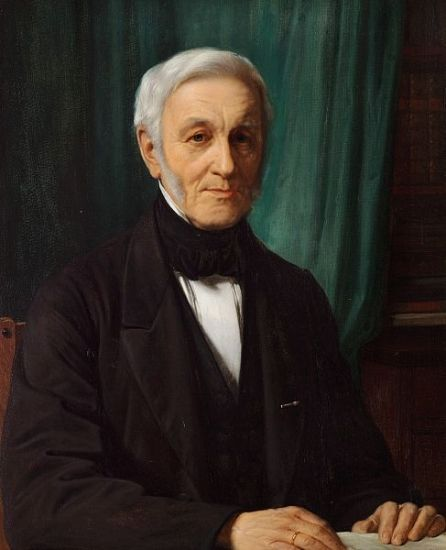
Johann Gottfried Burman Becker.

=== January–March ===
- 29 March – Constantin Hansen, painter (born 1804 in Denmark)

=== April–June ===
- 6 April – Louise Westergaard, pedagogue and educator (born 1826)
- 17 May– Christen Andreas Fonnesbech, lawyer, landowner and politician (born 1817)
- 24 June – Johan Carl Christian Petersen, seaman, expedition member, interpretor (born 1813)
- 25 June – Charles Ferdinand Léonard Mourier, Supreme Court justice (born 1800)

=== July–September ===
- 25 July – Vilhelm Petersen, painter (born 1812)

=== October–December ===
- 6 October – Johann Gottfried Burman Becker, pharmacist, writer and illustrator (born 1802)
