= 1945 in Denmark =

- Decades: 1920s; 1930s; 1940s; 1950s; 1960s
- See also: Other events of 1945; List of years in Denmark

Events from the year 1945 in Denmark.

== Incumbents ==
- Monarch – Christian X
- Prime Minister –
  - until 5 May: German military rule
  - 5 May-7 November Vilhelm Buhl
  - starting 7 November: Knud Kristensen

== Events ==
=== February ===
- 9 February – Estvan Svend Aage Wehlast was shot by the Gestapo while resisting arrest.

=== March ===
- 21 March – The British Operation Carthage, an air raid targeting the local Gestapo headquarters in the Shell Building in central Copenhagen, goes wrong and 123 Danish civilians, including 87 school children, are killed.

=== May ===
- 5 May – The occupation of Denmark ends with Nazi Germany's capitulation to the Allied Forces.

=== December ===
- 12 December – The David Foundation and Collections is founded as an independent institution by C. L. David with his art collection on public display at the top floor of his home in Kronprinsessegade in Copenhagen as the focal point of its activity.

== Sports ==
- AB wins their fifth Danish football championship by winning the 1944–45 Danish War Tournament.

== Births ==
=== January–March ===
- 2 January – Hans Edvard Nørregård-Nielsen, art historian (died 2023)
- 6 January – Margrete Auken, politician
- 17 January – Ib Michael, author
- 18 January – Kirsten Klein, photographer
- 26 January – Vibeke Sperling, journalist (died 2017)
- 27 January – Margit Brandt, fashion designer (died 2011)
- 11 February – Niels Jørgen Cappelørn, theologian and author
- 24 February – Mikael Salomon, film director, cinematographer
- 21 March – Henrik Nordbrandt, poet (died 2023)
- 28 March – Patricia Crone, Orientalist and historian (died 2015)

=== April–June ===
- 27 April – Carsten Koch, economist and politician
- 30 April – Jan Weincke, cinematographer
- 10 May – Morten Bo, photographer
- 14 June – Thor Pedersen, politician
- 31 July – Finn Laudrup, footballer

=== July–September ===
- 5 July – Ebbe Skovdahl, football manager (died 2020)
- 6 September – Niels Peter Lemche, theologian, political scholar

=== October–December ===
- 23 October – Kim Larsen, singer-songwriter (died 2018)
- 3 November – Peder Pedersen, cyclist and policeman
- 19 November – Jan Petersen, medallist and graphic artist
- 3 December – Hans Hækkerup, lawyer and politician

=== Full date unknown ===
- Allan Scharff, silversmith and designer

== Deaths ==
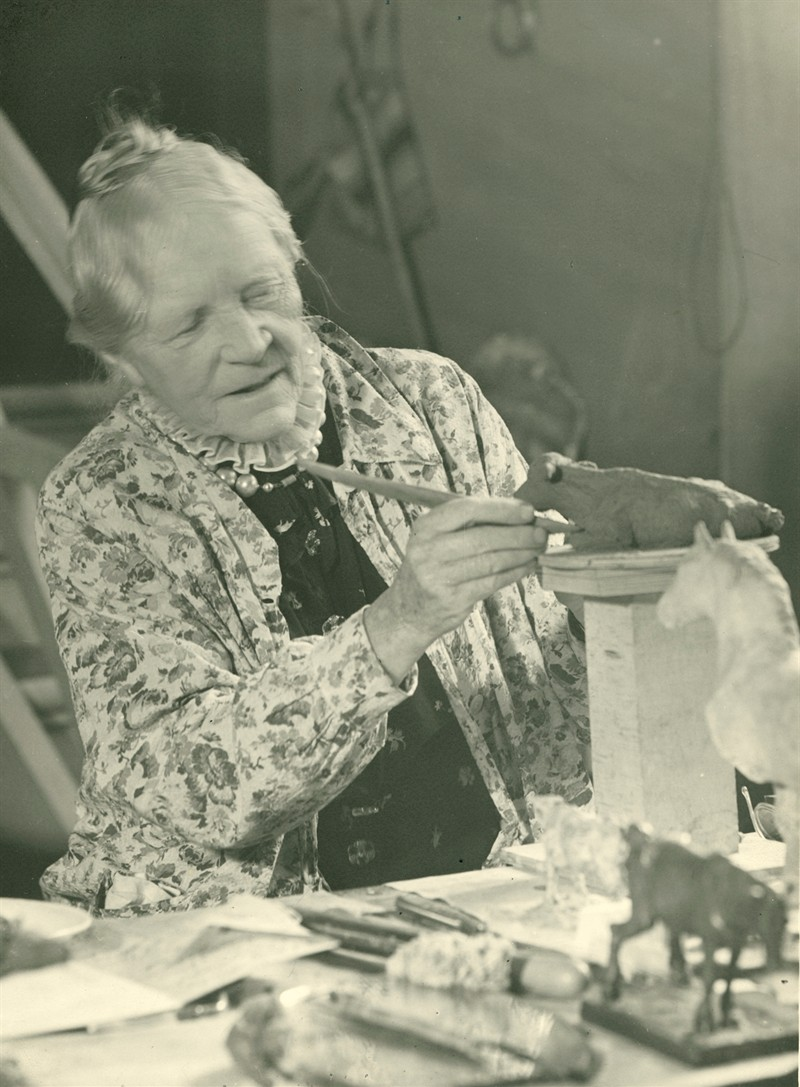
Anne Marie Carl-Nielsen-

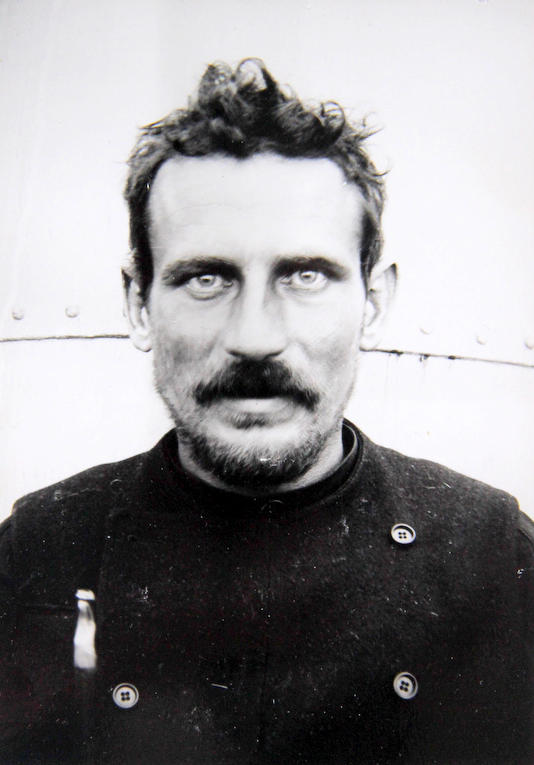
Aage Bertelsen.

=== January–March ===
- 15 January – Holger Damgaard, photographer (born 1870)
- 9 February – Estvan Svend Aage Wehlast, member of the resistance movement (born 1916)
- 21 February – Anne Marie Carl-Nielsen, sculptor (born 1863)
- 5 March – Albrecht Schmidt, film actor (born 1870)

=== April–June ===
- 30 April – Gudmund Nyeland Brandt, landscape architect (born 1878)

=== July–September ===
- 8 August – Henning Hansen, architect (born 1880)
- 9 September – Aage Bertelsen, Danish painter (b. 1873)
- 10 September – Otto Scavenius, diplomat, Foreign Minister for one day during the Easter Crisis of 1920 (born 1875)

=== October–December ===
- 2 November – Princess Thyra of Denmark (died 1880)
- 17 November
  - Elna Munch, feminist, suffragist and politician, one of the three first women to be elected to the Danish parliament in 1918 (born 1871)
  - Jens Olsen, clockmaker, locksmith and astromechanic, constructor of the World Clock in Copenhagen City Hall (born 1872)
- 17 December– Mikkel Hindhede, physician and nutritionist (born 1862)
