= Jan Petersen =

Jan Petersen may refer to:

- Jan Petersen (politician) (born 1946), Norwegian politician
- Jan Petersen (historian) (1887–1967), Norwegian archaeologist
- Jan Petersen (cyclist) (born 1970), Danish Olympic cyclist
- Jan Petersen (medallist) (born 1945), Danish medallist, draftsman and graphic artist

== See also ==
- Jann Ingi Petersen (born 1984), Faroese football
- Jan Peterson (born 1937), Canadian writer
- Jan O. Pedersen (born 1962), speedway rider
- Jan Pedersen (speedway rider) (born 1967), speedway rider
- Jan Peters (disambiguation)
