= 1878 in Denmark =

- Decades: 1850s; 1860s; 1870s; 1880s; 1890s
- See also: Other events of 1878; List of years in Denmark

Events from the year 1878 in Denmark.

== Incumbents ==
- Monarch – Christian IX
- Prime minister – J. B. S. Estrup

== Events ==
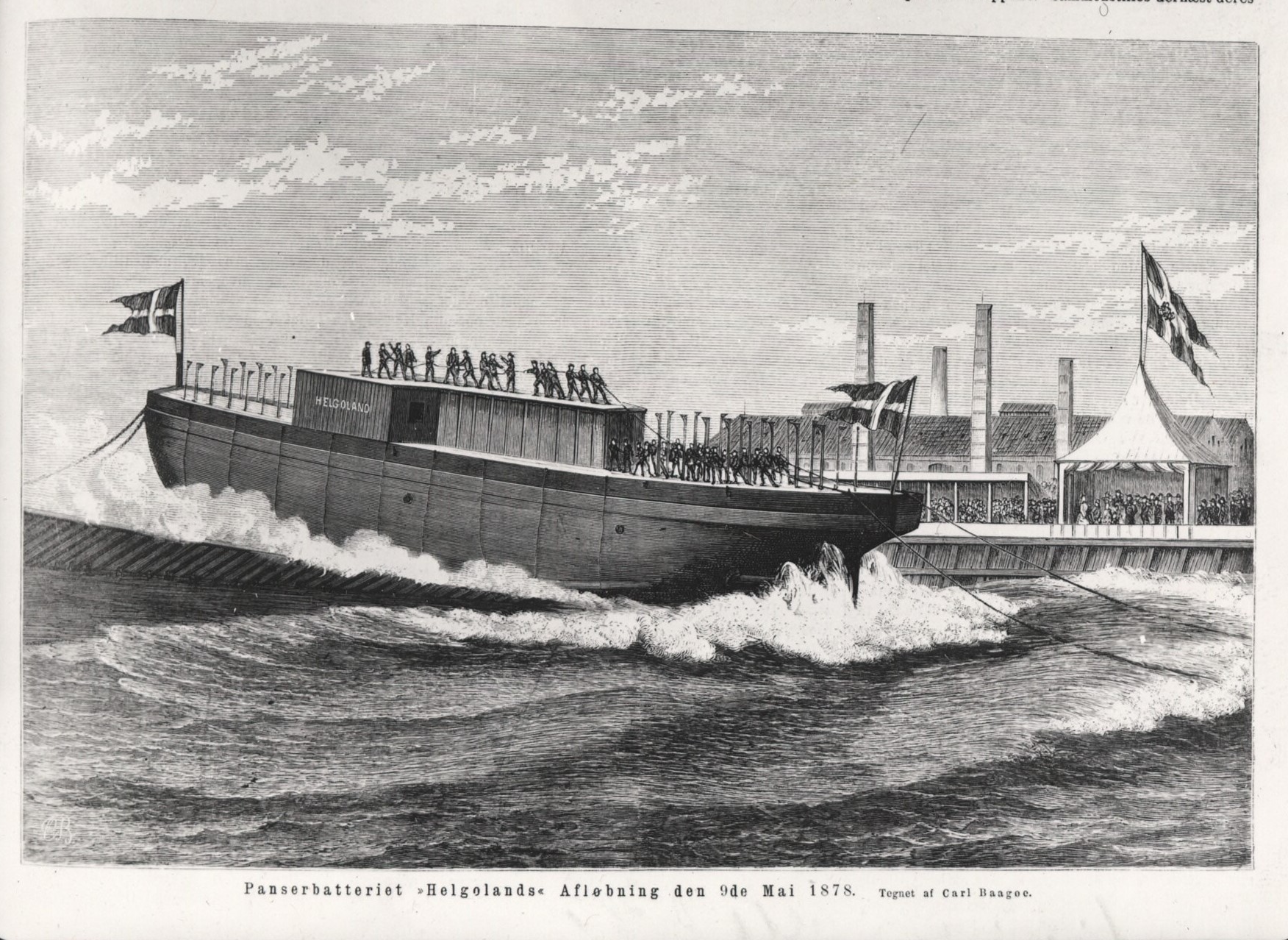
9 May: The panserbatteri Helgoland is launched..

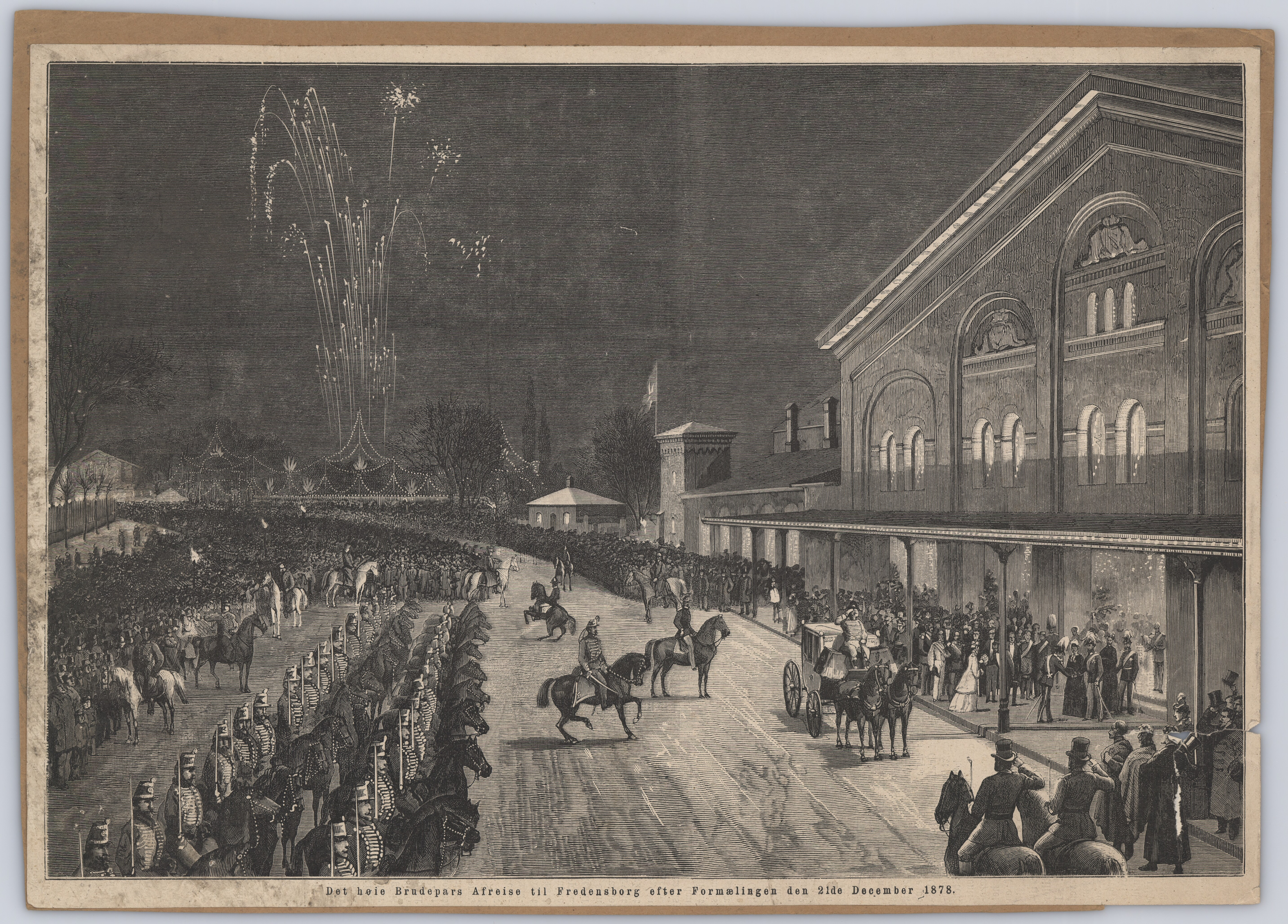
21 December: Thyra and Ernst August continues to Fredensborg Palace after their wedding ceremony.

- 3–9 July – The 11th Scandinavian Scientist Conference is held in Copenhagen.
- 9 May – The panserbatteri Helgoland is launched.
- 21 December – Princess Thyra of Denmark is wed to Ernest Augustus, Crown Prince of Hanover in Copenhagen. The couple continue to Fredensborg Palace after the wedding ceremony.

== Culture ==
=== Theatre, opera and ballet ===
- 25 September – The opera Drot og marsk is first performed at the Rotal Danish Theatre in Copenhagen.

== Births ==
=== January–March ===
- 1 January – Agner Krarup Erlang, mathematician, statistician and engineer
- 6 January – Adeline Genée, Danish-British ballet dancer (died 1970)
- 10 February – Johannes Berggreen, businessman (died 1963)
- 13 March – Lau Lauritzen Sr., film director, screenwriter and actor (died 1938)
- 11 April – Holger-Madsen, actor (died 1943)
- 17 March – Gudmund Nyeland Brandt, landscape architect (died 1945)

=== July–September ===
- 30 July – Jørgen Skafte Rasmussen, businessman, company founder (died 1964)
- 2 August – Princess Ingeborg of Denmark, duchess of Västergötland (died 1958 in Sweden)
- 25 September – Holger Thiele, astronomer (died 1946)

=== October–December ===
- 9 November – Povl Baumann, architect (died 1963)
- 24 December – Thomas Madsen-Mygdal, politician, former Danish prime minister (died 1943)

== Deaths ==
- 6 March – Harald Jerichau, painter (born 1851)
- 4 December – David B. Adler, businessman (born 1826)
