= 1967 in Denmark =

- Decades: 1940s; 1950s; 1960s; 1970s; 1980s
- See also: Other events of 1967; List of years in Denmark

The following lists events that happened during 1967 in Denmark.

== Incumbents ==
- Monarch – Frederik IX
- Prime minister – Jens Otto Krag

== Events ==
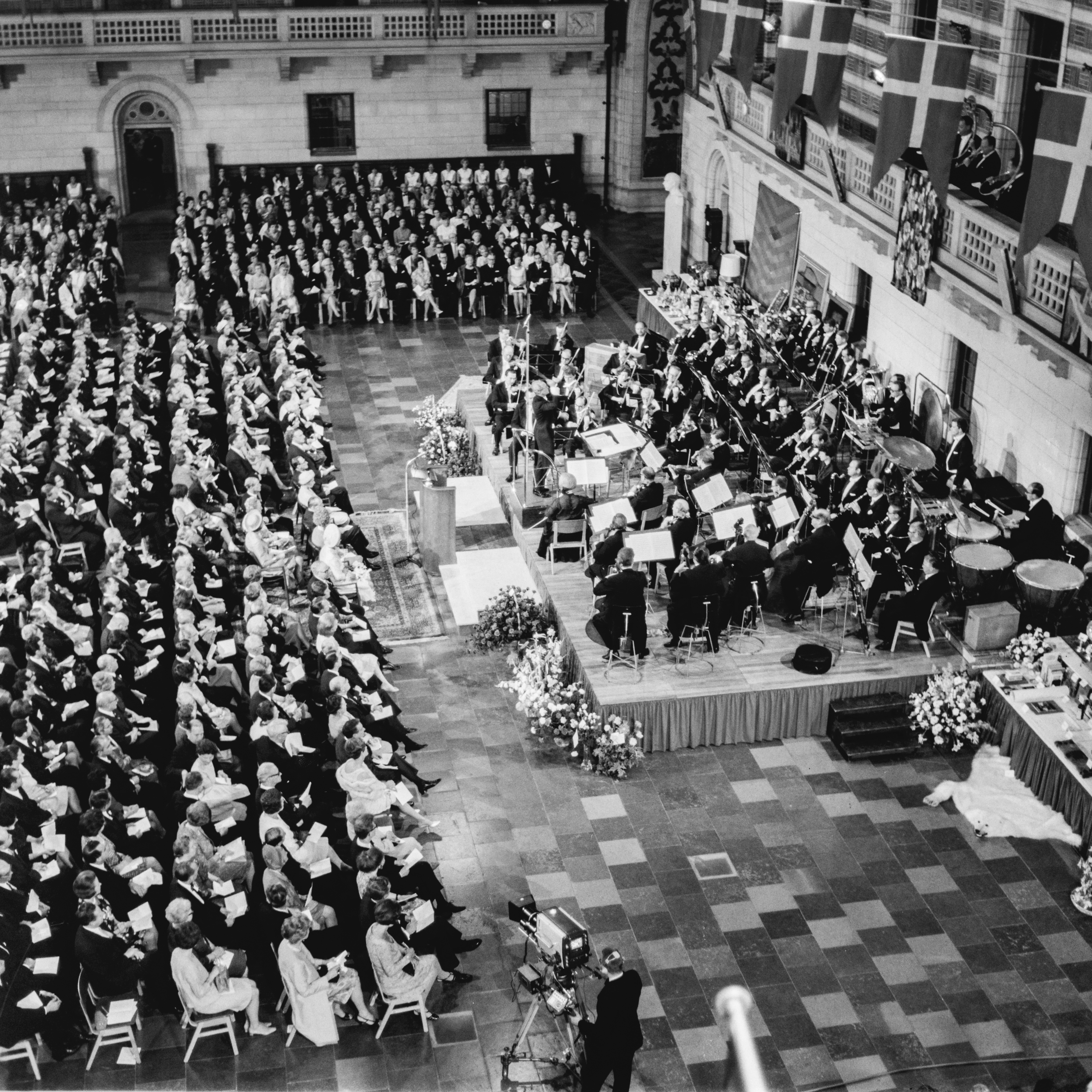
Celebration of Copenhagen's 800th anniversary at Copenhagen City Hll.

- 10 June – Princess Margrethe marries.
- 17 June – Copenhagen's 9++th anniversary is celebrated at Copenhagen City Hall.

== Sports ==
=== Sailing ===
- 1967 Star World Championships are held in Skovshoved.
  - Paul Elvstrøm and Poul Mik-Meyer win the race.

== Births ==
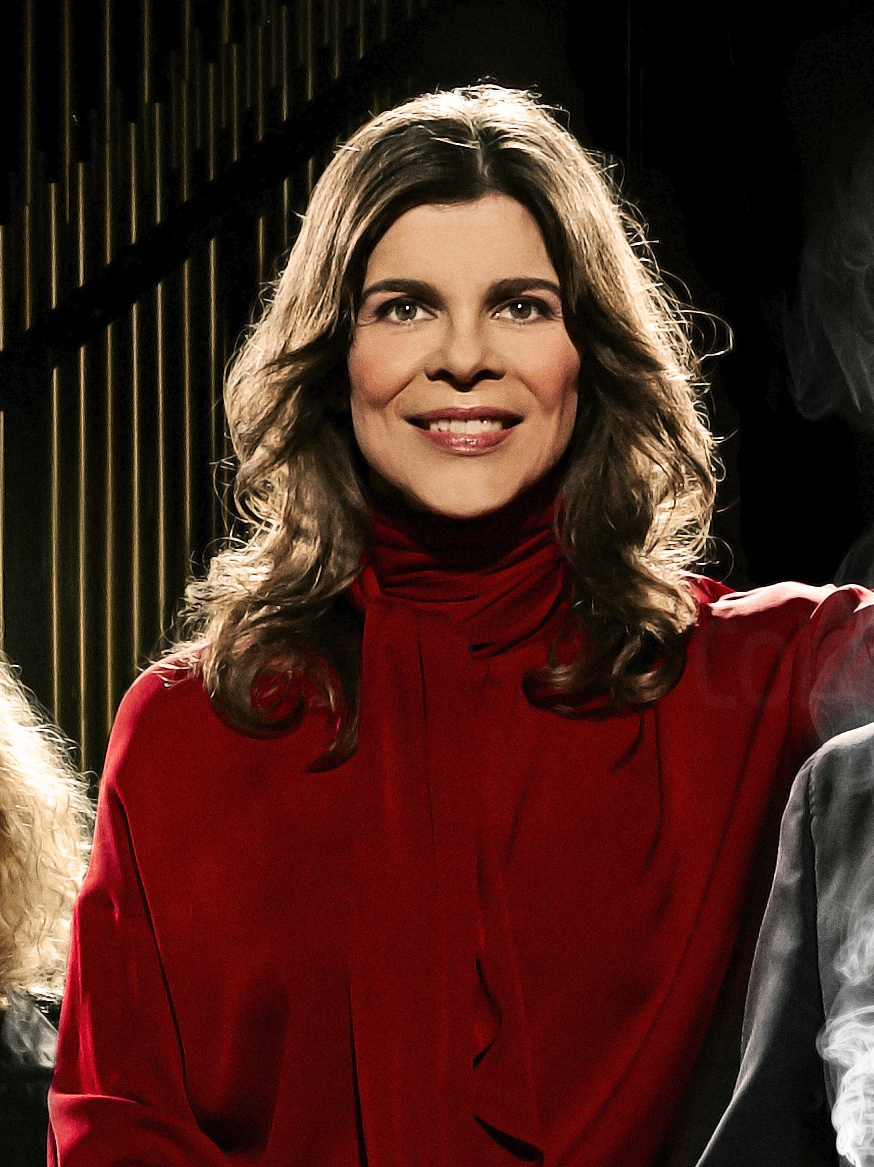
Ellen Hillingsø.

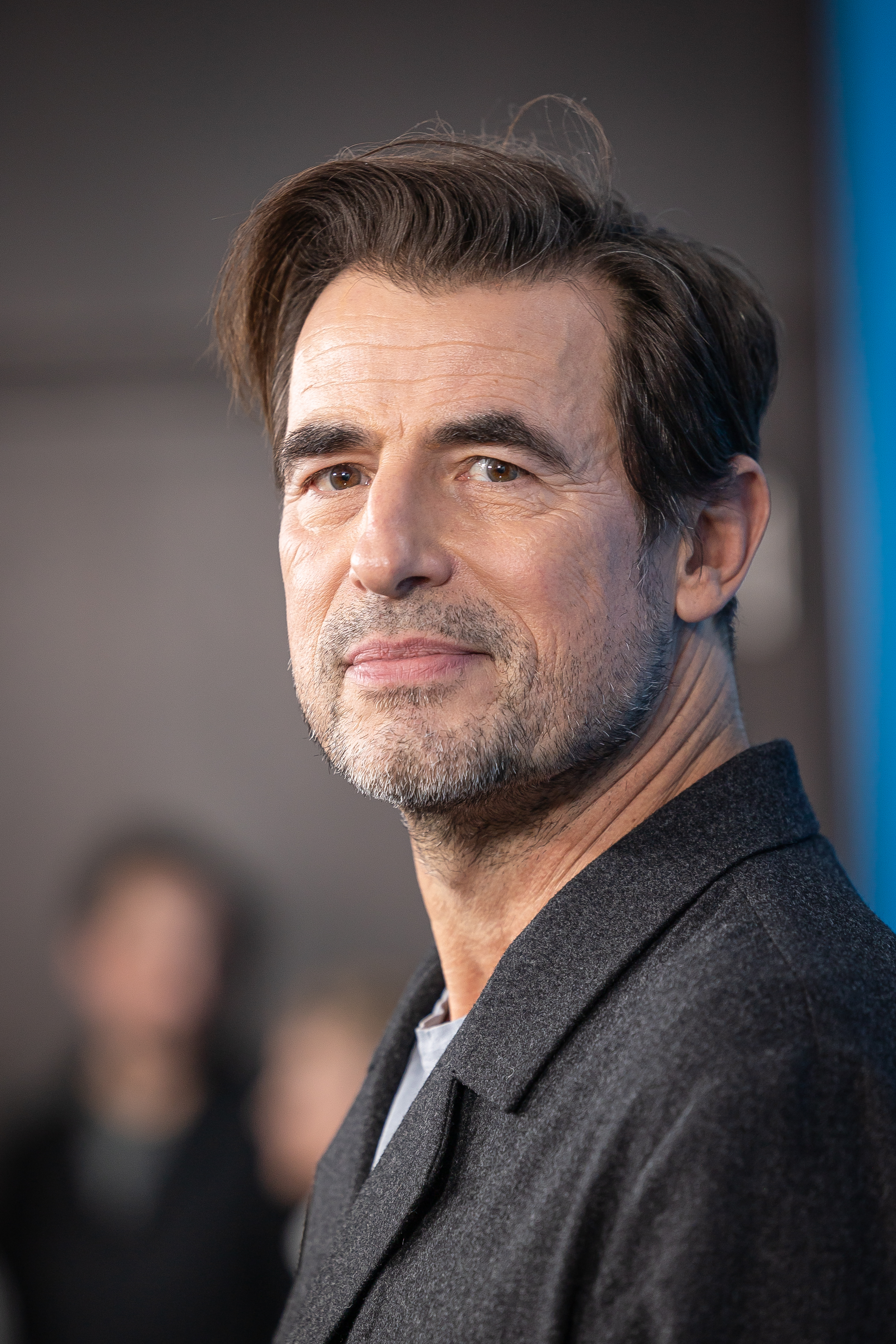
Claes Bang.

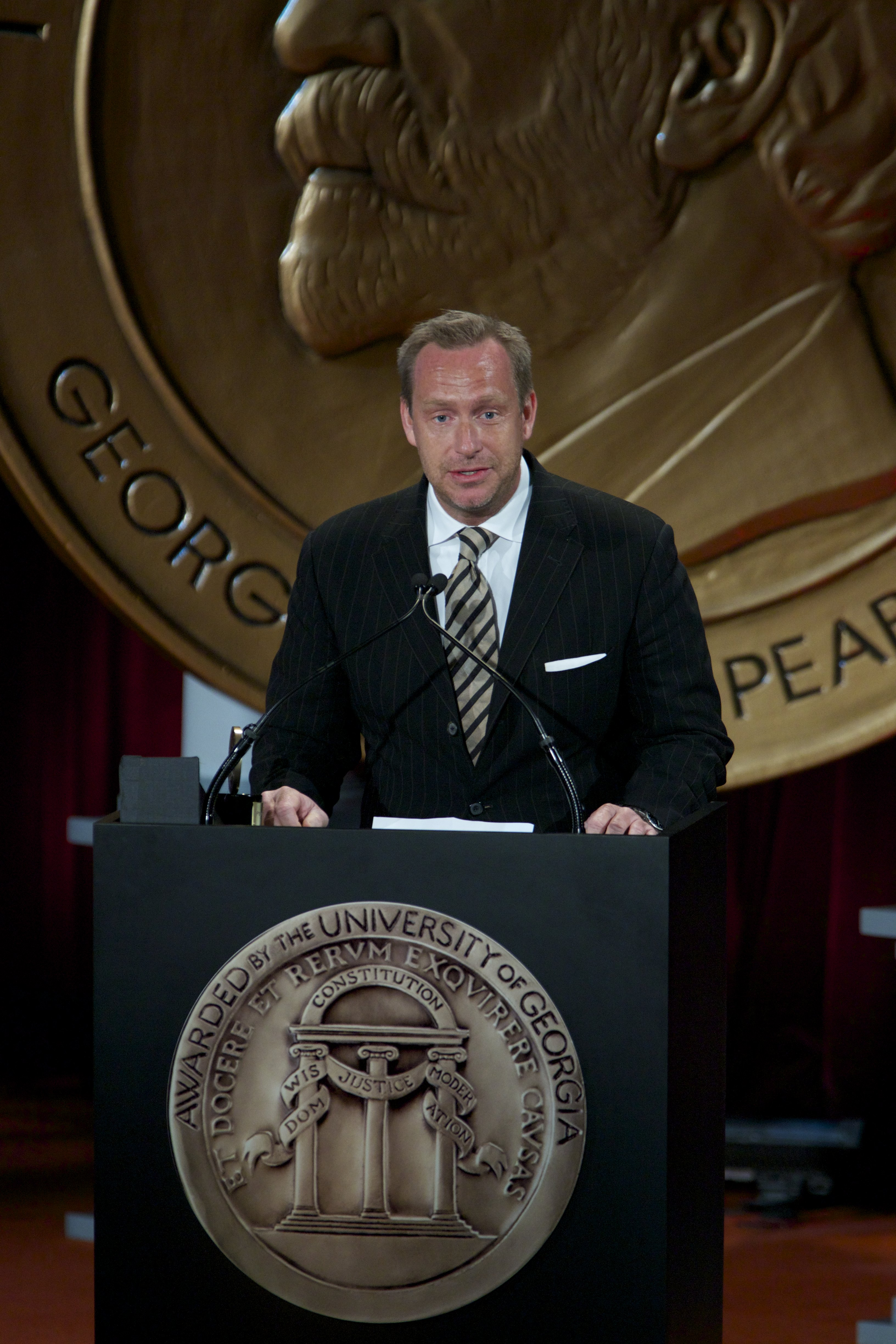
Adam Price.

=== January–March ===
- 7 January – Peter Reichhardt, actor
- 20 January – Sigurd Barrett, pianist, entertainer, composer, writer and television personality
- 14 February – Kasper Salto, designer
- 9 March – Ellen Hillingsø, actress

=== April–June ===
- 28 April – Claes Bang, actor
- 7 May – Adam Price, screenwriter, restaurateur, television chef
- 3 June – Lars Hjortshøj, stand-up comedian

=== July–September ===
- 7 July – Tom Kristensen, racing driver
- 27 July – Anette Støvelbæk, actress
- 8 September – Peder Hvelplund, politician
- 7 September – Peter Sørensen, diplomat
- 17 September – Anne Louise Hassing, actress
- 20 September – Mona Juul, politician

=== October–December ===
- 3 October – Carsten Dahl, jazz pianist
- 30 October
  - Nikolaj Hübbe, ballet dancer, artistic director
  - Jeppe Tranholm-Mikkelsen, diplomat
- 9 November – Svend Olling, diplomat

== Deaths ==
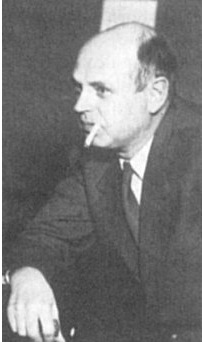
Poul Henningsen.

=== January–March ===
- 31 January – Poul Henningsen, writer, architect and designer (born 1894)
- 6 February – Hans Jacob Nielsen, boxer (born 1899)

=== April–June ===
- 12 May – Henry Nielsen, actor (born 1890)
- 23 May – Marie Niedermann, actress (born 1880)
- 24 June – Kai Normann Andersen, composer (born 1900)
- 30 June – Harald Hansen, painter (born 1890)

=== July–September ===
- 3 July – Rasmus Hansen, gymnast (born 1885)
- 9 August – Viggo Christensen, politician (died 1880)
- 16 September – Gerhard Henning, Swedish-Danish sculptor (born 1880)

=== October–December ===
- 21 October – Ejnar Hertzsprung, chemist and astronomer (born 1873)
