= Jan Peters =

Jan Peters may refer to:

- Jan Peters (footballer, born 1953), Dutch footballer who played in one match for the Netherlands national football team in 1979
- Jan Peters (footballer, born 1954), Dutch footballer and coach
- Jan Peters (computer scientist) (born 1976), German computer scientist
- Jan Peters (engineer), British engineer
- Jēkabs Peterss (1886–1938), also known as "Jan Peters", Soviet revolutionary

== See also ==
- Jan Petersen (disambiguation)
