= 1881 in Denmark =

- Decades: 1860s; 1870s; 1880s; 1890s; 1900s
- See also: Other events of 1881; List of years in Denmark

Events from the year 1881 in Denmark.

== Incumbents ==
- Monarch – Christian IX
- Prime minister – J. B. S. Estrup

== Events ==
=== May ===
- 24 May – the May 1881 Danish Folketing election is held.

=== July ===
- 26 July – the July 1881 Danish Folketing election is held.

=== September ===
- 1 September – Rysensteen Gymnasium is established in Copenhagen.
- 21 September – the Statue of Niels Juel, created by the sculptor Theobald Stein, is unveiled in 1881 at Holmens Kanal.

=== October ===
- 1 October – The Herning–Skjern section of the Skanderborg–Skjern railway line opens.

=== Undated ===
- The Neye luggage company is established in Copenhagen.
- Danish Distillers open in Aalborg.
- De Danske Spritfabrikker is founded by C.F. Tietgen, Isidor Henius and C.A. Olesen through the merger of a number of existing distilleries.
- Copenhagen Business College is founded.

== Births ==
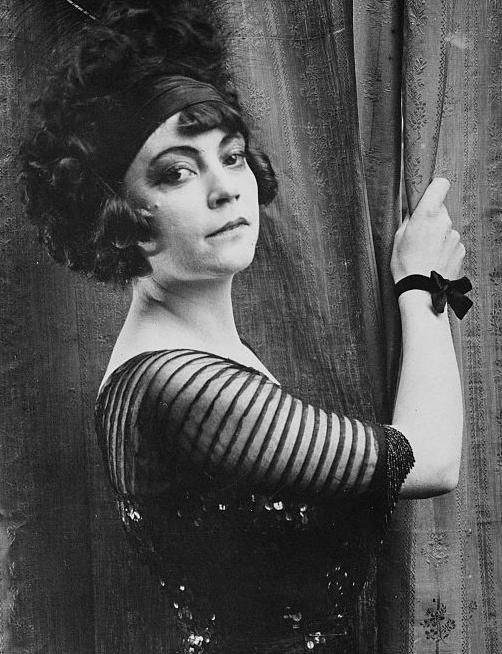
Asta Nielsen.

=== January–March ===
- 15 January – Børge Nyrop, painter (died 1948)

=== April–June ===
- 24 April – Harald Giersing, painter (died 1927)
- 10 May – Karen Poulsen, actress (died 1053)

=== July–September ===
- 6 July – Nancy Dalberg, composer (died 1949)
- 3 August – Birger Wøllner Gaarn, composer and organist (died 1949)
- 23 July – Frits Holm, journalist, author and explorer (died 1930 in the United States)
- 26 July – Harriet Bloch, actress (died 1975)
- 11 September – Asta Nielsen, actress (died 1972)

=== October–December ===
- 16 October – Vilhelm Buhl, politician (died 1954)
- 16 October – Henry Rambusch, footballer (died 1954)
- 23 October – Axel Jørgensen, composer (died 1947)
- 13 November – Carl Schenstrøm, actor (died 1942)
- 25 November – Peder Gram, composer and organist (died 1956)
- 8 December – Anna Henriques-Nielsen, actress (died 1962)

== Deaths ==
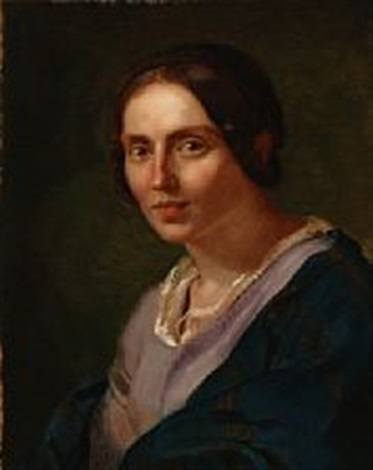
Elisabeth Jerichau-Baumann.

=== January–March ===
- 9 March – Caroline Amalie of Augustenburg, Queen of Denmark (born 1796)
- 31 March – Princess Caroline of Denmark (born 1793)

=== April–June ===
- 11 May – Elisabeth Jerichau-Baumann, painter (born 1819 in Poland)
- 21 June – Emil Normann, painter (born 1798)
- 31 May – Emmerik Høegh-Guldberg, painter (died 1807)

=== Kily–September ===
- 20 September – Martin Hammerich, literary historian and educator (Born 1811)
- 24 September – Petrine Fredstrup, ballet dancer (born 1827)
