= 1875 in Denmark =

- Decades: 1850s; 1860s; 1870s; 1880s; 1890s
- See also: Other events of 1875; List of years in Denmark

Events from the year 1875 in Denmark.

== Incumbents ==
- Monarch – Christian IX
- Prime minister – Christen Andreas Fonnesbech (until 11 June), J. B. S. Estrup

== Events ==
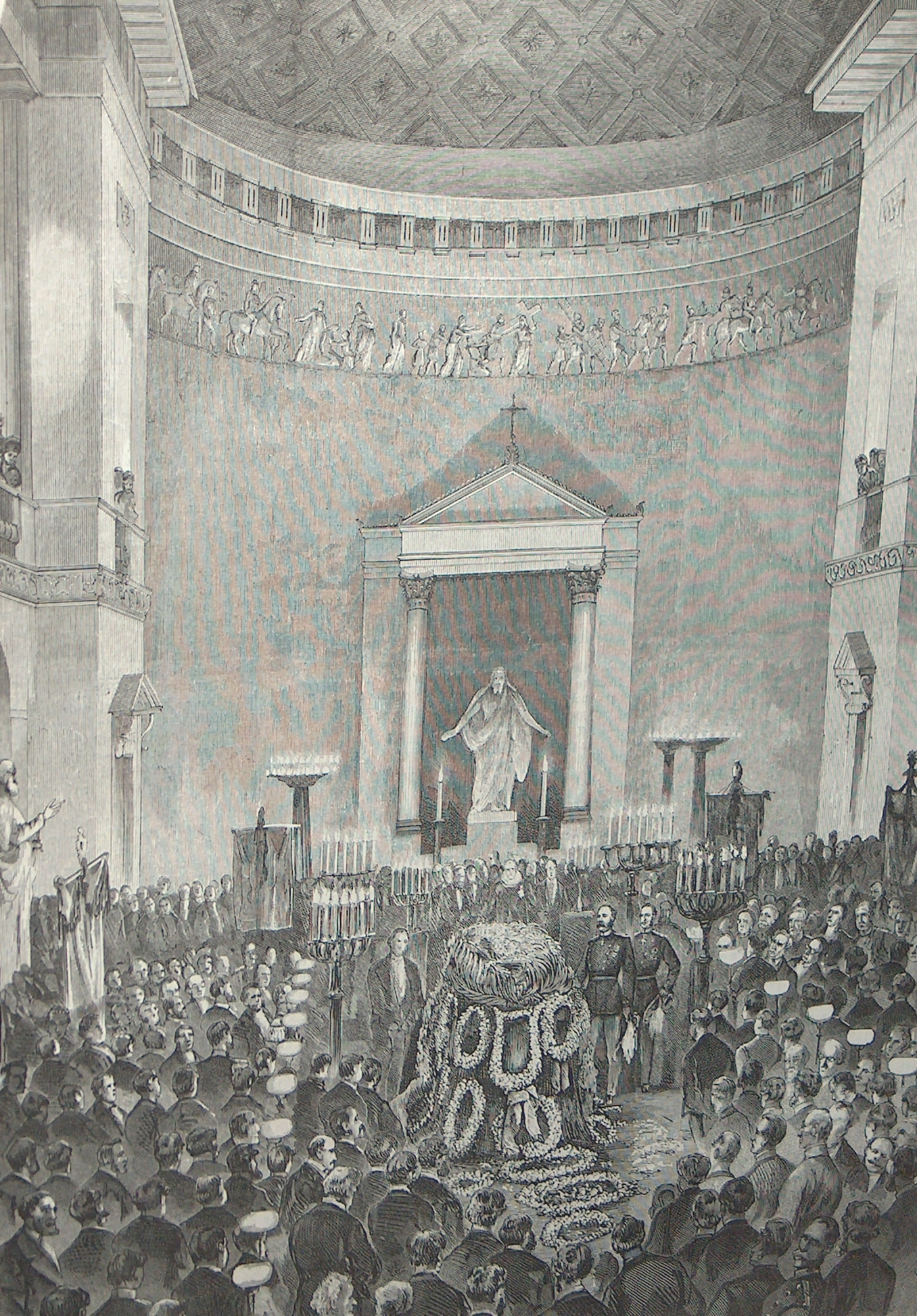
11 August: Hans Christian Andersen's funeral in Church of Our Lady in Copenhagen

February

- 25 February – The Seamen's Association of 1856's new building in Christianshavn is inaugurated.
- 1 January – the krone replaces the rigsdaler as the official currency of Denmark.

June

- 11 June – Prime Minister Christen Andreas Fonnesbech resigns, and is replaced by J. B. S. Estrup.

August

- 11 August – Hans Christian Andersen's funeral takes place in Church of Our Lady in Copenhagen.

=== Date unknown ===
- Aarhus Botanical Gardens is founded.
- Tegne- og Kunstindustriskolen, present-day Danmarks Designskole (Danish Design School), is founded.

== Births ==
=== January–March ===
- 3 February – Valdemar Andersen, illustrator and poster artist (died 1928)
- 17 February – Princess Louise, later Princess of Schaumburg-Lippe (died 1906)
- 22 February – Sigurd Wandel, painter (died 1847)
- 1 March – Herman Vedel, painter and portraitist (died 1948)
- 13 March – Axel Andersen Byrval, amateur football player and manager, national football team manager 1913–1915 and 1917–1918 (died 1957)

=== April–June ===
- 4 May – Marius Lefèrve, gymnast, Olympic silver medalist in team, Swedish system, in 1912 (died 1958)
- 19 May – Einar Hein, landscape painter associated with the "Skagen Painters" (died 1931)

=== July–September ===
- 27 September – Heinrich Dohm, painter of portraits, genre works and religious paintings (died 1940)

=== October–December ===
- 26 October – Hakon Andersen, organist and composer (died 1959)
- 8 December – Frederik Buch, film actor of the silent film era (died 1925)
- 10 December – Otto Scavenius, diplomat, Foreign Minister for one day during the Easter Crisis of 1920 (died 1945)
- 23 December – Marie-Sophie Nielsen, communist leader and founding member of the Danish Socialist Workers Party and the Communist Party of Denmark (died 1951)

== Deaths ==
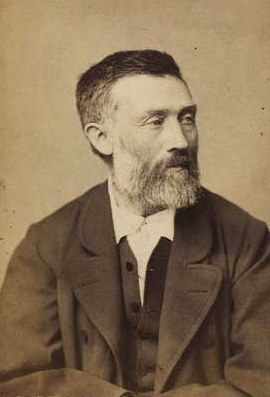
P. C. Skovgaard.

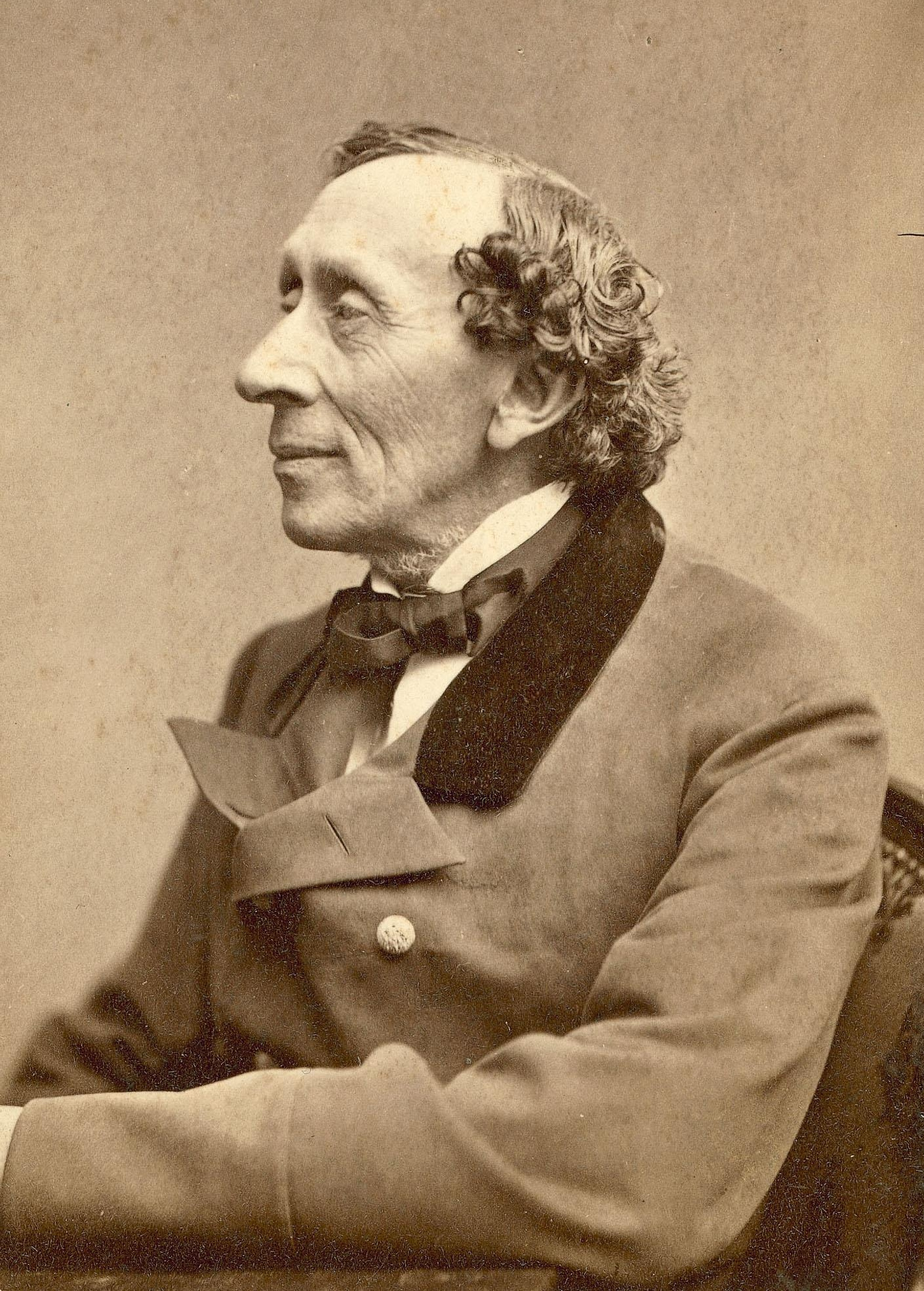
Hans Christian Andersen.

=== January–March ===
- 10 January – Anton Melbye, marine painter and daguerreotype photographer (born 1818)
- 13 January – Georg Hilker, decorative painter during the Danish Golden Age (born 1807)
- 6 February – Birgitte Andersen, stage actor and ballet dancer (born 1791)
- 9 February – Rasmus Carl Stæger, judge, financial advisor to the government, entomologist (born 1800)
- 15 March – Christian Julius Hansen, composer, organist, voice teacher and choirmaster (born 1814)

=== April–June ===
- 13 April – P. C. Skovgaard, national romantic landscape painter (born 1817)

=== July–September ===
- 4 August – Hans Christian Andersen, writer of plays, travelogues, novels, poems and fairy tales (born 1805)

=== October–December ===
- 11 December – Frederik Ferdinand Helsted, painter and drawing master (born 1809)
