= 1963 in Denmark =

- Decades: 1940s; 1950s; 1960s; 1970s; 1980s
- See also: Other events of 1963; List of years in Denmark

Events from the year 1963 in Denmark.

== Incumbents ==
- Monarch – Frederik IX
- Prime minister – Jens Otto Krag

== Events ==
=== Music ===
- March 23: The couple of Grethe and Jørgen Ingmann won the 8th edition of the Eurovision Song Contest with the song Dansevise, being the first victory for the country.

== Sports ==
=== Badminton ===
- 19–23 March – All England Badminton Championships
  - Erland Kops wins gold in Men's Singles
  - Finn Kobberø and Jørgen Hammergaard Hansen win gold in Men's Doubles
  - Finn Kobberø and Ulla Strand win gold medal in Mixed Doubles

=== Football ===
- 18 December – Denmark qualifies for the final tournament of the 1964 European Nations' Cup in France by defeating Luxemburg in the second round of the 1964 European Nations' Cup qualifying.

== Births ==
=== January–March ===
- 26 February – Jan Friis-Mikkelsen, chef and restaurateur
- 28 March – Morten Kirkskov, actor, theatre director and writer

=== April–June ===
- 7 April – Fredrik Lundin, jazz saxophonist
- 24 June – Jascha Richter, singer-songwriter, frontman of Michael Learns to Rock

=== July–September ===
- 4 July – Jan Mølby, football player, football coach
- 15 July – Brigitte Nielsen, actress, model, and singer
- 25 September – Peter Have, politician

=== October–December ===
- 3 October – Niels Lan Doky, jazz pianist, record producer
- 13 October – Henrik Qvortrup, journalist
- 18 November – Peter Schmeichel, footballer
- 6 December – Ulrich Thomsen, Danish actor and producer
- 26 December – Lars Ulrich, drummer, co-founder of Metallica
- 27 December – Claus Meyer, restaurateur, culinary entrepreneur, cookbook writer

== Deaths ==
=== January–March ===
- 20 February – Jacob Gade, violinist and composer (born 1879)

=== April–June ===
- 14 April – Anna Borg, Danish-Icelandic actress (born 1903)
- 9 May – Johannes Berggreen, businessman (died 1878)
- 5 June – Henrik Kauffmann, diplomat (born 1999 in Germany)
- 3 July – Povl Baumann, architect (born 1878)

=== Kily–September ===
- 5 July – Aagot Lading, educator (born 1909)
- 8 Aigist – Karl Kristian Steincke, politician (born 1880)

== See also ==
- 1963 in Danish television
