= 1963 in Danish television =

This is a list of Danish television related events from 1963.

== Events ==
- 24 February – Grethe & Jørgen Ingmann are selected to represent Denmark at the 1963 Eurovision Song Contest with their song "Dansevise". They are selected to be the seventh Danish Eurovision entry during Dansk Melodi Grand Prix held at the Tivolis Koncertsal in Copenhagen.
- 23 March – Denmark wins the 8th Eurovision Song Contest in London, United Kingdom. The winning song is "Dansevise", performed by Grethe & Jørgen Ingmann.

== Births ==
- 2 August – Hans Pilgaard, journalist & TV host
- 28 August – Peter Mygind, actor & TV host
- 24 October – Søren Fauli, actor & director
- 19 November – Klaus Bondam, actor & politician
- 27 November – Thomas Bo Larsen, actor

== See also ==
- 1963 in Denmark
