= Gunnar Aaby =

Danish footballer (1895–1966)

Personal information
- Full name: Gunnar Nielsen Aaby
- Date of birth: 9 July 1895
- Place of birth: Frederiksberg, Denmark
- Date of death: 22 August 1966 (aged 71)
- Place of death: Gribskov, Hovedstaden, Denmark
- Position: Forward

Youth career
- –1912: Akademisk Boldklub U19

Senior career*
Years	Team	Apps	(Gls)
1912–1929	Akademisk Boldklub		
- * Club domestic league appearances and goals

Gunnar Nielsen Aaby (9 July 1895 – 22 August 1966) was a Danish soccer player in the 1920s.

At the 1920 Men's Olympic football tournament, his team lost to the Spanish team.
