= 1909 in Denmark =

- Decades: 1880s; 1890s; 1900s; 1910s; 1920s
- See also: Other events of 1909; List of years in Denmark

The following lists events that happened during 1909 in the Kingdom of Denmark.

== Incumbents ==
- Monarch – Frederick VIII
- Prime minister – Niels Neergaard (until 16 August), Ludvig Holstein-Ledreborg (until 28 October), Carl Theodor Zahle

== Events ==
- 20 April – Women are given the right to vote in municipal elections. General women's suffrage is not introduced in Denmark until 1915.

== Sports ==
- 9 June – Skovshoved IF is founded.

=== Cycling ===
- 14–23 August – The 1909 UCI Track Cycling World Championships are held in Copenhagen.

== Births ==
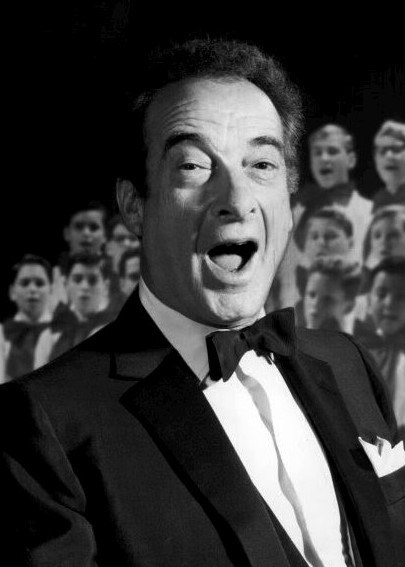
Victor Borge.

=== January–March ===
- 3 January – Victor Borge, Danish-American comedian, conductor and pianist (d. 2000)
- 7 February – Wilhelm Freddie, Danish painter (d. 1995)
- 22 February – Vermund Larsen, businessman, company founder (died 1970)

=== April–June ===
- 19 April – Signe Rink, writer and enothologist (born 1836)
- 9 May – Hilde Levi, physicist (died 2003)
- 25 June – Marguerite Viby, actress (died 2001)

=== July–September ===
- 5 July – Aagot Lading, educator (died 1963)

=== October–December ===
- 20 August – Martin A. Hansen, writer (died 1955)
- 20 December – Vagn Holmboe, composer (died 1996)

== Deaths ==
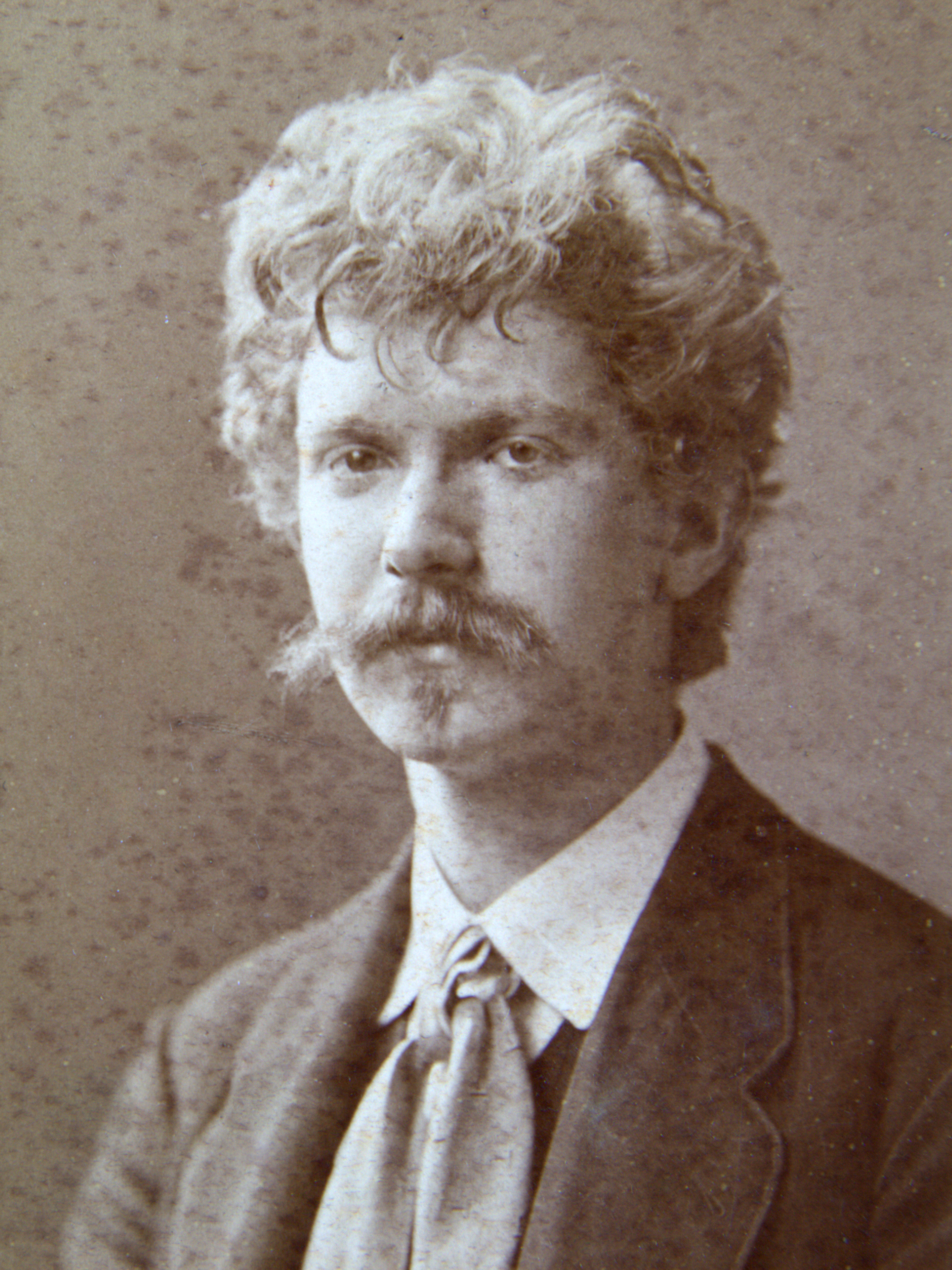
Peder Severin Krøyer.

=== January–March ===
- 13 February
  - Hugo Egmont Hørring, politician, prime minister of Denmark (born 1842)
  - Hans Peter Jørgen Julius Thomsen, lawyer (born 1826)

=== April–June ===
- 7 May – Joachim Andersen, flutist, conductor and composer (born 1847)

=== July–September ===
- 9 July – Johannes Forchhammer, philologist (born 1827)
- 19 July – Leopold Rosenfeld, composer (born 1849)
- 27 August – Emil Christian Hansen, chemist (born 1842)
- 25 September – Thomas Skat Rørdam, theologian and bishop (born 1832)

=== October–December ===
- 13 October – Janus la Cour, painter (born 1837)
- 21 November – Peder Severin Krøyer, Norwegian-born painter (b. 1851)
- 4 December – Princess Marie of Orléans, wife of Prince Valdemar (born 1865 in London)
- 29/30 December – Carl Emil Krarup, telegraph engineer, mainly known for the invention of the Krarup cable, a kind of loaded cable (born 1872)
