= Dick Nelson =

Danish boxer

Bust of Dick Nelson by Kai Nielsen.

Dick Nelson (née Richard Christensen, 4 September 1880 – 4 June 1922) was a Danish professional boxer. He was included in the Danish Professional Boxing Federation's Hall of Fame in 2014.

== Biography ==
Dick Nelson was born as Richard Christensen on 4 September 1880 in the Frederiksberg district of Copenhagen. He joined the boxing club Olympia at the age of 14 but later changed to Hermod. He was trained by Jim Smith. He became a Danish amateur lightweight champion in 1901, 1902 and 1904.

In 1905, he had his debut as a professional boxer in a match against George Dixon. His professional career took him to the United States, Germany and England. He took the name Dick Nelson when he moved to New York City in 1906. In 1911 he was back in Denmark, defeating obby Dobbs. After a few more matches in the United States, he returned to Europe. He boxed against Waldemar Holberg four times. One of these matches, which was won by Nelson on knock out in the 15th round, was for the Scandinavian Welter weight championship. He boxed his last professional match in Aarhus on 6 November 1921 against Emil Christensen. The match was won by Nelson on knock out in the 11th round. He died less than a year later. The newspapers wrte that he died from a stoke in his home. In his book De glemte helte (2003), the real reason may have been suivice. For some years, he had been struggling with depression. He was buried at Copenhagen's Western Cemetery. His coffin was followed by 30,000 people.

== Legacy ==
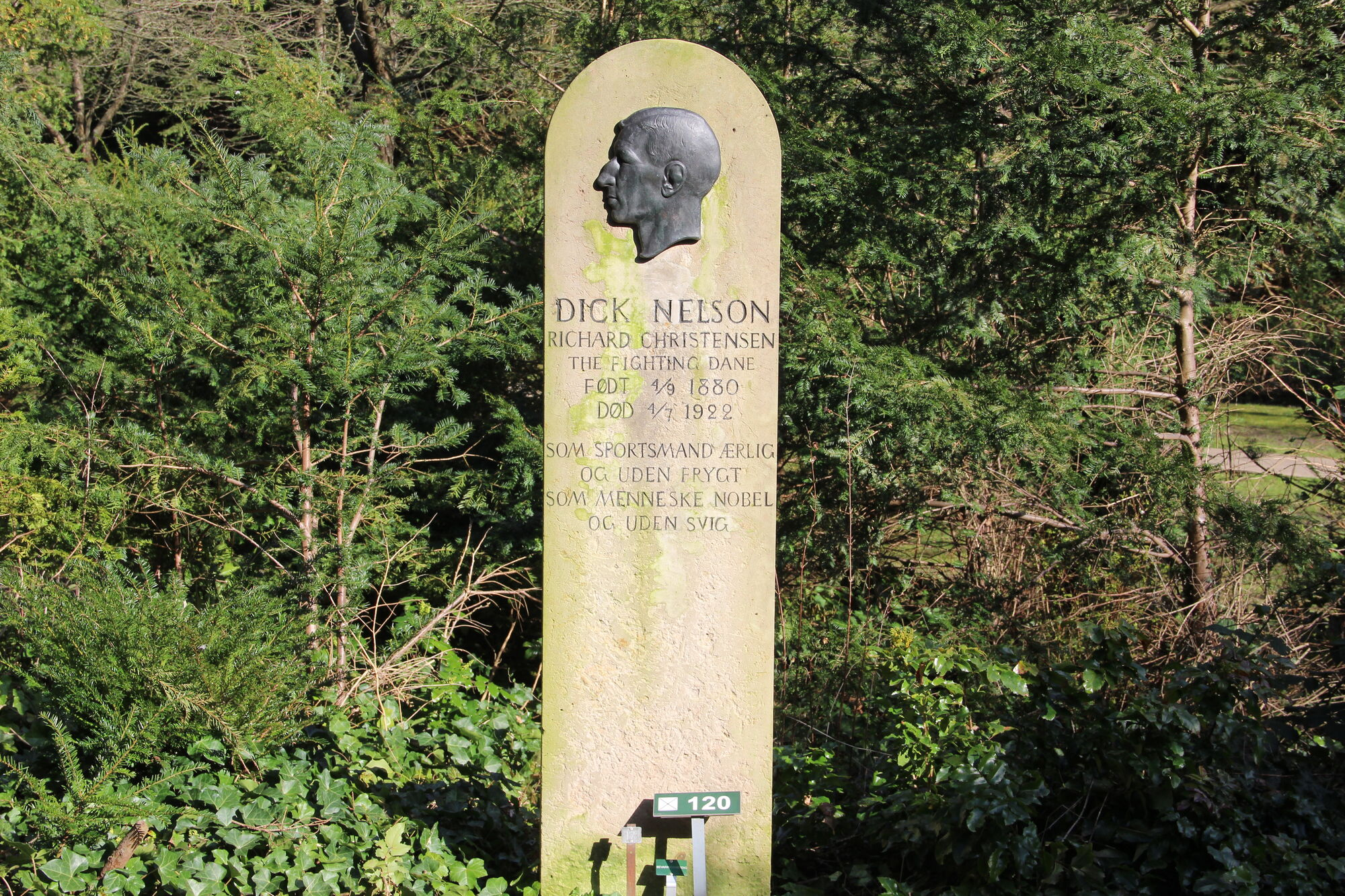
Nelson's tombstone at Copenhagen's Western Cemetery.

In 1920, he published his memoirs entitled Mit liv og mine kampe – tyve aar i ringen. In the same year, he also published the book Et kursus i boksning.

The sculptor Kai Nielsen created a bust of him. It is now in the collection of the National Gallery of Denmark. At Dick Nelson death, his wife could not afford a tombstone. In 1924, however, a public collection raised enough money to erect a stone for Nelson on his grave at Vestre Kirkegård. A similar stone was erected for his teacher Jim Smith on the same occasion. The stone feature a portrait relief of him.

In 2014, he was included in the Professional Danish Professional Boxing Federation' Hall of Fame.
