= Hanna Adler =

Danish school principal and physicist

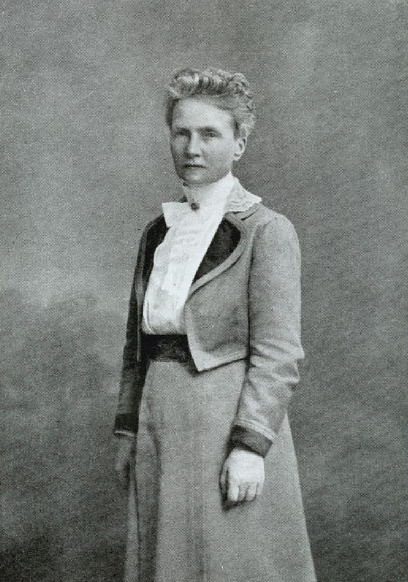
Hanna Adler photographed by Julie Laurberg (1911)

Hanna Adler (28 May 1859 – 4 January 1947) was a Danish physicist and school principal. One of the first Danish women to graduate in physics, she is remembered for founding and running Denmark's first mixed school in September 1893, years before other mixed schools were established. She proved to be an excellent headmistress, caring for each of her pupils and inspiring them to follow her principle of tolerance irrespective of race or religion. This led not only to educational success but to a free and easy atmosphere between teachers and pupils and between the pupils among themselves. Adler served as principal until her retirement in 1929, running a school which offered education from the first grade up to the highest gymnasium level leading to university entrance.

== Early life, family and education ==
Born in Copenhagen on 28 May 1859, Hanna Adler was the daughter of the Jewish banker and politician David Baruch Adler (1826–1878) and his English wife Jenny née Raphael who also came from a banking family. Hanna was the fifth of the family's six children. After being privately tutored, Adler passed the matriculation examination in 1885 and went on to study physics at the University of Copenhagen. She earned a master's degree in 1892. Together with Kirstine Meyer, she was one of the first Danish women to graduate in physics. Hanna Adler was the maternal aunt of the physicist Niels Bohr.

On graduating, she travelled to the United States where she spent several months investigating the success of the mixed schools which had been established there. While she was impressed with the way in which the democratic approach helped to develop the children's confidence and self-esteem, she was more critical of the amount of knowledge they acquired. On her return to Denmark, in a speech she presented to the Pedagogical Association she explained how single sex schools lacked the constructive exchanges of views between pupils considered to be so important in America while mixed schools could avoid the intellectual training enjoyed by boys and the learning by heart practiced in girls schools.

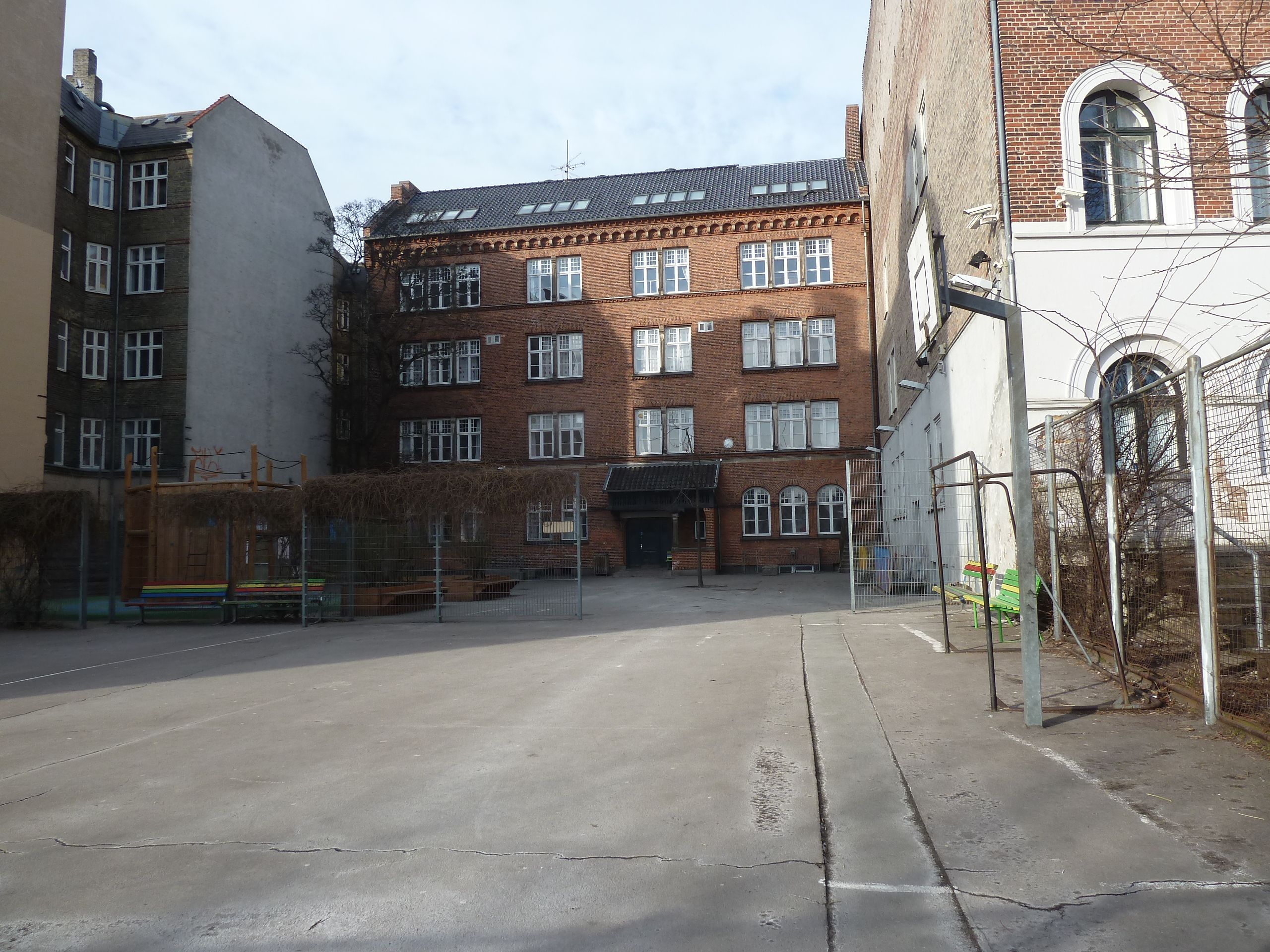
Sortedam Gymnasium (2012)

== Career ==
In September 1893, she realized her convictions by creating her own school on Sortedam Dossering, a lakeside street in central Copenhagen. Known as H. Adlers Fællerskole (H. Adlers Mixed School), it admitted boys and girls who would be educated and treated on equal terms. Over the next few years, the school developed to cover all classes up to school-leaving age. Boys and girls followed the same courses, including gymnastics and needlework in addition to normal academic subjects. Adler believed the school should remain small enough so that she could develop close relationships with every pupil. Her approach ran up against strong criticism from those in traditional schools but Adler remained steadfast in her ambitions. When private schools were acquired by the state in 1918, Adler donated her school on condition it would continue to operate for all classes up to matriculation. She remained principal at the school, now known as "Sortedam Gymnasium H. Adlers Fællesskole" until her retirement in 1929.

During the German occupation of Denmark, as a Jew Adler was interned at the Horserød Camp but was released after 400 of her former pupils complained to the authorities.

Hanna Adler died in Copenhagen on 4 January 1947 and was buried in the city's Mosaisk Nordre Begravelsesplads.
