= Esben Sloth Andersen =

Danish professor

Esben Sloth Andersen (10 August 1947) is an emeritus professor in economics at Aalborg University.

Esben Sloth Andersen's research revolves around evolutionary economics with emphasis on innovation and its role in economic growth. Furthermore, he has worked with computer simulation and history of theory. Within this field, Esben Sloth Andersen was awarded the “Gunnar Myrdal prize” in 2010 by the European Association for Evolutionary Political Economy.

== Education ==
Esben Sloth Andersen graduated from University of Copenhagen in 1986 and received his PhD in 1994 from Roskilde University. In 2010, Esben Sloth Andersen received his doctorate based on his doctoral thesis "Schumpeter's Evolutionary Economics: A Theoretical, Historical and Statistical Analysis of the Engine of Capitalism".
