= Harald Hansen (painter) =

Danish painter

- Born: 18 February 1890; Copenhagen, Denmark
- Died: 30 June 1967 (aged 77); Copenhagen, Denmark
- Occupation: Painter

Harald Hansen (18 February 1890 – 30 June 1967) was a Danish painter. His work was part of the painting event in the art competition at the 1932 Summer Olympics.
