= Peter Gemzøe =

Danish painter and lithographer (1811–1879)

Peter Henrik Gemzøe
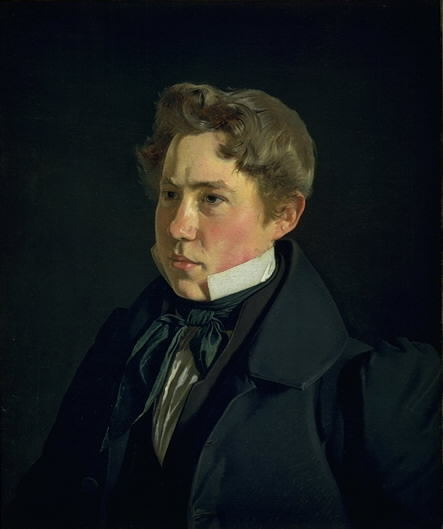
- Christen Købke: Portrait of the Painter and Lithographer P. H. Gemzøe, 1833
- Born: 6 February 1811; Copenhagen, Denmark
- Died: 3 October 1879 (aged 68); Copenhagen, Denmark
- Resting place: Assistens Cemetery
- Education: Royal Danish Academy of Fine Arts
- Known for: Painting
- Movement: Danish Golden Age

Peter Henrik Gemzøe (6 February 1811 – 3 October 1879) was a Danish painter and lithographer.

== Early life and education ==
Gemzøe was born on 6 February 1811, in Copenhagen, to copyist in the Treasury Carl Henrik Peter Gemzøe (1778–1840) and Andriette Frederikke Opitius (c. 1778 – 1830). He was endorsed to pursuit his talent for drawing by Wilhelm Bendz and was admitted to the Royal Danish Academy of Fine Arts in 1829 while in the same time studying privately under Christoffer Wilhelm Eckersberg. He qualified for the academy's Model School in 1832.

He belonged to Christen Købke's social circle and in 1832 created a number of lithographies based on Købke's portraits of N. L. Feilberg and F. C. Sibbern. In the late 1830s, he gave up painting altogether to completely focus on lithography. He spent four years in Munich from 1840 where he studied under Hohe and Kohler.

== Career ==
Gemzøe worked for Det kgl. stentrykkeri until 1837 and then for E. Bærentzen & Co. from 1837 to 1840 and again from 1844 and he also worked for Tegner & Kittendorff. He specialized in portraits but he also created reproductions of many of Wilhelm Marstrand's paintings of scenes from Ludvig Holberg's plays and of popular works by Julius Exner, Carl Bloch and other artists of the time. He exhibited at Charlottenborg in 1833 and 1835.

== Personal life ==
Gemzøe did not marry. He committed suicide, on 3 October 1879, aged 69, in Copenhagen, and is buried in Assistens Cemetery.
