= List of extreme temperatures in Denmark =

Denmark is a Scandinavian country in Europe located on the 56th parallel north. Denmark is located at a zone where air masses from a diverse range of regions congregate, giving it its temperate climate. Denmark's average temperature is 7.7 °C.

== Highest and lowest temperatures ever recorded in Denmark ==
Top 10 highest temperatures
Rank	Temperature	Location	Date recorded
1.	37.0 °C	Hans Christian Andersen Airport	27 June 2026
2.	36.7 °C	Ødum	27 June 2026
3.	36.4 °C	Holstebro	10 August 1975
4.	35.9 °C	Abed, Lolland	20 July 2022
5.	35.9 °C	Odense	25 June 2006
6.	35.8 °C	Slagelse	13 August 1911
7.	35.5 °C	Hillerød	29 June 1947
8.	35.0 °C	Flintholm Gods	3 July 1883
9.	34.7 °C	Viborg	3 July 2009
10.	34.6 °C	Roskilde	8 June 1889

Top 10 lowest temperatures
Rank	Temperature	Location	Date recorded
1.	−31.2 °C	Hørsted	8 January 1982
2.	−31.0 °C	Løndal	26 January 1942
3.	−30.3 °C	Hald Ege (near Viborg)	29 January 1941
4.	−29.6 °C	Søndersted (near Holbæk)	18 January 1893
5.	−29.0 °C	Brande	8 February 1942
6.	−28.5 °C	Brønderslev	30 January 1947
7.	−28.1 °C	Ulstrup	14 February 1956
8.	−27.8 °C	Skovgårde (near Vordingborg)	17 January 1893
9.	−27.6 °C	Gurre (near Helsingør)	25 February 1947
10.	−27.4 °C	Kibæk	13 February 1940

== Highest and lowest temperatures recorded in Denmark each year, 1990–2023 ==
Year	Highest (summer)			Lowest (winter)		
Year	Temp.	Date	Location	Temp.	Date	Location
1990	33.1 °C	5 August	Fredericia	-8.8 °C	6 December	Agerkrog
1991	27.6 °C	12 July	Copenhagen	-21.4 °C	9 February	Randers
1992	35.1 °C	10 August	Klemensker	-14.2 °C	30 December	Mariager
1993	28.8 °C	10 June	Faaborg	-11.1 °C	25 November	Vordingborg
1994	32.6 °C	24 July	Blåvandshuk	-17.4 °C	21 February	Frederikshavn
1995	31.8 °C	10 July	Engelstrup	-16.8 °C	30 December	Kås
1996	32.9 °C	21 August	Rønne	-17.6 °C	10 February	Skive
1997	32.9 °C	25 August	Åbenrå	-20.8 °C	2 January	Aalborg
1998	32.0 °C	8 August	Møn	-16.8 °C	4 February	Hjørring
1999	30.6 °C	12 September	Rømø	-14.9 °C	14 February	Grenå
2000	32.4 °C	21 June	Copenhagen	-16.0 °C	24 January	Karup
2001	31.2 °C	15 August	Allinge-Sandvig	-19.0 °C	30 December	Roskilde
2002	32.2 °C	30 July	Sønderborg	-18.4 °C	1 January	Lemvig
2003	33.4 °C	8 August	Karup	-21.5 °C	7 January	Hjørring
2004	32.2 °C	10 August	Aalborg	-16.0 °C	30 January	Thisted
2005	33.0 °C	21 June	Copenhagen	-20.2 °C	4 March	Copenhagen
2006	35.9 °C	25 June	Odense	-21.0 °C	29 January	Randers
2007	31.4 °C	11 June	Karup	-15.0 °C	21 December	Frederikshavn
2008	31.0 °C	29 July	Esbjerg	-9.5 °C	23 March	Karup
2009	34.7 °C	3 July	Viborg	-20.1 °C	19 December	Viborg
2010	34.1 °C	11 July	Hammer Odde	-23.0 °C	22 December	Holbæk
2011	28.2 °C	6 June	Rønne	-16.5 °C	21 February	Aalborg
2012	32.9 °C	20 August	Odense	-23.1 °C	5 February	Odense
2013	33.3 °C	3 August	Karup	-20.6 °C	16 January	Silkeborg
2014	33.2 °C	10 July	Aalborg	-15.3 °C	29 December	Roskilde
2015	32.3 °C	5 July	Holstebro	-11.5 °C	6 February	Herning
2016	32.0 °C	24 June	Copenhagen	-15.5 °C	21 January	Copenhagen
2017	26.8 °C	27 May	Holstebro	-14.1 °C	16 January	Isenvad
2018	33.6 °C	27 July	Vejle	-13.5 °C	2 March	Holstebro
2019	32.8 °C	24 July	Billund	-9.9 °C	24 January	Frederiksberg
2020	32.4 °C	9 August	Frederiksberg	-8.2 °C	25 December	Horsens
2021	34.0 °C	20 June	Rønne	-20.7 °C	13 February	Randers
2022	35.9 °C	20 July	Abed, Lolland	-18.0 °C	16 December	Isenvad
2023	32.1 °C	15 July	Abed, Lolland	-15.3 °C	8 March	Hjørring

== Highest and lowest temperatures of every month ==
This list consists of the highest and lowest temperature of every month.

January:

- 12.6 °C, 1 January 2023, Abed, Lolland
- -31.2 °C, 8 January 1982, Thisted

February:

- 15.8 °C, 24 February 1990, Copenhagen & 26 February 2019, Aarhus
- -29.0 °C, 8 February 1942, Brande

March:

- 22.2 °C, 18 March 1990, Karup
- -27.0 °C, 6 March 1888, Holbæk

April:

- 28.6 °C, 27 April 1993, Holbæk
- -19.0 °C, 3 April 1922, Brønderslev

May:

- 32.8 °C, 21 May 1888 Holbæk
- -8.0 °C, 14 May 1900, Silkeborg

June:

- 36.7 °C, 27 June 2026, Ødum
- -3.5 °C, 2 June 1936, Klosterhede Plantage

July:

- 35.9 °C, 20 July 2022, Abed, Lolland
- -0.9 °C, 16 July 1903, Silkeborg

August:

- 36.4 °C, 10 August 1975, Holstebro
- -2.0 °C, 29 August 1885, Varde

September:

- 32.4 °C, 2 September 1906, Randers
- -5.6 °C, 25 September 1886, Aalborg

October:

- 26.9 °C, 1 October 2011, Åbenrå
- -11.9 °C, 30 October 1880, Torstedlund

November:

- 18.5 °C, 21 November 2009, Præstø
- -21.4 °C, 30 November 1973, Ringkøbing

December:

- 14.5 °C, 5 December 1953, Nordby, Fanø
- -25.6 °C, 17 December 1981, Døvling

== Highest & lowest temperature of every month in Copenhagen ==
January:

- 11.2 °C, 1 January 2022
- -27.6 °C, 26 January 1942

February:

- 15.8 °C, 24 February 1990
- -25.5 °C, 21 February 1963

March:

- 20.8 °C, 30 March 1968
- -21.0 °C, 6 March 1888

April:

- 28.0 °C, 27 April 1993
- -16.5 °C, 3 April 1922

May:

- 32.4 °C, 26 May 1892
- -6.6 °C, 14 May 1900

June:

- 34.8 °C, 25 June 2006
- 0.4 °C, 2 June 1936

July:

- 35.6 °C, 20 July 2022
- 0.1 °C, 17 July 1903

August:

- 34.8 °C, 10 August 1975
- 0.0 °C, 29 August 1885

September:

- 32.4 °C, 6 September 1949
- -2.5 °C, 25 September 1886

October:

- 24.4 °C, 1 October 2011
- -8.8 °C, 30 October 1880

November:

- 17.2 °C, 2 November 2020
- -18.4 °C, 30 November 1973

December:

- 12.1 °C, 5 December 2006
- -22.9 °C, 17 December 1981

== Records in the 21st century ==
Weather feature	Record	Location	Date
Highest temperature	37.0 °C	Ødum	27 June 2026
Lowest temperature	-23.1 °C	Odense	5 February 2012
Fastest wind gust	194.4 km/h	Sønderborg	28 October 2013
Highest precipitation amount	135.4 mm	Greater Copenhagen	2 July 2011

On 20 July 2022, Copenhagen measured its highest recorded temperature, 35.6 °C.

In the 21st century, Denmark experienced its mildest winter, warmest spring, warmest summer and mildest autumn on record:

- Mildest winter: 2020
- Warmest spring: 2007
- Warmest summer: 2018
- Mildest autumn: 2006

== Highest and lowest temperatures of every year in Copenhagen, 2000–2022 ==
Highest temperatures
Year	Temperature (°C)	Date
2000	32.4	21 June
2001	30.4	15 August
2002	30.9	30 July
2003	31.6	8 August
2004	30.8	10 August
2005	33.0	21 June
2006	34.9	25 June
2007	30.6	11 June
2008	30.2	26 July
2009	32.7	3 July
2010	33.0	10 July
2011	30.0	2 July
2012	31.2	20 August
2013	30.6	3 August
2014	32.6	10 July
2015	30.6	5 July
2016	32.0	24 June
2017	26.6	27 May
2018	33.0	27 July
2019	32.0	24 July
2020	31.8	10 August
2021	32.1	15 July
2022	35.6	20 July

Lowest temperatures
Year	Temperature (°C)	Date
2000	-10.8	24 January
2001	-18.8	31 December
2002	-12.8	1 January
2003	-20.0	7 January
2004	-11.0	21 December
2005	-20.2	4 March
2006	-15.5	29 January
2007	-12.6	24 January
2008	-6.6	23 March
2009	-14.7	19 December
2010	-20.4	22 December
2011	-14.6	21 February
2012	-21.6	4 February
2013	-16.0	16 January
2014	-12.7	29 December
2015	-7.0	25 January
2016	-15.5	21 January
2017	-11.6	16 January
2018	-10.6	2 March
2019	-8.8	24 January
2020	-6.8	25 December
2021	-19.5	13 February
2022	-14.4	16 December

== Warmest years in Denmark ==
Denmark's average temperature is 7.7 °C

Year	Average temperature (°C)
2020	9.0
2022	8.8
2014	8.7
2018	8.6
2019	8.4
2007	8.4
2000	8.2
1990	8.2
1975	8.1
1999	8.1

== Highest wind gusts ==
Wind gust (km/h)	Date	Location
194 (54 m/s)	28 October 2013	Sønderborg
190 (53 m/s)	3 December 1999	Frederikshavn
186 (52 m/s)	26 January 1990	Blåvandshuk
186 (52 m/s)	6 December 2013	Anholt (Denmark)
185 (51 m/s)	31 December 1921	Anholt (Denmark)
184 (51 m/s)	3 January 1976	Hvide Sande
182 (50 m/s)	4 January 2012	Anholt (Denmark)
181 (50 m/s)	3 January 2012	Hvide Sande & Thyborøn
180 (50 m/s)	1 March 2008	Hvide Sande
176 (49 m/s)	29 November 2015	Thyborøn

== Precipitation extremes ==
Precipitation sum	Date	Location
135.4 mm	2 July 2011	Copenhagen
118.0 mm	14 August 2010	Copenhagen
116.8 mm	2 June 2008	Frøslevlejren
110.2 mm	24 June 2012	Hvide Sande
99.6 mm	8 November 2001	Thyborøn

== Month records ==
January

- Mildest: 2020
- Coldest: 1942
- Wettest: 2023
- Driest: 1996 & 1997
- Windiest: 2012
- Sunniest: 1963

February

- Mildest: 1990
- Coldest: 1947
- Wettest: 1988
- Driest: 1932
- Windiest: 2022, 2020 & 1990
- Sunniest: 1932

March

- Mildest: 1990 & 2007
- Coldest: 1942
- Wettest: 2019
- Driest: 2022
- Windiest: 2021
- Sunniest: 2022

April

- Warmest: 2011
- Coldest: 1888
- Wettest: 1936
- Driest: 1974
- Windiest: 1994
- Sunniest: 2019

May

- Warmest: 2018
- Coldest: 1902
- Wettest: 1983
- Driest: 1959
- Windiest: 2021
- Sunniest: 2018

June

- Warmest: 1889
- Mildest: 1923
- Wettest: 2016
- Driest: 1976
- Windiest: 1931
- Sunniest: 1888

July

- Warmest: 2006
- Mildest: 1979
- Wettest: 2023
- Driest: 2006
- Windiest: 1885
- Sunniest: 2018

August

- Warmest: 1997
- Mildest: 1902
- Wettest: 2006
- Driest: 1947
- Windiest: 2006
- Sunniest: 1947

September

- Warmest: 1999, 2006 & 2016
- Mildest: 1877
- Wettest: 1994
- Driest: 2006
- Windiest: 2015
- Sunniest: 2006

October

- Warmest: 2006
- Coldest: 1905
- Wettest: 1967
- Driest: 2005
- Windiest: 2013
- Sunniest: 2005

November

- Mildest: 2006
- Coldest: 1919
- Wettest: 1969
- Driest: 1902
- Windiest: 2009
- Sunniest: 1989

December

- Mildest: 2006
- Coldest: 1981
- Wettest: 1985
- Driest: 1890
- Windiest: 2013
- Sunniest: 2010
