= David B. Adler =

David Baruch Adler
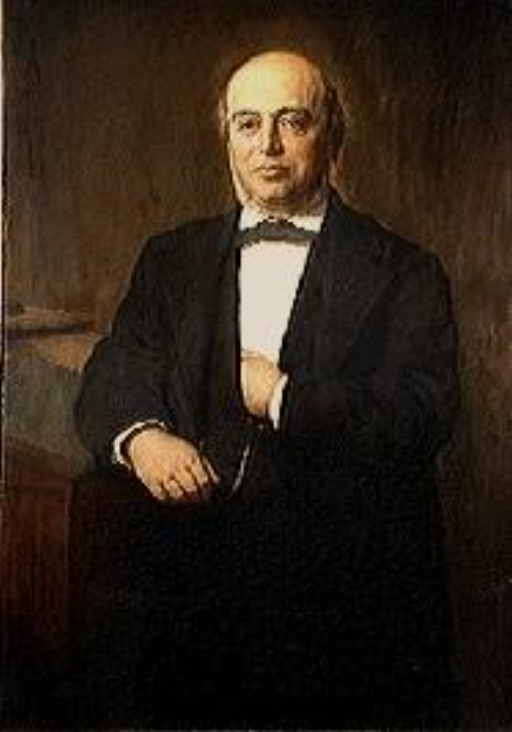
- David B. Adler painted by August Jerndorff in 1900
- Born: 16 May 1826; Copenhagen, Denmark
- Died: 4 December 1878 (aged 52); Copenhagen, Denmark
- Occupation: Businessman
- Awards: Order of the Dannebrog

David Baruch Adler (16 May 1826 – 4 December 1878) was a Jewish-Danish banker, politician and philanthropist. He founded Kjøbenhavns Handelsbank in 1875.

== Early life and education ==
Adler was born on 16 May 1826 in Copenhagen, the son of broker Baruch Isak Adler (1789–1843) and Hanne Meyer (1792–1842). He attended Mariboes Realskole before moving to Hamburg at the age of 16 where he received a commercial education as a textile merchant.

== Career ==
After four years in Hamburg, Adler continued to London where, in 1848, an inheritance of about 30,000 rigsdaler enabled him to become a partner in the commission house Martin Levin & Adler.

In 1850 he returned to Copenhagen. He founded the banking house of D. B. Adler & Co. on 22 February 1850. Martin Levin was a silent partner in the company, just as Adler remained a silent partner in the London enterprise for a few more years.

Together with Tietgen he was a driving force behind the foundation of Privatbanken in 1868. He was a member of its governing board until disagreements with Tietgen made him resign in 1876.

On 18 April 1875, after years of preparations in secrecy, Adler founded Kjøbenhavns Handelsbank. The board of directors consisted of national bank directors W. Sponneck and A.E. Reimann as well as state loans director Martin Levy. Adler was later also a co-founder of several credit and banking houses in Jutland, including Nye Jyske Købstadskreditforening (1871) on the basis of the firm Adler, Wulff & Meyer in Aarhus Jysk Handels- og Landbrugsbank (1876).

Adler was a member of the Maritime and Commercial Court from 1862 to 1877. He was a member of Grosserer-Societetet's governing committee from 1875 to 1878. He was also a member of several legislative commissions and exhibition committees. He was a member of the Mosaic (Jewish) community's board of representatives from 1870 to 1877.

== Politics ==
Adler was a member of the Copenhagen City Council from 1858 to 1864. He was a member of Folketinget in 1869–1872 and again in 1864–1869, and of Landstinget as a substitute for Moritz G. Melchior in 1874–1878. He belonged to the National Liberal Party and had close ties to politicians such as Carl Christian Hall, Carl Steen Andersen Bille and Christian Sophus Klein.

== Personal life ==
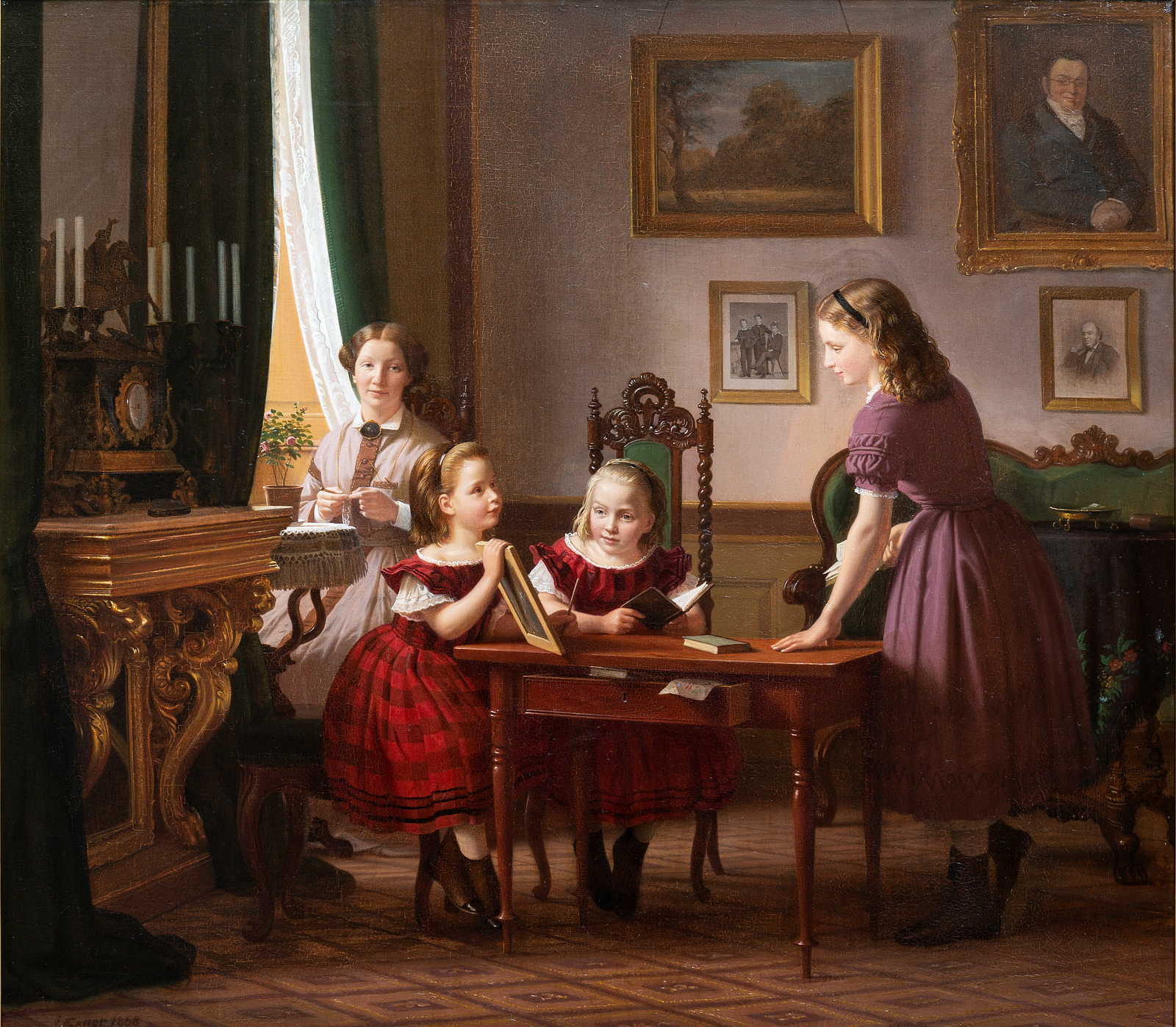
Julius Exner: Jenny Raphael Adler with her daughters Ellen, Hanna and Emma, 1868

On 19 December 1849, Adler married Jenny Raphael (11 March 1830 – 13 November 1902) in London. She was a daughter of banker John Raphael (1802–1877) and Emma Schiff (1803–1844). The couple had six children. Their eldest son, Bertil Adler, took on the family firm after his father's death. Their second youngest daughter, Hanna Adler, founded the predecessor of Sortedam School. Their youngest daughter, Ellen Adler, married Christian Bohr and was the mother of Niels Bohr and Harald Bohr.

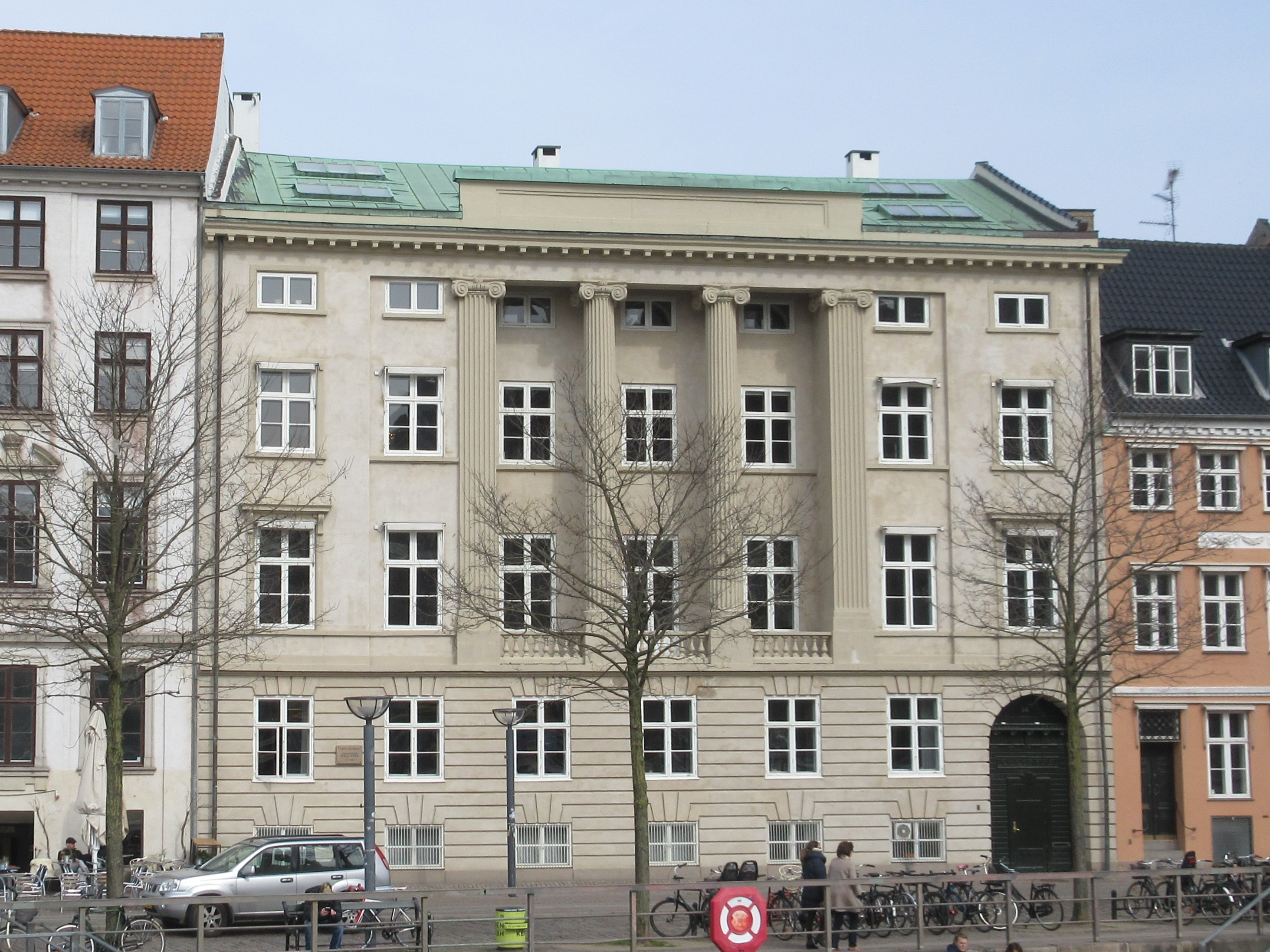
Adler's former home at Ved Stranden 12 in Copenhagen

Adler resided in the Gustmeyer House at Ved Stranden 12 in Copenhagen. He was also the owner of the country house Nærumgård in Nærum north of the city. He and his wife turned Nærumgård into an orphanage in their will.

Adler died on 4 December 1878 and is buried in the Jewish Northern Cemetery. Their mansion in Copenhagen was taken over by Christian and Ellen Bohr.
