= Jan Petersen (medallist) =

Danish medallist, draftsman and graphic artist (born 1945)

Jan Petersen (born 19 November 1945) is a Danish medallist, draftsman and graphic artist. He served as chief medallist for the Royal Danish Mint from 1875 to 1987.

== Biography ==
Petersen was trained as a printer under Harald Leth and 1980–85 at the School of Applied Arts.

Petersen was chief medalist at the Royal Mint from 1985, until the position was discontinued in 1997. He renewed the portrait of Margrethe II on the Danish 20 and 10 krone coins. (1994). He has also created stylistically varied depictions of Margrethe II for the jubilee coins from 1990, 1992, 1995 and 1997. Other works as a medallist include the Technical University of Denmark's honorary medal (1998).
