= 1943 in Denmark =

- Decades: 1920s; 1930s; 1940s; 1950s; 1960s
- See also: Other events of 1943; List of years in Denmark

Events from the year 1943 in Denmark.

== Incumbents ==
- Monarch – Christian X
- Prime minister – Erik Scavenius (until 29 September), German military rule

== Events ==
- 29 April – Some 100 prominent Danes are taken hostage by the occupying German forces in the attempt to stop sabotage by the Danish resistance movement.
- 30 May – Queen Alexandrine Bridge between Zealand and Møn is inaugurated.
- 29 August – The Danish government resigns, leading to direct administration of Denmark by German authority.
- 28 September – Georg Ferdinand Duckwitz, a German diplomat, after secretly making sure Sweden would receive Jewish refugees, leaks word of the German plans for the arrest and deportation of the some 8,000 Danish Jews to Hans Hedtoft, chairman of the Danish Social Democratic Party. The result is the rescue of the Danish Jews, with most of the country's Jews escaping to Sweden.

== Sports ==
- AB wins their fourth Danish football championship by winning the 1942–43 Danish War Tournament.

== Births ==
=== January–March ===
- 27 March – Jørgen Hansen, welterweight boxer (died 2018)

=== April–June ===
- 16 April – Erling Kroner, jazz trombonist, composer and bandleader (died 2011)
- 13 May – Kurt Trampedach, painter (died 2013)
- 17 May – Jette Nevers, textile artist
- 24 May – Svend Auken, politician (died 2009)
- 15 June – Poul Nyrup Rasmussen, politician, former Danish Prime Minister, President of PES
- 24 June – Birgit Grodal, economist (died 2003)

=== July–October ===
- 13 August – Margrethe Agger, textile artist
- 30/31 August – Carl Henrik Clemmensen, journalist and editor (born 1901)
- 16 October – Erik Rud Brandt, fashion designer and businessman (died 2023)
- 18 October – Birthe Rønn Hornbech, politician

== Deaths ==
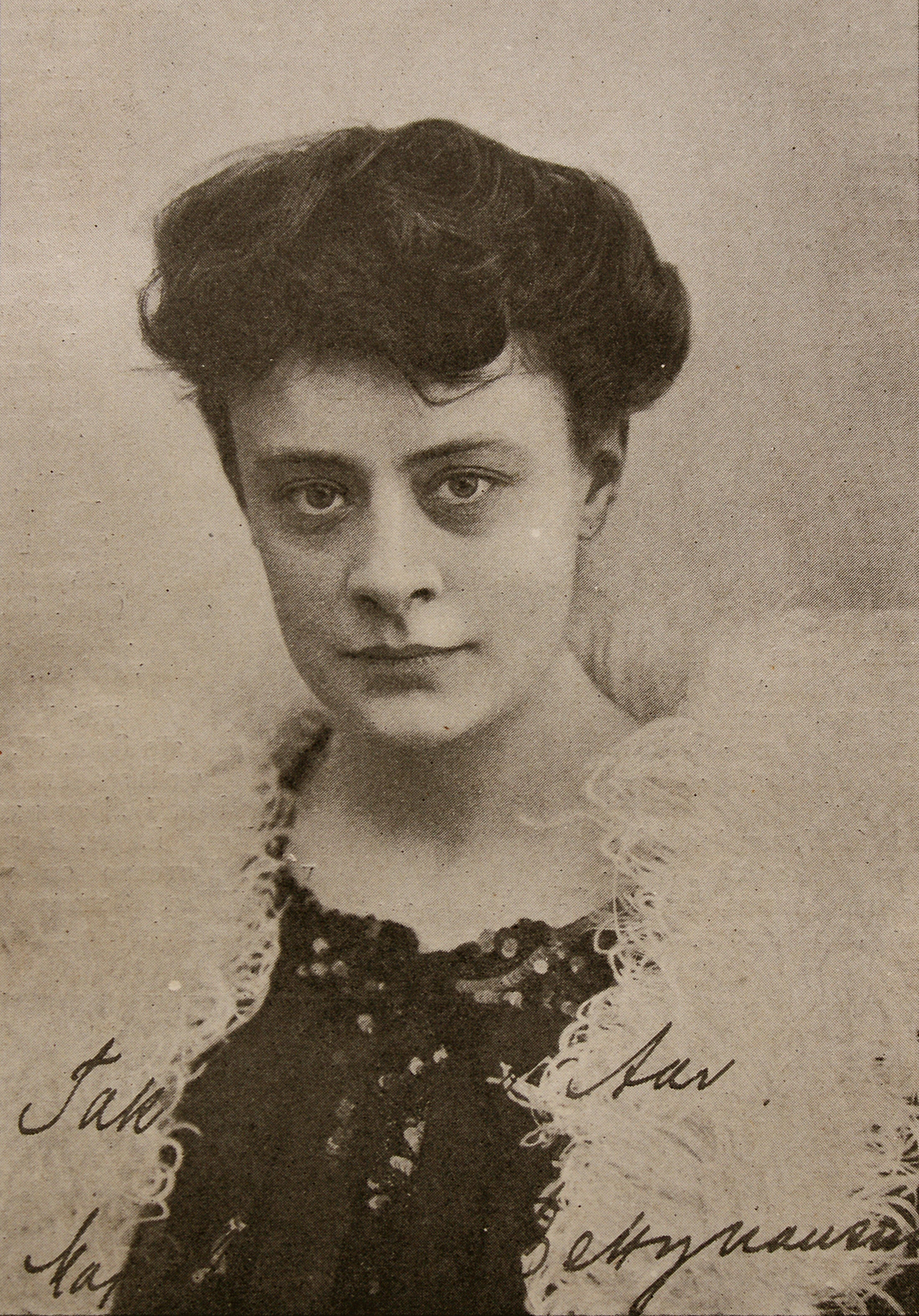
Betty Nansen.

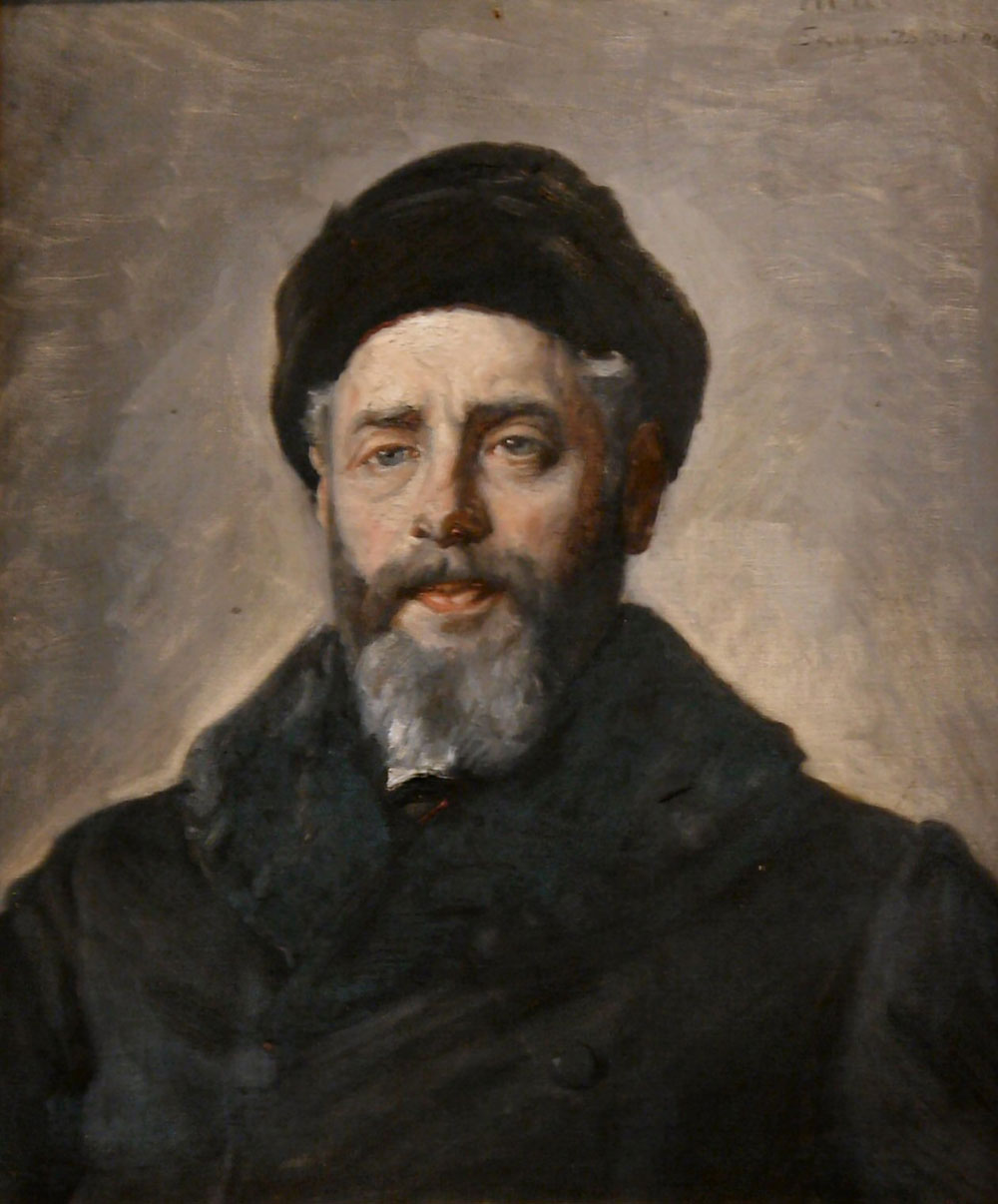
Henrik Pontoppidan.

=== January–March ===
- 30 January – Karen Hannoverm ceramist (born 1872)
- 9 February – Povl Bentzon, engineer and land surveyor (born 1858)
- 24 February – Thomas Madsen-Mygdal, farmer, politician, Prime Minister of Denmark 1926–29 (born 1876)
- 15 March – Betty Nansen, actress and theatre director (born 1873)

=== April–June ===
- 9 April – Edvard Weie, painter (died 1879)
- 25 April – Julie Marstrand, sculptor (born 1882)
- 30 April – Otto Jespersen, linguist (born 1860)
- 21 May – Ivar Bentsen, architect (born 1876)
- 27 June – Knud Arne Petersen, architect and artistic director (born 1862)

=== July–September ===
- 28 July – Sophus Wangøe, cinematographer (born 1873)
- 21 August – Henrik Pontoppidan, Nobel Prize-winning writer (born 1857)

=== October–December ===
- 5 October – Ole Olsen, filmmaker and Nordisk Film-founder (born 1863)
- 30 November – Holger-Madsen, actor (born 1878)
