= 1946 in Denmark =

- Decades: 1920s; 1930s; 1940s; 1950s; 1960s
- See also: Other events of 1946; List of years in Denmark

Events from the year 1946 in Denmark.

== Incumbents ==
- Monarch – Christian X
- Prime minister – Knud Kristensen

== Events ==
- 5 January – Flemming Helweg-Larsen is executed executed in the first application of the capital punishment in Denmark in 54 years.
- 30 August – Princess Anne-Marie, future Queen of Greece, is born to Crown Prince Frederik and Crown Princess Ingrid of Sweden.

== Sports ==
=== Football ===
- B03 wins the 1945–46 Danish 1st Division. It is their ninth Danish football championship.

== Births ==
=== January—March ===
- 9 January – Mogens Lykketoft, politician
- 17 February – Valdemar Bandolowski, sailor
- 15 March – Krass Clement, photographer
- 19 March – Dan Turèll, writer (died 1993)

=== April–June ===
- 5 May – Leif Mortensen, cyclist
- 27 May – Niels-Henning Ørsted Pedersen, jazz bassist (died 2005)
- 2 June – Inga Nielsen, opera singer (died 2008)
- 25 June – Ulrik le Fevre, footballer and manager (died 2024)
- 29 June – Gitte Hænning, actress

=== July–September ===
- 30 August – Princess Anne-Marie, future Queen of Greece

=== October–December ===
- 27 October – Peter Martins, ballet dancer, choreographer
- 28 October – Niels Fredborg, cyclist
- 3 November – Holger Pedersen, astronomer

== Deaths ==
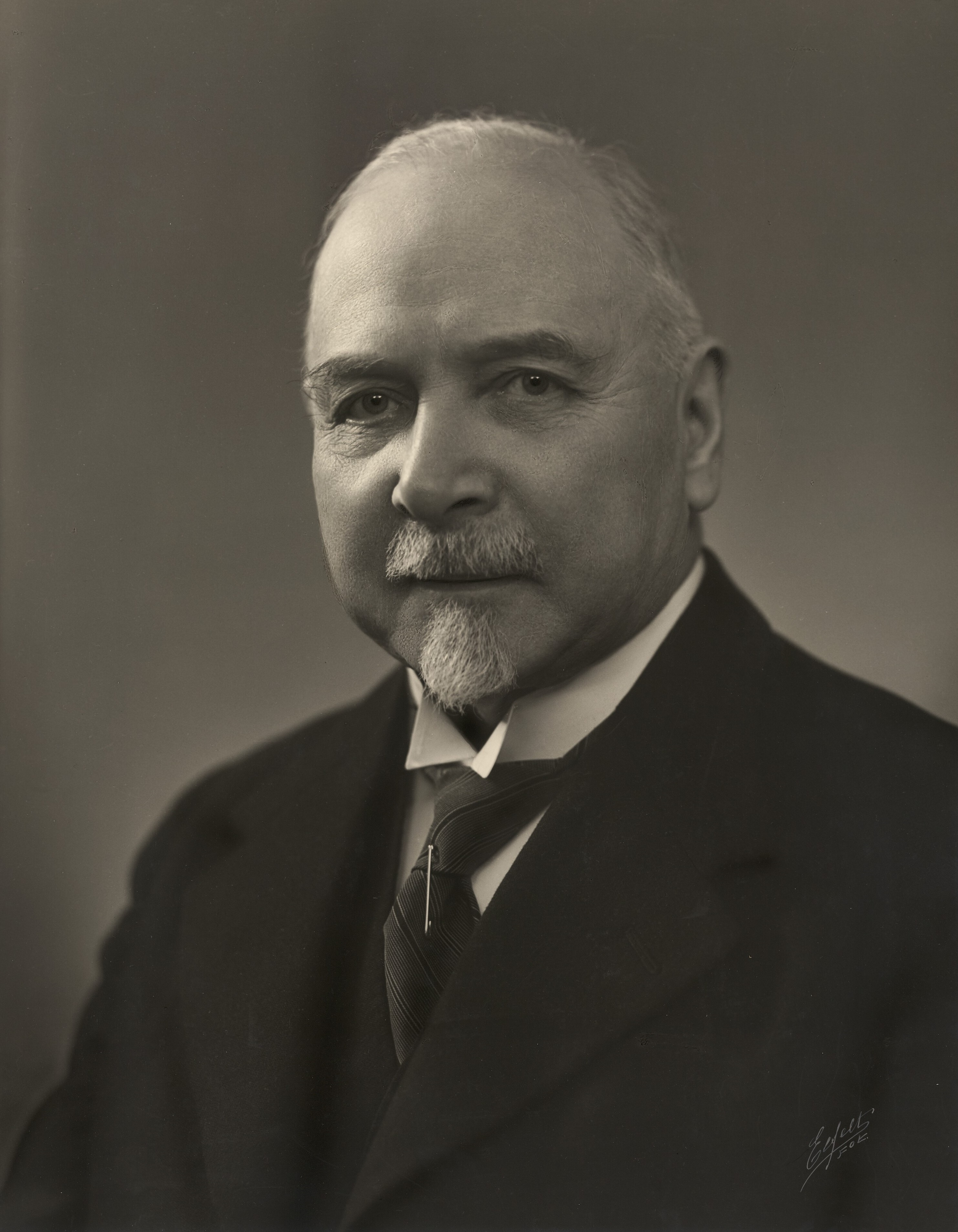
Carl Theodor Zahle.

=== January–March ===
- 5 January – Flemming Helweg-Larsen, Nazi Germany collaborator and murderer (born 1911)
- 3 February – Carl Theodor Zahle, politician, Council President of Denmark (born 1866)
- 9 March – William Wain Prior, major-general, commander-in-chief of the Royal Danish Army 1939–41 (born 1876)
- 26 March – Gerhard Heilmann, paleontologist, scientific illustrator (born 1859)

=== April–June ===
- 26 April – Oluf Ring, composer (born 1886)
- 20 May – Jacob Ellehammer, inventor (born 1871)
- 26 May – Petrine Sonne, stage and film actress (born 1870)

=== July–September ===
- 13 July – Valdemar Rørdam, national conservative poet, author of "Denmark in a Thousand Years" (born 1872)
- 31 August – Paul von Klenau, composer and conductor (born 1883)

=== October–December ===
- 10 October – Eyvind Johan-Svendsen, stage and film actor (born 1896)
- 15 December – Johannes Friis-Skotte, politician, Minister of Public Works (Transport) 1924–1926 and 1929–1935 (born 1874)

=== Date unknown ===
- Johanne Agerskov, intermediary (born 1873)
