= Nyhavn 15 =

Building in Copenhagen, Denmark

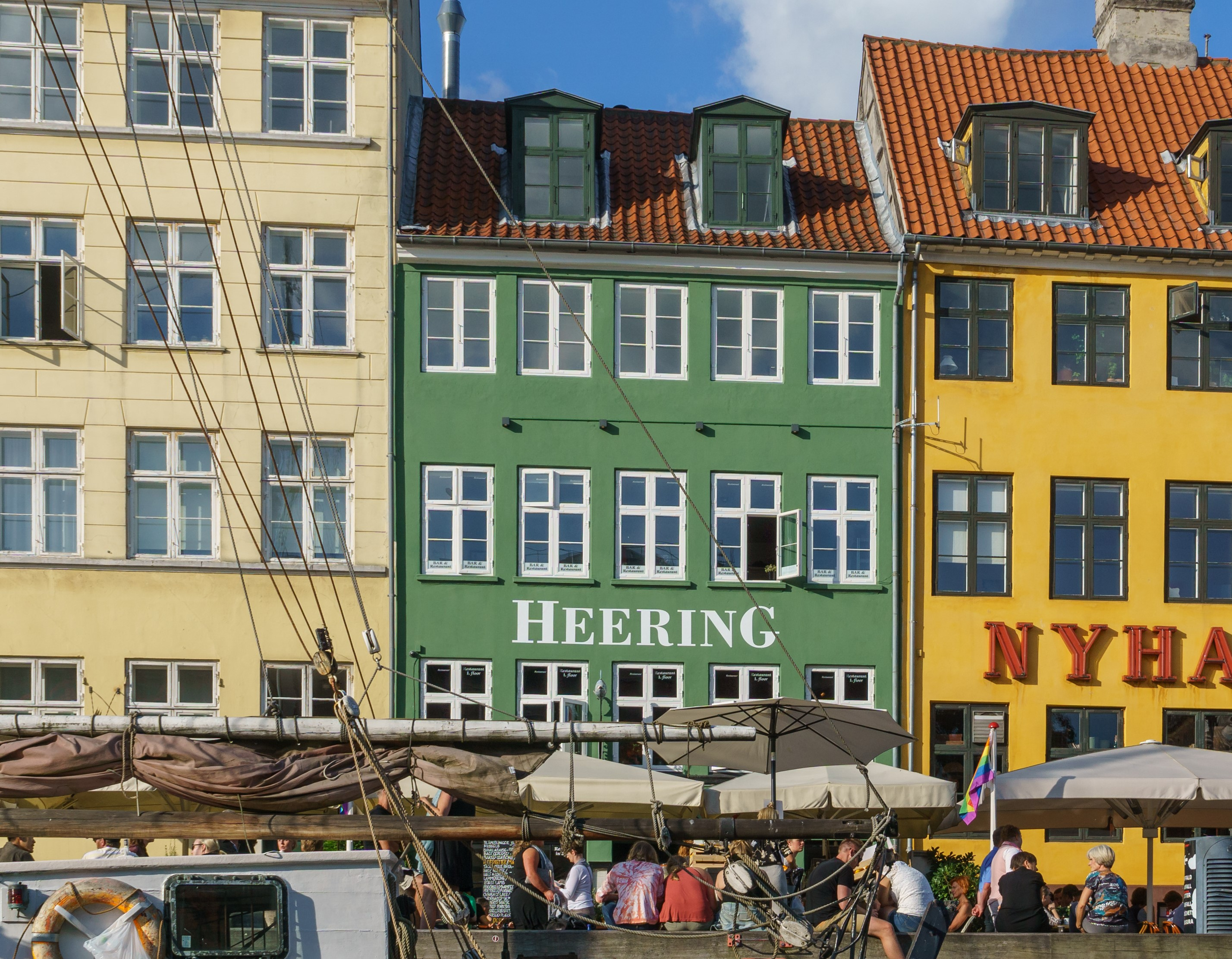
- The house seen from the other side of the canal
- Interactive map of the Nyhavn 15 area

General information
- Location: Copenhagen, Denmark
- Coordinates: 55°40′50″N 12°35′20.3″E
- Completed: 1681

Nyhavn 15 is a historic townhouse overlooking the Nyhavn Canal in central Copenhagen, Denmark. The building was listed in the Danish registry of protected buildings and places in 1945.

== History ==
=== 17th and 18th centuries ===
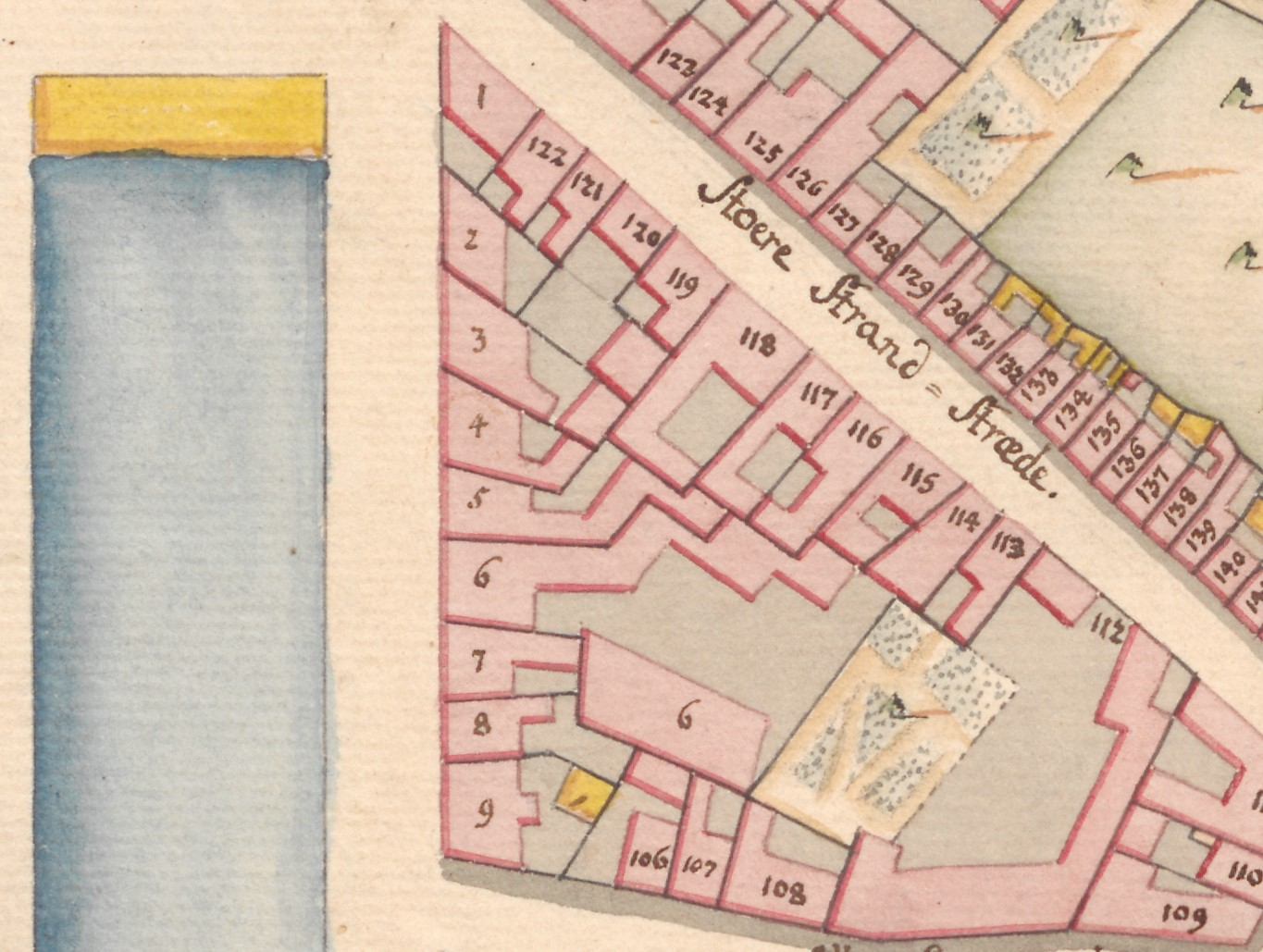
No. 7 seen on a detail from Christian Gedde's map of St. Ann's East Quarter, 1757

The building was constructed some time between 1673 and 1694. The property was listed in Copenhagen's first cadastre from 1689 as No. 8 in St. Ann's East Quarter, owned by skipper Peder Jonsen. In the new cadastre of 1756 it was again listed as No. 8 and belonged to skipper Jacob Bendtsen at that time.

Jørgen Alsing, who had returned to Denmark from Dutch India after making a fortune in the plantation industry, opened a tea and porcelain store in the building in 1765.

Maria Alsing, Alsing's widow, kept the building after her husband's death. At the time of the 1787 census, she lived there with their 18-year-old daughter Maria Chatrine, a maid and three lodgers.

=== 19th century ===
The building had by 1801 been acquired by Jørgen Hansen Kaløe. At the time of the 1801 census, he was away on a journey but his 18-year-old wife Anne Dorthea Kaløe was present in the home. The property was also home to two more households. Erich Kisling resided in the building with his two sons (aged 18 and 20) and a maid. The younger of the two sons was also away on a journey. Hans Christian Juel, a 59-year-old skipper, resided in the building with his 42-year-old wife Anne Clausen, their five children (aged two to 13), a maid and two lodgers (both first mates, styrmænd).

The property was again listed as No. 8 in the new cadastre of 1806. It was at that time still owned by Jørgen H. Kalløe.

At the time of the 1834 census, No. 8 was home to 12 residents in three households. Johannes Anholm (1811–1860), a ship captain (skobsfører), resided on the ground floor with his wife Christiane Køhler and two maids. Margrete Christine Stæger (née Jacobsen), the 71-year-old widow of a havnefoged, resided on the first floor with her 58-year-old daughter Ane Margrete Stæger. Christen Andersen, a workman, resided on the second floor with his Catrine Maria Lund, their two daughters (aged eight and 17) and two lodgers.

Anholm later sold the building and purchased a new one further down the canal at No. 34 (now Nyhavn 67). His tenants in the new building included the writer Hans Christian Andersen.

By 1840, the number of residents at No. 8 had increased to 20. Hans Christensen, a skipper, was now residing on the ground floor with his wife Christine Møller, their five children (aged eight to 23) and three lodgers. Margrethe Stæger was still residing with her daughter and a maid on the ground floor. Samson Moses Samson, a flour and oats merchant, resided on the second floor with his wife Birgitte Roeskilde, their four children (aged give to 16) and one maid.

The property was later operated as a hostel under the name Carl den Femtende (Charles XV) before it was acquired by Annie West and converted into a boarding house for retired sailors. Cafe West was based in the ground floor. It was replaced by the restaurant Kommandøren og sidenhen Hering restaurant og Bristol in 1985.

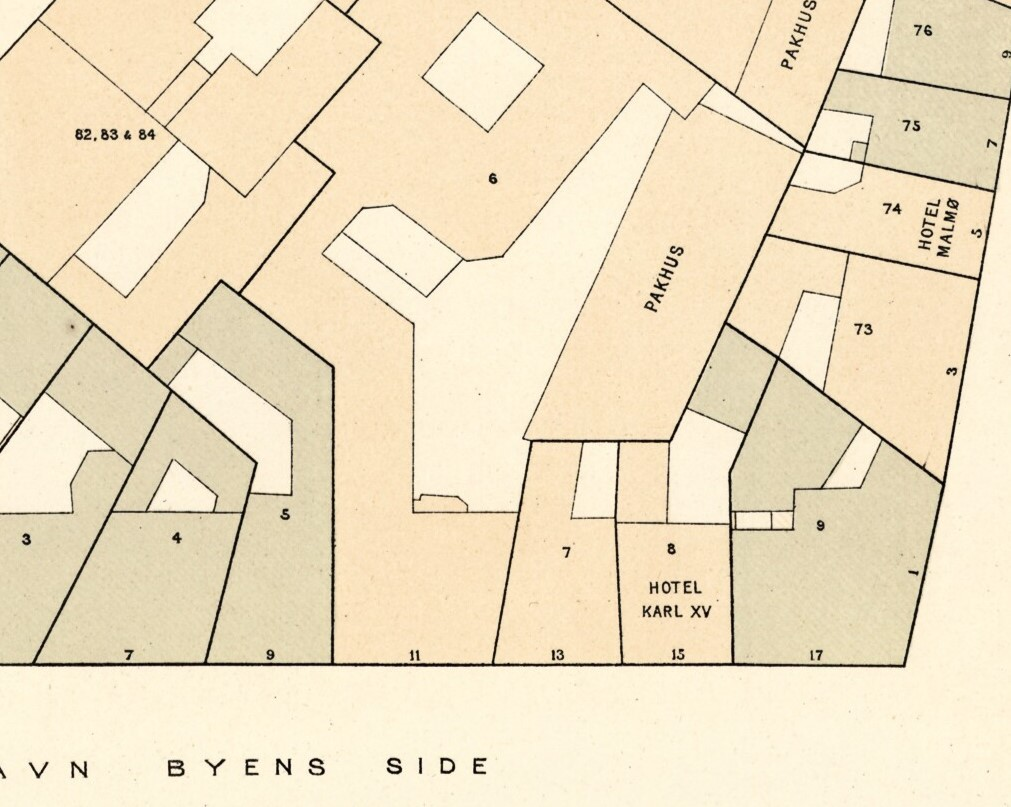
Nyhavn 15 seen on one of Berggreen's block plans of St. Ann's East Quarter, 1886–88

The property was home to just three residents at the 1860 census. Otto Wilhelm Forsblom, a jeweller, resided in the building with the apprentices Peter Lud. Møllman and Christian Fred. Grønholm.

The property was home to 10 residents at the 1880 census. Niels Jacob Nielsen, a hotelier, resided on the ground floor with his wife Nicoline Christine, their two children (aged six and eight), a maid, a male servant and a waiter. Carl Johan Kilberg, another waiter, resided on the third floor with his wife Frederikke née Seiersen. Sophie Dorthea Falkenstjerne, a widow, resided on the second floor.

=== 20th century ===
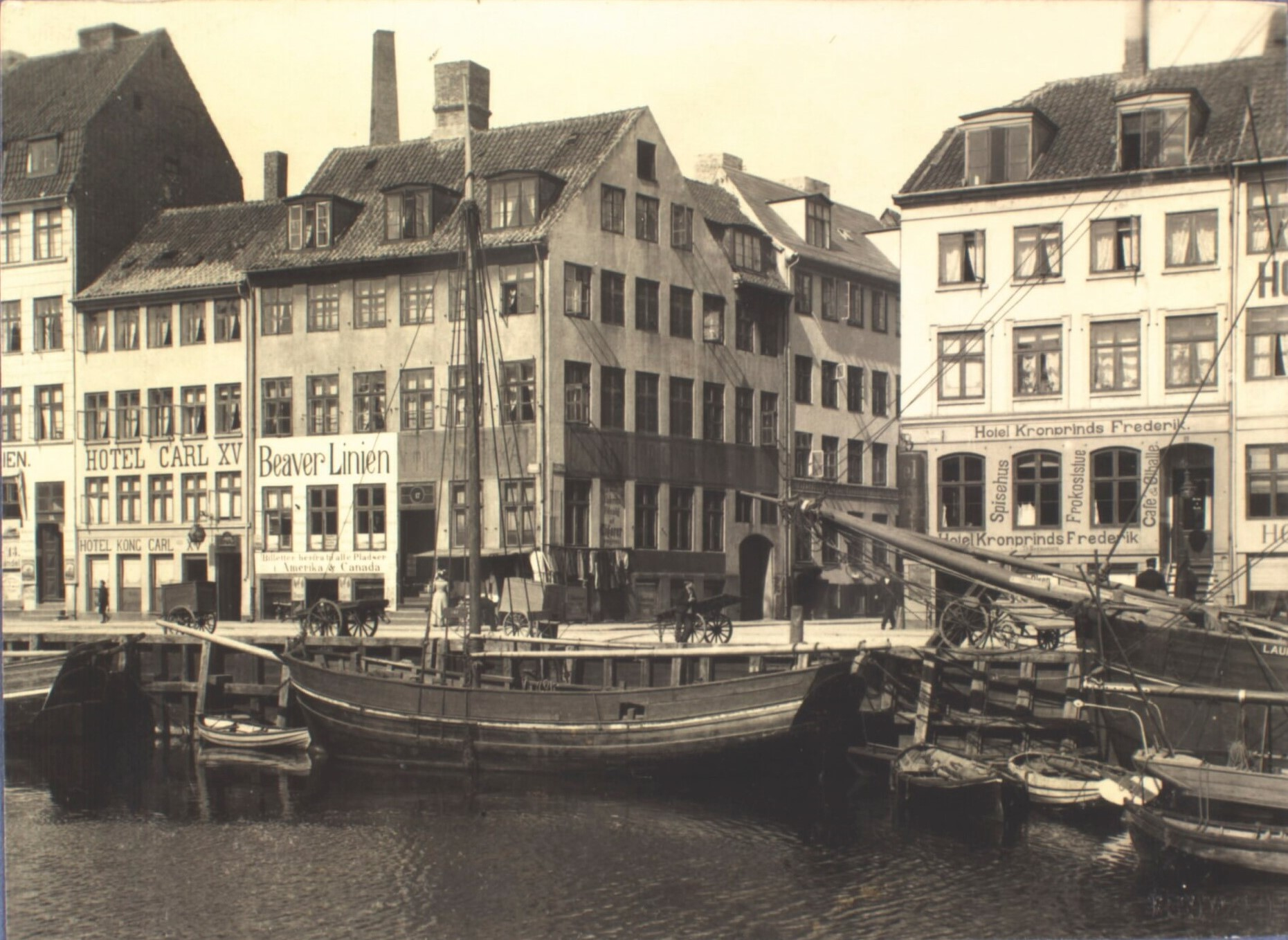
Hotel Carl XV seen in a photo by Fritz Theodor Benzen

The building was around the turn of the century operated as a hotel under the name Hotel Carl XV. It was listed on the Danish registry of protected buildings and places in 1845.

== Architecture ==
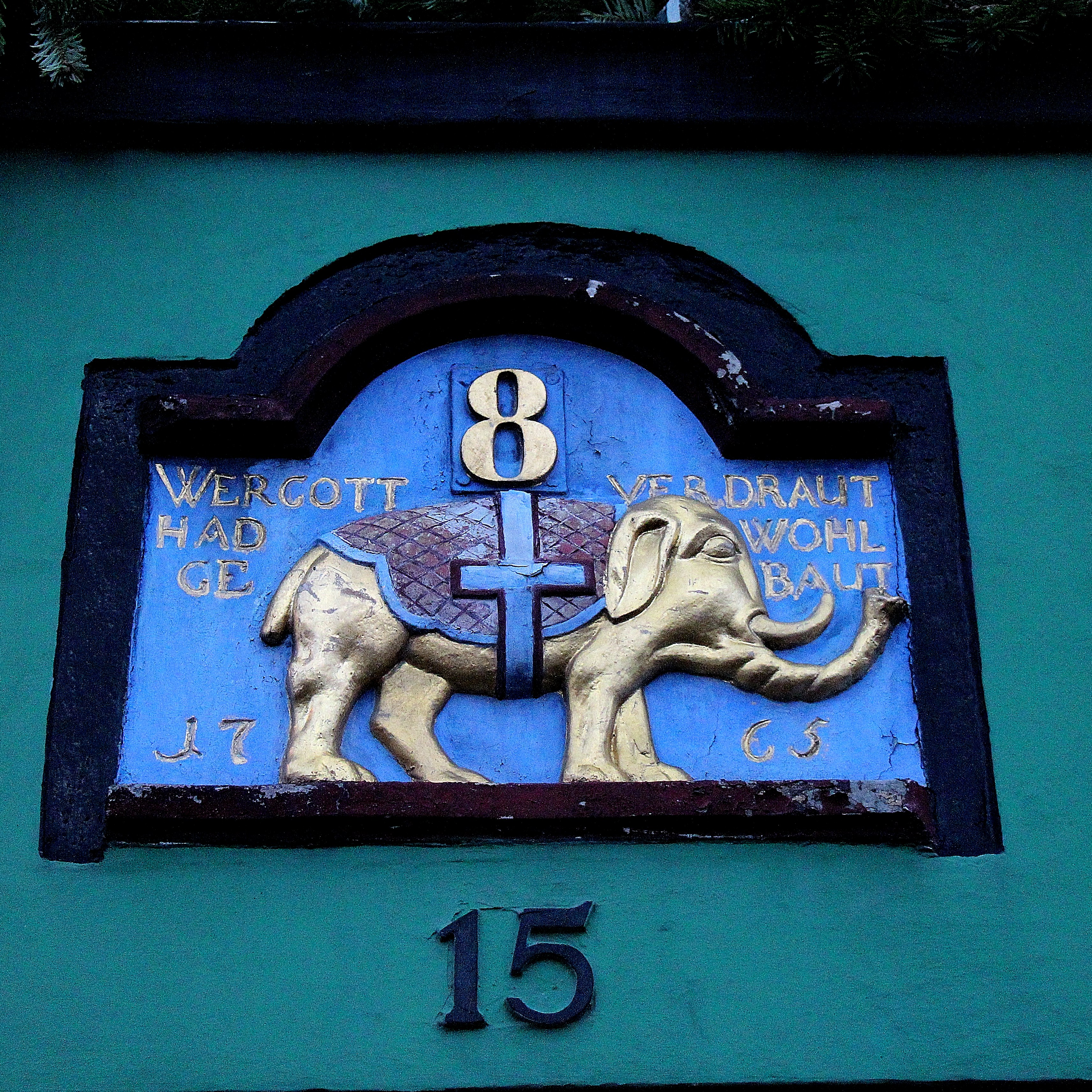
The elephant above the door

The building consists of three storeys and a basement and is four bays wide. On its rear is a small courtyard. The most distinctive feature of the building is a relief of an elephant mounted above the door. It was installed by Jørgen Alsing as an advertisement for his oriental products. An "8" above the elephant relief is an old cadastral number (matrikelnyummer) but has been the cause of some confusion when people have mistaken it for the house number (which is No. 15). The building was listed on the Danish Registry of Protected Buildings and Places in 1945.

== Today ==
Heering Restaurant & Bar is now based in the ground floor.

== Cultural references ==
Café West was used as a location in the feature film Hvad vil De ha.
