= Nyhavn 8 =

Historical building in Copenhagen, Denmark

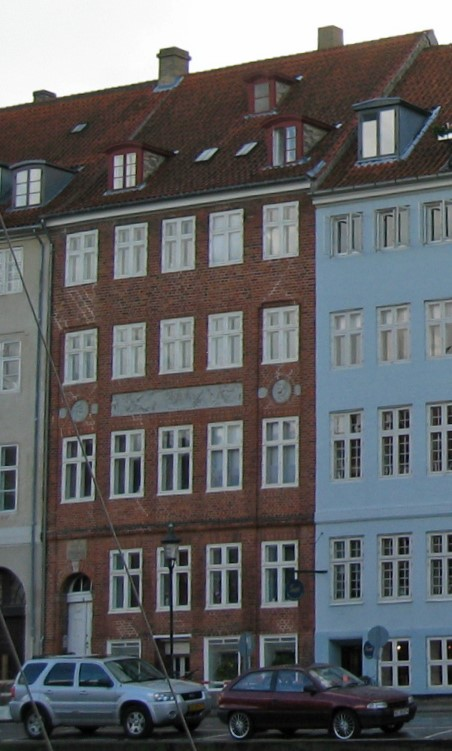
- Interactive map of the Nyhavn 8 area

General information
- Location: Copenhagen, Denmark
- Coordinates: 55°40′47.32″N 12°35′22.02″E
- Completed: 1774-76
- Renovated: 1846

Nyhavn 8 is an 18th-century property overlooking the Nyhavn canal in central Copenhagen, Denmark. It was listed in the Danish registry of protected buildings and places in 1918. A sandstone tablet with inscription above the arched main entrance commemorates a time when Dragør skippers used to stay in the building during the winter months.

== Architecture ==
Plan drawing, 1930-31

Drawing, 1930-31

The building is constructed in red brick with four storeys over a walk-out basement. The fourth floor was added in 1846. The five bays wide facade features a belt course above the ground floor, an embedded frieze flanked by two round portrait friezes between the windows of the second and third floors and a white-painted cornice. The frieze features reliefs of a large anchor and a cross as well as a number of women and animal figures. The two portrait reliefs are most likely depictions of Niels Holst. They are themselves flanked by the architectural date "1774" ("17"/"74"). The arched main entrance is located in the bay farthest to the left. A sandstone tablet with an inscription above the doorway commemorates the time when the building housed the Dragør skippers. The hoååed roof is clad in red tile. The roof ridge is pierced by a chimney.

A seven-bay-long side wing extends from the rear side of the building. The two first bays are inwardly canted to allow for an extra window towards the yard in the front wing. This short section of the side wing is four storeys tall. The five remaining bays are only three storeys tall but topped by a mansard roof, The facades facing the yard are plastered with iron vitirol.

== Today ==
The building contains a single apartment on each of the four floors. A fifth apartment is located in the garret of the front wing.

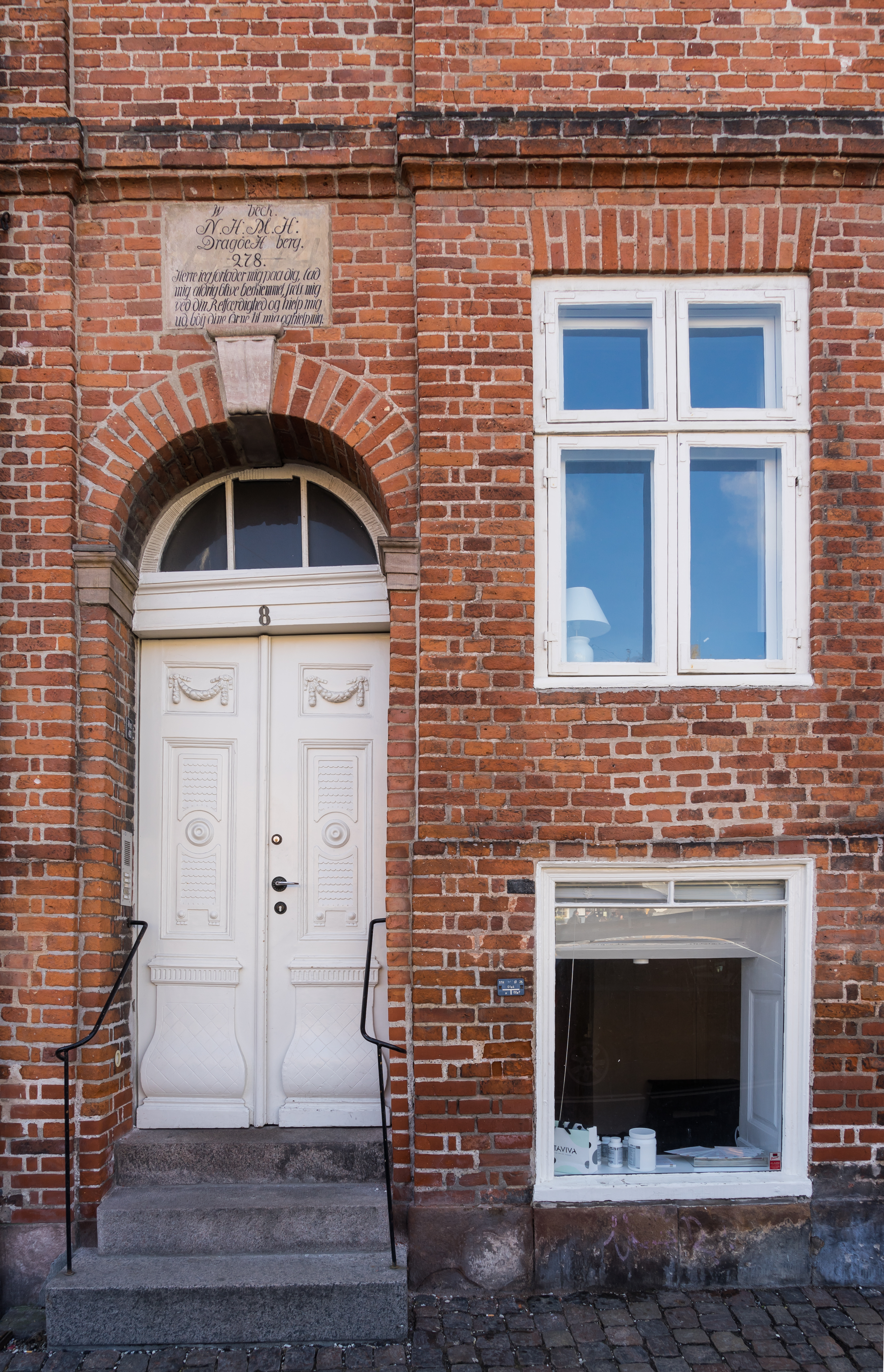
The main entrance

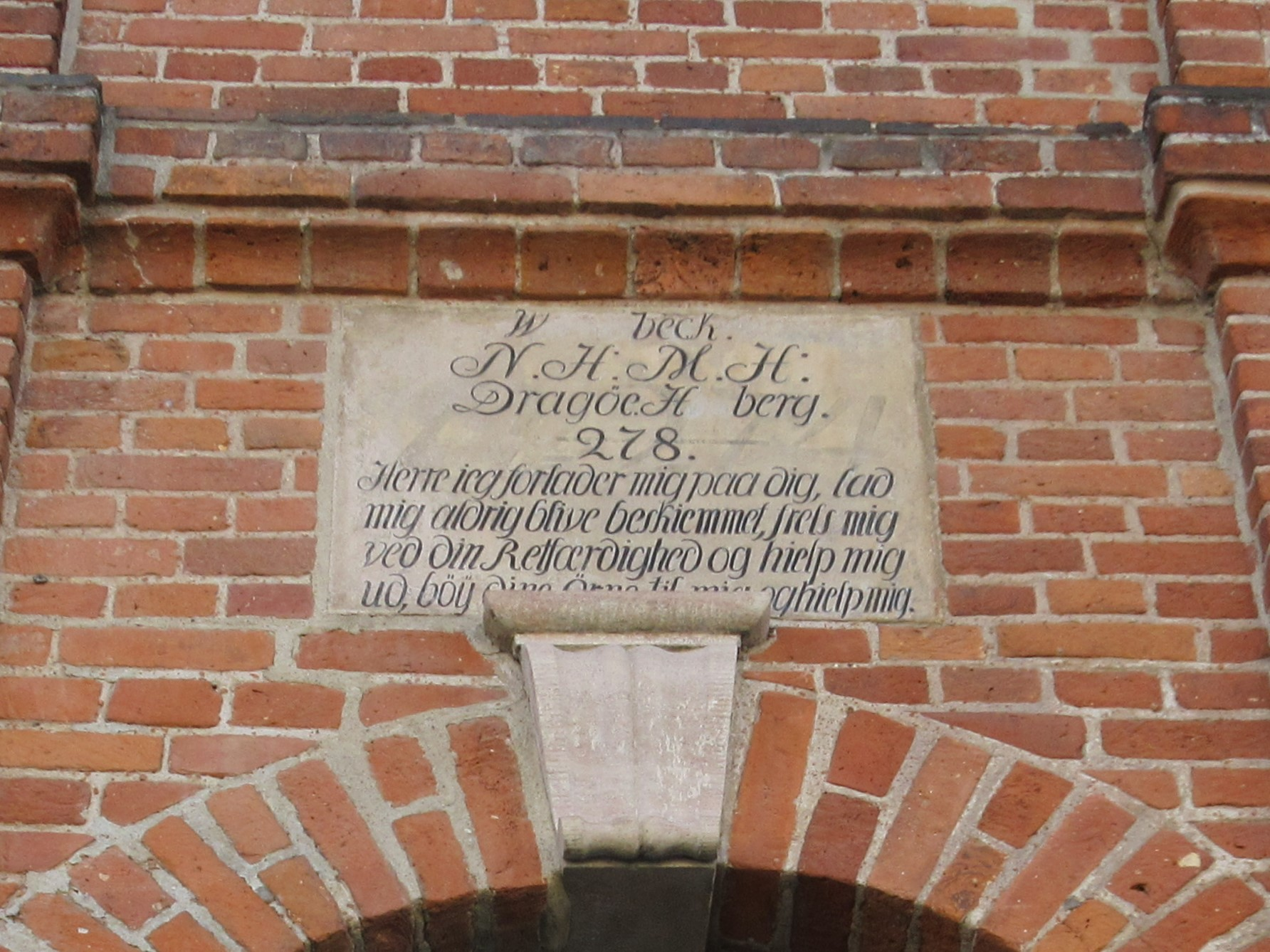
Detail of the sandstone tablet above the main entrance

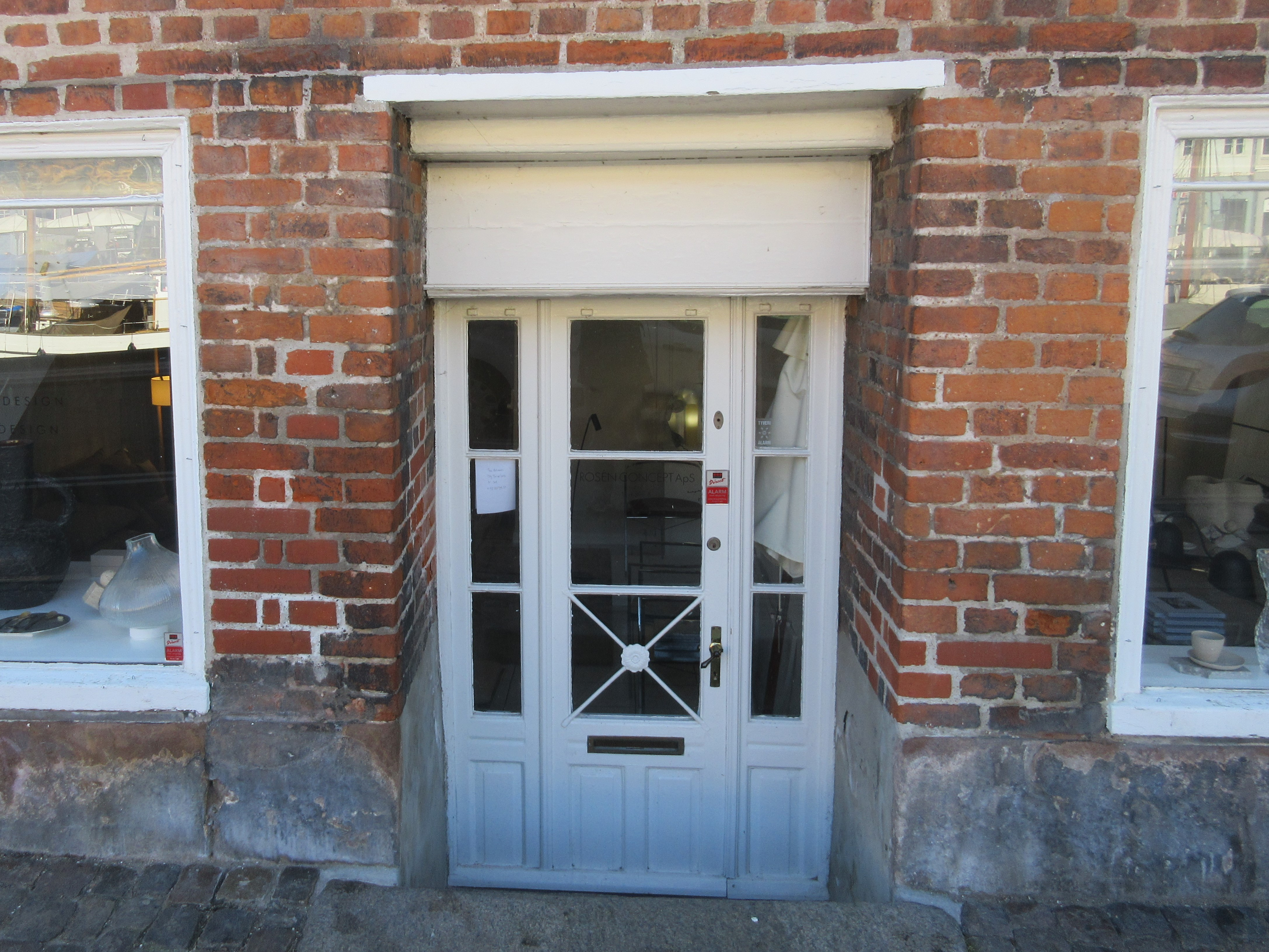
The basement entrance
