= Nyhavn 19 =

Building in Copenhagen

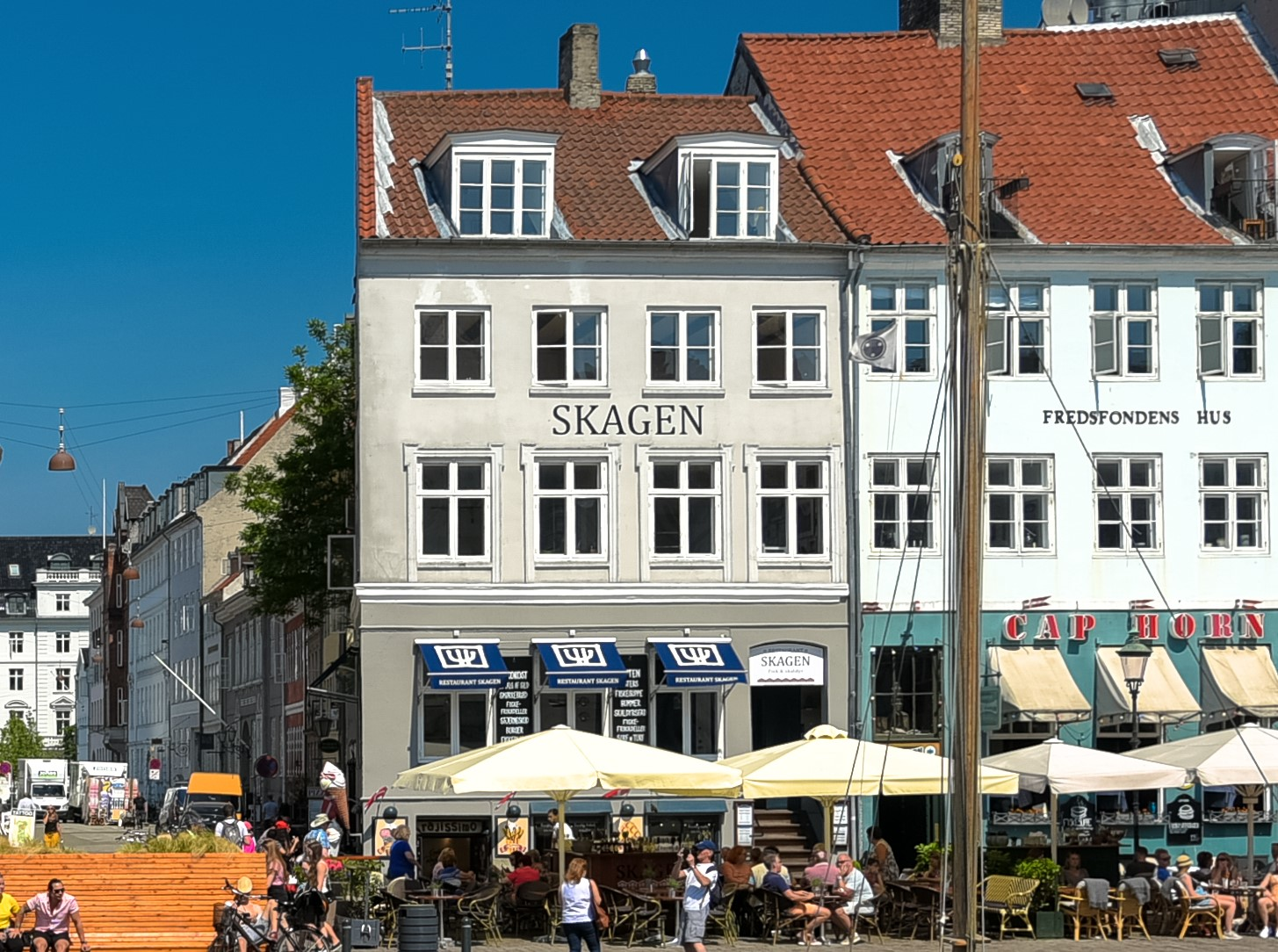
- Interactive map of the Nyhavn 19 area

General information
- Location: Copenhagen, Denmark
- Coordinates: 55°40′49.58″N 12°35′21.80″E

Nyhavn 19 is a property located at the corner of Nyhavn (No. 10) and Lille Strandstræde (No. 2) in central Copenhagen, Denmark. The building was listed on the Danish registry of protected buildings and places.

== History ==
=== 17th and 18th centuries ===
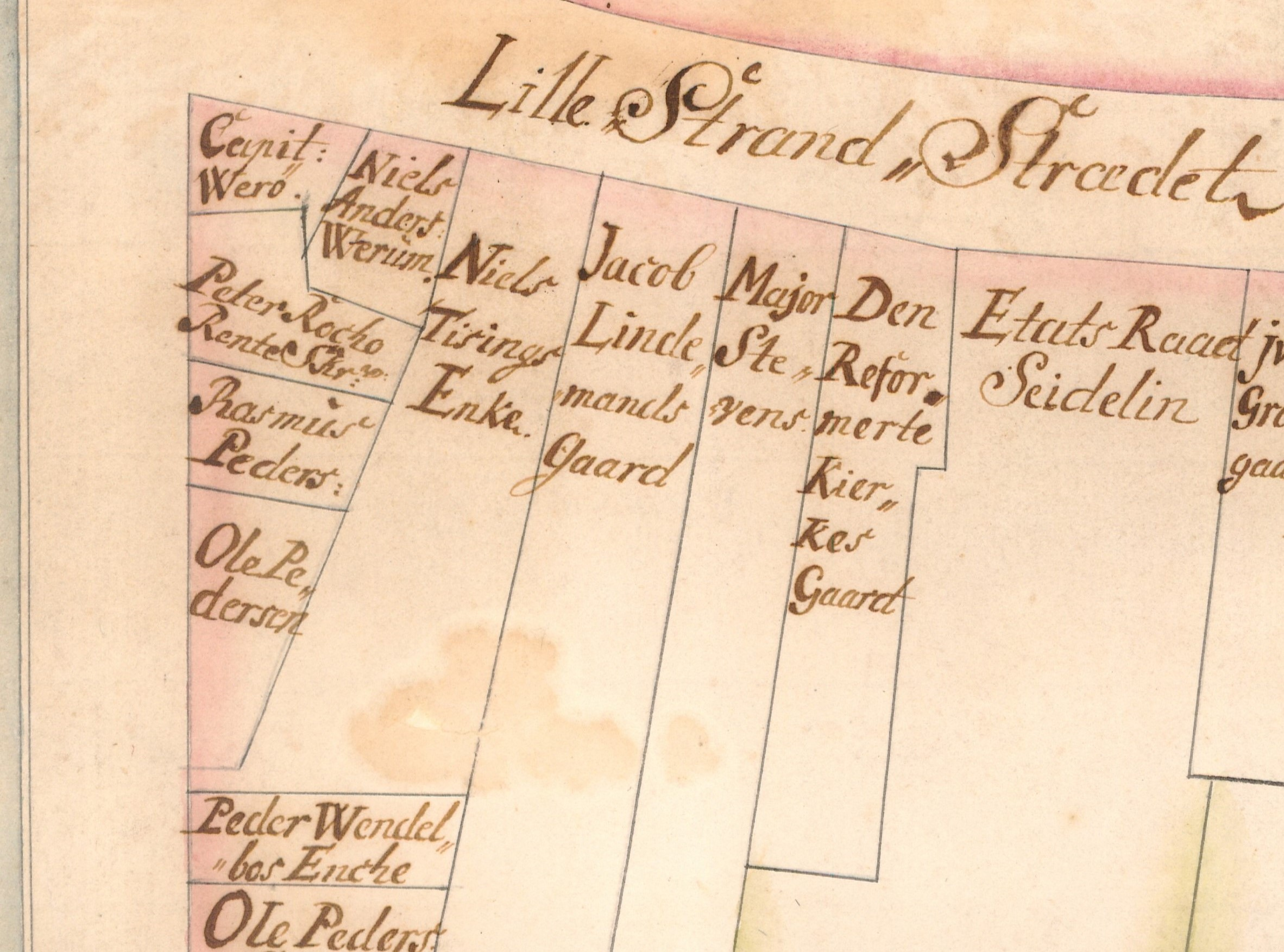
The property seen in a detail from a plan of the area from 1731

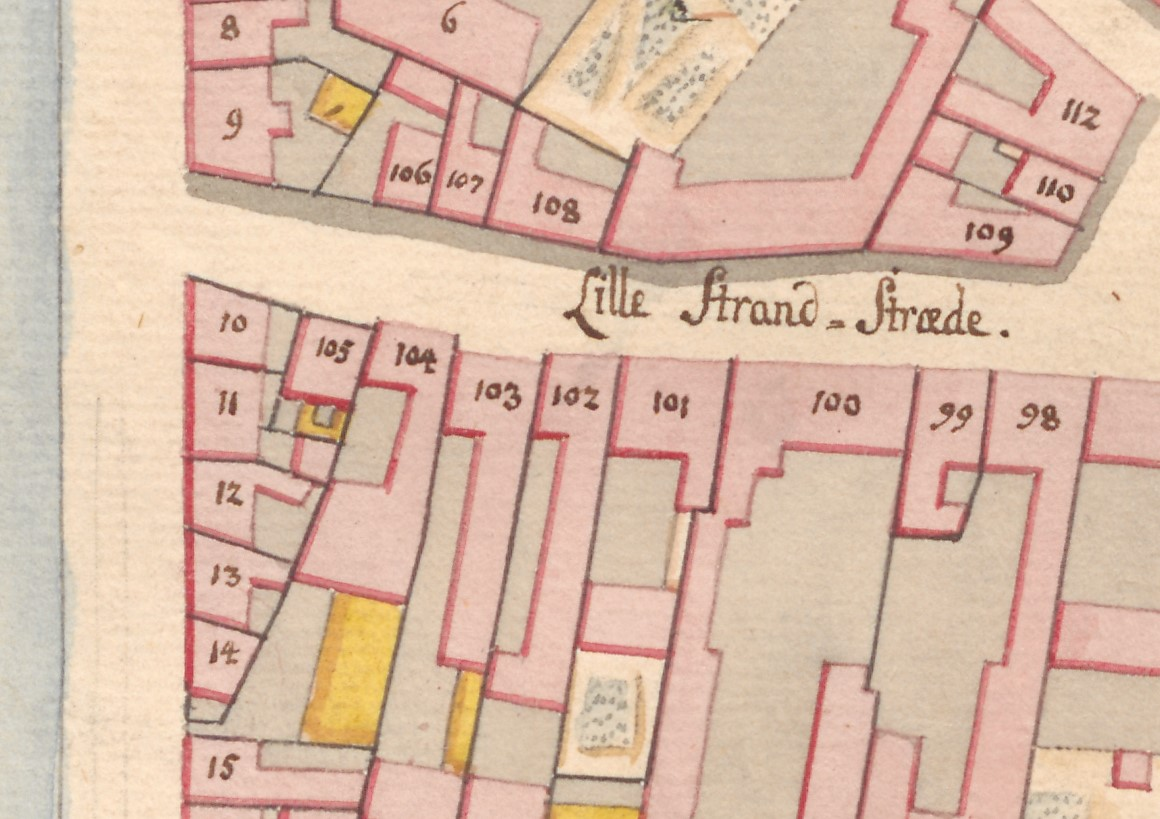
No. 10 seen in a detail from Christian Gedde's map of St. Ann's East Quarter, 1757

The two corner properties Nyhavn 17 and Nyhavn 19 were prior to the construction of Lille Strandstræde part of the same property. It was listed as No. 9 in St. Ann's East Quarter (Sankt Annæ Øster Kvarter) in Copenhagen's first cadastre of 1689. It was at that time owned by stonemason Hans Friedrich.

A two-storey building was constructed at the site before 1713. The property was by 1756 as No. 10 owned by skipper Rasmus Brander. The building was heightened with an extra storey some time between 1766 and 1787.

=== Peter Hallesen ===
No. 10 was home to two households at the 1787 census. Peter Hallesen, a grocer (urtekræmmer), resided in the building with his wife Wibecke Sophie Neergaard, their six-year-old son, a maid and an apprentice. Peter Koefod, a helmsman (styrmand), resided in the building with his wife Bolene Wendelboe, their three children (aged three to seven) and a maid.

At the time of the 1801 census, Peter Hallesen resided in the building with his wife Sophie Wergaard, their two youngest children (aged 14 and 16), his employee Gunder Sadolin Hallesen, two lodgers and a maid.

The property was again listed as No. 10 in the new cadastre of 1806. It was at that time still owned by Peder Hallesen.

=== 1834 census ===
No. 10 was home to four households at the time of the 1834 census. Ane Cathrine Nielsen, widow of merchant (grosserer) A.L. Schmidt and the owner of the property, resided on the second floor with her 20-year-old son Lars Nicolay Schmidt and one maid. Georg Heinrich Leonhard Schou, a volunteer in Slesvigske Holstenske, Lauenborgske Cancellie, resided on the ground floor. Otto von Zytphen, a second lieutenant at the Life Guards on Foot, resided on the first floor. Frederik Nielsen, a rye bread baker and flour seller, resided in the basement with his Ane Kirstine Soelberg, their three-year-old daughter Johan Frederik Nielsen and one maid.

=== Hotel Stadt Aalborg ===
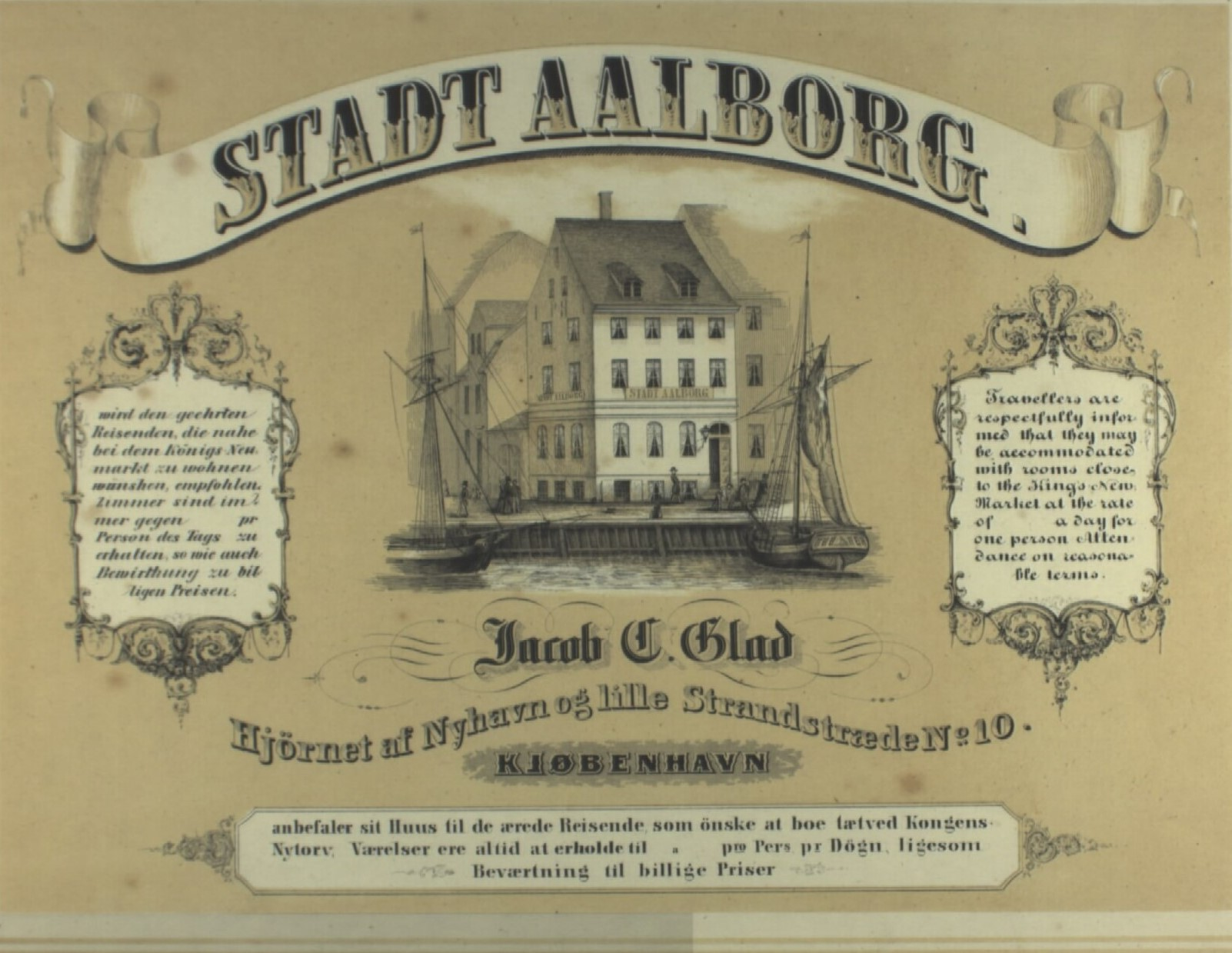
Advertisement for Hotel Stadt Aalborg

No. 10 was home to two households at the 1845 census. Jacob Christian Glad, a skipper, lived there with his wife, four children and two maids. Sophie Haburg, a flour merchant, lived there as a widow with one maid.

The property was again home to two households at the 1850 census. Christian Schmidt, a flour and rolled oats merchant, resided in the building with his wife Sophie Schmodt. Jacob Christian Glad, a hotel owner, resided in the building with his wife Juliane Frederikke Glad (née Riche), their five children (aged five to 15), one male servant and four maids.

The hotel was still owned by Jacob Christian Glad at the time of the 1860 census. He resided in the building with his wife, four of their children and three maids. Peter Christian Westphal, a new flour merchant, resided in the building with his wife Christiane Westphal (née Andersen), their three children (aged six to 12) and two maids.

The building was for many years operated as a hotel under the name Hotel Stadt Aalborg. Adolf Gustav Richardi, a new hotelier, resided in the building at the 1880 census. He lived there with his wife Anna Marie Louis Augusta Richardi, their eight-year-old daughter, two maids and the helmsman Julius Adolf Poul Huber Seiger. Martin Peter Hansen, a retailier, resided in the basement.

=== 20th century ===
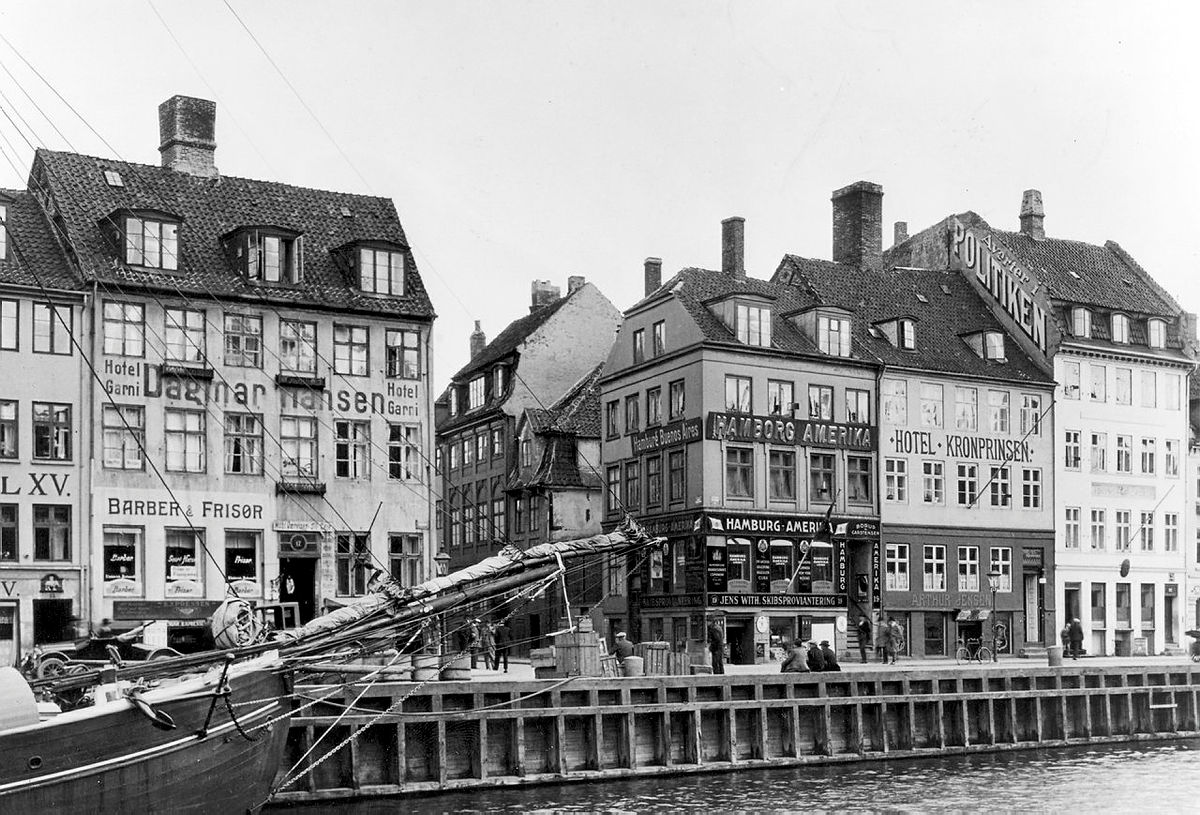
The building in 1923

A ticket office for the Hamburg-America Line was for a while based in the building. A ship chandler was located in the basement. The building was listed in 1973.

== Architecture ==
The building has four bays towards both streets. Its roof is a saddle roof.

== Today ==
Rajissimo 3, an ice cream parlor, and a restaurant called Sailors Corner are based in the building.
