= Holger Pedersen =

Holger Pedersen may refer to:

- Holger Pedersen (linguist) (1867–1953), Danish linguist
- Holger Pedersen (astronomer) (born 1946), Danish astronomer, at the European Southern Observatory

== See also ==
- Holger Petersen (disambiguation)
