= Lundtofte Flyveplads =

Former airport in Lundtofte, Denmark

- IATA: none; ICAO: none

Summary
- Location: Lundtofte, Denmark
- Coordinates: 55°47′14″N 12°31′17″E

Map
- Location within Denmark

Lundtofte Flyveplads (Lundtofte Aerodrome) is a former airport for both military and civilian use. Currently, the Technical University of Denmark (DTU) is built on the site. The airport opened in 1917 and the last flight was in 1959.

== History ==
The navy flying school was looking for a new airfield location, since the Kløvermarken airfield they used at the time was to be closed soon due to the expansion of Copenhagen. A suitable area of around 7.7 hectares (19 acres) was found at Lundtofte. In March 1917, approval was given for the purchase of 22 hectares (54 acres) at the site and budget for construction of airfield facilities was reserved.

=== Inauguration and early years ===
The airfield was inaugurated June 22, 1917. Five aircraft would fly from the old airfield of Kløvermarken to Lundtofte and back again. Chief of the two airfields Jeff HA Hammelev was flying one of the aircraft. The flight from Kløvermarken to Lundtofte went smoothly, and festivities were held at Lundtofte. However, shortly after their landing, thunderclouds appeared, and Hammelev, who had an important meeting in Copenhagen, took off to fly back to Kløvermarken together with a mechanic, to avoid the bad weather. At Ermelunden they were caught in the bad weather and crashed. Hammelev did not survive the crash, and the mechanic was badly injured.

Already two years after its inauguration, the airfield was rented out for civilian use. Air shows and aerobatics were organized on the site and planes took off from the airfield to drop flyers, display advertising banners and to distribute newspapers. In 1921 smuggling flights took off from Lundtofte, smuggling Danish silver coins to Sweden. After lawsuits, the company that exploited the airfield went bankrupt.

It wasn't until 1926 that the airfield was used more intensively again, with it being used for training flights from Kløvermarken. In 1934, most training was moved to Værløse and Lundtofte was mainly used to practice emergency landings.

In 1937 a Danish company started assembling Piper J-3 Cub aircraft at Lundtofte, and buyers could also learn to fly the aircraft from Lundtofte.

=== World War II ===
With the start of World War II (1939–1945) and the resulting fuel rationing, whereby most civilian activity at the airfield was discontinued.

In August 1943, newspaper editor Carl Henrik Clemmensen was murdered near the airfield.

In November 1944, Holger Danske of the Danish resistance movement attacked the airfield with 30 people. The airfield was guarded by the Summer Corps. Within 15 minutes, all defenders were killed. All but one of the attackers managed to escape. The arrested member was sent to a concentration camp, but survived the war and returned to Denmark.

=== Thereafter ===
After World War II, the Danish Military police used the airfield for training. The last motorized flights took off in 1949. Throughout the 1950s the airfield was only used for flying model aircraft and gliders. On September 13, 1959, the last flights, with gliders, took off from Lundtofte. In 1961, the last airfield buildings were demolished and construction of the DTU buildings started.

== Remains ==
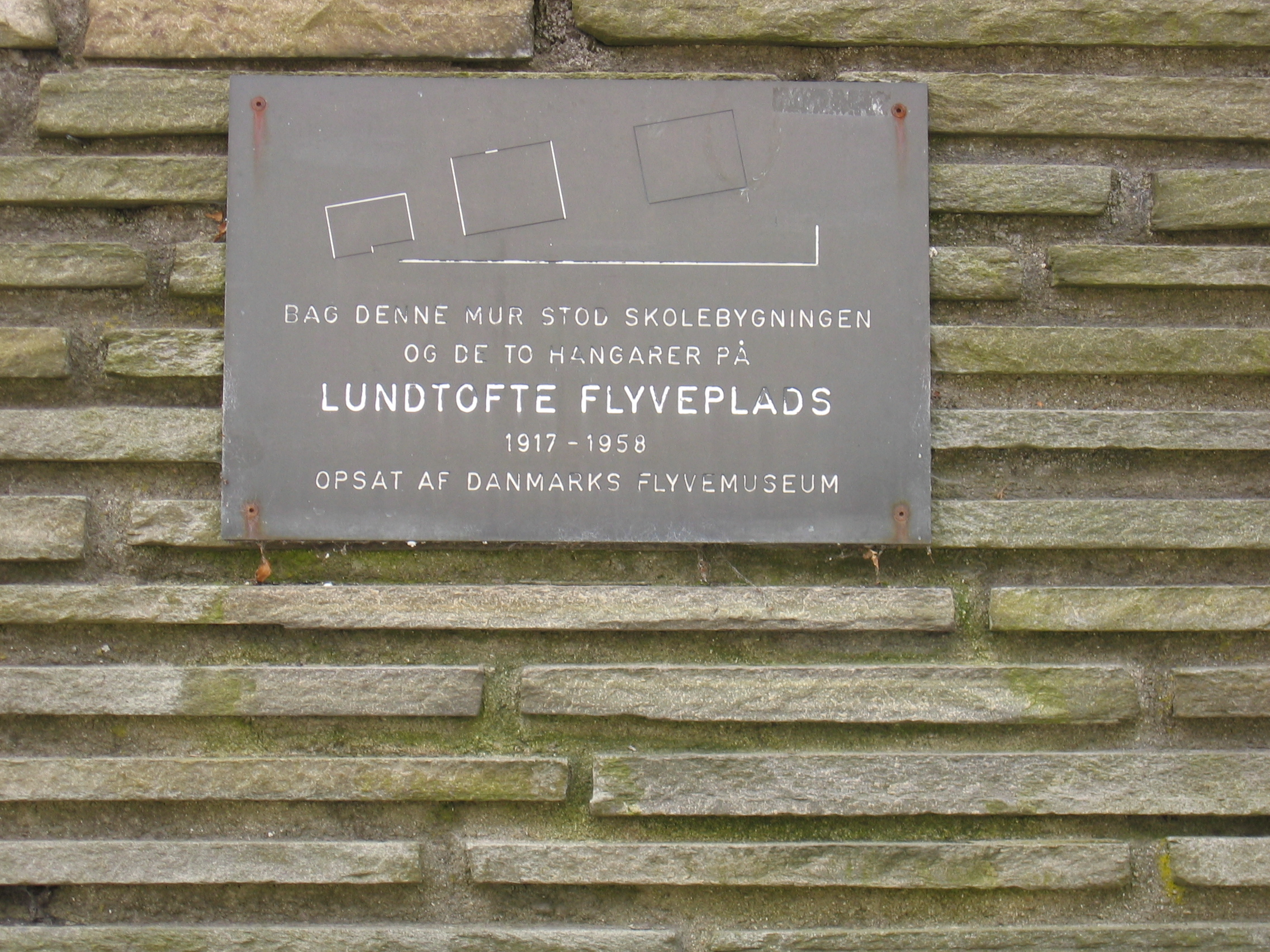
Memorial plate at the DTU campus

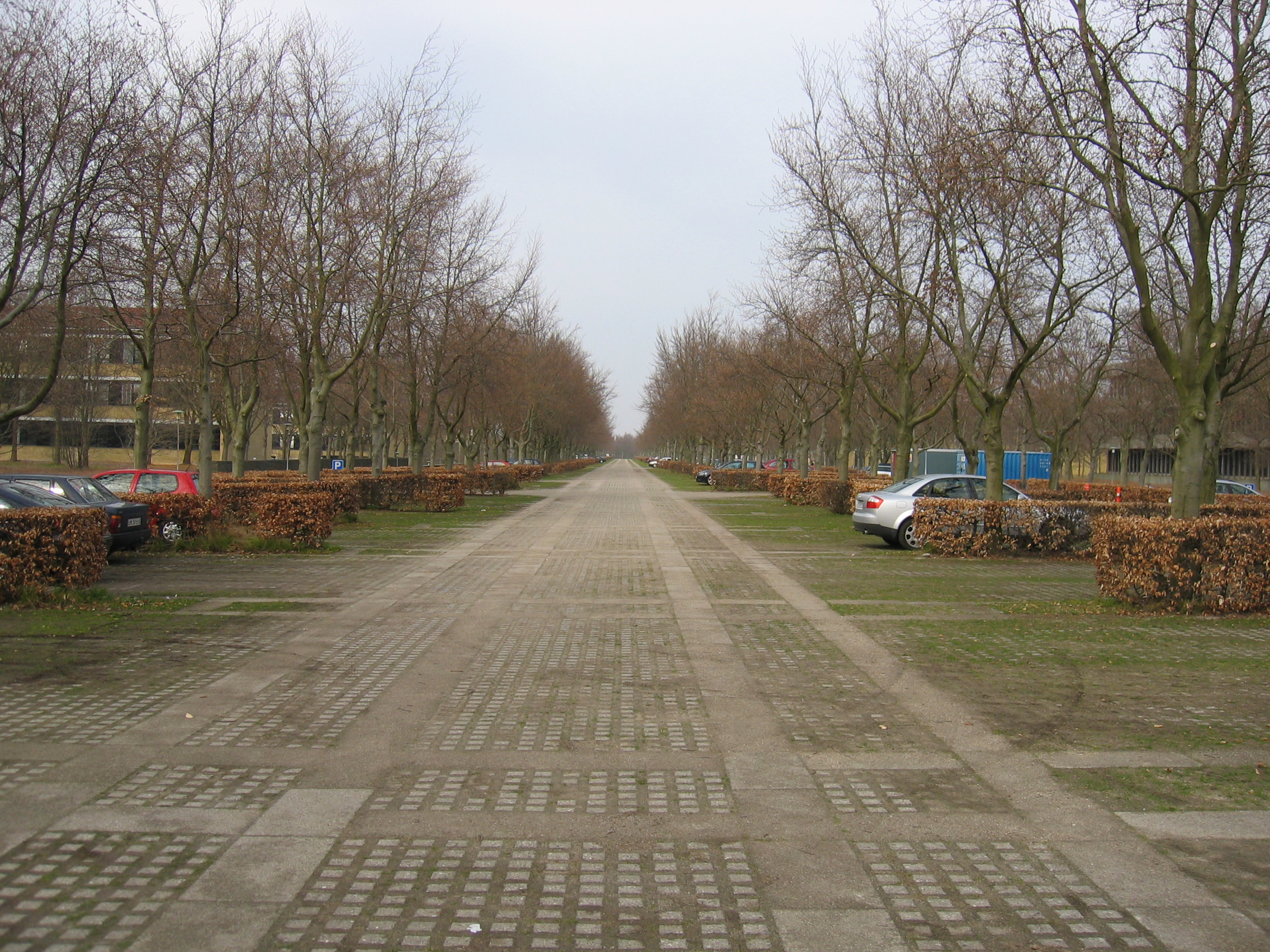
The central parking lot at DTU

The central parking space at DTU is at the place of the former aerodrome buildings, and at DTU building 204 a memorial plate was erected in 1981 with the text (translated from Danish):

Behind this wall stood the school building and the two hangars of Lundtofte Flyveplads (1917–1958) Erected by Denmark's Aviation Museum
