= Holger Petersen =

Holger Petersen may refer to:

- Holger Petersen (Danish businessman) (1843–1816), Danish businessman
- Holger Petersen (Canadian businessman) (born 1949), Canadian businessman

== See also ==
- Holger Pedersen (disambiguation)
