= Søren Kam =

Danish Nazi criminal (1921–2015)

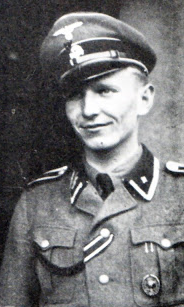
- Søren Kam as SS-Unterscharführer
- Born: 2 November 1921; Copenhagen, Denmark
- Died: 23 March 2015 (aged 93); Kempten, Germany
- Military career
- Allegiance: Nazi Germany
- Branch: Waffen-SS
- Service years: 1941–1945
- Rank: Obersturmführer
- Unit: SS Division Wiking
- Awards: Knight's Cross

Søren Kam (2 November 1921 – 23 March 2015) was a Danish junior officer in the Waffen-SS of Nazi Germany during World War II. He was wanted for murder in Denmark and listed by the Simon Wiesenthal Center as one of the most wanted Nazi war criminals.

== Early years ==
Kam was born on 2 November 1921 in Copenhagen, Denmark, as the second of nine children to Rasmus Hansen Kam and wife Inger née Hermansen.

The young Kam was a member of the youth faction of the DNSAP (NSU) where he was a close associate of Christian Frederik von Schalburg, one of his so called "blood boys". According to the Bovrup File, Kam's mother became a member of DNSAP in December 1940.

== World War II ==
Kam volunteered with the SS in June 1940. He served with the 5. SS-Panzergrenadier-Division Wiking on the Eastern Front. He was transferred to SS-Junkerschule Bad Tölz and was promoted to SS-Untersturmführer.

From 1 May to 2 September 1943, Kam was heading the school at Høveltegård responsible for the training of new members of the Schalburg Corps. The initial six week training had 50-70 recruits.

According to Efraim Zuroff of the Simon Wiesenthal Center, in August 1943 Kam participated as a Waffen-SS soldier in a robbery during which the birth records of the Jewish community in Denmark were stolen. He thereby ensured that the German file on Danish Jews was as complete as possible, in preparation for the attempt to arrest and deport them in October that year. Kam denied the allegation.

From 15 July to 2 September 1943, Kam had seven meetings with Werner Best, whose service calendar describes Kam as commander of the Schalburg Corps.

During the week before Saturday August 28, 1943, Kam participated in one such meeting with among others Best, who on the morning of that Saturday met with Erik Scavenius to make the demands that the following day led the Germans to officially dissolve the Danish government and institute martial law.

On the evening of 30 August 1943 or after midnight in Lundtofte, next to Lundtofte Airfield, Søren Kam and two others killed newspaper editor Carl Henrik Clemmensen, who was struck while standing by eight bullets fired from three different pistols. Kam later gave different explanations for his participation, lastly that the three shot the unarmed newspaper editor in self-defense.

The September 1943 issue of De frie Danske proclaimed Kam and Flemming Helweg-Larsen as Schalburg-bandits and the murderers of Clemmensen. The June 1944 issue denounced a female member of the Nazi Party, along with Carl Henrik Clemmensen's murderers, namely Flemming Helweg-Larsen and Søren Kam.

On 15 February 1945, the newspaper Politiken brought an official statement from Berlin via Reuters that on 7 February Adolf Hitler had awarded Kam, a company Commander of the SS-Panzergrenadier-Regiment "Germania", the Knight's Cross for "especially decisive action in the battle against the enemy" making Kam the third Dane to receive this award. The statement proceeded to mention that Kam had been wounded in battle several times and for battlefield bravery been awarded the Iron Cross Second and First Class, the Infantry Assault Badge, Close Combat Clasp and the silver Wound Badge and that he had seen combat in the battles of Dnipropetrovsk, Kharkiv, Cherkasy, Kovel and Warsaw.

== After the war ==
While in 1946 the Danish authorities presumed Kam to be dead they executed Helweg-Larsen for his part in the murder of Clemmensen. According to the evidence presented in the trial, Clemmensen had been killed using three different pistols firing eight bullets all impacting him while he was standing. A third accomplice in the murder, the SS-man Jørgen Valdemar Bitsch, was held in the Frøslev Prison Camp after the liberation, but managed to escape and his whereabouts remain unknown.

In 1956, Kam lived in West Germany under the name Peter Müller as stateless and he was therefore at risk of being extradited to Denmark on a murder charge. The same year, Kam applied for and obtained West German citizenship. In 1968, the public prosecutor in Munich investigated the murder. Kam admitted to have fired at Clemmensen but only as an "act of solidarity" after Helweg-Larsen had shot and killed Clemmensen who was lying dead on the ground. The case against Kam was dropped in 1971 on the principle of in dubio pro reo.

In 1985, Minister of Justice of Denmark Erik Ninn-Hansen confirmed that there was still a warrant for the arrest of Kam. The statement formed part of a response to a question from member of parliament Jørgen Lenger, who had been informed via telephone by Kam personally that Kam had visited his family in Denmark several times. In 1986, Kam and the two other Danish bearers of the Knight's Cross posed for a photograph together with Christian Frederik von Schalburg's widow, Helga Schalburg, in Ulrichsberg in the Austrian state Kärnten.

In 1998, Kam was interrogated again because his explanation that he shot Clemmensen as he was lying dead on the ground was contradicted by the autopsy report which shows that Clemmensen received all eight shots while standing. Kam changed his explanation and stated that, although unarmed, Clemmensen attacked Kam and his two associates who thus fired the eight shots in self-defence. In 1999, Danish Minister of Justice Frank Jensen requested an extradition of Kam. This was refused by Germany. This request was later repeated by Jensen's successor Lene Espersen.

In 2004, a grandson of Clemmensen, Søren Fauli, produced the documentary Min morfars morder (My grandfather's murderer) in which he himself interviewed Kam. During the interview, Fauli forgives Kam, but asks him to admit his guilt. The documentary was aired on Danish television in 2004 and 2005. On 21 September 2006, Kam was detained in Kempten, Bavaria in accordance with a European arrest warrant issued by Denmark. On 4 February 2007, Germany denied his extradition to Denmark, after a German court claimed that the killing of Clemmensen was not murder but manslaughter, thus falling under the statute of limitations, which had expired. Kam had stated that he admits having taken part in the abduction and killing of Clemmensen, but that he considers the case to be under the statute of limitations and the killing an accident.

In February 2008, BBC World Service presented a radio program titled The Danish Nazi. This included a recorded statement by Kam in which he says in English, "I am a good man, I never did anything wrong." According to the London Daily Telegraph, while in Germany, Kam "has regularly attended veterans' rallies of SS men. He has also been closely associated with Heinrich Himmler's daughter Gudrun Burwitz and her network Stille Hilfe (Silent Aid), set up to support arrested, condemned or fugitive former SS men." As of 1 April 2014, he was number five on Simon Wiesenthal Center's list of most wanted Nazi war criminals.

Kam wrote his memoirs and had a middle man hand them over to head of research at the Royal Library, Denmark John T. Lauridsen and Danish historian Mikkel Kirkebæk, so they could publish them after his death. The 400 page book The memoirs of Søren Kam (Danish: Søren Kams erindringer) is prefaced and commented by Lauridsen and published in Danish in September 2015.

On 23 March 2015, Kam died in Kempten at the age of 93, two weeks after his wife.

== See also ==
- List of fugitives from justice who disappeared
