= 1942–43 Danish War Tournament =

Danish War Tournament
- Season: 1942–43
- Champions: Akademisk Boldklub

Statistics of Danish War Tournament in the 1942/1943 season.

== Series 1 ==
Pos	Team	Pld	W	D	L	GF	GA	GD	Pts
1	Esbjerg fB	18	11	2	5	47	36	+11	24
2	Aarhus Gymnastikforening	18	10	3	5	46	28	+18	23
3	Odense Boldklub	18	10	3	5	52	42	+10	23
4	Boldklubben 1909	18	8	3	7	40	38	+2	19
5	Aalborg Boldspilklub	18	9	1	8	28	31	−3	19
6	Vejle Boldklub	18	8	1	9	52	41	+11	17
7	Aalborg Chang	18	7	3	8	38	40	−2	17
8	Boldklubben 1913	18	6	2	10	30	43	−13	14
9	Vejen SF	18	6	1	11	38	56	−18	13
10	Randers Sportsklub Freja	18	4	3	11	29	45	−16	11

== Series 2 ==
Pos	Team	Pld	W	D	L	GF	GA	GD	Pts
1	KFUM	18	12	2	4	47	21	+26	26
2	Hellerup IK	18	10	5	3	53	24	+29	25
3	Nakskov	18	11	3	4	48	25	+23	25
4	Boldklubben 1908	18	9	3	6	40	29	+11	21
5	Korsør Boldklub	18	8	5	5	36	33	+3	21
6	B 1901	18	8	1	9	40	35	+5	17
7	Slagelse B&I	18	7	2	9	49	57	−8	16
8	Helsingør IF	18	6	3	9	38	45	−7	15
9	Dragør Boldklub	18	6	2	10	41	49	−8	14
10	Toreby-Grænge BK	18	0	0	18	12	86	−74	0

== Series 3 ==
Pos	Team	Pld	W	D	L	GF	GA	GD	Pts
1	Akademisk Boldklub	14	8	4	2	50	26	+24	20
2	Kjøbenhavns Boldklub	14	9	2	3	41	32	+9	20
3	Køge BK	14	6	5	3	39	25	+14	17
4	Boldklubben Frem	14	7	3	4	40	28	+12	17
5	Boldklubben af 1893	14	7	3	4	34	26	+8	17
6	Fremad Amager	14	3	3	8	21	33	−12	9
7	Boldklubben 1903	14	2	2	10	24	53	−29	6
8	Østerbros Boldklub	14	2	2	10	19	45	−26	6

== Quarterfinals ==
- Hobro IK 0-4 Kjøbenhavns Boldklub
- Esbjerg fB 3-2 Køge BK
- KFUM 0-1 Akademisk Boldklub
- Aarhus Gymnastikforening 1-1 Boldklubben Frem
  - Aarhus Gymnastikforening was awarded winner by lot.

== Semifinals ==
- Kjøbenhavns Boldklub 2-0 Aarhus Gymnastikforening
- Akademisk Boldklub 6-1 Esbjerg fB

== Final ==
- Kjøbenhavns Boldklub 1-2 Akademisk Boldklub
