= Carl Henrik Clemmensen =

Danish newspaper editor

- Born: 28 March 1901; Copenhagen, Denmark
- Died: 30 or 31 August 1943 (aged 42); Lundtofte, Denmark
- Cause of death: Murder
- Resting place: Ordrup Cemetery next to his brother Niels Clemmensen
- Education: Cand. Phil.
- Occupations: Journalist and editor
- Known for: Murdered for anti-Nazi sentiment
- Spouses: Karen Clemmensen (previous marriage); Elsebeth née Jørgensen (married until 1943)
- Parent(s): Christian Albert Clemmensen and Fanny née Greibe

Carl Henrik Clemmensen (28 March 1901 – 30 or 31 August 1943) was a Danish newspaper editor who was killed by three men of the Schalburg Corps, including Flemming Helweg-Larsen and Søren Kam.

== Biography ==
Clemmensen was born in Copenhagen as the younger brother of Niels Clemmensen and as son of journalist Cand. Phil. Christian Albert Clemmensen and wife Fanny née Greibe.

In addition to being a newspaper editor he wrote part of the manuscript for the 1944 comedy De tre skolekammerater.

On 30 August 1943 Clemmensen insulted chief editor of the pro-Nazi publication Fædrelandet Poul Nordahl-Petersen. On the same evening or after midnight Clemmensen was gunned down in Lundtofte, next to Lundtofte Airfield by three different pistols firing eight bullets all impacting his head and upper body while he was standing. His body was found the next morning and quickly identified.

Clemmensen was survived by two children, his 13-year-old daughter Mona and his newborn son Peter Winston Clemmensen.

== After his death ==
On 4 September 1943 Clemmensen was buried at Ordrup Cemetery.

The September 1943 issue of De frie Danske proclaimed Flemming Helweg-Larsen and Søren Kam as Schalburg-bandits and his murderers.

After the liberation a police investigation pointed to Flemming Helweg-Larsen and Søren Kam as well as a third SS-man Jørgen Valdemar Bitsch as the murderers. Flemming Helweg-Larsen was put on trial and executed, while Jørgen Valdemar Bitsch disappeared and Søren Kam died in 2015 without ever having stood trial for the murder.

In 2004 a grandson of Clemmensen Søren Fauli produced the documentary Min morfars morder (My grandfather's murderer) in which the daughter Mona appears and in which Søren Kam is interviewed by Fauli.
