= Flemming Helweg-Larsen =

Danish murderer (1911–1946)

- Born: 20 July 1911; St. Croix, Danish West Indies
- Died: 5 January 1946 (aged 34); Copenhagen, Denmark
- Cause of death: Execution by firing squad
- Occupations: Writer, translator, ranch hand, soldier

Flemming Helweg-Larsen (20 July 1911 – 5 January 1946) was a Danish man convicted of the murder of Carl Henrik Clemmensen. He was subsequently executed in the first application of capital punishment in Denmark in 54 years.

== Biography ==
Born on St. Croix to the governor of the Danish West Indies, Helweg-Larsen has been described as having an adventurous spirit with "remarkable wordcrafting abilities". In the 1930s he traveled to Argentina. During this trip to South America, Helweg-Larsen worked for three years as a ranch hand. During the same decade, his political interests began to drift into alignment with fascism, though he never joined the National Socialist Workers' Party of Denmark. In the early 1940s he produced a Danish translation of the Ernest Hemingway novella The Torrents of Spring, which was published by Thaning & Appel in 1941 and which was used as the basis for a second Danish translation of the work in 1960.

Following the German occupation of Denmark, Helweg-Larsen joined the Waffen SS, in which he served with a "propaganda unit in the Arnhem area to fire off material at British troops". In 1943, Helweg-Larsen, Søren Kam, and a third Danish man, seized Carl Henrik Clemmensen – a Danish "anti-Nazi newspaper editor" – from his home. Clemmensen's body was later found "riddled with bullets". Following the war, Helweg-Larsen was convicted of the murder and executed by firing squad.

While being held in prison during trial, Helweg-Larsen wrote a memoir of his life during the period of 1941 to 1945. It was published by Gyldendal in 2008 under the title Dødsdømt: Flemming Helweg-Larsens beretning ("Death Sentence: Flemming Helweg-Larsen's Account"). In a review of the book, Berlingske concluded it was well-written and an "exciting reading".
