= Nyhavn 67 =

Residential building in Copenhagen, Denmark

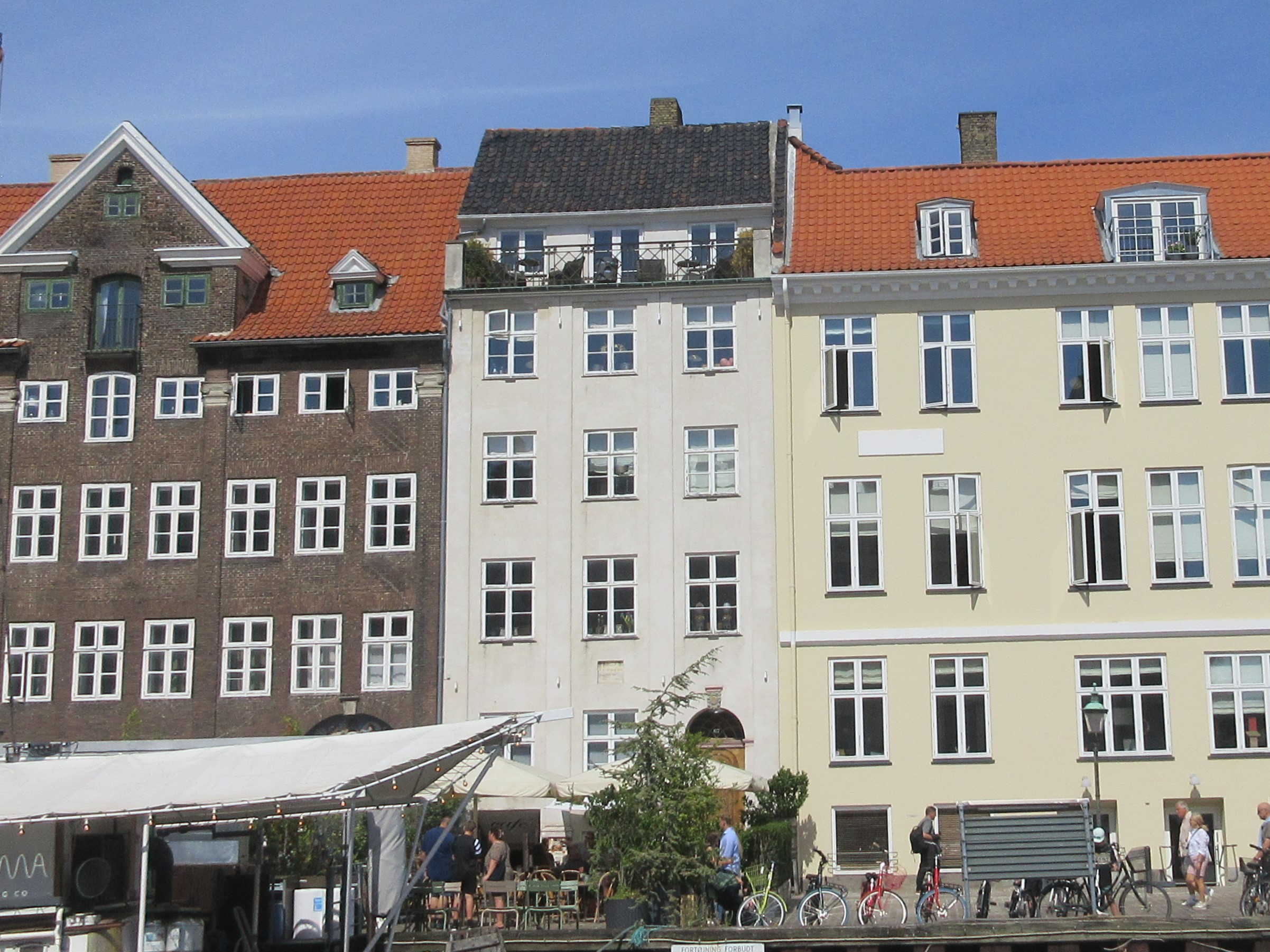
- Nyhavn 67 in August 2024

General information
- Location: Copenhagen, Denmark
- Coordinates: 55°40′46.29″N 12°35′34.43″E
- Completed: 1838

Nyhavn 67 is a listed property overlooking the Nyhavn Canal in central Copenhagen, Denmark. The writer Hans Christian Andersen lived in the building from 1848 to 1865.

== Architecture ==
The house consists of five floors over a high cellar and is just three bays wide. The keystone above the main entrance features the name "1737" and the initials of the building's first owner.

== Gallery ==
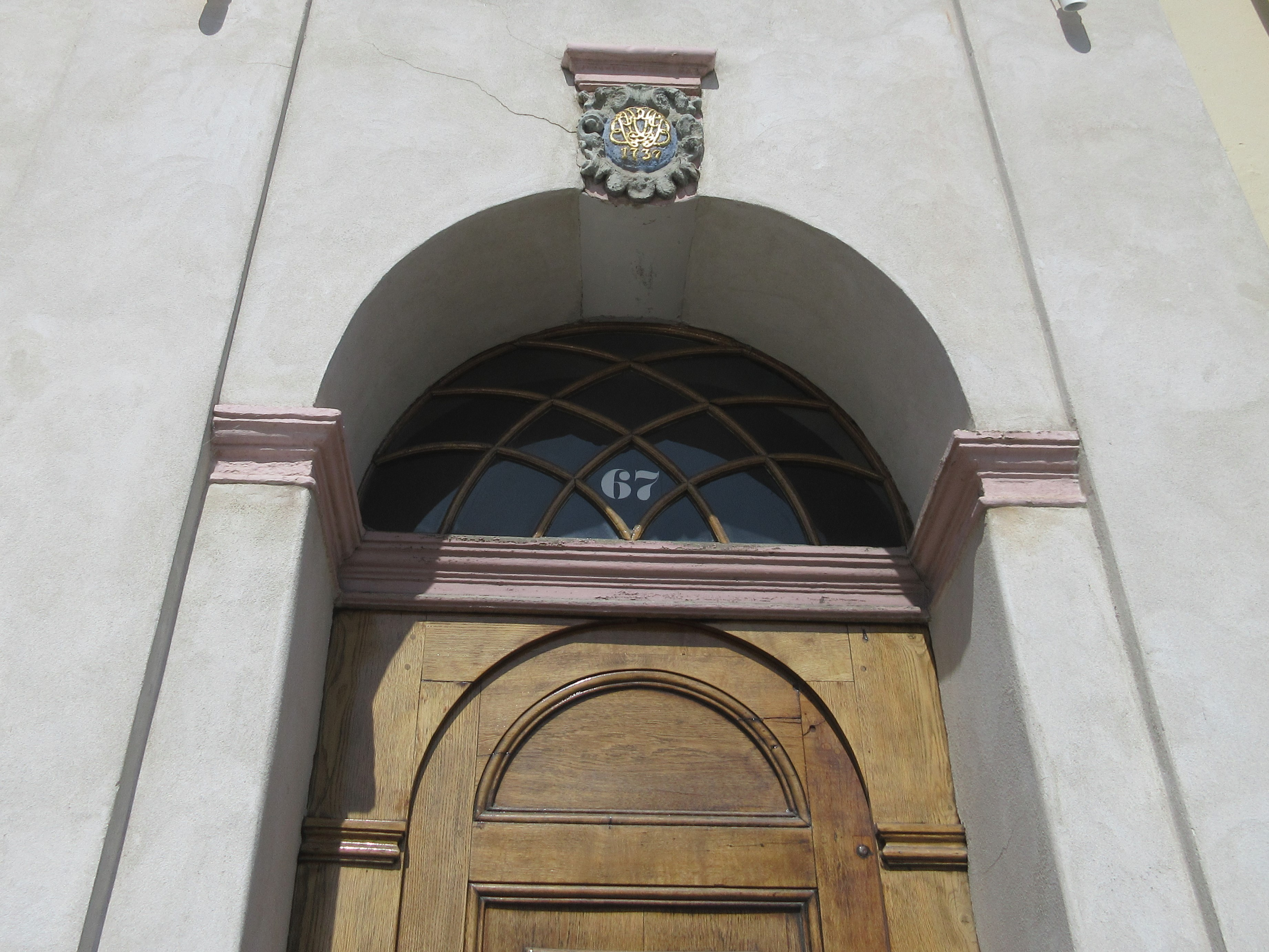
The window above the main entrance

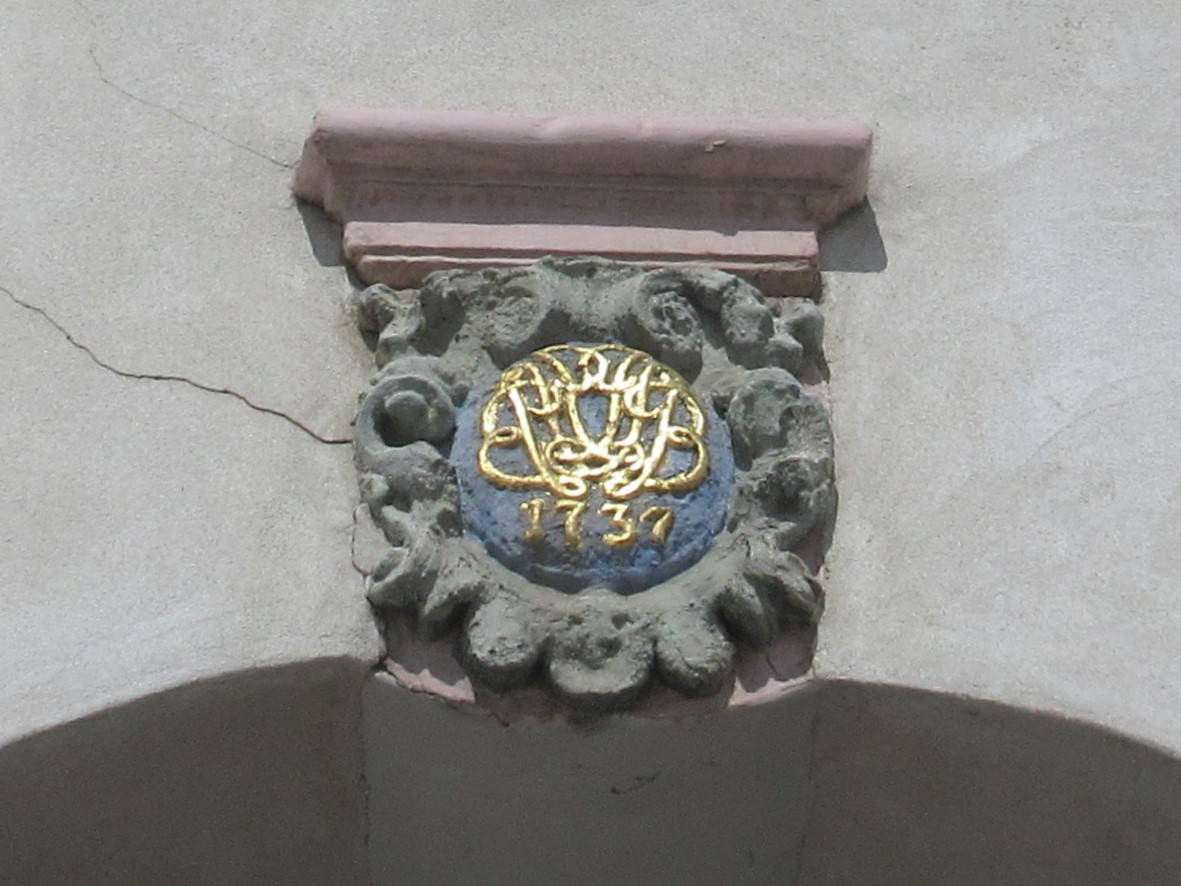
Close-up of the keystone

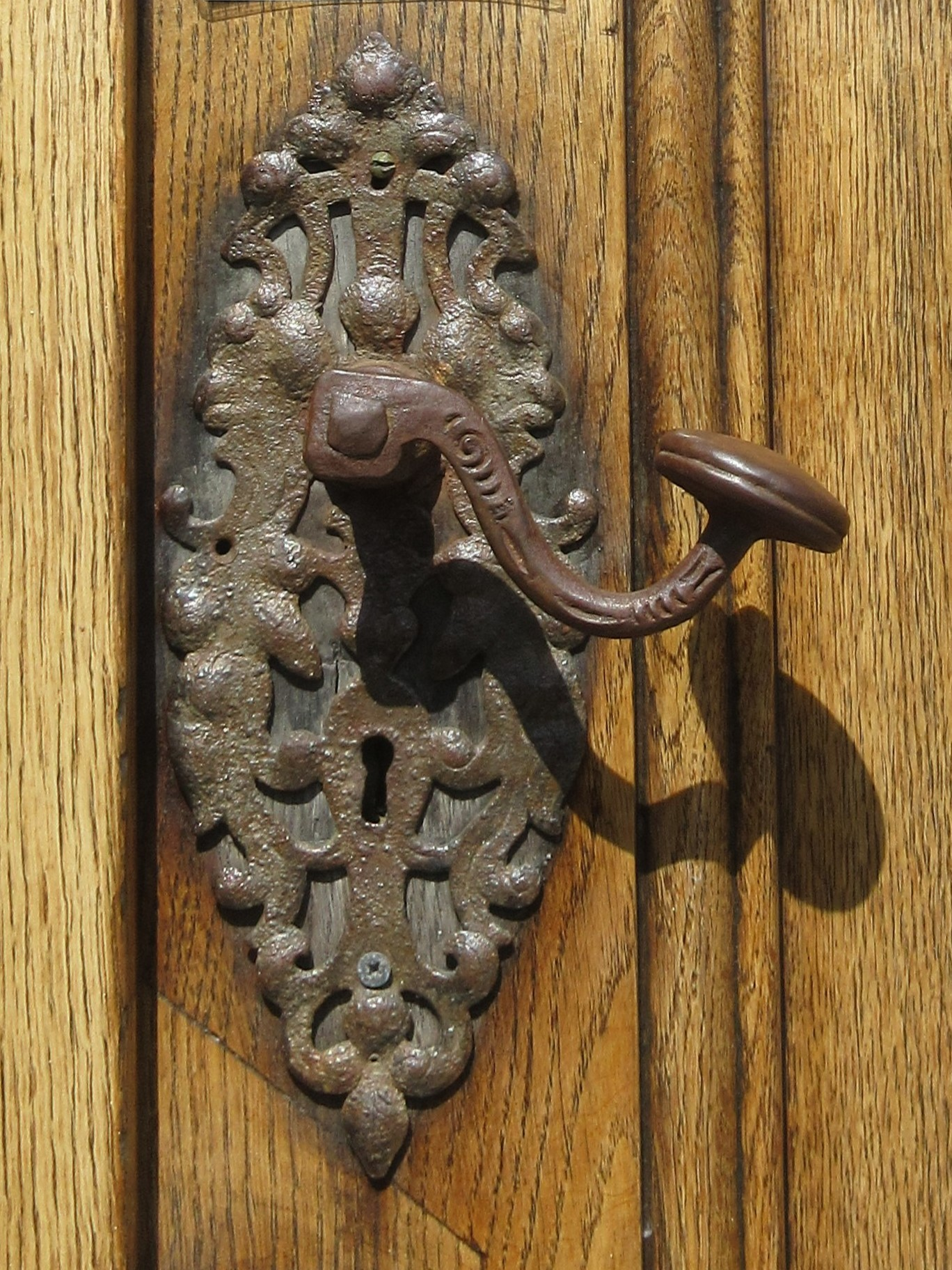
