= Niels Clemmensen =

Danish musician

Niels Clemmensen (1900–1950) was a Danish pianist and composer. He was the son of C. A. Clemmensen and the brother of Carl Henrik Clemmensen.

== Notable works ==
- Fra Kap til Kronborg (1930)
- Den er fin med kompasset (1930)
- Tjin-Tjin-Juanita (1930)
- Union Jack (1931)
- Paustians ur (1932)
- Katinka, Katinka (1936)
- Søren Bramfris lærkesang (1940)
- De tre skolekammerater (1944).
- 14 mand og Hera
- Rimonde
- To hvide liljer og en knækket søjle
- Med Kronborg om Styrbord igen
