= Margrethe Agger =

Danish textile artist (born 1943)

Margrethe Winkel Agger (born 13 August 1943) is a Danish textile artist, tapestry weaver and graphic designer. After a study trip to Mexico, she gained success in 1977 after exhibiting 26 works at the Danish Design Museum. From 1977 to 1994, she was an instructor at the Danish Handicraft Guild until 1994 and has also taught at the Albertslund Art School. Her recent tapestries express nature and animals in her own colourful narrative style. She is particularly active in Odsherred where she has lived since 1985. A member of many art organizations, in 1998 she was a co-founder of Dansk Gobelinkunst, a tapestry weaving association which has brought international recognition to Danish weavers.

== Early life and family ==
Born on 13 August 1943 in Copenhagen, Margrethe Winkel Agger is the daughter of Henry Winkel Agger (1904–89), a lecturer in pharmacology, and his wife Johanne Steenstrup née Rønne (1907–74), a schoolteacher. When she was 19, she studied textile art at Copenhagen's Arts and Crafts School, graduating in 1966. In 1965, she married the ethnographer Christian Heilskov Rasmussen with whom she had a daughter Annika (1965). The marriage was dissolved in 1977. In 1996, she married the ethnologist Karsten Lægdsmand.

== Career ==
While still a student, Agger gained useful practical experience when working as an intern with Astrid and Norbert Kahn who created tapestries and woven hangings for churches. After her daughter was born, to help with the family's income, she worked as a cleaner and later as a teacher. In 1968, an exhibition of Polish weaving in Lyngby inspired her to develop an interest in figurative weaving which was not yet common in Denmark.

As a result of a trip to Mexico (1975–76) where she was impressed by the simple but striking work of Hustec artists, Agger began to work more freely. Moving in the direction of fantasy and making more imaginative use of strong colour, in 1977 she received significant recognition from an exhibition of the pictorial works she had woven for an exhibition at the Danish Museum of Art and Design. Thereafter she was able to make a living from selling her creations and giving increasingly popular courses throughout Denmark. Frequently based on the sketches she made while travelling through the Nordic countries, her works became increasing colourful, depicting figures, flowers, animals or ornaments. Completed in manageable sizes, they sold well.

In 1998, Agger contributed to the founding of Dansk Gobelinkunst which has led to wide recognition of Danish tapestry and those who design and create them.
