= Nyhavn =

Street, canal and district in Copenhagen

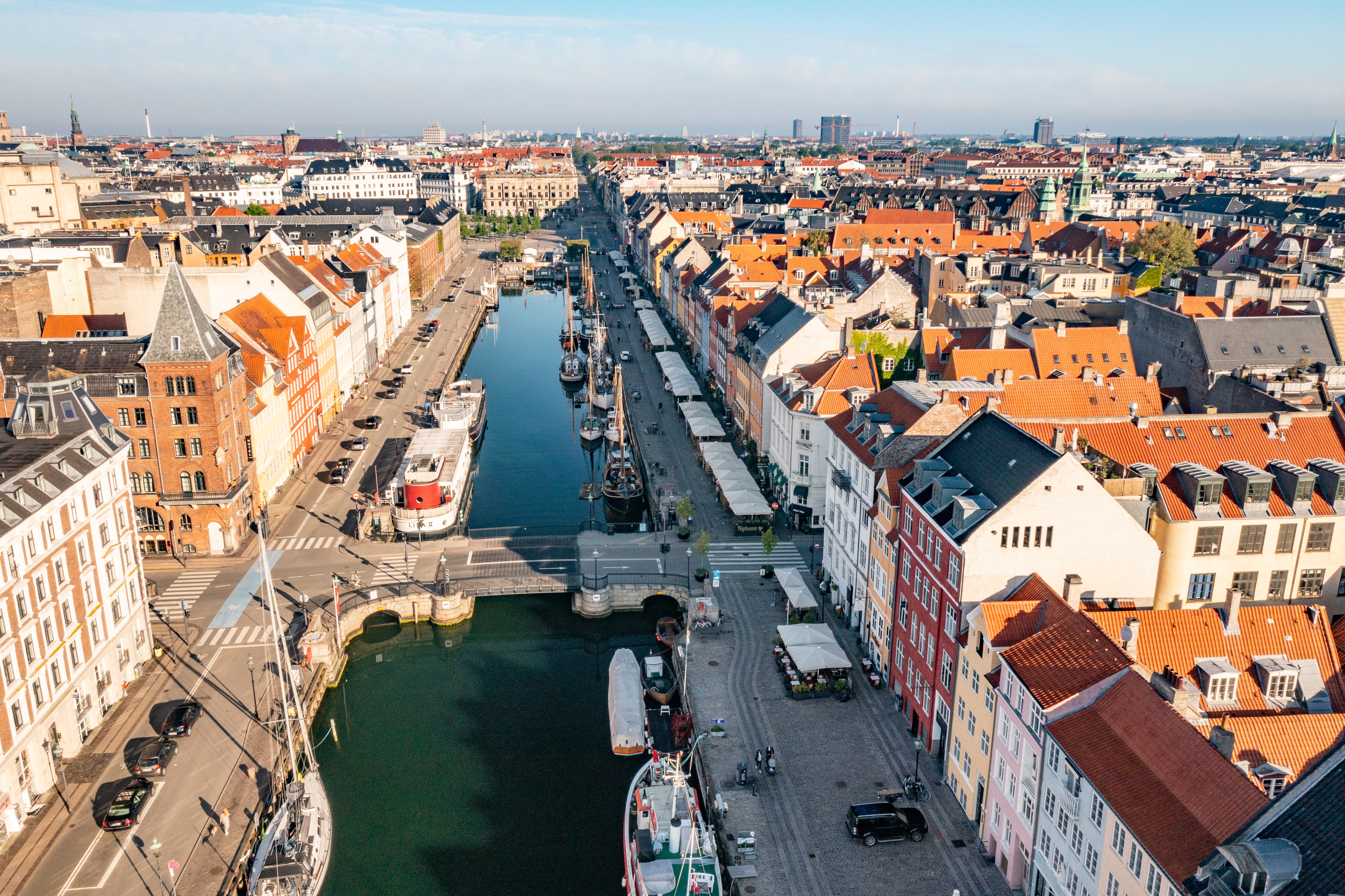
- Nyhavn in May 2021
- Interactive map of Nyhavn
- Length: 450 m (1,480 ft)
- Location: Indre By, Copenhagen, Denmark
- Postal code: 1051
- Nearest metro station: Kongens Nytorv
- Coordinates: 55°40′47″N 12°35′26″E

Nyhavn (Danish pronunciation: [ˈnyˌhɑwˀn]; New Haven) is a 17th-century waterfront, canal and entertainment district in Copenhagen, Denmark. Stretching from Kongens Nytorv to the Inner Harbour just south of the Royal Playhouse, it is lined by brightly coloured 17th and early 18th century townhouses and bars, cafes and restaurants. The canal harbours many historical wooden ships.

== History ==
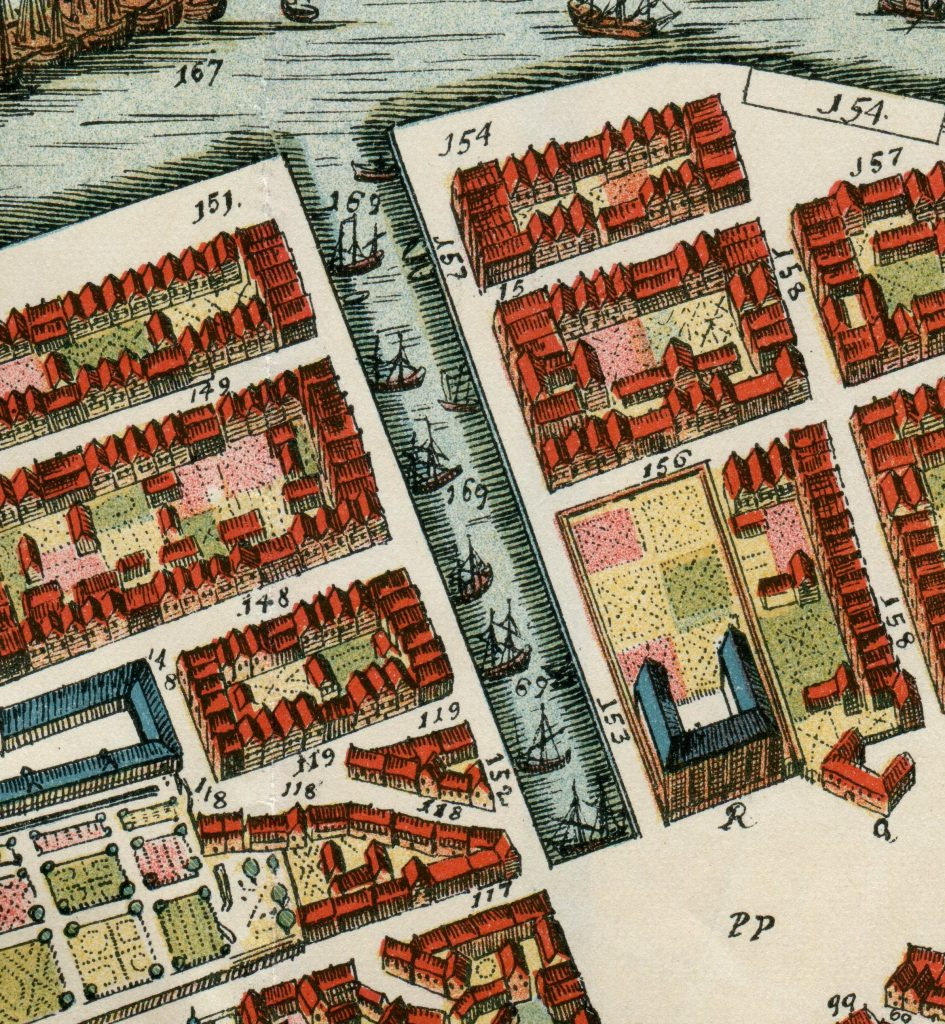
Nyhavn seen on a detail from Rosen's Map of Copenhagen, 1674

Nyhavn was constructed by King Christian V from 1670 to 1675, dug by Danish soldiers and Swedish prisoners of war from the Dano-Swedish War 1658–1660. It is a gateway from the sea to the old inner city at Kongens Nytorv (King's Square), where ships handled cargo and fishermens' catch. It was notorious for beer, sailors, and prostitution. Danish author Hans Christian Andersen lived at Nyhavn for 18 years.

The first bridge across Nyhavn opened in 1874. It was a temporary wooden footbridge. It was replaced by the current bridge in 1912.

As ocean-going ships grew larger, Nyhavn was taken over by internal Danish small vessel freight traffic. After World War II land transport took over this role and small vessel traffic disappeared from the Port of Copenhagen, leaving Nyhavn largely deserted of ships.

In the mid-1960s, the Nyhavn Society (Danish: Nyhavnsforeningen) was founded with the aim of revitalising the area. In 1977, Nyhavn was inaugurated as a veteran ship and museum harbour by Copenhagen's Lord Mayor Egon Weidekamp. In 1980 Nyhavn quay was pedestrianised; it had been used as a parking area in the previous years which had coincided with a dwindling of harbour activities. Since then it has become a popular spot for tourists and locals alike, serving the function of a square according to architects Jan Gehl and Lars Gemzøe.

== Buildings ==
The northern side of Nyhavn is lined by brightly coloured townhouses built with wood, bricks, and plaster. The oldest house, at No. 9, dates from 1681.

Between 1845 and 1864, Hans Christian Andersen lived at No. 67, where a memorial plaque now stands. From 1871 to 1875 Andersen lived at Nyhavn 18, which currently houses an Andersen-themed souvenir shop.

The southern side of Nyhavn has lavish mansions lining the canal, including Charlottenborg Palace at the corner of Kongens Nytorv.

== Veteran Ship and Museum Harbour ==
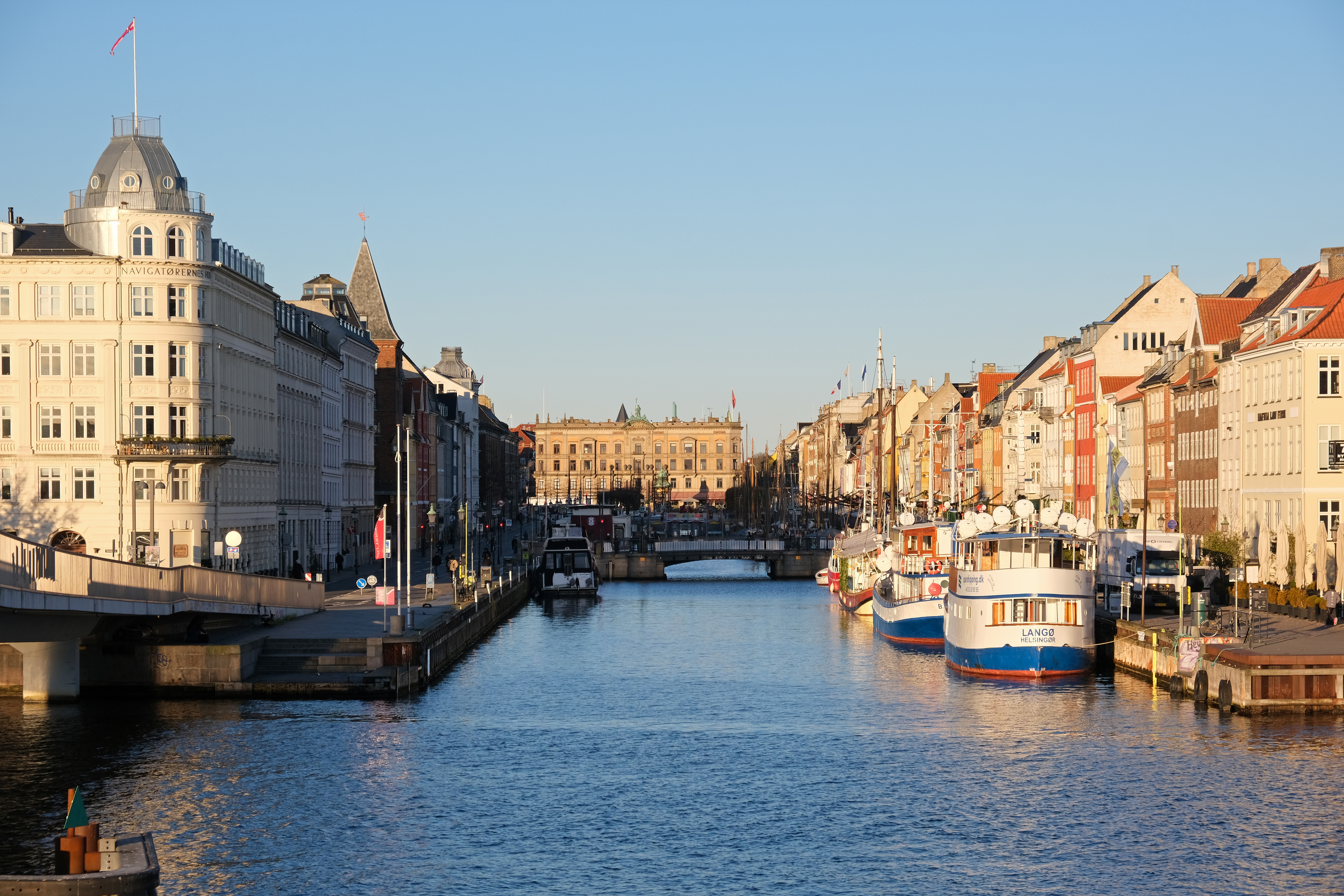
Nyhavn waterfront seen from Inner Harbour

Nyhavn Veteran Ship and Museum Harbour, occupying the inner section of Nyhavn, between the Nyhavn Bridge and Kongens Nytorv, is lined with old ships. From the foundation of the heritage harbour in 1977, the south side of the canal has been reserved for museum ships owned by the Danish National Museum, which received a donation of carefully restored ships from A. P. Møller, while the northern side of the canal was put at the disposal of the Nyhavn Society and privately owned, still usable wooden ships. Harbor ships include:

- Lightvessel XVII Gedser Rev – lightvessel built in Odense in 1895, in operation until 1972, then acquired by the National Museum and now serving as a museum ship.
- Svalan af Nyhavn – galleass built in Jungfrusund in 1924
- Anna Møller – galleass built in Randers in 1906
- MA-RI – purpose-built smuggling ship built in 1920; boarded by custom authorities off Elsinore with smuggling goods aboard in 1923, then confiscated and sold on auction, then operated both as a fishing vessel and as a ferry between Poland and Bornholm, again as a smuggling vessel.
- Mira – two-masted schooner built in Fåborg in 1898, considered one of the finest ships of the Danish small vessel traffic of the time. For many years it transported chalk from Stevns. The first ship on the north side of Nyhavn, coming from Kongens Nytorv.
- The Boat Theatre - a lighter-type barge built in Copenhagen in 1898, since 1972 operated as a theatre boat.

== The Memorial Anchor ==
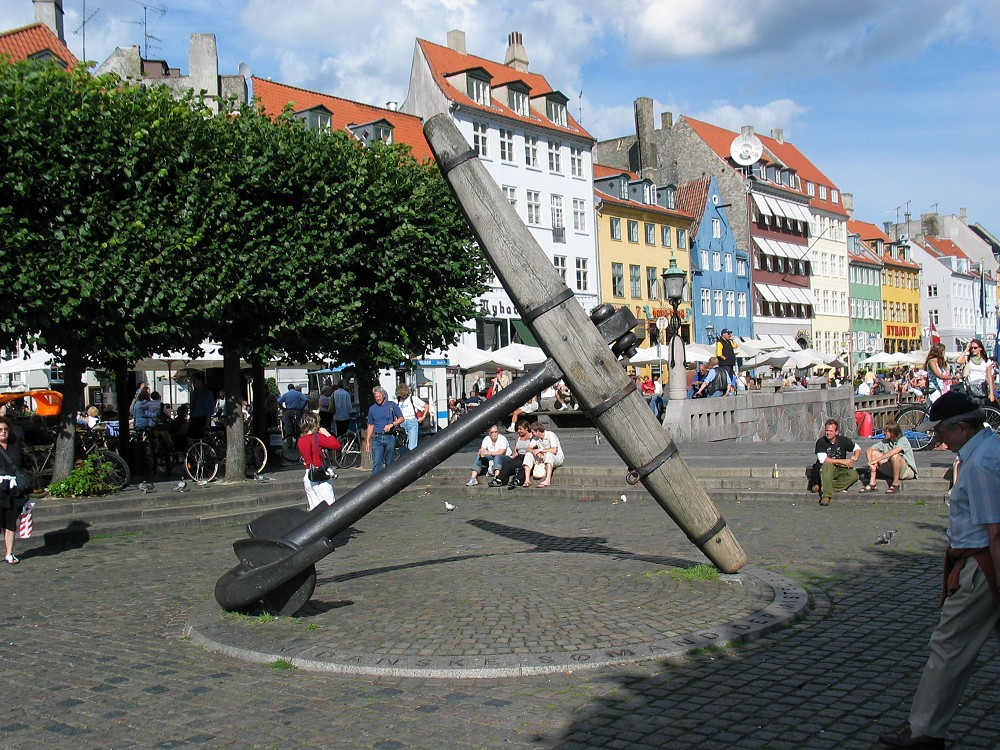
The Memorial Anchor at the end of Nyhavn

The great Memorial Anchor (Danish: Mindeankeret) at the end of Nyhavn, where it meets Kongens Nytorv, is a monument commemorating the more than 1,700 Danish officers and sailors in service for the Navy, merchant fleet or Allied Forces, who sacrificed their lives during World War II. The Anchor was inaugurated in 1951, replacing a temporary wooden cross erected on the spot in 1945, and has a plaque with a monogram of King Frederik VII on it. The Memorial Anchor is from 1872 and was used on the Frigate Fyn (Funen), which was docked at Holmen Naval Base during the Second World War. Every year on May 5 – Denmark's Liberation day 1945 – an official ceremony is held to honour and commemorate the fallen at the Memorial Anchor.

== Bars and restaurants ==
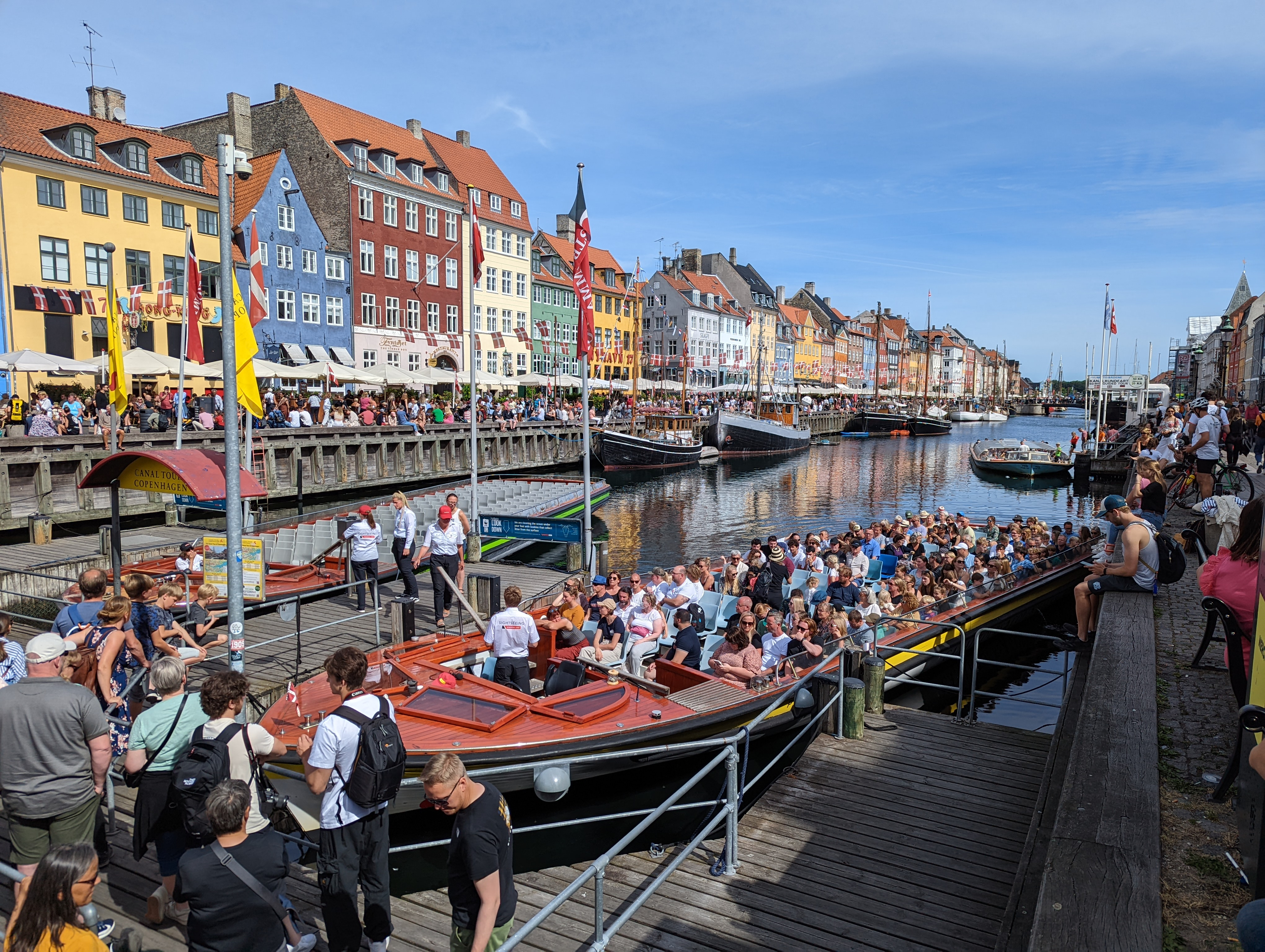
Nyhavn in August, awash with tourists

Along its northern, sunnier side, Nyhavn is lined with many bars and restaurants facing the harbor. Nyhavn serves as a hub of canal tours, but it can be chilly.

== Transport ==
Kongens Nytorv metro station is located at the end of Nyhavn, though situated at the far end of the namesake square outside Magasin du Nord. The station is served by all four lines of the Copenhagen Metro.

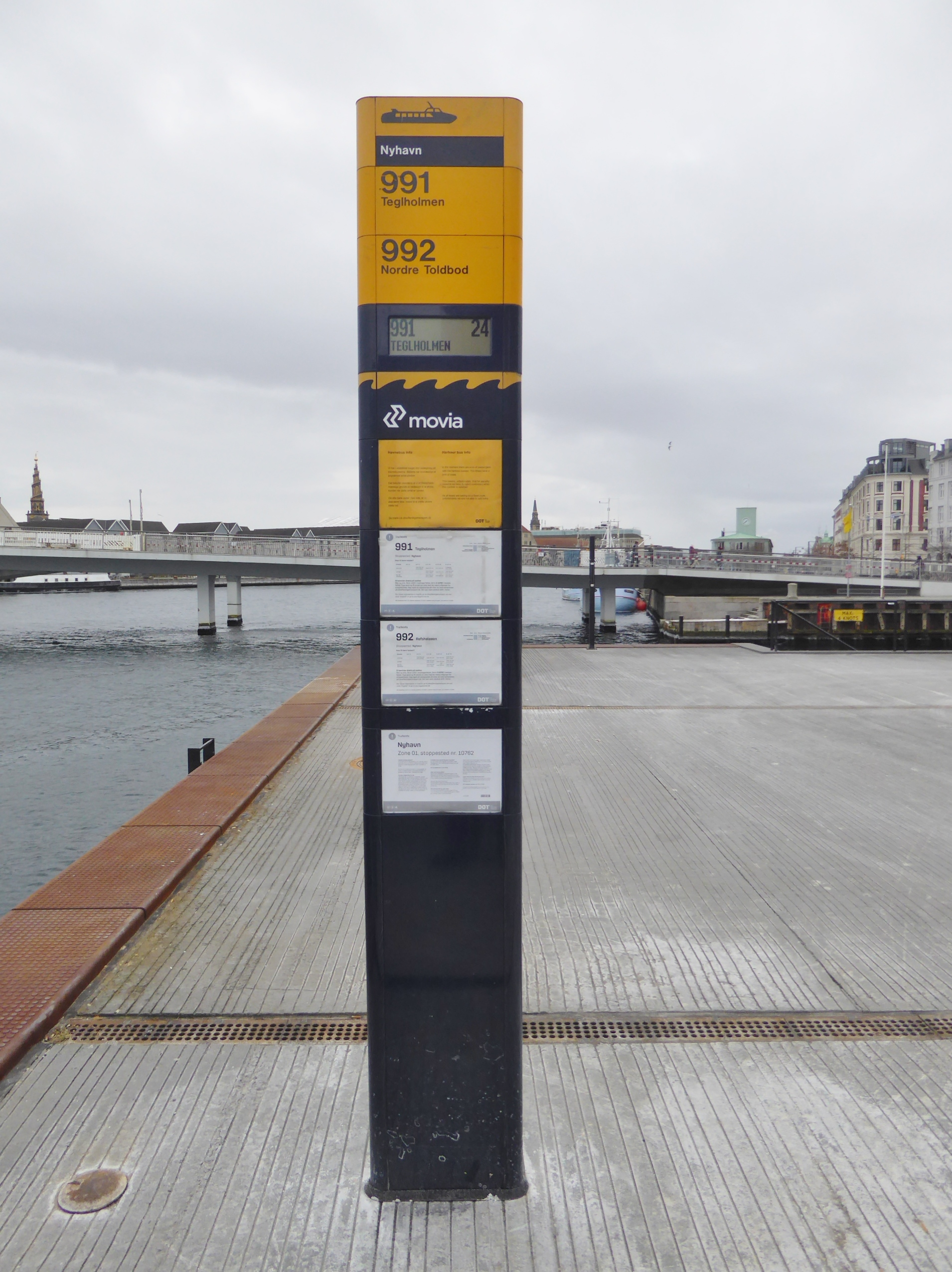
Harbour bus stop Nyhavn

The Copenhagen Harbour Buses has a stop at the mouth of Nyhavn. All four routes of the harbour buses, Routes 901, 902, 903 and 904, stop at the bus stop next to the Royal Playhouse.

In 2016 the Inner Harbor Bridge (Inderhavnsbro) connecting Nyhavn and Christianshavn was opened after years of setbacks and delays. The 180 m cycling and pedestrian drawbridge has been nicknamed the Kissing Bridge because its contour resembles two tongues meeting.

== Cultural references ==
=== Film ===
- Nyhavn has been seen in numerous Danish films. It is for instance used as a location in a number of Olsen-banden films, for instance at 0:25:44 in The Olsen Gang on the Track and at 0:28:56 in the 1977 Olsen Gang film The Olsen Gang Outta Sight. The Memorial Anchor is seen at 1:16:57 in The Olsen Gang Sees Red.

Nyhavn has also been featured in a number of international films.

- The closing scenes of Ingmar Bergman's A Lesson in Love takes place in Nyhavn.
- In the 1957 British-American action film Hidden Fear, Nyhavn is used as a central location.
- In the 1963 German film The Lightship, Nyhavn is used as a location in spite of the fact that the film is set in Germany.
- In the 1966 Alfred Hitchcock spy film Torn Curtain, Armstrong (Paul Newman), who is on the way to DDR, is told to contact a used book seller at Kanalgade 1 which later turns out to be Nyhavn when his fiancée (Julie Andrews) visits the address.
- In the 2015 drama film The Danish Girl, Nyhavn is the location where Einar (Eddie Redmayne) and Gerda (Alicia Vikander) live, and it is also where Lili makes her first forays in public. Nyhavn is in the film presented as a fish market while Copenhagen's historic fish market was in fact located at Gammel Strand.

=== Literature ===
- Elisabeth Levy's 1997 novel Et dukkehus i Nyhavn (A Doll House in Nyhavn) describes a young girls life in Nyhavn in 1929.
- Anne Marie Ejrnæs's 2002 biographical novel Som Svalen (Like the Swallow) about Thomasine Gyllenbourg begins when she is eight years old and lives in her father's home at Nyhavn 67.
- Karin Michaëlis's 1936 children's book Lotte Ligeglad is about a girl who lives in Nyhavn where her mother owns a shop next to a tavern.

The poet Tom Kristensen spent part of his childhood in Lille Strandstræde. In his 1922 poem Nyhavns-Odyssé, (Nyhavn Odyssey), he describes the adolescent boy's encounter with the colourful street in which he meets the counterparts of many in many of the characters from Homer's Odyssey.

=== Music ===
- Nu går våren gennem Nyhavn is a song by Sigfred Pedersen with melody by Niels Clemmensen.
- Sigfred Petersen's "Nyhavn poems"—Katinka, Katinka, Søren Bramfris Lærkesang and Nyhavnsnætter—have all been scored by Niels Clemmesen. He lived at Nyhavn 17 from 1928.

== See also ==
- Tourism in Denmark
