= Holger Pedersen (astronomer) =

Danish astronomer (born 1946)

Holger Pedersen (born 3 November 1946), Emeritus at the Niels Bohr Institute is a Danish astronomer at the European Southern Observatory. He specialises in gamma-ray bursts, meteorites and minor planets.

Asteroids 9266 Holger and 3312 Pedersen are named after him.

== Amateur archaeology ==
In his earlier years, Pedersen was a keen amateur archaeologist on the Danish island of Funen. In this capacity, in 1985 as a gift to the Odense City Museums 125 year jubilee, he donated a sum of money for the creation of a legate for education of fellow amateur archaeologists.

== 2015 Discovery of astronomical photographs ==
In 2015 Pedersen discovered a collection in the archives of the Bohr Institute of more than 150 photographic plates of astronomical observations, shot from 1895 to 1957. The glass plates were well preserved and clear shots of lunar eclipses, the stellar constellations and the passing of the 1957 Comet Arend–Roland. Pedersen called the find exciting, as per their being archaeoastronomy, showing how humans saw the sky a century ago. Especially interesting among the plates in the collection is a rare copy of a plate of a solar eclipse shot in 1919 by English astronomer Arthur Eddington. This eclipse event helped prove Einstein's theory of general relativity.
