= 1838 in Denmark =

- Decades: 1810s; 1820s; 1830s; 1840s; 1850s
- See also: Other events of 1838; List of years in Denmark

Events from the year 1838 in Denmark.

== Incumbents ==
- Monarch – Frederick VI
- Prime minister – Otto Joachim

== Events ==
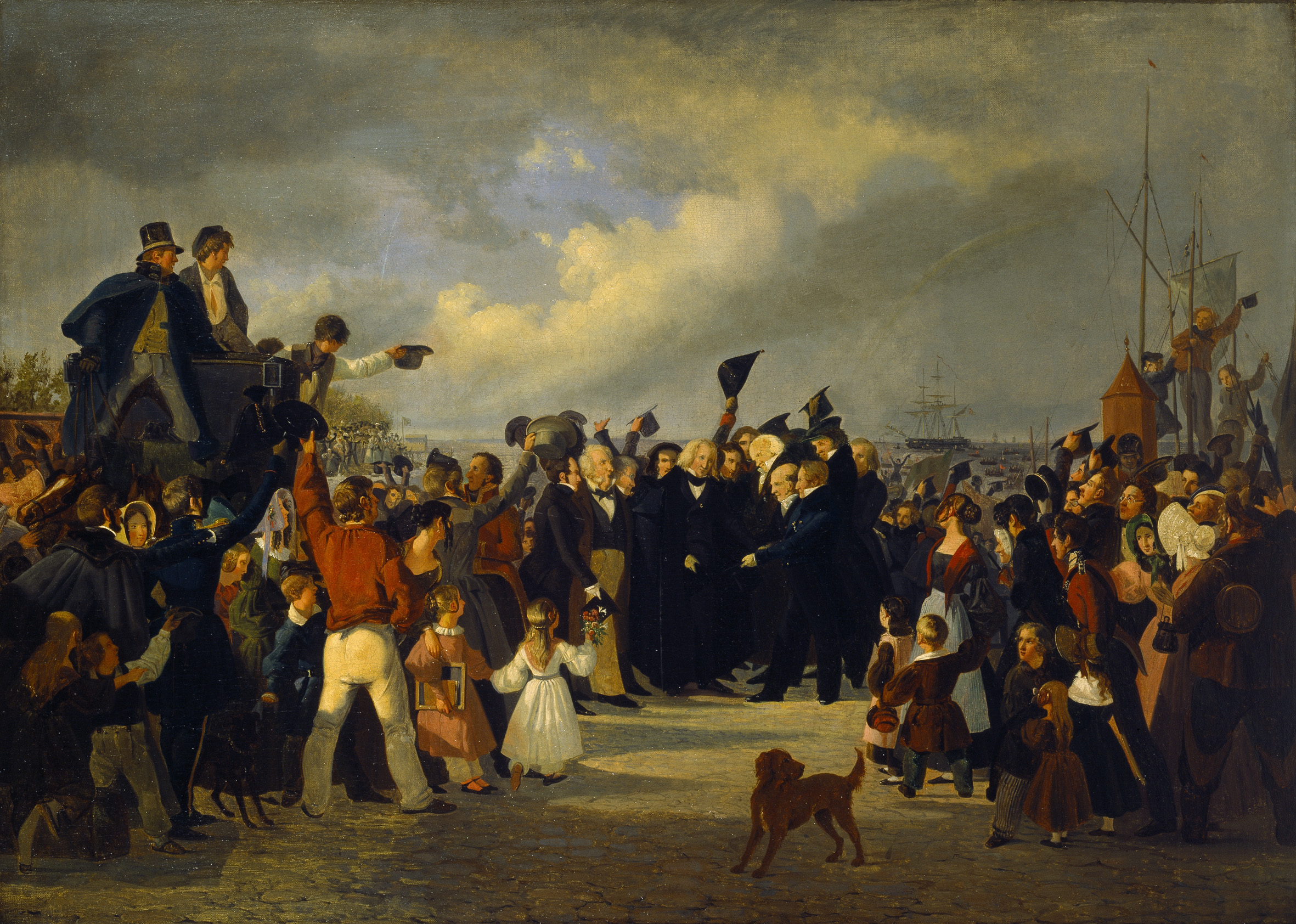
Bertel Thorvaldsen's reception in Copenhagen on 17 September. Painting by Fritz Westphal.

- 26 March – Denmark and Venezuela agree to sign a Treaty of Amity, Commerce, and Navigation.
- 17 September – After almost four decades in Rome, Bertel Thorvaldsen, accompanied by his art collections and most of his own works, returns to Copenhagen.

=== Undated ===
- Niverød Brickworks us established on the coast north of Copenhagen.l

== Births ==
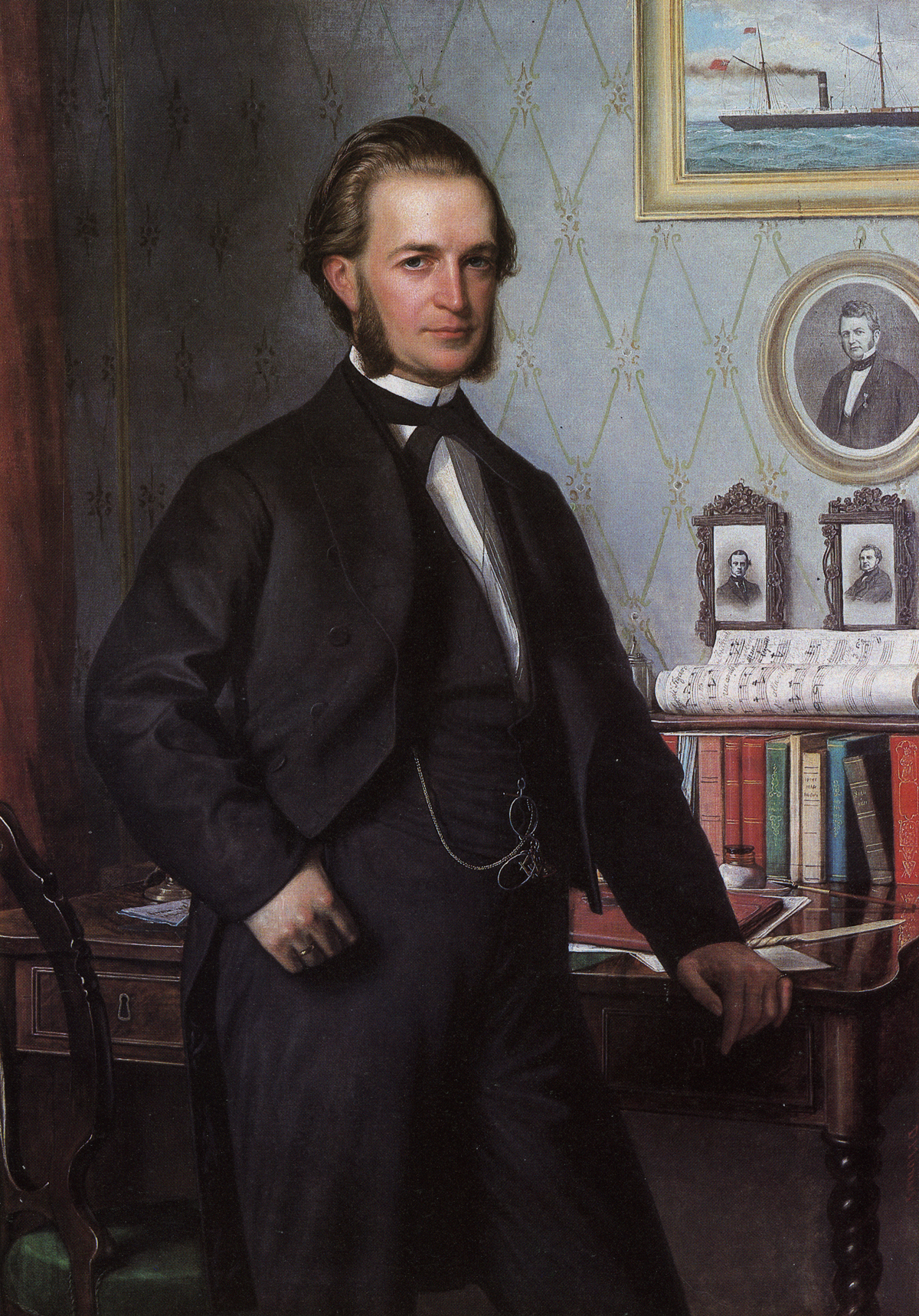
Johan Hansen.

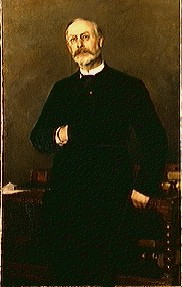
Philip Schou.

=== January–March ===
- 3 January – Rasmus Krag, military officer and engineer (born 1873 in Norway)
- 11 January – Ludvig Abelin Schou, painter (died 1907 in France)
- 1 February – Christian Blache, painter (died 1920)
- 6 February – Johan Hansen, businessman (died 1913)
- 22 February – Johan Peter Andreas Anker, military officer (died 1876)
- 28 February – Magda von Dolcke, actress (died 1926)

=== April–June ===
- 2 June – Charles Abrahams, architect (died 1893)
- 19 June – Julius Lange, art historian (died 1896)

=== July–September ===
- 1 July – Johanne Meyer, editor and activist (died 1915)
- 10 July – Philip Schou, businessman (died 1922)
- 16 July – Ejler Andreas Jorgensen, painter (died 1876)
- 31 July – Vilhelm Rosenstand, artist (died 1915)
- 12 September – Jacob Scavenius. landowner and politician (died 1915)

=== October–December ===
- 30 October – Christopher Peter Jürgensen, mechanician and instrument maker (died 1911)
- 23 November – Otto Mønsted, businessman (died 1916)
- 24 December – Thorvald N. Thiele, astronomer (died 1910)

== Deaths ==
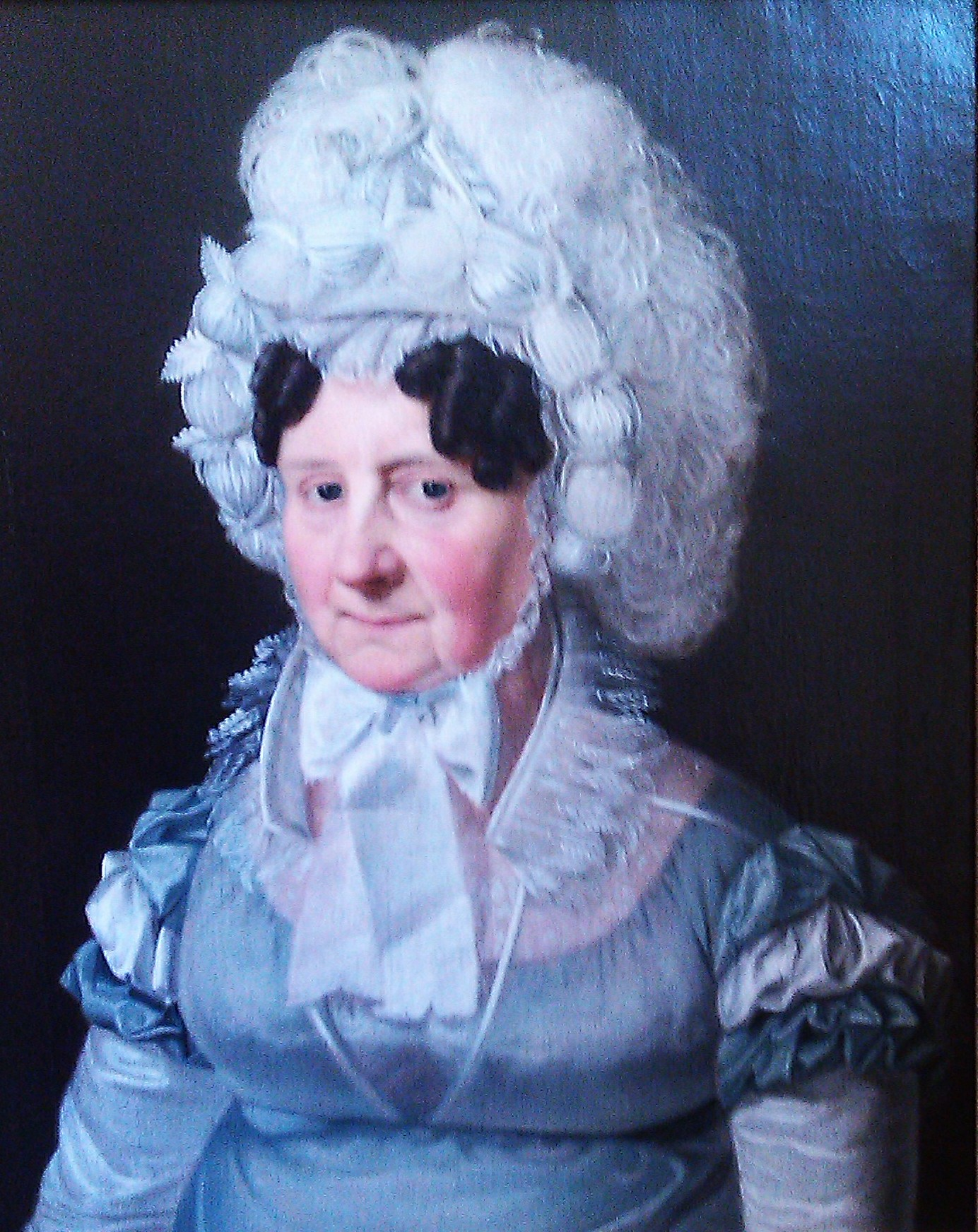
Marie Kofoed.

=== January–March ===
- 3 January – Rasmus Krag, military officer (born 1763 in Norway)
- 13 March – Poul Martin Møller, academic, writer, and poet (born 1794)

=== April–June ===
- 20 April – Marie Kofoed, businessperson and philanthropist (born 1760)

=== July–September ===
- 6 July – Frederik Christian Raben, count, traveller and amateur naturalist (born 1769)

=== October–December ===
- 21 October – Ove Ramel Sehested, statesman (born 1757 in Norway)

== Publications ==
- October – Hans Christian Andersen: Fairy Tales Told for Children. New Collection Vol I
