= List of magazines in Denmark =

In Denmark there are various magazines with different frequency types, including weekly magazines, monthly magazines and quarterly magazines. As in other Nordic countries, the national consumer organizations publish their magazines in Denmark. In 2007, there were nearly 68 consumer magazines in the country which were mostly owned by Danish media groups. Of them 52 were monthly/quarterly whereas 16 were weekly. These magazines were grouped into four main categories: general-interest magazines, opinion magazines, TV and radio guides, and professional and scientific magazines.

The following is an incomplete list of current and defunct magazines published in Denmark. They may be published in Danish or in other languages.

== 0-9 ==
- 7 TV-Dage

== A ==
- Aktuel Naturvidenskab
- Alt for Damerne
- Amine

== B ==
- Bast Magazine
- Berlingske Tidendes Nyhedsmagasin
- Billed Bladet
- Bionyt
- Bo Bedre
- Bolius
- Børsens Nyhedsmagasin

== C ==
- Corsaren
- Costume

== D ==
- Dansk
- Dansk Familieblad
- Den danske Spectator
- Det nye Danmark
- Dialog
- Divaani

== E ==
- Erhvervsbladet
- Euroman
- Eurowoman

== F ==
- Faklen
- Familie Journalen
- Femina
- Fjölnir
- Fødevaremagasinet
- Frit Danmark

== G ==
- Gaffa

== H ==
- Helhesten
- Helse
- Hendes Verden
- Heretica
- Historie
- Historisk Tidsskrift
- Hvad vi vil
- Hvedekorn

== I ==
- Idényt
- Illustreret Tidende
- Isabellas

== J ==
- Jodisk Familieblad

== K ==
- Kig Ind
- Klingen
- Kritik
- Kritisk Revy
- Kvinden & Samfundet

== L ==
- Lego Club Magazine
- Levende Billeder

== M ==
- MAK
- Mandag Morgen
- The Murmur

== O ==
- Økonomisk Ugebrev

== P ==
- Panorama in Interlingua
- pcplayer
- Penge og Privatøkonomi
- Pist Protta
- Politisk Revy
- Punch

== R ==
- Ravnen
- Rotary Norden

== S ==
- Science Illustrated
- Sirene
- Skorpionen
- Søndag
- Spor og Baner
- Svikmøllen

== T ==
- ta’
- Taarnet
- Tilskueren
- Tipsbladet

== U ==
- Ude og Hjemme
- Ugebladet Søndag
- Ugens Rapport

== V ==
- Vennen
- Verden og Vi
- Vi Unge
- Vindrosen

== See also ==
- List of newspapers in Denmark
