= 1876 in Denmark =

- Decades: 1850s; 1860s; 1870s; 1880s; 1890s
- See also: Other events of 1876; List of years in Denmark

Events from the year 1876 in Denmark.

== Incumbents ==
- Monarch – Christian IX
- Prime minister – J. B. S. Estrup

== Events ==
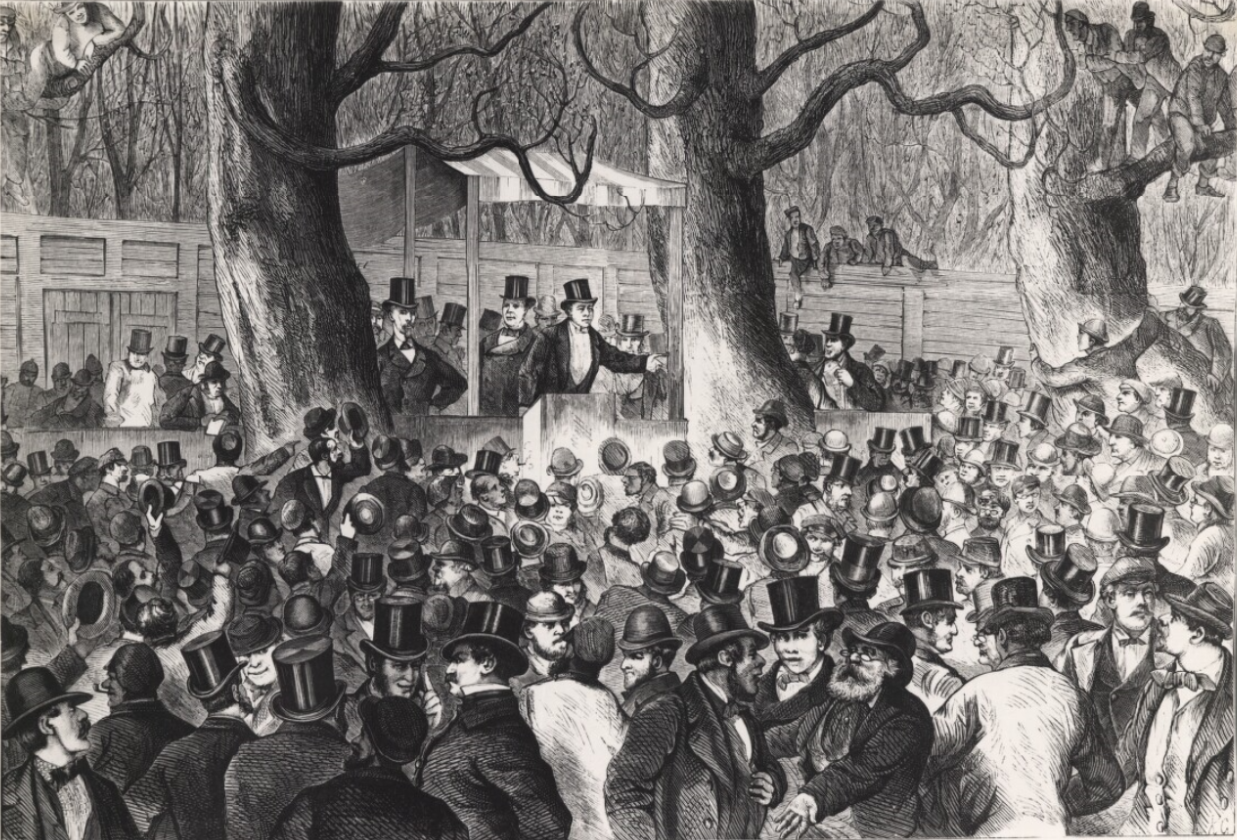
25 April: Election day at Rosenborg Drill Square in Copenhagen's 5th Constituency

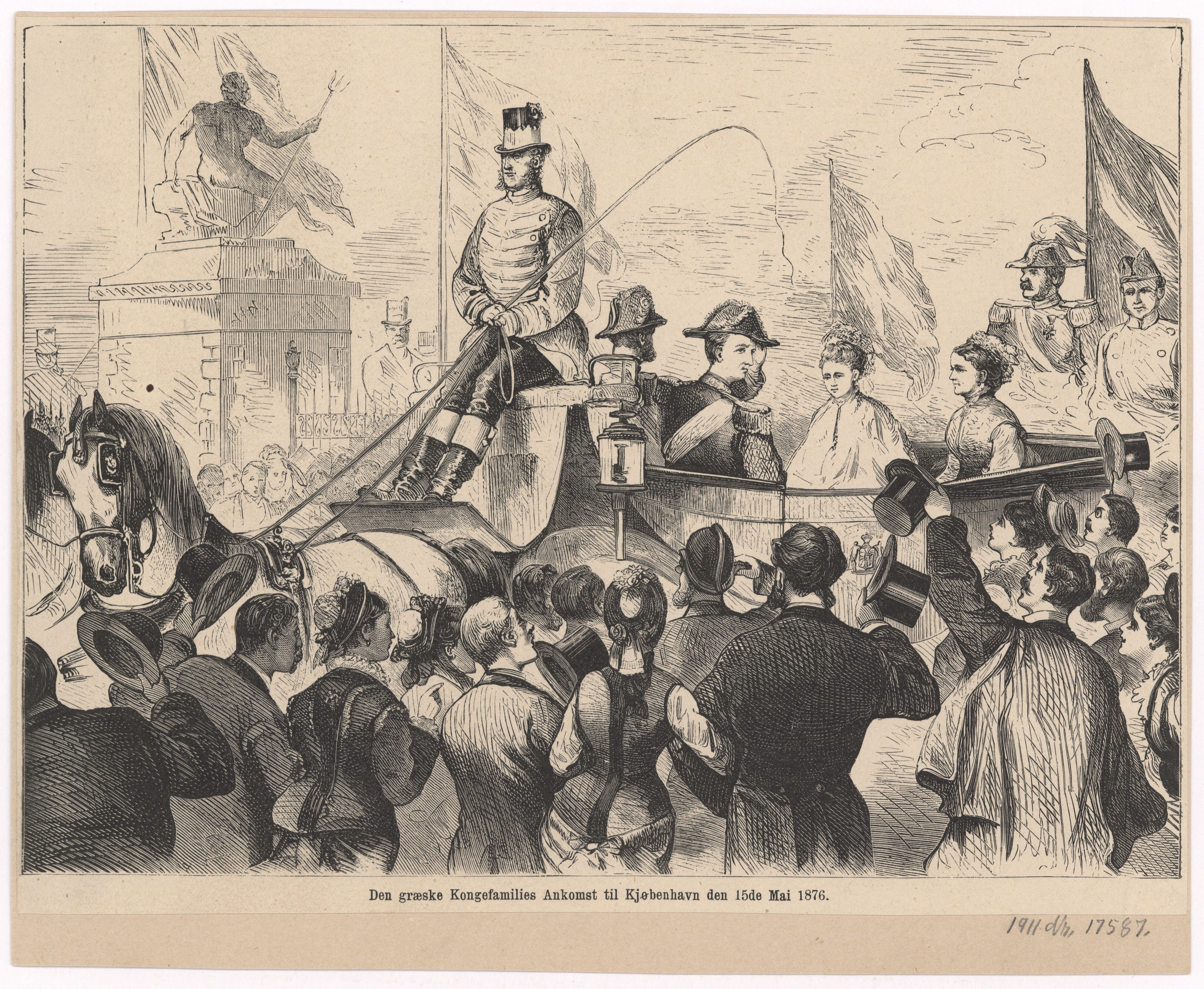
15 May: The Greek royal family arrives to Copenhagen.

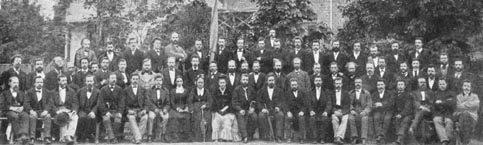
Group photo from the Social Democratic congress at Gimle in June 1876

- 18 March – The newspaper Nationaltidende is published for the first time.
- 2 April – The first issue of Ravnen, a labour movement magazine, is published.
- 25 April – The 1876 Folketing election is held. The Liberal Party wins 74 out of 102 seats.
- 26 April – Kjøbenhavns Boldklub is founded.
- 8 June – On a congress at the entertainment venue Gimle in Copenhagen, the Social Democratic Party adopts its first political programme, Gimleprogrammet.
- 15 May: The Greek royal family arrives to Copenhagen.
- 12 July – The Svendborg Railway Line opens between the towns of Odense and Svendborg on Funen.
- 26 August – The Ryomgård–Grenaa section of the Grenaa Line railway is opened, as are the stations along it: Ryomgård, Kolind, Trustrup and Grenaa.
- 25 September – The Hans Christian Ørsted Monument in Ørstedsparken in Copenhagen is inaugurated.
- 8 October – Prince Harald is born to Crown Prince Frederick and Crown Princess Louise.
- 18 November – The Royal Danish Geographical Society is founded.

=== Date unknown ===
- Julius Mortensen Shipping, present-day United Shipping & Trading Company, is founded in Fredericia.

== Sports ==
- 26 April – Kjøbenhavns Boldklub is founded.

== Publications ==
- Jens Peter Jacobsen's Fru Marie Grubbe (Marie Grubbe. A Lady of the Seventeenth Century, 1976)

== Births ==
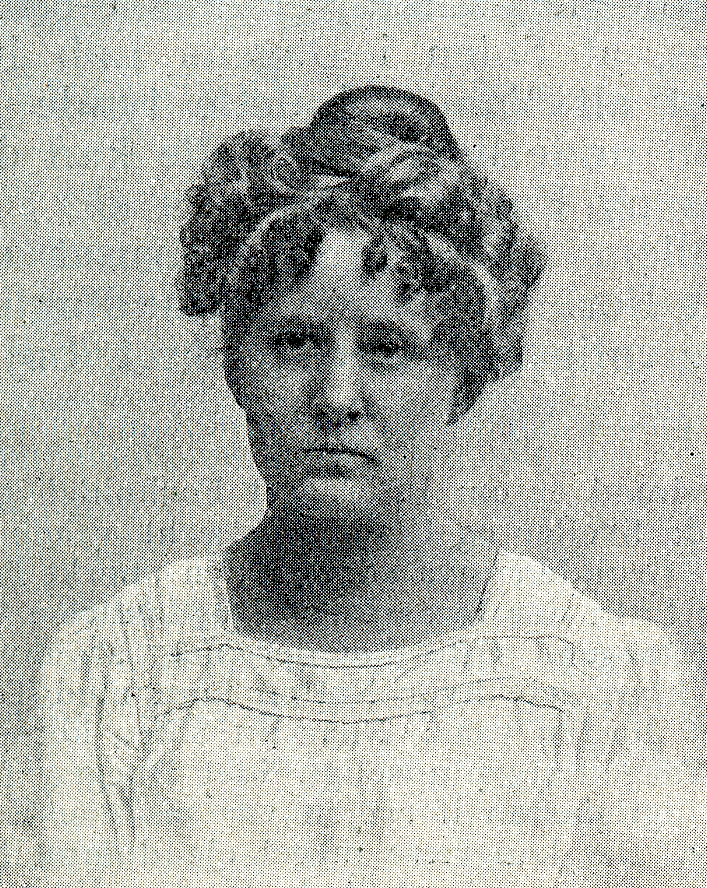
Thit Jensen.

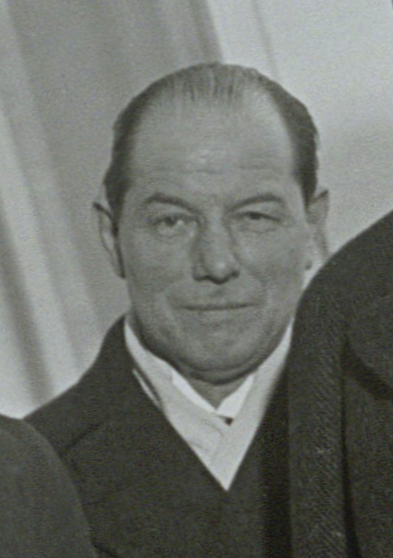
Ivar Bentsen.

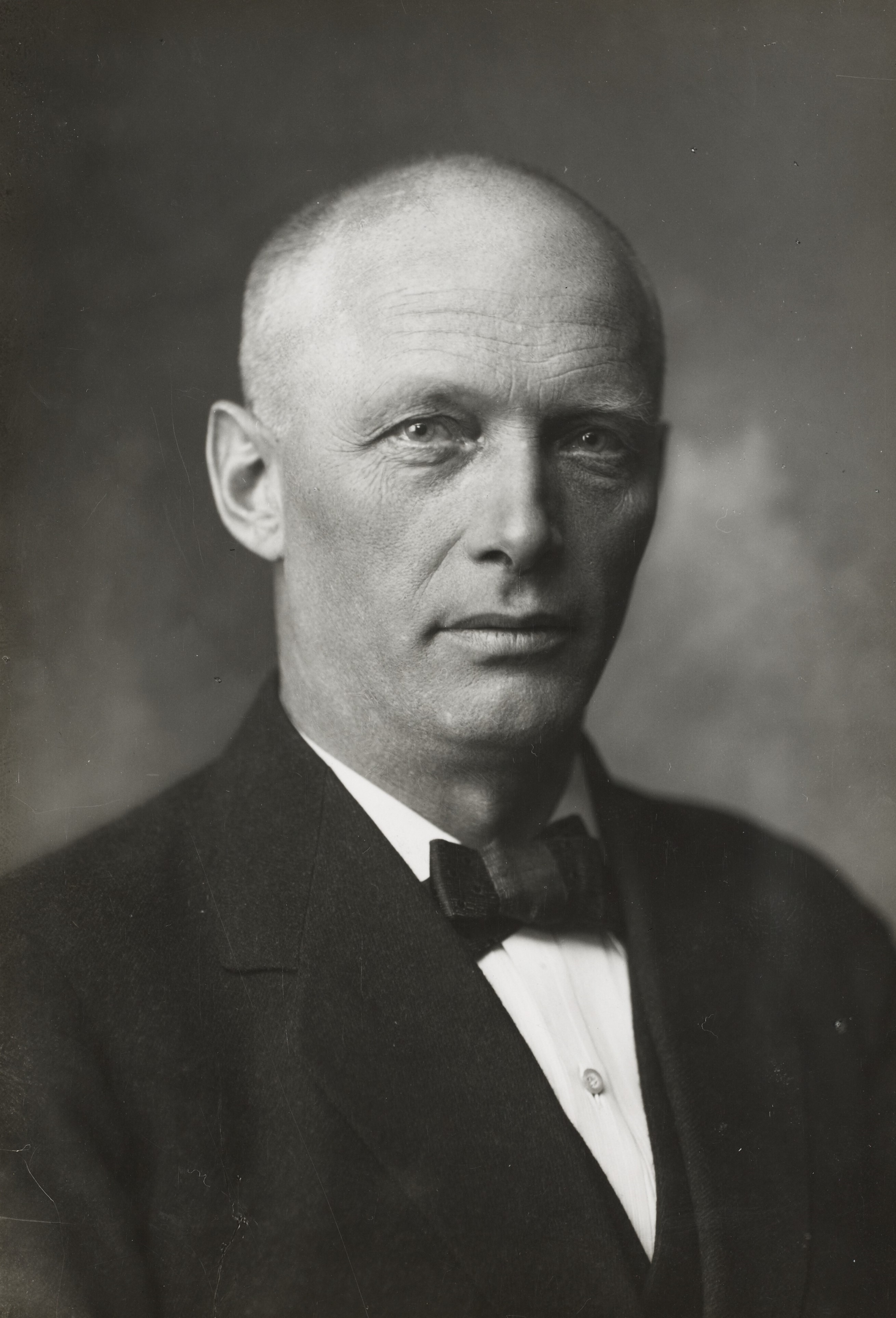
Thomas Madsen-Mygdal.

=== January–March ===
- 17 January – Morten Korch, writer of populist stories and romances (died 1954)
- 19 January
  - Camillo Carlsen, composer (died 1948)
  - Thit Jensen, novelist and author of short stories, plays and society-critical articles (died 1957)
- 29 January – Ludolf Nielsen, composer, violinist, conductor and pianist (died 1939)
- 12 February – Roger Henrichsen, composer and pianist (died 1926)
- 10 March – Edvard Eriksen, sculptor, creator of the Little Mermaid statue (died 1959)
- 20 February – Kristian Møhl, painter and decorative artist (died 1962)

=== April–June ===
- 29 May – Christine Swane, painter associated with the "Funen Painters" (died 1960)
- 2 June – Hakon Børresen, composer (died 1954)

=== July–September ===
- 1 July – Karen Jeppe, missionary and social worker (died 1935)
- 13 July – Anders Petersen, sport shooter, gold medalist in 300 metre team military rifle, standing, at the 1920 Summer Olympics (died 1968)
- 18 July – William Wain Prior, major-general, commander-in-chief of the Royal Danish Army 1939–1941 (died 1946)
- 6 August – Christian Christensen, track and field athlete, competitor at the 1900 Summer Olympics (died 1956)
- 22 August – Erik Christian Clemmensen, Danish-American chemist, inventor of the Clemmensen reduction (died 1941)
- 12 September – Frederik Jacobsen, actor (died 1922)

=== October–December ===
- 2 October – Arnold Peter Møller, shipping magnate, founder of A. P. Moller-Maersk (died 1965)
- 8 October – Prince Harald, royal, army officer (died 1949)
- 28 October – Hans Denver, sport shooter, competitor at the 1912 and 1920 Summer Olympics (died 1961)
- 30 October – Holger Jacobsen, architect (died 1960)
- 13 November – Ivar Bentsen, architect (died 1943)
- 22 November – Erik Arup, historian (died 1951)
- 25 November – John Christen Johansen, Danish-American portraitist (died 1964)
- 14 December – Jørgen Arenholt, tennis player, competitor at the 1912 Summer Olympics (died 1953)
- 22 December – Jens Laursøn Emborg, organist and composer (died 1957)
- 24 December – Thomas Madsen-Mygdal, farmer, politician, Prime Minister of Denmark 1926–1929 (died 1943)

== Deaths ==
=== January–March ===
- 14 January – Rudolph Striegler, photographer (born 1816)
- 23 January – Axel Liebmann, composer (born 1849)
- 24 January – Rudolph Striegler, photographer (born 1816)
- 27 January – Johan Peter Andreas Anker, military officer (born 1838)
- 28 February – Franziska Carlsen, writer and local historian (born 1817)

=== March–May ===
- 5 May – Georg Grothe, composer (born 1822)
- 2 June – Frederikke Løvenskiold, composer (born 1785)
- 9 June – Frederik Theodor Kloss, painter (born 1802)

=== July–September ===
- 3 August – Waldemar Tully Oxholm, diplomat and court official (born 1805)

=== October–December ===
- 17 December – Ejler Andreas Jorgensen, painter (born 1838)
- 27 December – Frederik Paludan-Müller, poet (born 1809)
- 30 December – Christian Winther, lyric poet (born 1796)
