= Roald Als =

Danish cartoonist

- Born: April 2, 1948 (age 78) Frederiksberg, Denmark
- Areas: Cartoonist, author
- Awards: Danish Ministry of Culture Illustrator Award (1988); National Press Club Award (2008)

Roald Als (born April 2, 1948) is a Danish cartoonist best known for his editorial cartoons in Danish newspapers Weekendavisen and Politiken.

== Early life ==
Roald Als was born in Frederiksberg, Denmark on April 2, 1948. His first published cartoon appeared in the national newspaper Politiken in 1968.

== Career ==
During the 1970s, Als' political cartoons appeared in Hovedbladet, Politisk Revy, Ugebladet København, Levende Billeder among other liberal-oriented publications. Als said, in Danish, "The newspapers always supported a proper salary for the working class, so it was actually strange that one always worked for them for free."

Als was employed at Weekendavisen from 1980 to 1994. When his boss moved to become editor of the daily newspaper Politiken, Als followed him to the publication and has worked there henceforth. His drawings are known for their detail and accuracy.

== Awards ==
Als has been the recipient of several awards and grants, including the Alfred Schmidt Grant (1982), the Danish Ministry of Culture Illustrator Award (1988), the Danish Ministry of Culture Initiative Award (1988), Kai Svarre's Grant (1992), Danish Illustrator of the Year (1996), the Carsten Nielsen Grant (1998), the Victor Award (2001), the Danish Confederation of Trade Unions Culture Award (2003) and the Danish National Press Club Award (2008).

== Personal life ==
Als' first marriage was to Eliza Fonnesbach-Sandberg in 1970. He married Annette Margethe Rasmussen in 1990.

== Bibliography ==
- En spøjs fætter (1986)
- Kvinderne ud af køkkenet! (1988)
- Under gulvtæppet (1982-1992)
- Personlig tog jeg ikke skade af at vokse op (1995)
- Politisk korrekt (1995)
- Fodfejl og pletskud (1997) cowritten with Poul Einer Hansen
- De tre Bukke Bruse (1998)
- Håbløst bagud (1999) cowritten with Poul Einer Hansen
- Med ved bordet (2000) cowritten with Poul Einer Hansen
- Vin og vrøvl (2002)
- Frit valg på nederste hylde (2002)
- Fyringsrunde (2004)
- Fru Larsen (2006)
- En god Socialdemokrat (2008)
