= Signe Wenneberg =

Danish journalist and politician (born 1968)

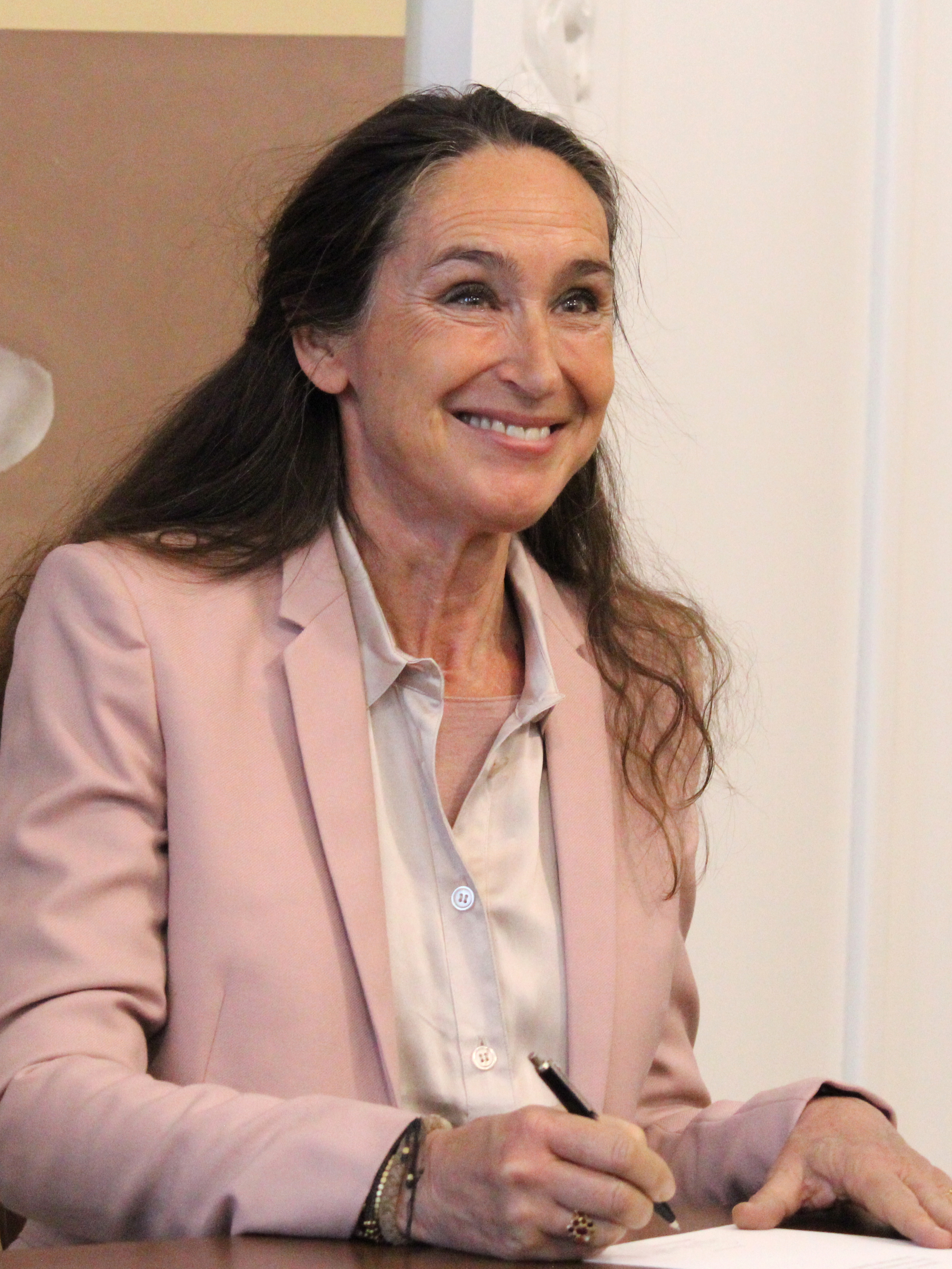
- Wenneberg in 2026
- Born: 1968 (age 57–58)
- Education: University of Copenhagen
- Political party: The Alternative

Signe Marie Wenneberg (born 1968) is a Danish journalist, author and lecturer. She runs her own business and has received several awards for her work in sustainability, the environment and community engagement. She was elected to the Folketing in the 2026 Danish general election.

She has written about gardening in Politiken and in books such as Den første havebog.

== Education ==
Signe Wenneberg studied rhetoric and cultural communication at the University of Copenhagen from 1991 to 1997.

== Career ==
=== Early positions ===
Wenneberg has worked as:

- Permanent culture writer at Politiken
- Programmer at TV 2 and DR
- Teaching assistant at University of Copenhagen
- Chief consultant at Kjaer & Kjerulf
- Managing director at the media agency Vizeum

=== Public records and councils ===
- Former chairman of the Ecolabelling Board – Svanemærket/Blomst-mærket
- Former member of Det Etiske Råd (2013–2016), appointed by Minister of Food Karen Hækkerup
- Member of the board of directors of Madkulturen (2021–2025)
- Member of the board of directors at Hockerup
- Board member at Underværker Realdania (since 2015)
- Board member at Friland A/S (organic meat) 2016–2022

=== Independent business ===
Wenneberg works daily as an independent publisher, speaker, moderator and advisor with a focus on climate, environment, sustainable construction and food.

She runs the media platform "Den Lille Grønne Avis", which started on Instagram and in 2025 got its own website, with over 150,000 regular followers on Instagram.

She is also the owner of www.botaniskgin.dk, founded in 2018 together with her sons.

=== Writer and author ===
Wenneberg has published books on gardening, food, communication and politics. She has been editor of letter boxes in, among others, Bo Bedre and Ude og Hjemme.

=== Networks and initiatives ===
- Founder and chairman of the Albright Group network (2006–2015)
- Founder of the Caged Chicken Liberation Front (since 2011), which works for better animal welfare

== Awards and recognitions ==
- The Sustainable Development Goals Award 2024
- Solidarity Prize 2025
- Honorary Award from the Capital Beautification 2025
- Animal Rights Activist of the Year 2013
- Food Book of the Year, 2013 (for the book Eat Your Garden)

== Projects ==
Wenneberg built the world's first FSC-certified house consisting of 98.7% wood on stilts in 2014, which was covered in TV 2 Danmark programs.

== Charity and ambassadorship ==
Wenneberg has worked with charity for the Red Cross, Danmission, Danida and the Danish Refugee Council. She remains an ambassador for the Børnefonden.

== Political involvement ==
- Parliamentary candidate for the Alternative in the Greater Copenhagen Constituency in the 2026 Danish general election
- Former parliamentary candidate for the Social Democrats in Gentofte in the 2011 Danish general election, but was not elected

== Personal life ==
Wenneberg lives in Hellerup.

== Bibliography ==
- Kunsten at gøre sig umage (1997)
- Skrivehåndbogen (1997)
- Kære far og mor – skilsmissegenerationens voksne børn fortæller (red., 1997)
- Borgerlige ord efter revolutionen (med Henrik Dahl, Christine Antorini m.fl., 1999)
- Fem@il (bidrag, 2000)
- Den første have (2002)
- Den første have (2003)
- Heldige kartofler (2003)
- Komsammen (2005)
- 101 Børneideer (med Nicoline Olsen, 2007)
- Morgenfruer og løjtnantshjerter – en havehuskebog (2008)
- Haveterapi (2009)
- Lev livet selv (2010)
- Den første have (2002/2011)
- Spis din have - klimakrisen set fra køkkenhaven (2012)
- Floras Blomsterbog - om flora danica (2013)
- Altanen - din have i højden (2014)
- Byg Bæredygtigt - med træ, genbrug og nøjsomhed (2015)
- Grønne Hverdagstips - små handlinger der gør en stor forskel (2016)
- Hvad jeg ved om at holde høns (april 2017)

== See also ==
- List of members of the Folketing, 2026–present
