= Nordic Exhibition of 1888 =

1888 exhibition in Copenhagen, Denmark

1888 Copenhagen
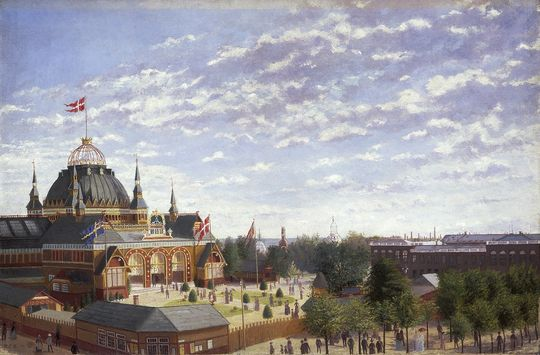
- Exhibition Building at Halmtorvet by Rasmus Carl Rasmussen (1847–1923)

Overview
- BIE-class: Unrecognized exposition
- Name: Nordic Exhibition

Location
- Country: Denmark
- City: Copenhagen
- Coordinates: 55°41′N 12°35′E

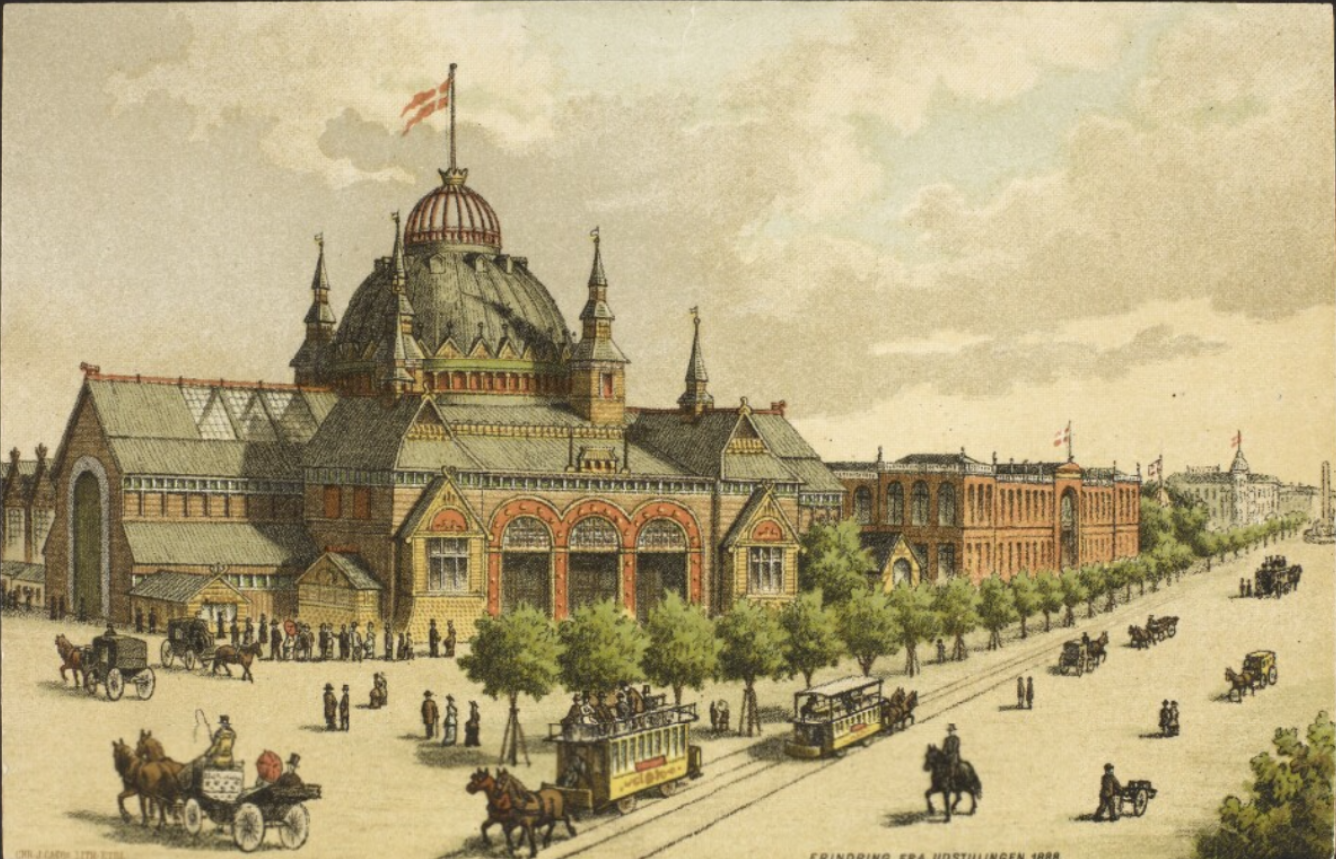
Great Hall of the Nordic Exhibition of 1888

The Nordic exhibition of Industry, Agriculture, and Art of 1888 (Den Nordiske Industri-, Landbrugs- og Kunstudstilling i Kjøbenhavn 1888) was an exhibition held with the goal of presenting developments in art, industry, and agriculture from the five Nordic countries. It was a collaborative effort involving 29 organisations and institutions, with a significant contribution from the private sector, primarily represented by the Association of Copenhagen Industrialists. The exhibition was located in Copenhagen, Denmark.

== Influence of national responsibility ==
In the spring of 1883, the focus of the exhibition was refined based on a proposal by Philip Schou (1838–1922) who was Chairman of the Association of Copenhagen Industrialists and served as Vice President of the expo. Philip Schou was the founding owner of the Aluminia faience (earthenware) pottery factory located in Christianshavn. In 1882, the owners of Aluminia purchased the Royal Copenhagen porcelain factory. Philip Schou emphasized that the purpose of the exhibition was primarily to provide a platform fore most for the Danish citizens to become familiar with the products, lifestyles, and arts from all of Denmark.

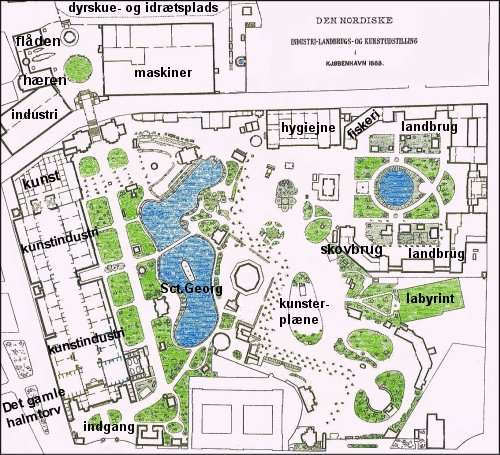
A plan of the exhibition

== Industrial art ==
=== Industrial art and responsibility ===
A cause of conflicts in the exhibition committee was the question of how industrial art should be part of the scenario. To Philip Schou and those who had supported his idea from the beginning, it was the innermost mission of the exhibition to advocate that concept.

Simply put industrial art consisted of reminiscences of romantic thoughts, combined with a critic attitude towards the modern times. The concept included a belief in a certain ‘spirit’ of the ethnic, which in short meant that individual groups upheld certain characteristics. And that these characteristic was somehow manifest in the products created by the people.

It is no wonder that followers of this idea comprehended the introduction of machinery in the latter half of 1800 highly negatively. The machineries tended to exclude the human touch to the products. Which therefore did not become impregnated with the ‘folkgeist’ but became utterly ‘soulless.’ In that respect, the primary challenge of the modern age consisted in finding a method to keep the human touch attached to the products.

The solution was Industrial art. Defined as middle sized factories that kept on using manpower in as many areas as possible, only reserving the hardest work to the machine. Surely this line of reasoning was not attractive to all branches, but primary to those that already included an aspect of ‘artful expression’ to the final product. Needless to mention, almost all the eight originators belonged to such branches.

=== Prevention of national disaster ===
The concept of industrial art had the ability to reach further, than to those already in the branch. This was due to developments in economic thinking. From that direction it was stated that to be successful in the world market that emerged in the second half of the 1800, every country would have to specialize in a range of products.

The outcome of this consideration combined with the idea of industrial art was clear cut. For a small state like Denmark the way to survive on the world market was to specialise in areas where the folkgeist could shine through. In fact this was not a situation of choice, but a necessity!

In the age of the exhibition the high-pitched voices that had the last word, belonged to a minority. However, due to special circumstances that emerged in Denmark after 1864, there was a widespread fear that the nation was on its way to ruin. This fear was pregnant even in places like the administration. And it made many ears and minds perceptible to voices (no matter how high-pinched) which brought forward solutions to prevent the end.

Nevertheless, there was a continuous fight in the exhibition committee on the subject of industrial art. The majority of the committee members outright disagreed that this line of thought should be placed at the front of the exhibition, and thereby state that the organizing body as a whole supported the idea. This battle of expositional ideology was won by the originators. The Copenhagen Exhibition was first and foremost a tribute to the concept of industrial art.

== Nordic brotherhood ==
One of the stepping stones toward the realization of the expo was to call upon the neighbouring nations and invite them to participate. This would make it possible to get a survey of the standpoint of the Nordic countries in the areas of industry, agriculture, and art. And it would also be a reminder to the crowds of the modern age of their common heritage. From a strategic position the talk of brotherhood was a further avocation of the subject of industrial art. A Nordic home market -secured by trade walls- would ensure a nice stable growth of the many small and middle sized factory units in the region.

However, at this point in the chain of reasoning the originator was oddly silent. The reason to this was most probably that talk of Nordic unity could cause implications to Danish foreign policy. The policy towards Europe's strongest power was in short to ensure that absolutely no steps were taken that could be comprehended ‘negatively.’ Talk of a protected Scandinavian market that would exclude Germany, but include Finland (satellite of Russia) did not fit into that line of policy.

== Exhibition support ==
The idea was fostered by Philip Schou in 1883, the very same year he became chairman of the Association of Copenhagen Industrialists. Since its foundation in the 1840s, the association was meant to act as a dynamic forefront of the modern age. This by introducing newly developed wonders (machinery, mostly) that with success could be implemented by society. But in the span of years that proceeded Philip Schou's entry as chairman this work had had bad conditions. Primary because the membership profile of the association had changed. Reports suggest that a majority of members in the late 1870s comprehended the membership as a club membership, with the weight on relaxation facilities.

When Philip Schou introduced a range of measures to promote industrial art, he faced negative response from a majority of the members. However, a minority was able to commit the association in the aforementioned direction, likely a result of the status they held. This minority was influential due to their significant representation in different boards of the association. And also several were sons of the association's founding fathers. In short, the group of originators looked like a coherent minority.

The reality of the proposal was that the exposition did not require much funding in terms of money. The heavy workload that would be involved would be purely voluntary. So even though the idea may not have been what the majority distinctly wanted, it could not really be seen as harmful to other interests in the association. In a far from unanimous state of mind, the Association of Copenhagen Industrialists therefore, in 1884 undertook the enormous responsibility to organize the exhibition of 1888.

== Exposition committee ==
Institutions as such did not always correspond to the originators view on which connections was needed to fulfill the project. This was reflected in a schedule made in the beginning of 1885 consisting of those who were to participate. Some of the men on the list did not belong to any organisation. Rather they represented political, royal, and economic spheres of society.

It is hardly a surprise that a broad basis of interest was desirable to secure the project, which would indicate that membership of the committee was not limited to institutions. In general this pointed toward a scrutiny of the role individuals were to have in the committee of organisations. For example, most of the institutions that were permitted to join the committee did so by invitation. These typically contained not only the number of seats available for the specific institution, but furthermore the names of those individuals who were designated to the seats.

Actually, the originators sometimes comprehended the institutions as tradable cards. This was apparent as the Royal Agrarian Society joined the committee. As the society's members arrived they stated that they also represented 3 other organisations, which thereby joined the committee. Because admission to the committee for these new organisations had corresponded closely to the individuals’ admittance by the committee's invitation, it was shown that individuals were recognised on a level just as important as the institutions.

Sometimes the importance of institutions was even overruled by persons, as seen in the case of the Royal Danish Academy of Art. The head of the academy did not particularly want the academy to participate, whereas the committee was interested in its participation, but wanted to avoid the director. This situation was at a deadlock for more than a year, until members at the academy finally decided to take matter into their own hands and inform the committee, as well as the director, that they would represent the academy.

== Epilogue ==
By the 1880s the romantic thought of Industrial art was anachronistic. The idea consisted both of a belief in qualities of the ethnic bloodline which was reflected in the handiwork. It required extraordinary political will, to impose the implications hereof into the realm of everyday life. To turn ordinary and educated men on that kind of scheme was uphill all the way.

Nevertheless, this was what the group of originators aimed at by arranging the Expo. It must be concluded they failed. Rather it seems like a majority of those involved went along for the roller coaster ride. This is not to say that the expo did not cause any long lasting results. On the contrary it did; in almost infinite numbers. But the flourishing of Industrial art was not one of them. Rather the concept was placed in a museum.

At the close of the exhibition, the Swedish Villa was purchased by Queen Louise and had it rebuilt at Bernstorff Palace, where it was used by the Royal family until the death of Prince Valdemar in 1939. The small house stood vacant for many years until it was restored in 1995 and then rented out for private use.

== Other sources ==
- Skyggebjerg Louise Karlskov (2017) Industri på udstilling 1888 (Aarhus Universitetsforlag) ISBN 978-87-7184-380-4
