= Claus Bundgård Christensen =

Danish historian (born 1968)

- Born: 1968 (age 57–58); Holstebro, Denmark
- Known for: Books on collaboration and crime in Denmark during World War II

Academic background
- Thesis: Danish: Den sorte børs-krisekriminalitet i Danmark fra besættelsen til efterkrigstid-1939-53, lit. 'The black market - crisis crime in Denmark from the occupation to the postwar years - 1939-1953' (2003)

Academic work
- Discipline: History
- Institutions: Roskilde University
- Website: forskning.ruc.dk/site/en/persons/claus-bundgaard-christensen(f85d84f8-d9bb-4fc7-8fc0-fbbf360085cb).html

Claus Bundgård Christensen (born 1968) is a Danish historian and associate professor at Roskilde University known for his books related to collaboration and crime in Denmark during and following World War II.

In 1998, he, and historians Niels Bo Poulsen and Peter Scharff Smith, published the book Under hagekors og Dannebrog - danskere i Waffen SS (Under Swastika and Dannebrog - Danes in Waffen SS), acclaimed for its non-apologist and detailed description of the Danes who volunteered for service in the Waffen SS on the Eastern front. Their 2016 book Waffen-SS : Europas nazistiske soldater (Waffen-SS: Europe's Nazi soldiers) has been translated to Dutch.

In addition to his World War II era publications, he wrote Danskere på Vestfronten 1914-1918 (Danes on the Western Front 1914-1918), which also received very positive reviews and won the 'History book of the year' (Årets historiske bog) award in 2009.

Since 2010, he has been a reviewer of non-fiction books for Weekendavisen.

== Bibliography (selected) ==
- Christensen, Claus Bundgård; Poulsen, N. B.; Smith, P. S. (1997). Dansk arbejde - tyske befæstningsanlæg [Danish labor - German fortifications] (in Danish). Blåvandshuk: Blåvandshuk Egnsmuseum. 112 pages. ISBN 8789834259. OCLC 464122481.
- Christensen, Claus Bundgård; Poulsen, N. B.; Smith, P. S. (2006). Under hagekors og Dannebrog : danskere i Waffen SS 1940–45 [Under Svastika and Dannebrog : Danes in Waffen SS 1940–45] (in Danish and English) (4th ed.). Aschehoug. 521 pages. ISBN 978-87-11-11843-6. OCLC 474724051.
- Christensen, Claus Bundgård (2010). Danskere på Vestfronten 1914-1918 [Danes on the Western Front 1914-1918] (in Danish). Copenhagen. 536 pages. ISBN 9788702081039. OCLC 898207563.
- Christensen, Claus Bundgård; Poulsen, N. B.; Smith, P. S. (2016). Waffen-SS : Europas nazistiske soldater [Waffen-SS: Europe's Nazi soldiers] (in Danish). Copenhagen: Gyldendals Bogklub. 783 pages. ISBN 9788703073613. OCLC 941340419.
