= Frank Jaeger =

Frank Jaeger may refer to:

- Frank Jæger (1926–1977), Danish writer
- Frank Jaeger, the civilian name of the character Gray Fox in the Metal Gear video game series
