= Thorkild Bjørnvig =

Danish writer

Thorkild Strange Bjørnvig (Danish: [ˈpjɶɐ̯nˌviˀ]; 2 February 1918, Aarhus, Denmark – 5 March 2004, Samsø) was a Danish author and poet.

== Overview ==
Bjørnvig studied literature at the University of Aarhus and his prize winning MA thesis (1947) was about Rainer Maria Rilke, whose works he later translated into Danish. With Bjørn Poulsen he founded the literary journal Heretica, as a reaction against the modernist and realist wave in Danish literature, that had prevailed in the years before the Second World War. Bjørnvig also edited the first two volumes of the magazine. Heretica was largely inspired by the British periodical The Criterion by T. S. Eliot and was published from 1948–1953, promoting writers such as Frank Jæger, Jørgen Gustava Brandt, Benny Andersen and Per Højholt.

Among his poetry collections are Stjærnen bag Gavlen (1947), Anubis (1955), Figur og Ild (1959), Ravnen (1968) Morgenmørke (1977), Gennem regnbuen (1987) og Siv, vand og måne (1993). He also published essays about Danish and international authors such as Frank Jæger, Sophus Claussen, Rilke and Edgar Allan Poe.

In a series of autobiographical books, he described his complicated friendship with Karen Blixen from 1948 to 1955 (Pagten, 1974), his childhood (Solens have og skolegården, 1983; Hjørnestuen og månehavet, 1984) and his time as a student during and after World War II (Jordens hjerte, 1986; Ønsket, 1987).

In 2006, the title poem from Bjørnvig's 1955 collection of poems Anubis became part of the Danish Culture Canon of literature.

== Biography ==
Thorkild Strange Bjørnvig grew up in Mejlgade in Aarhus as the son of factory inspector Theodor Frese Pedersen Bjørnvig and his wife Adda Thomine Hammel Jensen. He graduated from Aarhus Katedralskole in 1938, after which he became a student of literary science at Aarhus University. In 1964 he attained a doctorates degree at the same university.

From 1973 onwards, Thorkild Bjørnvig lived on the island of Samsø.

== Bibliography ==
- Stjærnen bag gavlen. Gyldendal 1947.
- Martin A. Hansens digtning. 1949.
- Anubis. Poems. Gyldendal 1955.
- Figur og ild. Poems. Gyldendal 1959.
- Begyndelsen. Essays. 1960.
- Vibrationer. Gyldendal 1966.
- Ravnen. Gyldendal 1968.
- Pagten. Mit venskab med Karen Blixen. 1974.
- Delfinen. Miljødigte 1970-75. Gyldendal 1975.
- Stoffets krystalhav. 1975.
- Morgenmørke. Digte. 1977.
- Også for naturens skyld. Ecological essays. 1978.
- Gennem regnbuen. 1987.
- Den følende planet. Seven essays 1959-86. 1988.
