= Svikmøllen =

Danish satirical magazine

Svikmøllen (meaning the Vicious Circle in English) is a satirical Danish annual magazine published by Aschehoug. Its name stems from the Danish term svikmølle, a highly advantageous position in the board game Mill, where an opponent's piece can be eliminated every turn (forming an unpleasant vicious circle for the opponent), or metaphorically any unpleasant situation one cannot get out of.

== History and profile ==
Svikmøllen was first published in 1915, with Sven Brasch as the main cartoonist. The 2008 edition was the 94th issue.

Svikmøllen contains cartoons and text by various illustrators and humorists lampooning events in the past year. One of the former contributors is Robert Storm Petersen.

Along with its counterpart Blæksprutten, Svikmøllen is a classic choice for the mandelgave (literally almond gift) for Christmas, that is, a special gift for the person who finds the whole almond that has been put in the risalamande traditionally served on Christmas Eve in Denmark.

== See also ==
- List of magazines in Denmark
