= Penge (disambiguation) =

Penge is a suburb of London, England.

Penge may also refer to:

== Places ==
- Penge Common, a former area of London
- Penge railway station
  - Penge East railway station
  - Penge West railway station
- Penge Urban District, a former district of London
- Penge, Limpopo, a township in Limpopo, South Africa

== People ==
- Marco Penge (born 1998), English professional golfer

== Other ==
- "Penge", a song by Public Image Ltd, from the album End of World
- Penge og Privatøkonomi, Danish finance magazine
- Rumpole and the Penge Bungalow Murders, a novel by John Mortimer
