= Harald Simonsen =

Danish businessman (1873–1949)

Harald Simonsen (2 August 1873 – 3 February 1949) was a Danish timber merchant, brickyard owner and developer.

== Early life and education ==
Simonsen was born on 2 August 1873 in Copenhagen, the son of merchant Georg Harald Simonsen (1841–1890) and Caroline Jensen (1845–1913). He graduated from Nørrebros Latin- og realskole in 1889 and was then an apprentice for three years at B. Kromann jr. in Marstal before working first for the textile company v. Barm & Petersen in Flensburg and then for six years for Holger Petersen on Købmagergade in Copenhagen.

== Career ==
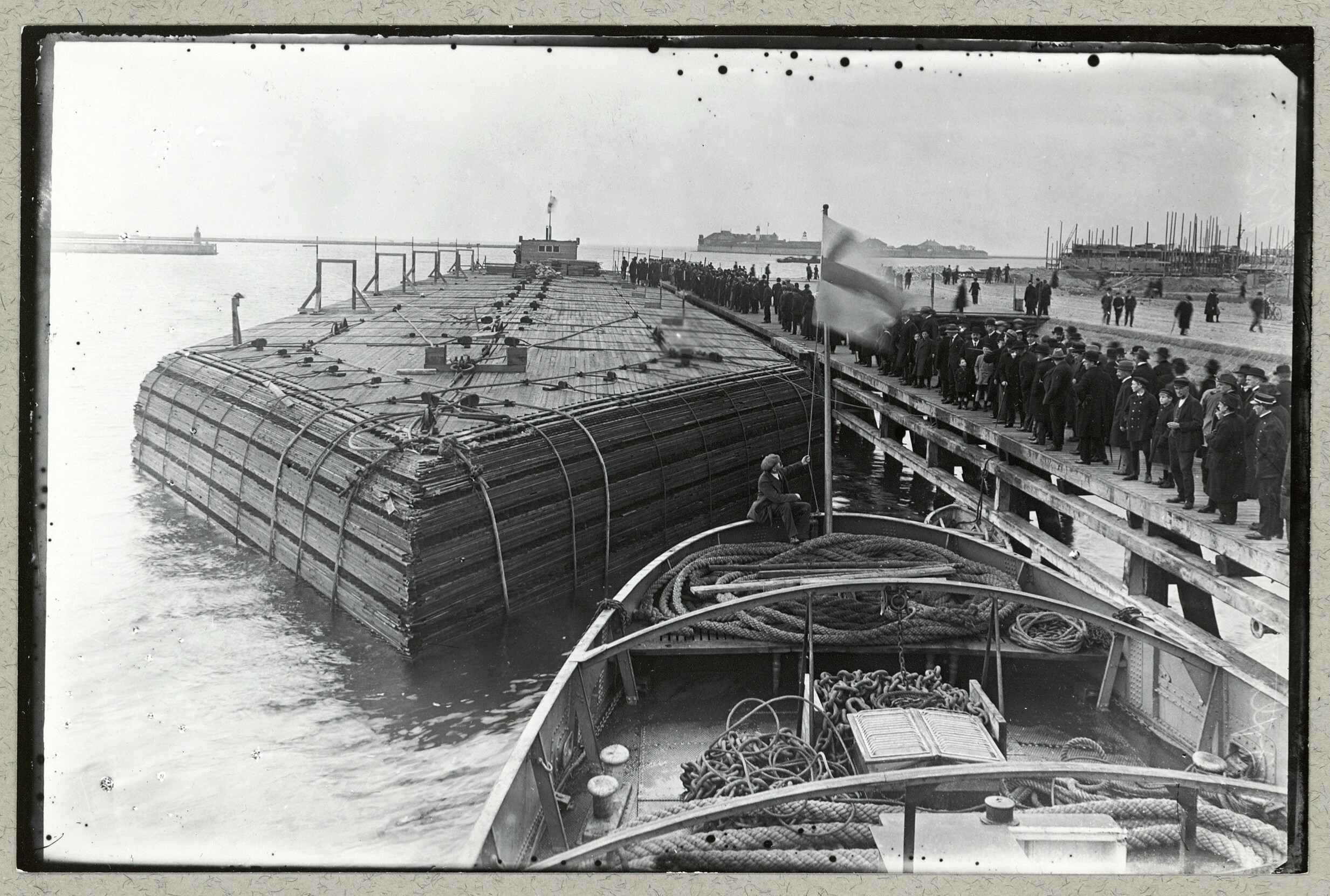
Simonsen's timber raft arriving at Copenhagen.

In 1899, Simonsen started his own company which traded in building materials. The company grew rapidly. It purchased Niverød Brickworks in 1911, Snesere Brickworks in 1916 and later also Kollerup Brickworks. He was also a major importer of timber from Sweden and Finland. In 1918, when World War I had resulted in a shortage of cargo ships, he attracted media attention for converting a delivery of timber from Finland into a gigantic raft, naming it Refanut and towing it to Denmark.

Simonsen's business gave him a thorough knowledge of the construction industry. During the economic crisis of the 1920s, Simonsen was stuck with great quantities of timber and bricks that no one wanted to buy. He responded by starting a new career as a developer. In 1926, he acquired a large piece of land at Svanemøllen in Copenhagen from the estate of S. N. Meyer. He constructed Svanemøllegården and Ulfsgård and sold off the rest of the land in lots. He was later also involved in a number of other development projects, both alone and in collaboration with others. These included Lindevangsgården, Hostrups Have, Ringkøbinggården, Hollændervænget and Thorsgård.

In 1936, Simonsen converted his company to a limited company under the name Harald Simonsen A/S with an initial capital of DKK 1 million. The property management division was placed in a separate company.

== Personal life ==
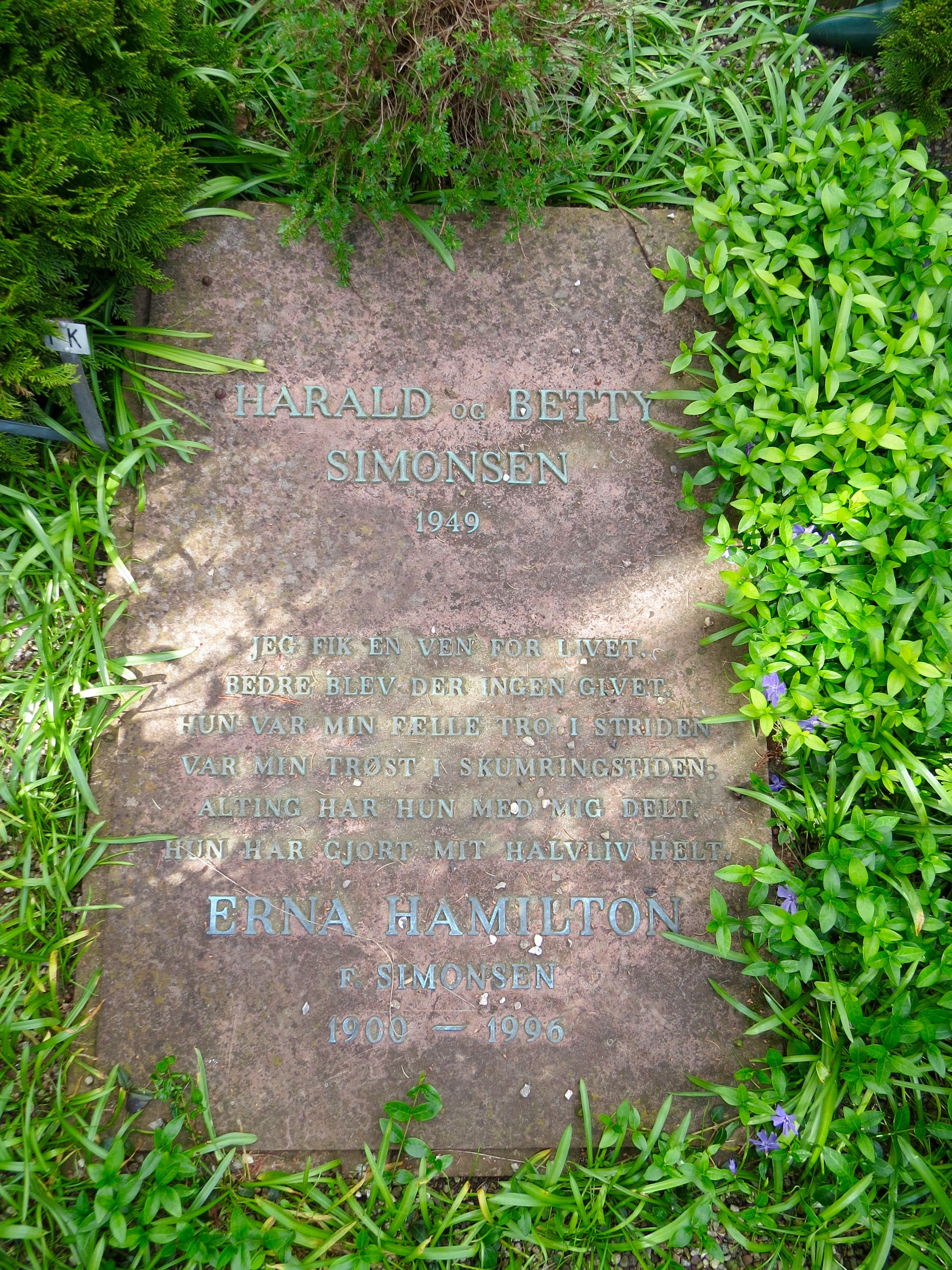
Simonsen's grave in Frederiksberg Old Cemetery

Simonsen married Betty Nathalia Thorup (1877–1949) on 10 January 1899. The couple had two children, Ib Simonsen and Erna Hamilton (née Simonsen).

Simonsen constructed a house on Østerbrogade (now Dag Hammerskjolds Allé 28) for his own use in 1917. The building was designed by Carl Brummer and is known as "Little Amalienborg". He was a skilled cricket player and an honorary member of Danske Studenters Roklub. He became Knight of the Order of the Dannebrog in 1927 and was awarded the 'Cross of Honour ('Dannebrogsmand) in 1939.

He died on 3 February 1949 and is buried in Frederiksberg Old Cemetery.
