= Idényt =

Danish language lifestyle magazine

- Categories: Lifestyle magazine
- Frequency: Ten times per year
- Publisher: Benjamin Media
- Founded: 1978; 47 years ago
- Company: Bonnier Group
- Country: Denmark
- Based in: Frederiksberg, Copenhagen
- Language: Danish
- Website: Idenyt
- ISSN: 1903-184X
- OCLC: 1250190567

Idényt (Danish: New Ideas) is a lifestyle magazine freely distributed to households. The magazine has been included in the Guinness Book of Records as the world's largest free magazine. It has existed since 1978.

== History and profile ==
Idényt was established in 1978. The founding publisher of the magazine is Kai Dige Bach A/S. Bonnier Group acquired 50 % of its publisher, the Benjamin Media, in 2002. In 2009, Bonnier Group fully acquired both the publisher and the magazine.

Previously Idényt was published on a quarterly basis. Later its frequency was switched to ten times per year and the magazine has eight different versions. It has its headquarters in Frederiksberg, and offers articles about home and garden. Gitte Højbjerg is the director of sales of the magazine.

In 2001, Idényt had a circulation of 2,517,000 copies, making it the fifth largest special interest magazine worldwide.

== See also ==
- List of magazines in Denmark
