= Aktuel Naturvidenskab =

Danish popular science magazine

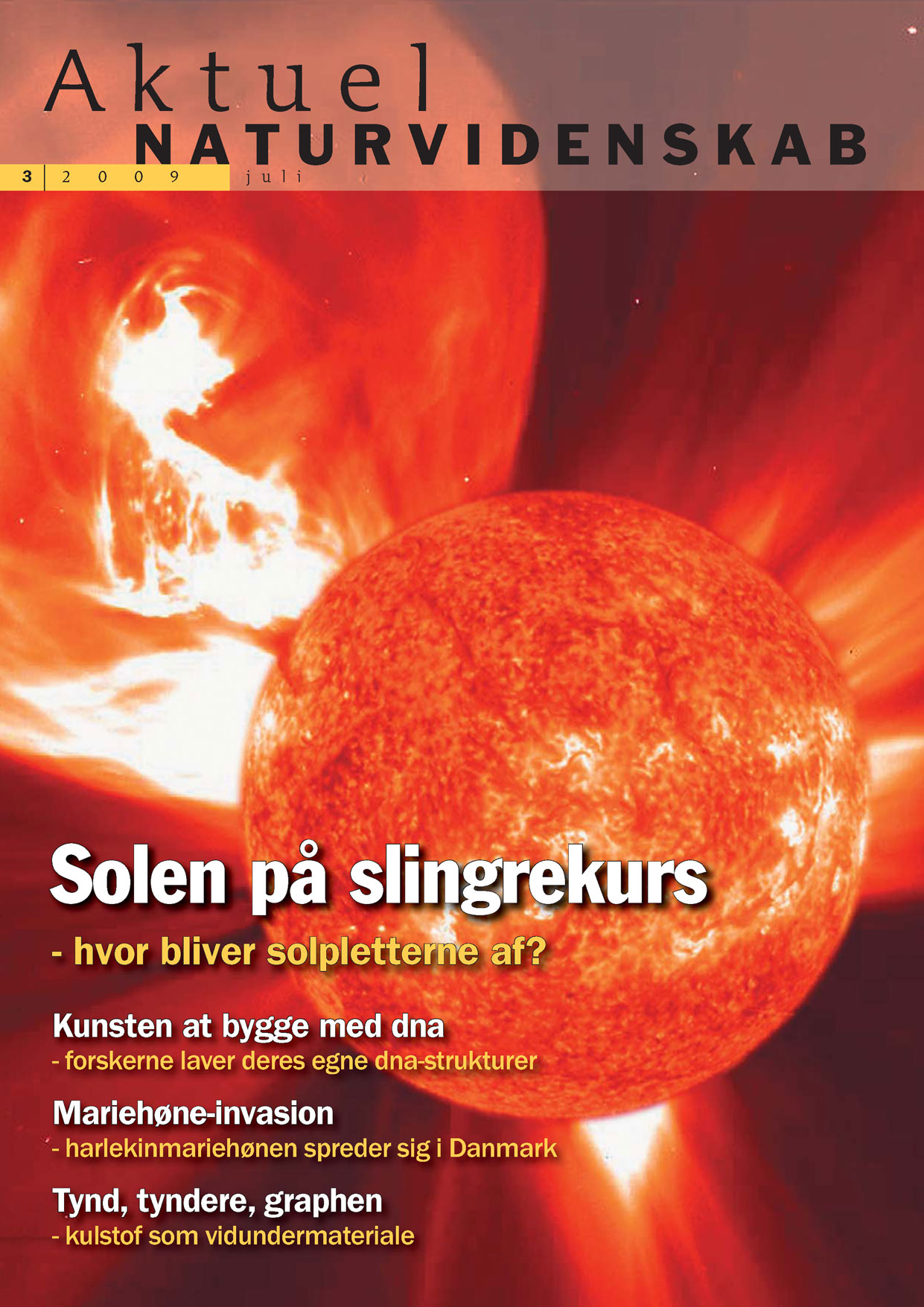
- Cover of the 3rd issue, 2009 (July issue). The main headline reads:The sun on an erratic course - where are the sunspots?
- Editors: Jørgen Dahlgaard and Carsten Rabæk Kjaer
- Categories: Popular science
- Frequency: 6 issues per year
- Total circulation: 8,600 (2008)
- First issue: 1 April 1999; 27 years ago
- Company: Faculty of Science and Technology, University of Aarhus in cooperation with Danish universities and institutions
- Country: Denmark
- Based in: Aarhus
- Language: Danish
- Website: https://aktuelnaturvidenskab.dk
- ISSN: 1399-2309
- OCLC: 609880612

Aktuel Naturvidenskab (lit.: Current Science) is a Danish language popular science magazine published in Aarhus, Denmark.

== Profile ==
Aktuel Naturvidenskab is published by the Faculty of Science and Technology at the University of Aarhus in cooperation with Danish universities and institutions. It mostly provides news and in-depth articles on natural sciences, and it is one of the media partners of ScienceNordic.

In 2011, the magazine expanded its digital version, and now maintains an on-line digital archive of all published articles. The archive is public and free to use for non-commercial purposes.

== See also ==
- List of magazines in Denmark
