= Punch (Danish magazine) =

Defunct satirical magazine in Denmark

- Categories: Satire
- First issue: 1873
- Final issue: 1894
- Country: Denmark
- Based in: Copenhagen
- Language: Danish

Punch (1873–1894) was an illustrated conservative Danish satirical magazine modelled on the English Punch.

== See also ==
- List of magazines in Denmark
