= Mandag Morgen =

Weekly business and political magazine in Denmark

- Categories: Business magazine Political magazine
- Frequency: Weekly
- Publisher: House of Mandag Morgen
- Founded: 1989; 37 years ago
- Country: Denmark
- Based in: Copenhagen
- Language: Danish
- Website: Mandag Morgen
- ISSN: 0905-4332
- OCLC: 898464283

Mandag Morgen, also known as Ugebrevet Mandag Morgen, is a Danish weekly business and political magazine published in Copenhagen, Denmark.

== History and profile ==
Mandag Morgen was established in 1989. The magazine is published by the House of Mandag Morgen on a weekly basis.

Its major target audience is decision-makers in both private and public sectors. Although main focus of Mandag Morgen is on business and economy, it also covers articles about public sector reforms and politics. For instance, the magazine publishes the results of various opinion polls one of which was about the changing attitudes of Danes about Islam following the events of 11 September 2001. From 2016 Mandag Morgen has used an online fact-checker entitled Tjek Det to ensure that the news covered is based on facts.

In 1997 the circulation of Mandag Morgen was 157,050 copies.

== See also ==
- List of magazines in Denmark
