= Hendes Verden =

Danish women's magazine

- Categories: Women's magazine
- Frequency: Weekly
- Publisher: Egmont Magasiner A/S
- Founded: 1937; 89 years ago
- Company: Egmont Group
- Country: Denmark
- Based in: Copenhagen
- Language: Danish
- Website: Hendes Verden

Hendes Verden (Danish: Her World) is a weekly women's magazine and family magazine based in Copenhagen, Denmark. The magazine has been in circulation since 1937.

== History and profile ==
The magazine was established with the name Flittige Hænder (Danish:Diligent Hands) in 1937. It was renamed Hendes Verden in 1965. The magazine is part of the Egmont, Group and its publisher is Egmont Magasiner A/S. Its former publisher was Gutenberghus Bladene. The magazine is published weekly and is headquartered in Copenhagen. The weekly offers articles on health foods, personal care, diet, health tips, interior decorating and needlework.

== Circulation ==
Hendes Verden sold 129,000 copies in 1967, 115,000 copies in 1968, 110,000 copies in 1969 and 108,000 copies in 1970. The circulation of the weekly was 98,000 copies in 1971, 106,000 copies in 1972, 127,000 copies in 1973 and 147,000 copies in 1974.

Hendes Verden sold 57,000 copies in 2001. In the first half of 2007 the circulation of the magazine was 47,836 copies. It was 48,000 copies in 2007 and 45,000 copies in 2008. The magazine had a circulation of 38,732 copies in 2010 and 36,903 copies in 2011. It was 33,276 copies in 2012. In 2013 the magazine sold 31,000 copies.

== See also ==
- List of magazines in Denmark
