= Helse (magazine) =

Danish lifestyle magazine

- Categories: Lifestyle magazine
- Frequency: Six to eight times per year
- Founder: Toft Nielsen
- Founded: 1955; 70 years ago
- Country: Denmark
- Based in: Copenhagen
- Language: Danish
- Website: Helse

Helse is a family and lifestyle magazine with a special reference to medical topics. The magazine is published in Copenhagen, Denmark. Its name refers to a traditional Danish word with the meaning of health.

== History and profile ==
Helse was established by Toft Nielsen, an economist, in 1955. The magazine, based in Copenhagen, features articles on advances in health-care services. Helse-Active Living was the owner of the magazine until 2008. The Danish Medical Association supported the magazine, which was financed by the Federation of Sick-benefits Associations until 2012. It was distributed free of charge until that date and has been published six to eight times per year since then. The Pharmacists Association and local authorities began to finance the magazine in 2012.

At the beginning of the 1960s Helse sold nearly 310,000 copies.

== See also ==
- List of magazines in Denmark
