= Gaffa (magazine) =

Nordic music magazine

GAFFA
- August 2009 issue
- CEO: Simon M Sørensen
- Editor-in-Chief: Ole Rosenstand Svidt (DK), Johanna Eriksson (SE), Sigurd Elgenes (NO)
- Former editors: Sidsel Thomassen, Peter Ramsdal
- Categories: magazine
- Frequency: Monthly
- First issue: September 1983
- Company: Gaffa A/S
- Country: Denmark; Sweden; Norway
- Based in: Frederiksberg, Denmark
- Language: Danish; Swedish; Norwegian
- Website: gaffa.dk gaffa.se gaffa.no
- ISSN: 1901-354X

Gaffa (stylized as GAFFA) is a free Nordic music magazine with local editions in Denmark, Norway, and Sweden. Gaffa is Denmark's largest and oldest music magazine. It has been published since 1983 and has 320,000 print readers and 750,000 online readers each month.

The name gaffa comes from gaffer tape, with the magazine's stated intention of "binding the different parts of the music community together".

== History and profile ==
Gaffa has been published on a monthly basis since 1983. The magazine is distributed to places such as educational institutions, record shops, libraries and cafés, as well as a small number to paying subscribers. It features music news and notes, interviews, album reviews and upcoming concert schedules.

Gaffa's website, GAFFA.dk, was established in 1996. Since December 2008 all back issues of the magazine are accessible online free of charge.

In 2008 Gaffa launched GAFFA live, a concert overview for Denmark, Sweden and Norway. In 2009 Gaffa was launched in Sweden, GAFFA Sweden, and in 2011 in Norway, GAFFA Norway.

In April 2006, Gaffa launched a user-written music encyclopedia, GAFFApedia, as a subsection of its website. Based on MediaWiki, it is similar to Wikipedia and covered by the Creative Commons Attribution-Noncommercial-Share Alike licence. GAFFApedia was closed in 2010.

== GAFFA Awards ==
The GAFFA Awards (Danish: GAFFA-Prisen) are an annual event created in 1991 to hand out prizes for music achievements. Since 2010, the awards have been held at a large gala show in Copenhagen, in Odense (2017–2019) and in Musikhuset Aarhus since 2020. Categories include Album of the Year, Foreign Album of the Year, Singer of the Year and Foreign Singer of the Year.

Since 2010, GAFFA’s Swedish readers have also voted for and celebrated their favourite artists through GAFFA Priset. In 2012, GAFFA Norway similarly established its version of the awards.

== See also ==
- List of magazines in Denmark
