= Bionyt =

Danish science magazine

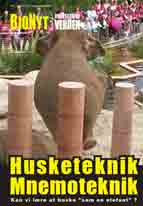
- Cover of the No 140/141 issue
- Editor: Ole Terney
- Categories: Science magazine
- Frequency: About 4 issues per year
- Founded: 1980; 46 years ago
- Company: Foreningen af Yngre Biologer
- Country: Denmark
- Based in: Frederiksberg
- Language: Danish
- Website: Bionyt
- ISSN: 1904-2132

BioNyt Videnskabens Verden (BioNews Science World) is a Danish language popular science magazine published by Foreningen af Yngre Biologer - Biologisk Forum. The magazine was launched in 1980 and is currently being published only in Denmark.

== History and profile ==
BioNyt was established in 1980. According to the official website, the magazine is the oldest popular science magazine on international science currently published in Denmark.

During the 30 years of existence the founder and editor Ole Terney (biologist and librarian) has written all the articles except a handful written by other people.

Many issues focus on one theme like stem cells, the origin of life, astronomy, mnemotechnic, influenza, nanotechnology, CERN, climate change etc. The magazine also covers articles on biology and biotechnology. Furthermore, such themes are also described in question-and-answer form on its website.

== See also ==
List of magazines in Denmark
