= Politisk Revy =

Danish political magazine (1963–1987)

- Categories: Political magazine
- Frequency: Bi-weekly
- Publisher: København
- Founded: 1963
- Final issue: March 1987
- Country: Denmark
- Based in: Copenhagen
- Language: Danish
- ISSN: 0551-3464
- OCLC: 465836373

Politisk Revy (Danish: Political Review) was a Danish bi-weekly political magazine with new left tendency which existed between 1963 and 1987. The magazine was named after the 1920s critical magazine, Critical Revue.

== History ==
Politisk Revy, a bi-weekly magazine, was founded in 1963 by Andreas Jorgensen, a left-wing politician. The other founders were Socialist People's Party members and journalists who had worked for defunct Dialogue magazine.

Politisk Revy was based in Copenhagen and was published by København. The early the editors of the magazine included Andreas Jorgensen, Johan Fjord Jensen, Ulf Christiansen and Sven Skovmand who left the magazine after 1966. Ebbe Kløvedal Reich and Ole Grünbaum were two of its columnists following this period. The former also served as editor of the bi-weekly for one year at the end of the 1960s.

Karen Jespersen, former interior minister, served as the editor of Politisk Revy from 1974 to 1977. Bente Hansen is another former editor-in-chief of the magazine.

Politisk Revy reached its peak circulation in the 1970s with 5,000 copies. During this period the magazine was one of the alternative media together with Information, a newspaper, in Denmark.

The magazine was closed in March 1987 due to low levels of circulation and shaky finances. In 1969 the magazine also began to publish books of which number was 507 until its disestablishment.

== Political leaning, content and censorship ==
Politisk Ravy was not affiliated to any political party or organization. However, in the late 1960s and in the 1970s the magazine functioned as a forum for the new left in Denmark. In addition, people adopted the views of the new left in the country were organized around the magazine. The magazine provided a very theoretical approach towards the leftist ideas. From 1966 the magazine began to publish articles about the role of Cuba as a driving force in Third World revolutionary activities.

Ebbe Kløvedal Reich's editorials in the magazine were mostly about the criticism of the Vietnam War. The Danish transition of the poems by Mahmoud Darwish, a Palestinian writer, were featured in Politisk Revy in 1967. It also contained many articles about the Palestinian crisis which led to its emergence as a leftist cause in Denmark. However, some contributors of Politisk Revy began to challenge the use of violence as a strategy by the Palestinian groups, particularly by the Popular Front for the Liberation of Palestine, after 1972.

In 1969, the Danish police seized the magazine's forthcoming issue for allegedly containing secret military information. The magazine published an editorial in Autumn 1970, arguing that Greenland should have a socialist government.

== See also ==
- List of magazines in Denmark
