= Aluminia =

Danish ceramics factory (1863–1969)

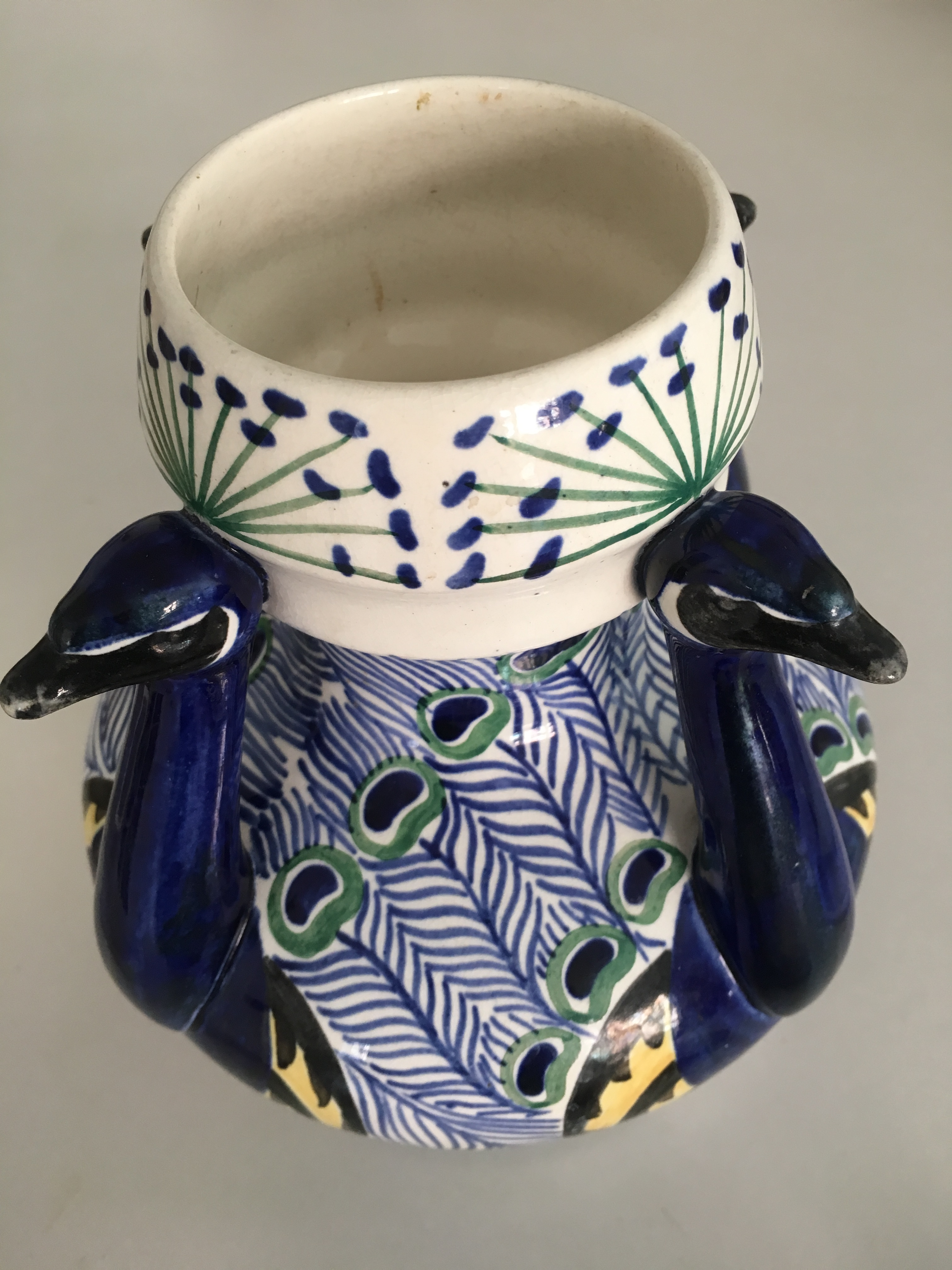
Vase, 1902-06

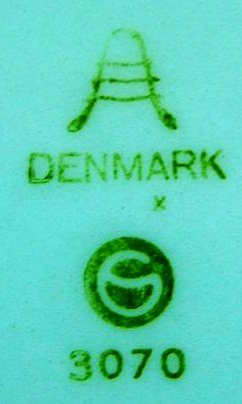
The Aluminia factory mark before 1969

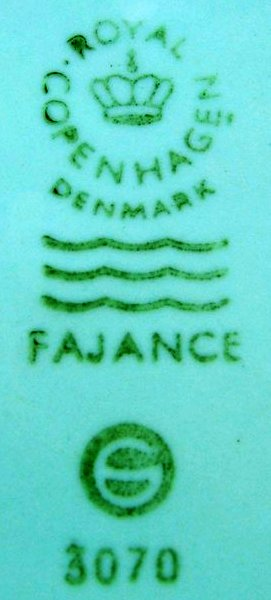
After 1969: The Royal Copenhagen Fajance mark

Aluminia was a Danish factory of faience or earthenware pottery, established in Copenhagen in 1863. Philip Schou (1838-1922) was the founding owner of the Aluminia factory in Christianshavn. In 1882, the owners of Aluminia purchased the Royal Copenhagen porcelain factory.

The factories were operated independently under their respective trade names until 1969, when the use of the Aluminia name was ended. Since then the products have been sold under the mark "Royal Copenhagen Denmark Fajance."

In modern times, the Aluminia factory is best known for the "Blue Line" dinner service, introduced in 1964 and production was stopped by end of year 2010.
