= Penge og Privatøkonomi =

Monthly business magazine in Denmark

- Editor-in-chief: Søren Nielsen
- Categories: Business magazine
- Frequency: Monthly
- Publisher: Benjamin Media
- Founded: 1977; 48 years ago
- Company: Bonnier Group
- Country: Denmark
- Based in: Copenhagen
- Language: Danish
- Website: Penge og Privatøkonomi

Penge og Privatøkonomi (Danish: Money and Personal Finance) is a Danish language monthly business and finance magazine published in Copenhagen, Denmark. It has been in circulation since 1977.

== History and profile ==
Penge og Privatøkonomi was established in 1977. The magazine was started and published by the House of Børsen eleven times per year.

The magazine is part of the Bonnier Group and is published on a monthly basis by Benjamin Media A/S, a subsidiary of the Bonnier Publications.

Penge og Privatøkonomi has its headquarters in Copenhagen. The magazine features articles on stocks, companies and investments. It offers extensive information on personal investment to guide its readers.

Søren Verup served as the editor-in-chief of Penge og Privatøkonomi. As of 2015 Søren Nielsen was the editor-in-chief. In August 2011 the logo and format of the magazine was redesigned.

== Circulation ==
Penge og Privatøkonomi sold nearly 28,000 copies in 1997. Its circulation was 27,818 copies in 2010 and 26,915 copies in 2011. It was 21,008 in the first half of 2012 and 21,079 copies in 2012.

== See also ==
- List of magazines in Denmark
