= Tage Skou-Hansen =

Danish writer, editor and scholar

Tage Skou-Hansen (12 February 1925 – 11 November 2015) was a Danish writer, editor and scholar.

== Overview ==
Born in the town of Fredericia, Tage Skou-Hansen graduated from Marselisborg Gymnasium in Aarhus and became a student of history of literature at Aarhus University. As a student, he worked as an editor of two literary magazines, one of which was Heretica, before the publication of his first novel, De Nøgne Træer (The Bare Trees), in 1957. After receiving his degree, Tage taught literature at Askov Højskole for nine years, before concentrating on writing from 1967.

Apart from his novels, Tage Skou-Hansen's works also includes two plays and a realized film manuscript. He has received many prizes and scholarships throughout his career.

De nøgne træer has been translated into English as The Naked Trees and led to a film with the same title in 1991. The story is set in the milieu of the resistance movement, during the German occupation of Denmark.
