= Vindrosen =

Literary and cultural magazine in Denmark (1954–1974)

- Categories: Literary and cultural magazine
- Founded: 1954
- Final issue: 1974
- Country: Denmark
- Based in: Copenhagen
- Language: Danish
- ISSN: 0042-627X
- OCLC: 1769146

Vindrosen (Danish: Compass Card) was a Danish modernist cultural and literary magazine which existed between 1954 and 1974. It was one of the Danish publications which improved the cultural journalism in the country.

== History and profile ==
Vindrosen was established in 1954 as a successor to another cultural magazine Heretica. The magazine was published by the leading Danish company Gyldendal in Copenhagen.

The focus of Vindrosen was on literary work. During the 1950s the magazine was under the influence of the contributors to Heretica. However, later it abandoned their views and Cold War approach. Instead, Vindrosen began to focus on third world countries. In addition, it became one of the supporters of modernism and radicalism in the 1960s and 1970s in Denmark. In the 1960s, like other Scandinavian literary magazines, Vindrosen adopted eclectic thinking. During the same period it also featured criticisms of literature and society. The magazine closely collaborated with the newspaper Information on these issues. Around the time of the 1968 student protests the magazine functioned as a platform for the young leftist intellectuals who edited it. In 1974 Vindrosen ceased publication.

== Editors and contributors ==
In the 1950s Peter P. Rohde was the editor of Vindrosen. Then Klaus Rifbjerg and Villy Sorensen co-edited the magazine. The former served in the post between 1959 and 1963. In the rest of the 1960s Jess Ørnsbo served in the post. Niels Barfoed was also among the editors of Vindrosen.

Poul Vad was one of the contributors of Vindrosen.
