= Ugebladet Søndag =

Danish women's magazine

- Categories: Women's magazine
- Frequency: Weekly
- Founded: 1921; 104 years ago
- Company: Aller Media
- Country: Denmark
- Based in: Copenhagen
- Language: Danish
- Website: https://www.soendag.dk/

Ugebladet Søndag (also known as Søndag) is a Danish language weekly lifestyle magazine which is headquartered in Copenhagen, Denmark. Launched in 1921 it is one of the oldest publications in the country.

== History and profile ==
Ugebladet Søndag was established in 1921. It is part of Aller Media. The magazine comes out weekly and is based in Copenhagen. It covers articles addressing women. From 2015 Ugebladet Søndag had a semiannual supplement entitled Kvinder med Kurver (Danish: Women with Curves).

As of 2004 the circulation of magazine was 103,603 copies.
