= Ravnen =

Political magazine in Denmark (1876–1921)

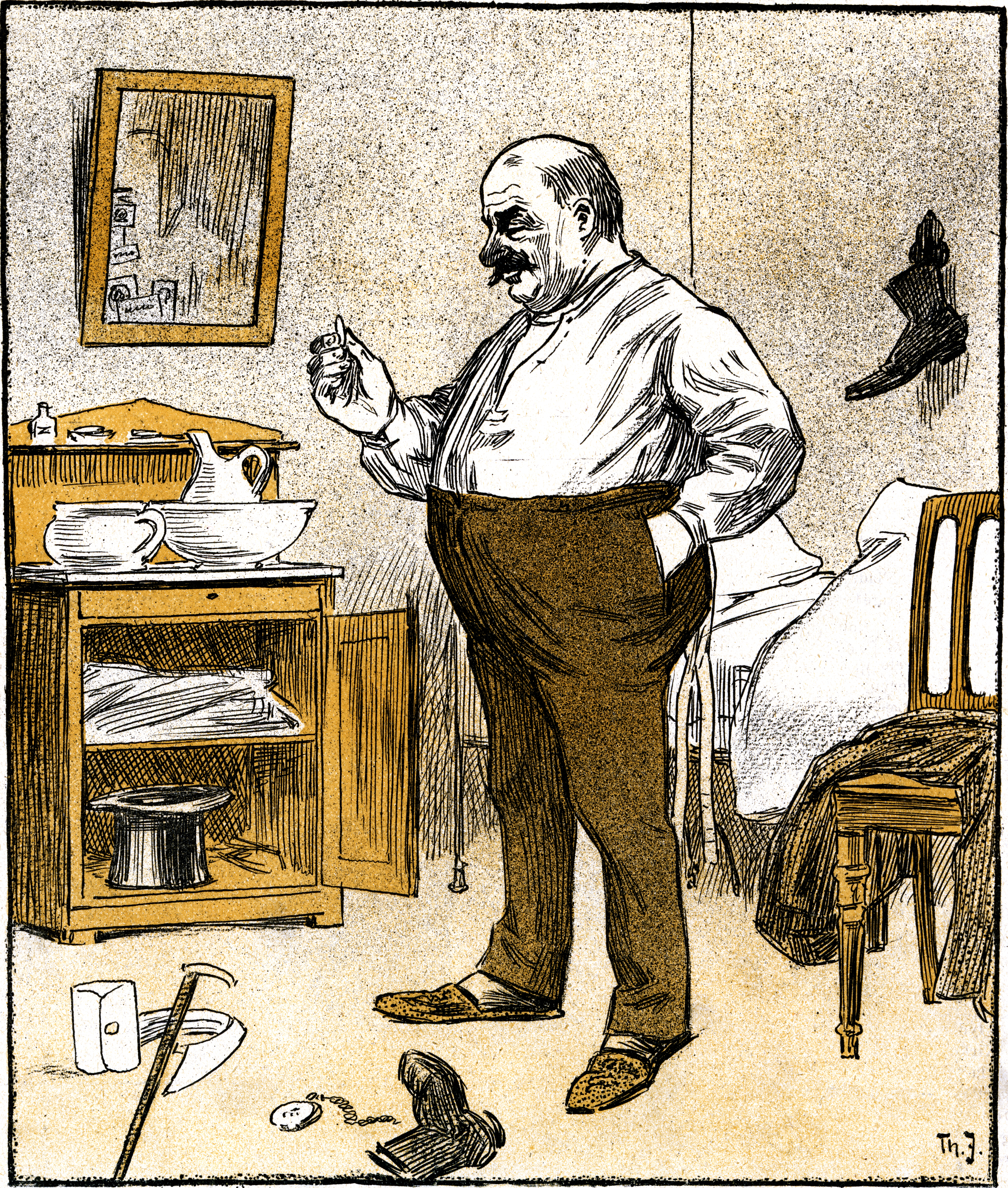
- Ravnen, 8 March 1901, p67
- Categories: Satirical magazine; Political magazine
- First issue: 2 April 1876
- Final issue: 15 July 1921
- Country: Denmark
- Language: Danish

Ravnen (Danish: The Raven) was a Danish political satire magazine published by the Danish labour movement from 2 April 1876 to 7 January 1877 and again from 6 October 1878 until 15 July 1921. Its first editor was Harald Brix. One of the cartoonists contributed to the magazine was Sigurd Wettenhovi-Aspa whose caricatures were mostly about the Russian Empire and Nicholas II.

== See also ==
- List of magazines in Denmark
