= Niverød Brickworks =

Former brickworks in Denmark

- Native name: Niverød Teglværk
- Formerly: P. Koefods teglværk Simondsens teglværk
- Company type: Brickworks
- Industry: Brick manufacturing
- Founded: 1838
- Defunct: 1958
- Fate: Closed and demolished
- Headquarters: Nivå, Denmark
- Products: Bricks

Niverød Brickworks (Danish: Niverød Teglværk), also known as P. Koefod's Brickworks (Danish: P. Koefods teglværk) and Simondsen's Brickworks (Danish: Simondsens teglværk), was one of four brickworks located at Nivå on the Øresund coast north of Copenhagen, Denmark. Nivå Marina is located in one of its former clay pits.

== History ==
Niverød Brickworks was established in Niverød Strandmose in 1838. Lerbjerggaard Brickworks opened at a site just west of the brickyard in 1854 and Sølyst Brickworks opened on an adjacent site to the west in 1856.

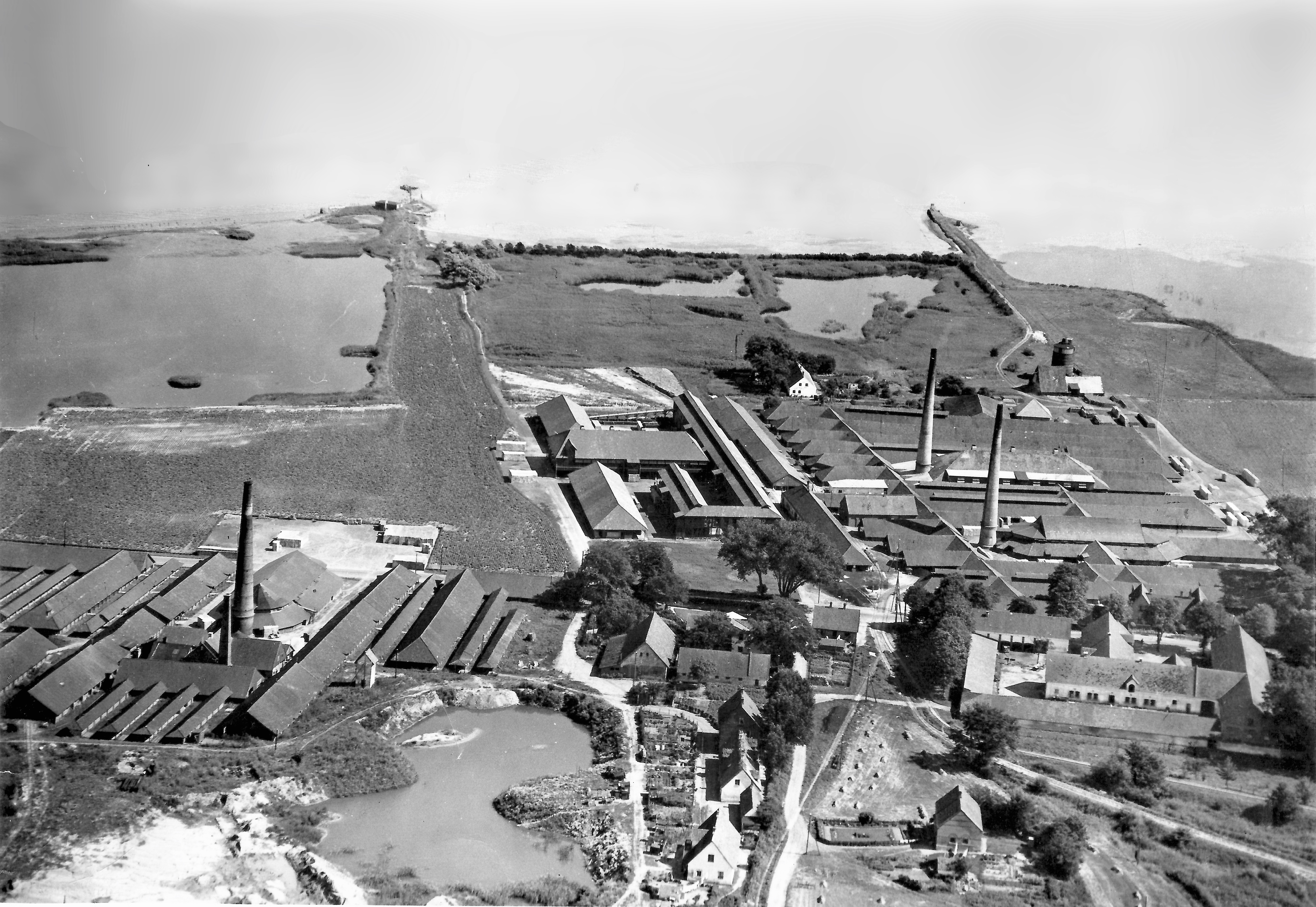
Niverød Brickworks (left) and Sølyst Brickworks (right) seen from the west in the 1930s

Niverød Brickworks was owned by Christian Gottfried Lendorff for a while but struggled economically and was sold in 1862 at compulsory auction. Lendorff then emigrated to Australia. Niverød and Lerbjerggaard brickworks were merged into one company in 1863.

A narrow-gauge railway to Nivå Station was constructed in 1907–1908 and remained in use until c. 1930. In 1911, Niverød Brickworks was acquired by Harald Simonsen. The brickyard was then referred to as Simonsen's Brickyard. The brickworks was later acquired by a man named Kofoed and it was from then on referred to as Kofoed's brickyard.

In the early 1900s, when the clay deposits on land had nearly been exhausted, Niverød and Sølyst brickworks obtained a license to extract clay from the sea bed and a dyke was therefore constructed. in 1930, water broke through the dyke during a storm, flooding the clay pit. Nivå Marina was later constructed at the site. Niverød Brickworks closed in 1958 and the buildings were later demolished.

== Legacy ==
The owner's house from 1868 at Gammel Strandvej and the manager's house at Laveskov Vej are the only surviving buildings associated with the brickyard. Nivå Marina is located in one of the former clay pits and Nivå Camping opened in the other in 1933. A pier from c. 1750 was partly destroyed by ice heave in February 1933 but remains of it can still be seen today.
