= Frank Jæger =

Danish writer (1926–1977)

Frank Jæger (19 June 1926 - 4 July 1977) was a Danish writer most known for his poetry and radio plays. He received the Grand Prize of the Danish Academy in 1969. He also edited two volumes of Heretica magazine with Tage Skou-Hansen.

== Early life and education ==
Jæger was born in the Frederiksberg district of Copenhagen on 19 June 1926. He graduated from Schneekloth's School in 1945 and from the Royal School of Library Science in 1950 but could by then already make a living from his writings.

== Bibliography ==
- Dydige digte (1948)
- Morgenens trompet (digte, 1949)
- De fem årstider (digte, 1950)
- Iners (roman, 1950)
- Hverdagshistorier (1951)
- Tune – det første år (børnebog, 1951)
- Den unge Jægers lidelser (noveller, 1953)
- Tyren (digte, 1953)
- 19 Jægerviser (1953)
- Jomfruen fra Orléans, Jeanne d'Arc (biografi, 1955)
- Havkarlens sange (digte, 1956)
- Kapellanen og andre fortællinger (1957)
- Til en følsom Veninde. Udvalgte digte (1957)
- Velkommen, Vinter og andre essays (1958)
- Hvilket postbud – en due (hørespil, 1959)
- Cinna og andre digte (1959)
- Digte 1953-59 (1960)
- Fyrre Digte (1964)
- Pastorale. Pelsen (hørespil, 1964)
- Drømmen om en sommerdag og andre Essays (1965)
- Danskere. Tre Fortællinger af Fædrelandets Historier (fortællinger, 1966)
- Idylia (digte, 1967)
- Naive rejser (essays, 1968)
- Alvilda (essays & noveller, 1969)
- Årets ring (digte, 1969)
- Døden i skoven (noveller, 1970)
- Essays gennem ti Aar (1970)
- Hjemkomst (digte, 1970)
- Stå op og tænd ild (prosa, 1971)
- Udvalgte digte (1971)
- Provinser (noveller, 1972)
- S (roman, 1973)
- Udsigt til Kronborg (essays & noveller, 1976)

== Recognition ==
- Danish Critics Prize for Literature (Kritikerprisen) (1958)
- De gyldne laurbær (1959)
- Emil Aarestrup Medaillen (1960)
- Søren Gyldendal Prize (1962)
- Grand Prize of the Danish Academy (1969)
