= Ude og Hjemme =

Danish women's magazine

- Categories: Family magazine; Women's magazine
- Frequency: Weekly
- Publisher: Aller Press
- Founded: 1926
- First issue: 15 January 1926; 99 years ago
- Company: Aller Media
- Country: Denmark
- Based in: Copenhagen
- Language: Danish
- Website: Ude og Hjemme

Ude og Hjemme (Danish: Out and At Home) is a weekly general interest and women's magazine published in Copenhagen, Denmark. Founded in 1926 it is one of the oldest magazines in the country.

== History and profile ==
Ude og Hjemme was first published on 15 January 1926. The magazine was started by Alfa factories to market Alfa margarines. Peter Freuchen, a polar explorer, served as the editor-in-chief of the magazine from its start in 1926 to 1932. The magazine was owned by Alfa company until 1938 when it was acquired by A/S Danske Hjem, which sold it to Aller Media in January 1963.

The magazine is part of Aller Media and is published by Aller Press SA on a weekly basis. Its headquarters is in Copenhagen, and as of 2013 its editor-in-chief was Kaj Elgaard.

Ude og Hjemme offers articles on cooking, beauty products and home decoration. Its readers are young women who have a traditional life approach. The magazine published Phantom in its comics supplement until 1977.

== Circulation ==
In 1929 Ude og Hjemme reached a circulation of 100,000 copies. The magazine had a circulation of 178,059 copies in 1956. It was 154,764 copies in 1960 and 122,855 copies in 1964.

The circulation of Ude og Hjemme was 112,000 copies in 1967, 108 copies in 1968 and 105,000 copies in 1969. It rose to 114,002 copies in 1970, to 117,000 copies in 1971 and to 121,000 copies in 1972. Then it fell to 117,000 copies in 1973 and to 100,000 copies in 1974. Its circulation was 103,949 copies in 1975.

In 2001 Ude og Hjemme sold 178,000 copies. During the last six months of 2003 the magazine had a circulation of 177,000 copies, making it the fifth best-selling general interest magazine in the country. During the last six months of 2007 the circulation of the weekly was 166,400 copies. Its circulation was 142,575 copies in 2010. It fell to 129,627 copies in 2011 and to 117,733 copies in 2012. In 2013 its circulation further fell to 115,000 copies. The magazine sold 98,000 copies in 2014.

== See also ==
- List of magazines in Denmark
