= Johan Hansen (1838–1913) =

Danish shipowner

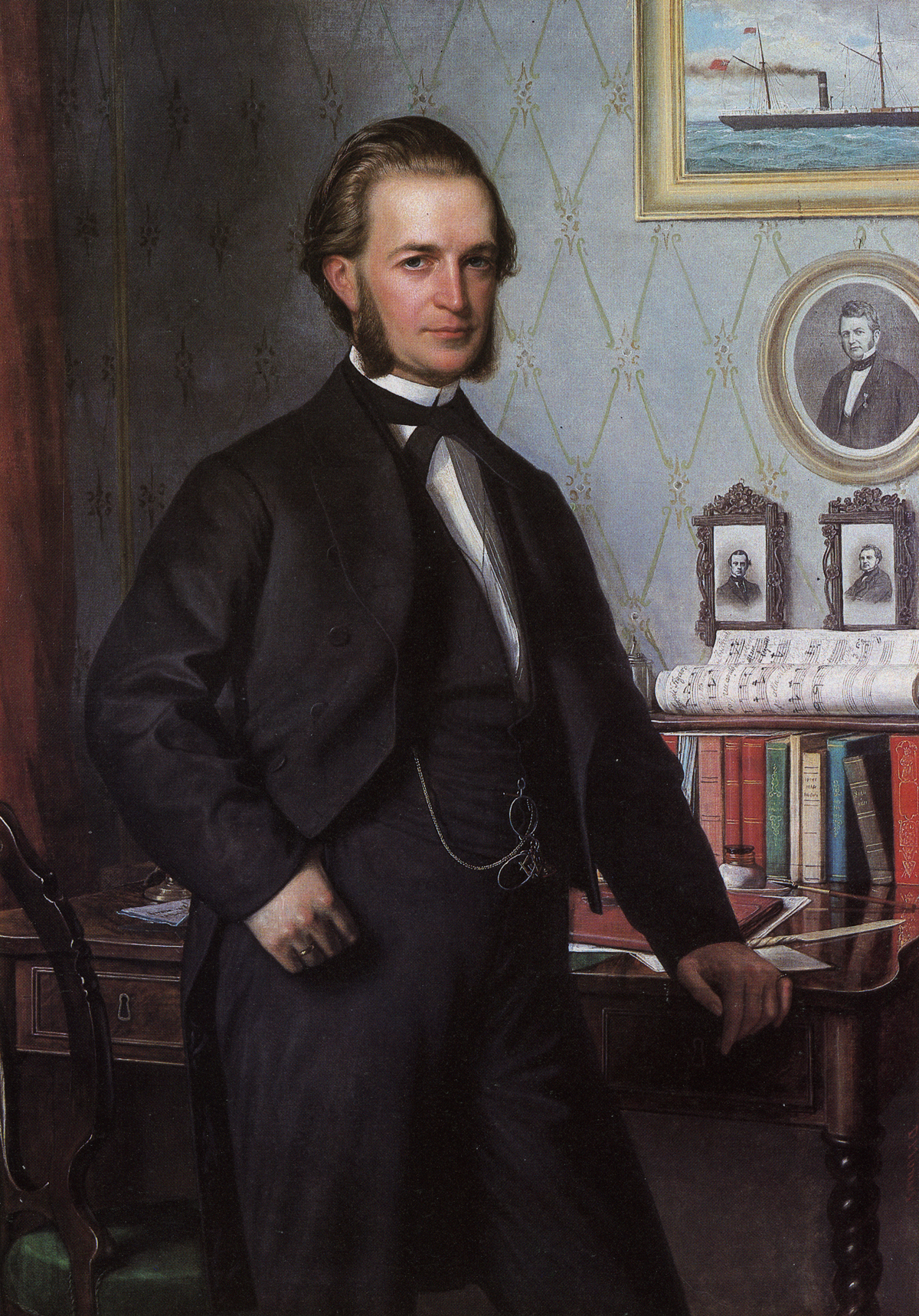
- Johan Hansen painted by Carl Bloch
- Born: 6 February 1838; Copenhagen, Denmark
- Died: 28 February 1913 (aged 75); Copenhagen, Denmark
- Resting place: Church of Holmen
- Occupation: Businessman
- Awards: Knight Cross of the Dannebrog

Johan Peter Christian Hansen (6 February 1838 - 28 February 1913) was a Danish businessman and art collector.

== Early life and education ==
Hansen was born in Copenhagen, the son of merchant C. K. Hansen (1813–68) and Cathrine Marie Pöhls (1814–95).

== Career ==
Just 19 years old Hansen was made an aqssocié in his father's company. When his father died in 1868, Hansen made their longterm employee Olof Hansen (1841–97) a partner in the company. The company grew under their management. In 1883 they founded the shipping company Dampskibsselskabet Dannebrog. It was followed by Dampskibsselskabet af 1896 (1896) and Dampskibsselskabet Neptun, (1901). Upon Oluf Hansen's death in 1897, Johan Hansen made his sons Johan Hansen (1861–1943) and Robert Hansen (1863–1912) partners.

== Art, music and philanthropy ==
Johan Hansen was interested in art and music. He was the owner of an extensive art collection.

He was also interested in music and had received training as a singer in Paris. He was a co-founder of Nordisk Musikforlag. He was active in the association Det gode Sindelag. He was consul-general for Austria-Hungary in 1872–1910.

== Personal life ==
On 18 January 1861, Hansen married Emma Hikins (9 November 1838 – 22 April 1919) in the Dotadel Church in Copenhagen. She was a daughter of Royal Naby engineer Samuel Hikins (1801–77) and Harriet Hikins (1803–77). -Far til Johan H. (1861–1943).

He was made a Knight in the Order of the Dannebrog in 1873 and was awarded the Cross of Honour in 1908.

He died in Copenhagen on 28 February 1039 and is buried in the Cemetery of Holmen.

== Rxtermal links ==
- Source
