= Bo Bedre =

Danish monthly lifestyle and interior design magazine

- Editor-in-chief: Erik Rimmer
- Categories: Interior design magazine
- Frequency: Monthly
- Publisher: Benjamin Media
- Founder: Palle Fogtdal
- First issue: 1 March 1961; 64 years ago
- Company: Bonnier Group
- Country: Denmark
- Based in: Frederiksberg, Copenhagen
- Language: Danish
- Website: Bo Bedre
- ISSN: 0006-5285
- OCLC: 464585407

Bo Bedre (Danish: Live Better) is a monthly lifestyle and interior design magazine published in Frederiksberg, Copenhagen, Denmark. It is the first interior design magazine in the country. The magazine has Norwegian and Finnish editions.

== History and profile ==
Bo Bedre was first published in March 1961, being the first magazine in its category in the region. Its founder is Palle Fogtdal. The magazine has been part of the Bonnier Group since 1983, and as of 2015 its editor-in-chief was Erik Rimmer who was appointed to the post in 2000. The publisher of the magazine is Benjamin Media.

The headquarters of Bo Bedre is in Frederiksberg, and the magazine is published monthly. From its start in 1961 to the end of the 1970s Bo Bedre targeted families. Then it began to target high-income groups. The magazine covers news on home interiors, foods, apparel, cars, jewellery, watches and personal care. In 2010 its readers were mainly women aged between 30 and 64.

== Editions ==
Bo Bedre has a Norwegian edition and a Finnish edition. The former was started in 2003 which offers content from the magazine. The Finnish edition, namely Divaani, also features content from Bo Bedre. It was launched in 2008. In March 2015 it was reported that the Danish-language edition of Bo Bedre would also be distributed in Japan.

== Circulation ==
Bo Bedre had a circulation of 78,000 copies in 2001. Between July and December 2003 its circulation was 80,000 copies. The magazine sold 87,600 copies in 2006. During the last six months of 2007 its circulation was 89,200 copies. It was 84,000 copies both in 2007 and in 2008.

During the first half of 2010 the monthly sold 78,072 copies. The circulation of the magazine was 75,002 copies in 2010 and 76,556 copies in 2011. It was 73,663 copies in 2012. Its circulation was 71,122 copies between July and December 2013. It was 72,000 copies for 2013 as a whole. Bo Bedre sold nearly 78,000 copies in 2014.

== See also ==
- List of magazines in Denmark
