= Heretica =

Danish literary magazine (1948–1953)

- Categories: Literary and cultural magazine
- Founded: 1948
- Final issue: 1953
- Country: Denmark
- Based in: Copenhagen
- Language: Danish
- OCLC: 265696256

Heretica was a conservative cultural and literary magazine published in Copenhagen, Denmark, from 1948 to 1953.

== History and profile ==
Heretica was established in 1948. One of the founders was Thorkild Bjørnvig. It was largely inspired by the British periodical The Criterion by T. S. Eliot. The magazine adopted an anti-ideological humanism approach. The magazine ended publication in 1953 and was succeeded by another magazine, Vindrosen.

== Contributors and content ==
Heretica was produced by the poets who looked for new reality challenging the conventional ideas of Christianity, humanism and communism. The magazine also covered the poems and writings of promising authors. One of these new writers were Poul Vad who started his literary career in the magazine in 1956. The contributors of the magazine were called the Heretica School members, who had conservative existentialist views. They included Jørgen Gustava Brandt, Benny Andersen, Per Højholt, Paul la Cour and Erik Knudsen.

The magazine was edited by the following Danish writers and poets: Thorkild Bjørnvig (volumes 1-2), Martin A. Hansen and Ole Wivel (volumes 3-4), and Frank Jæger and Tage Skou-Hansen (volumes 5-6).
