= Camillo Carlsen =

Danish composer

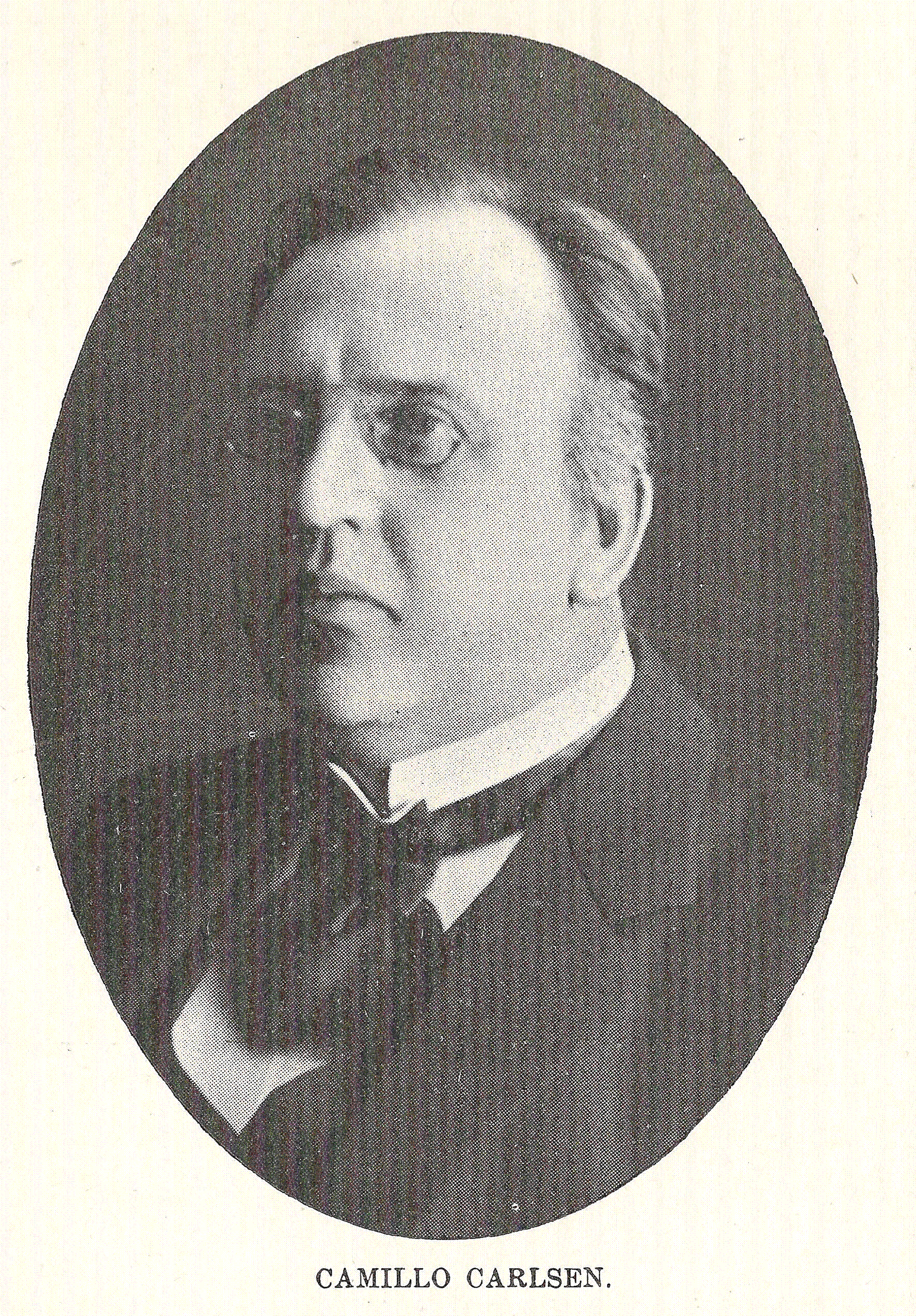
- Born: Camillo Alphonzo Johannes Peter Carlsen; 19 January 1876
- Died: 4 October 1948 (aged 72)
- Occupation: composer

Camillo Alphonzo Johannes Peter Carlsen (19 January 1876 – 4 October 1948) was a Danish composer. He composed music for two documentaries in 1942.

== Notable works ==
- Forår (sangcyklus 1895)
- Violinromance (1895)
- Strygekvartet nr. 1 i d-mol (1895)
- 8 Klaverstykker (1895)
- Sørgemusik ved Frederik d. VIIIs Bisættelse i Roskilde Domkirke (Adagio funèbre - violin, cello og orgel - 1912)
- Nocturne (orkester 1944)
- Berceuse (orkester 1944)
- Adagio funèbre (orkester 1945)
