= Dansk Familieblad =

Weekly family and entertainment magazine in Denmark (1910–1980)

- Categories: Family magazine; Entertainment magazine
- Frequency: Weekly
- First issue: 1910
- Final issue: 1980
- Company: Egmont Group (from 1963)
- Country: Denmark
- Based in: Copenhagen
- Language: Danish
- ISSN: 0011-6262
- OCLC: 466653070

Dansk Familieblad (Danish: Danish Family Magazine) was a weekly illustrated family and entertainment magazine which existed between 1910 and 1980.

== History and profile ==
Dansk Familieblad was founded as a weekly magazine in 1910. The founding editor of the magazine was Carl Bærentzen who was succeeded by Carl Rasmussen in the post in 1913. Rasmussen's tenure ended in 1925.

Dansk Familieblad contained materials which targeted families. It was acquired by the Egmont company in 1963. The magazine began to include entertainment-related content from 1970. One of the contributors was the Danish actress Vera Stricker who wrote in a regular column.

Dansk Familieblad merged with another weekly Hjemmet in 1980, and the new magazine was named as Stor Hjemmet.
