= Levende Billeder =

Film magazine in Denmark (1975–1997)

- Categories: Film magazine
- Frequency: Monthly
- Publisher: Foreningen Levende Billeder
- Founded: 1975
- First issue: April 1975
- Final issue: 1997
- Country: Denmark
- Language: Danish
- ISSN: 0108-5697
- OCLC: 1249945325

Levende Billeder (Danish: Live Pictures) was a film magazine in Denmark which was in circulation between 1975 and 1997. Its subtitle was et månedsblad om film og tv (Danish: a monthly magazine about film and television).

== History and profile ==
Levende Billeder was first published in April 1975. It was started as a successor to the film review magazine Kirke og Film which existed between 1945 and 1968. The publisher of Levende Billeder was Foreningen Levende Billeder. The magazine was subject to persistent financial problems during its run.

The magazine folded in 1997, and its license was sold to Politiken's film supplement.

== Editors-in-chief ==
The editors-in-chief of Levende Billeder were as follows:

- Flemming Behrendt (1975, issues 1–4)
- Henrik Jul Hansen (1975–1984)
- Jaffa Valentin (1984–1988 and 1991–1992)
- Thomas Alling (1988–1989)
- Peder Bundgaard (1989–1990)
- Trine Saabye (1992–1993)
- Per Juul Carlsen (1993–1995)
- Christian Monggaard (1995–1997)
