= Aschehoug (Egmont) =

Aschehoug was a Danish book publisher, first part of Aschehoug and later Egmont Group, a major Danish media corporation.

It was Denmark’s second largest publisher with a revenue of approximately EUR 55 million (2003) and with a strong schoolbook publisher, Alinea, as part of the publishing house. With its schoolbook publisher Alinea and Forlag Malling Beck, Aschehoug command a strong position in the market for educational materials for Danish elementary and lower secondary schools.

== History ==
In 1908, the Norwegian publishing house Aschehoug expanded with a branch in Copenhagen. In 1926 this branch became Aschehoug Dansk Forlag. In 1961, it was incorporated into the Egmont Group. In the 1990s it was known for its many biographies and memoirs among a wide range of publication types. In 2006, the publishing house had 160 employees and a turnover of DKK 470 million. DKK annually. In 2007, Egmont acquired the Danish publishing business of the Swedish Bonnier Group. On that occasion, Aschehoug merged them under the name Lindhardt og Ringhof.
