= Ejler Andreas Jorgensen =

Danish-American painter

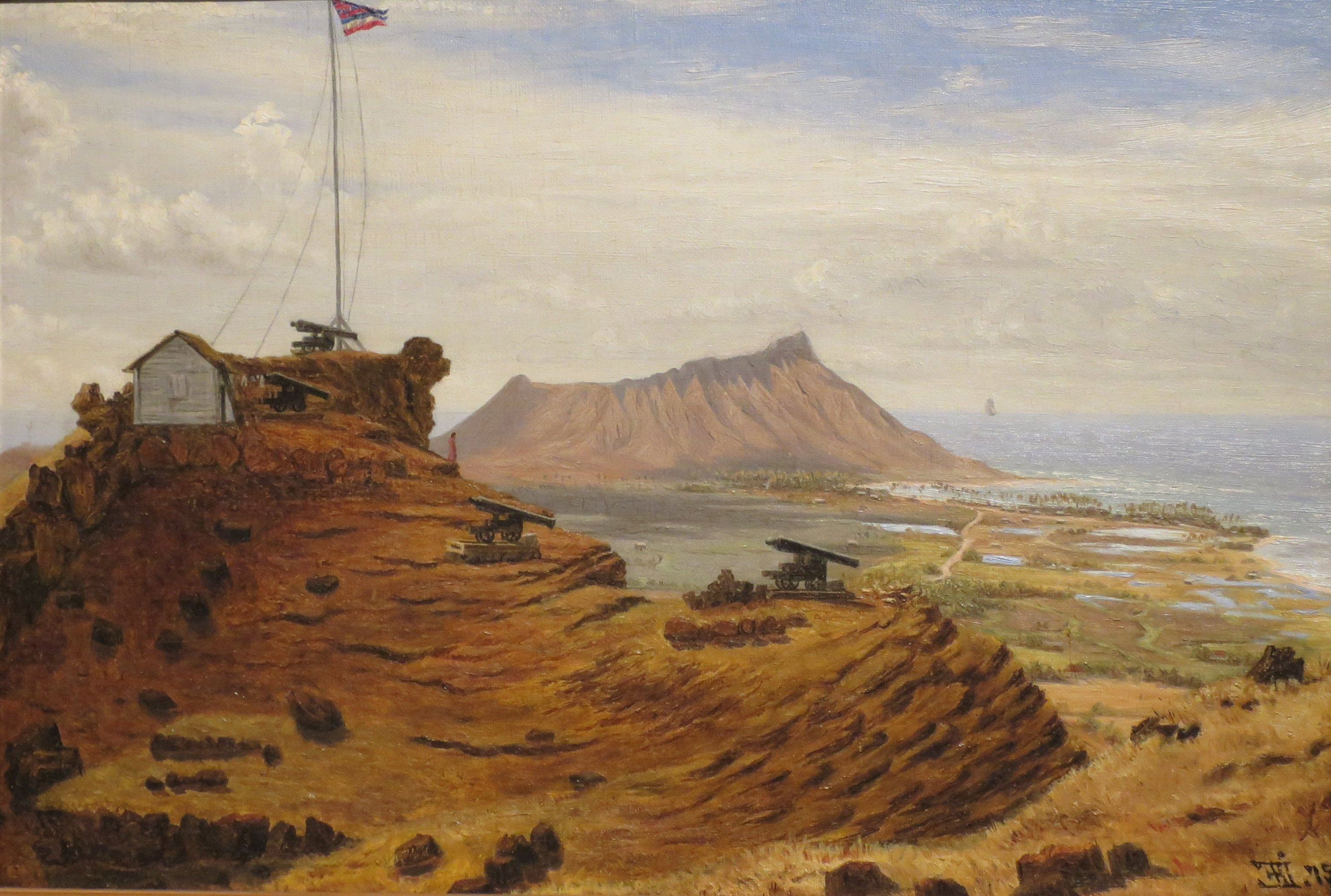
View of Honolulu from Punchbowl (1875) oil on canvas painting Honolulu Museum of Art

Ejler Andreas Christoffer Jorgensen a.k.a. Eiler Jørgensen (July 16, 1838 – December 17, 1876) was a Danish-born American landscape and portrait painter.

== Biography ==
Eiler Jørgensen was born in Sømme Herred in Roskilde, Denmark. He was the eldest son of parish priest Søren Hillerup Jørgensen (1806-1847) and Conradine van Deurs (1812-1890). He was a student at the Royal Danish Academy of Fine Arts (Det Kongelige Danske Kunstakademi) in Copenhagen (1860). He relocated to the United States in 1873. He was professionally active in San Francisco in the 1870s. Jorgensen painted in Hawaii in 1875. He died in Oakland, California in 1876.

The Honolulu Museum of Art holds work by Ejler Andreas Jorgensen. Jorgensen signed some of his paintings "Chris Jorgensen", but should not be confused with the American-born painter of landscapes, missions, and marine scenes, Chris Jorgensen (1860–1935).

== Other sources ==
- Ellis, George R. and Marcia Morse (2000) A Hawaii Treasury, Masterpieces from the Honolulu Academy of Arts (Tokyo: Asahi Shimbun, pages 147, 223)
- Forbes, David W. (1992) Encounters with Paradise: Views of Hawaii and its People, 1778-1941 (Honolulu Academy of Arts, page 167)
