= Johan Peter Andreas Anker =

Danish military officer (1838–1876)

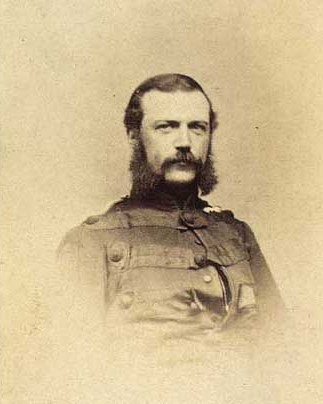
Johan Anker

Johan Peter Andreas Anker (22 February 1838 – 27 January 1876) was a Danish military officer born in Knudsker Sogn.

He made his mark during the Second Schleswig War, especially in the Battle of Dybbøl of 1864. He retired in 1865.
