= Philip Schou =

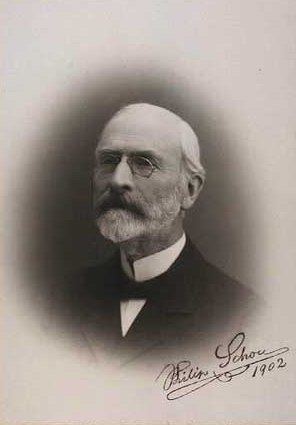
Schou photographed by H. J. Barby in 1892

Philip Julius Schou (10 July 1838 – 19 September 1922) was a Danish businessman and industrialist. He was a pioneer of the Danish ceramics industry as the manager of Aluminia and the Royal Copenhagen Porcelain Factory.

== Early life and education ==
Schou was born on 10 July 1838 in Slagelse, the son of Hans Henrik S. (1797–1870) and Martine Hedevig Hansen (1798–1853). He matriculated in 1857 from Siró Academy. He graduated from the College of Advanced Technology in 1862. He was the younger brother of military officer and owner of Antvorskov Theodor Schou.

== Personal life ==
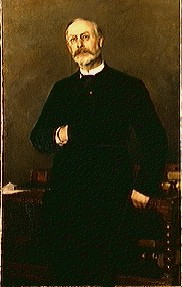
Schou painted by Bertha Wegmann, 1888

On 8 August 1862, Schou married Clara Olavia Maria Buch (1839–1926). She was the daughter of dyer Ebbe Johansen Bech and Sine Marie Jørgensen. He was the father of landscape painter Svend Schou.

Schou is one of the men seen in Peder Severin Krøyer's monumental 1904 oil-on-canbas group portrait painting Men of Industry. He died on 19 September 1922 and is buried in Frederiksberg Old Cemetery.

== Awards ==
Schou was awarded the title of etatsråd in 1890 and konferensråd in 1906. He was created a Knight of the Order of the Dannebrog in 1880 and a commander of the Second Class in 1888. In 1897, he was awarded the Cross of Honour.
