= 1763 in Denmark =

- Decades: 1740s; 1750s; 1760s; 1770s; 1780s
- See also: Other events of 1763; List of years in Denmark

Events from the year 1763 in Denmark.

== Incumbents ==
- Monarch – Frederick V
- Prime minister – Johan Ludvig Holstein-Ledreborg (until 29 January), Count Johann Hartwig Ernst von Bernstorff

== Events ==
- 4–15 April – A British siege of Frederiksnagore results in a brief occupation of the Danish trading post in India.
- 16 April – HDMS Prindsesse Sophia Magdalenaø is launched at Nyholm in Copenhagen.

== Births ==
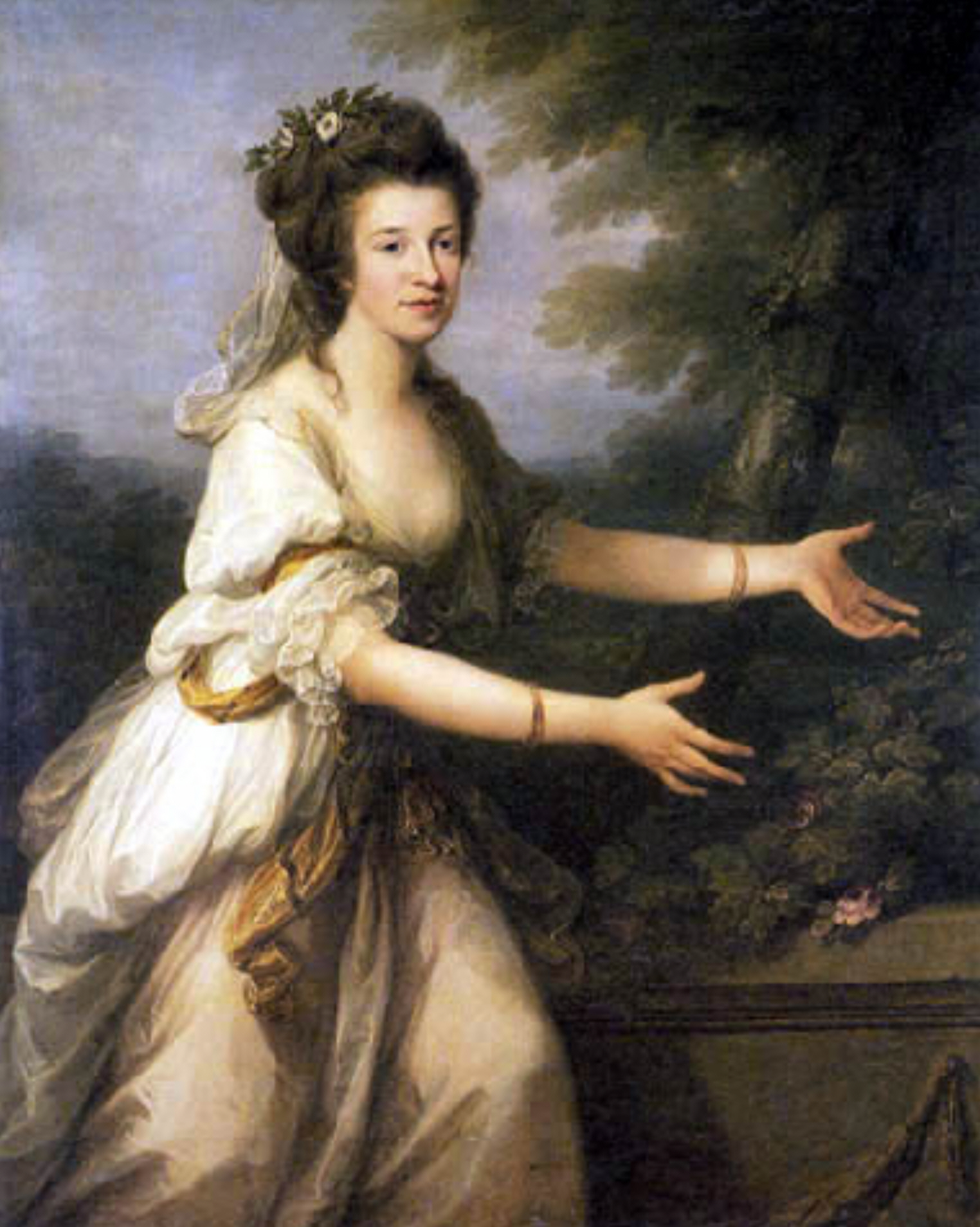
Julie Reventlow.

- 16 February – Julie Reventlow, countess, writer and salonist (died 1816)
- 4 March – Hans Christian Knudsen, actor (died 1816)
- 18 March — Marie Christine Björn, ballet dancer (died 1837)
- 17 August – Peter Schousboe, botanist (died 1832)
- 4 September– Caspar Conrad Rafn, county governor (died 1830)

== Deaths ==
Johan Ludvig Holstein.

- 29 January – Johan Ludvig Holstein, statesman (born 1694)
- 4 March – Johan Hörner, painter (born 1711)
- 25 May – Frederik Christian von Haven, philologist, theologian and patron of the arts (born 1728)
- 1 December – Jacob Fosie, painter (born 1679)
- 3 December – Carl August Thielo, composer. theatre entrepreneur, music teacher, organist (born 1707)
