= 1764 in Denmark =

- Decades: 1740s; 1750s; 1760s; 1770s; 1780s
- See also: Other events of 1764; List of years in Denmark

Events from the year 1764 in Denmark.

== Incumbents ==
- Monarch – Frederick V
- Prime minister – Count Johann Hartwig Ernst von Bernstorff

== Events ==
- 12 April – HDMS Prindsesse Wilhelmine Carolina is launched at Nyholm in Copenhagen.

== Births ==
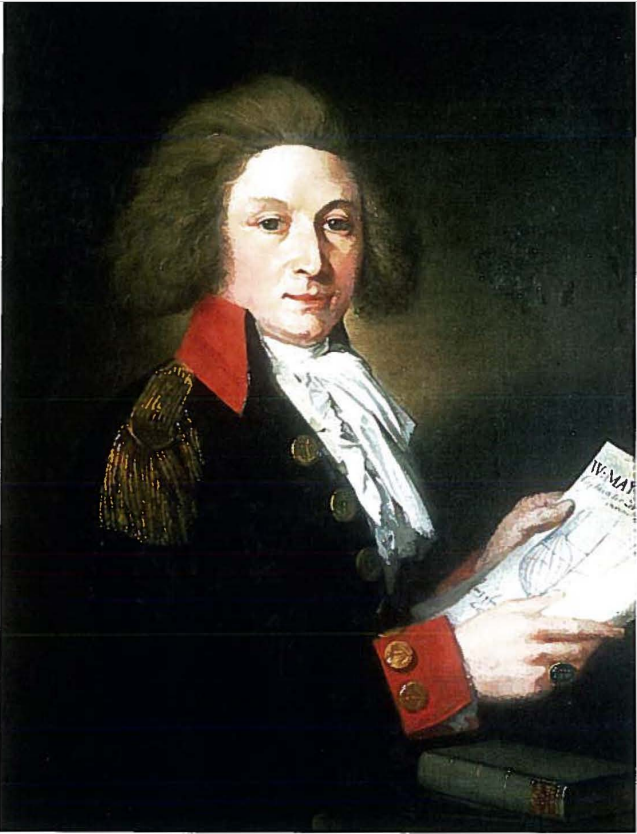
Frantza Hohlenberg.

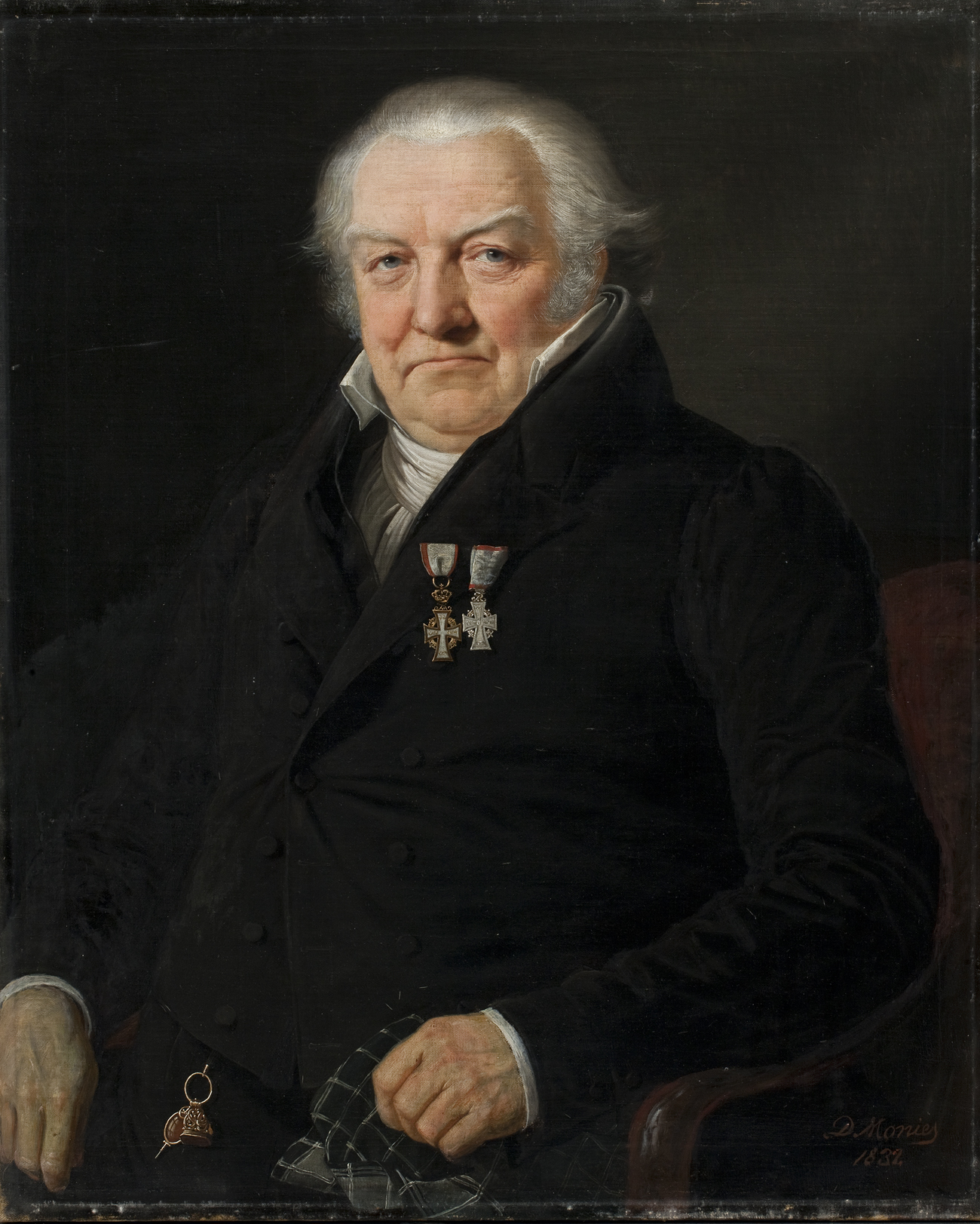
Johan Daniel Herholdt,

=== January–March ===
- 15 February – Jens Immanuel Baggesen, poet 1826)
- 17 February – Frantz Hohlenberg, naval officer (died 1804)
- 20 February – {Gebhard Moltke, civil servant (died 1854)

=== April–June ===
- 14 April – Poul Christian Stemann, government official and landowner (died 1855)
- 20 April – Rasmus Langeland Bagger, chief of police, burgermaster (died 1819)

=== July–September ===
- 27 July – Christiane Koren, poet and diarist (died 1815 in Norway)
- 10 July
  - Carl Wilhelm Jessen, naval officer (died 1823)
  - Johan Daniel Herholdt, physician (died 1836)
- 26 July – Frederik Adeler, lord president of Copenhagen (died 1816)
- 22 August – Mathias Sommerhielm, politician (died 1827)

== Deaths ==
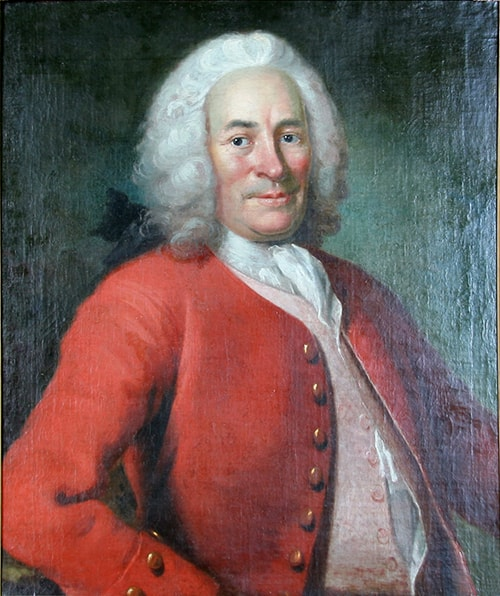
Erik Torm.

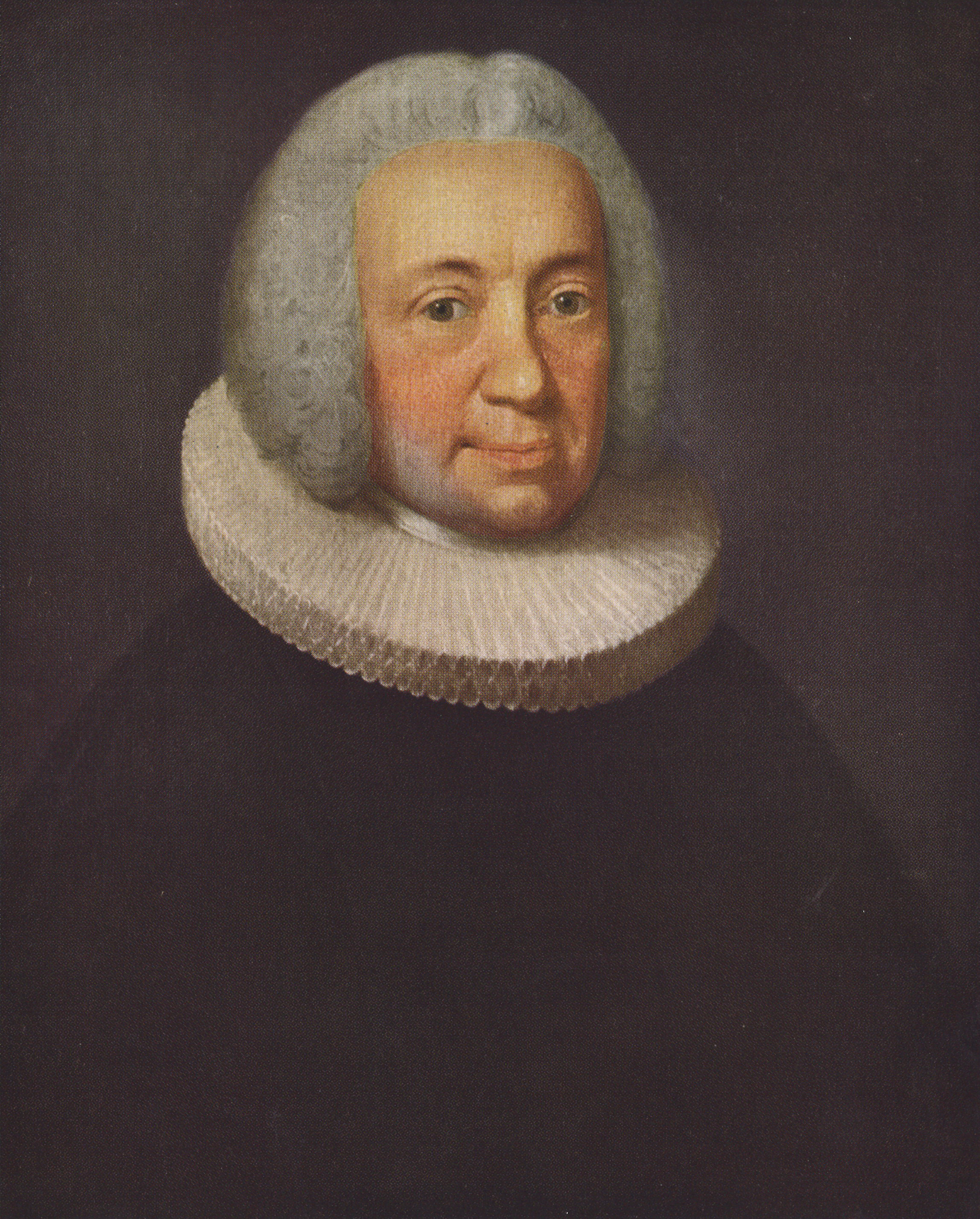
Hans Adolph Brorson-

=== January–March ===
- 15 January – Wilhelm August von der Osten, civil servant (born 1697)
- 2 February – Erik Torm, burgermaster and chief of police in Copenhagen (born 1684)

=== April–June ===
- 15 April – Peder Horrebow, astronomer (born 1679)
- 3 June - Hans Adolph Brorson, bishop and hymn writer (born 1694)
- 5 June – Jens Schielderup Sneedorff, author, professor of political science and royal teacher (born 1724)

=== July–September ===
- 23 August – Johanna Marie Fosie, first professional female Danish painter (born 1726)

=== October–December ===
- 20 December – Erik Pontoppidan, author, bishop, historian and antiquary (born 1698)
