= 1816 in Denmark =

- Decades: 1790s; 1800s; 1810s; 1820s; 1830s
- See also: Other events of 1816; List of years in Denmark

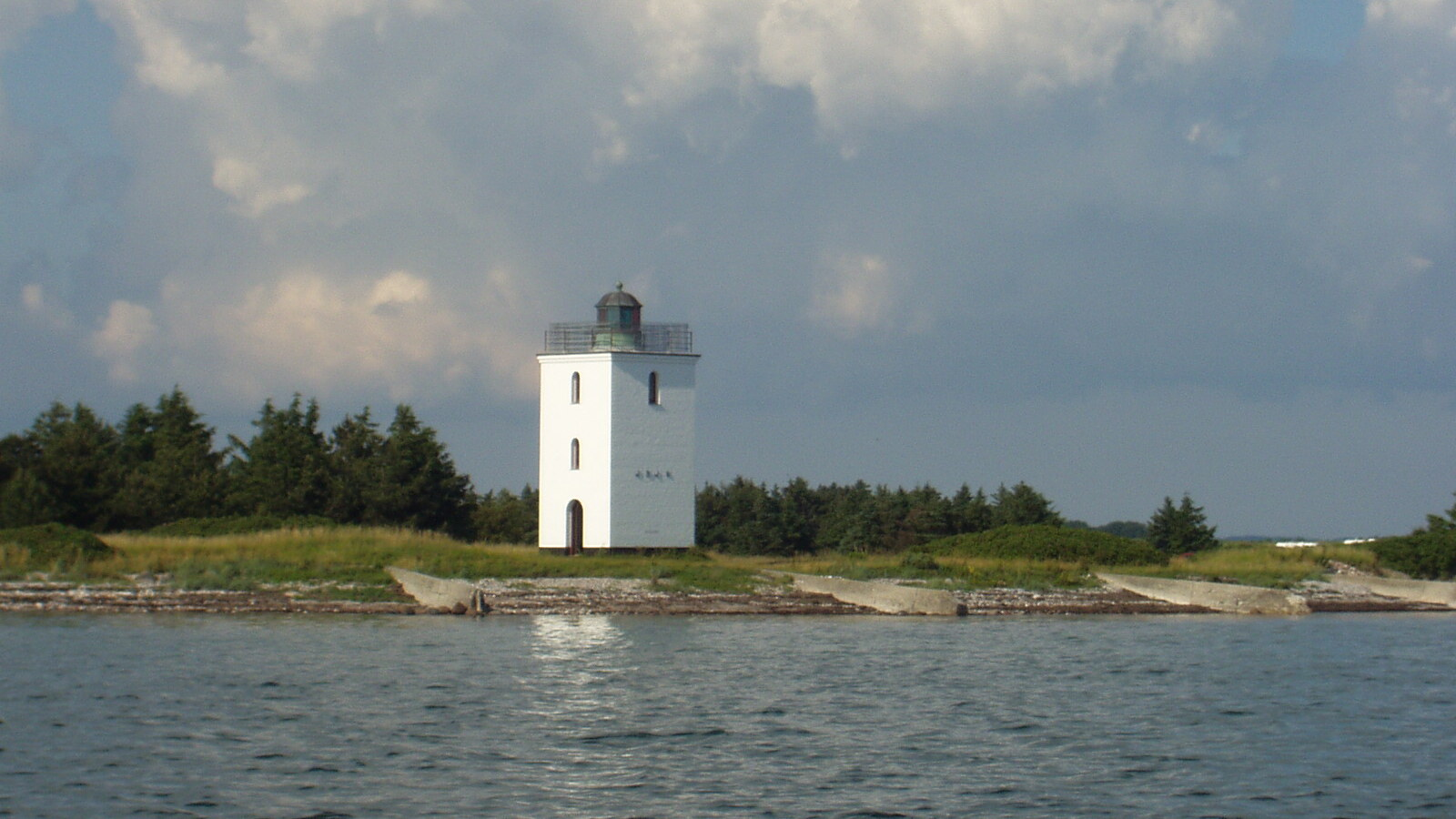
Lighthouse of Baagø

Events from the year 1816 in Denmark.

== Incumbents ==
- Monarch – Frederick VI
- Prime minister – Joachim Godske Moltke

== Births ==
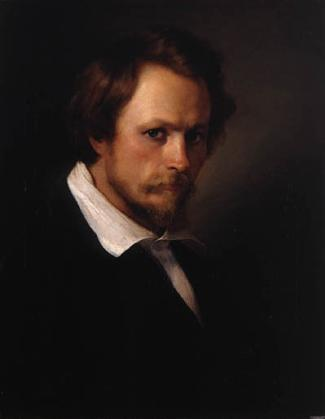
Jens Adolf Jerichau.

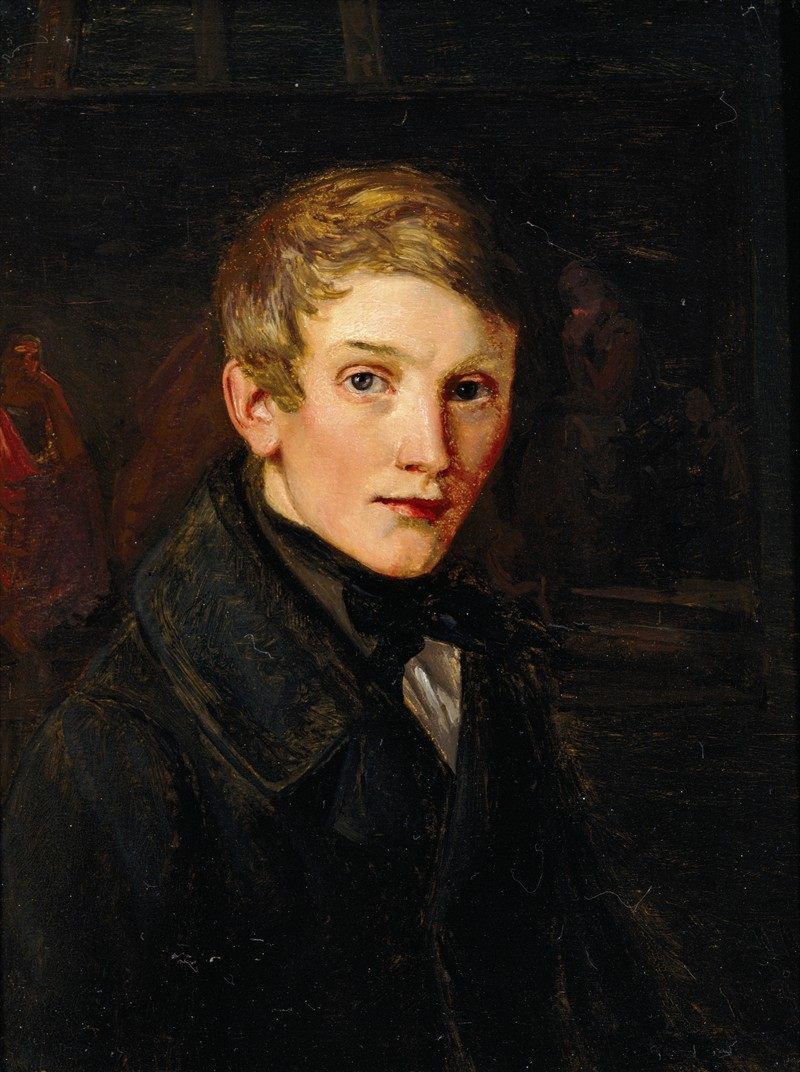
Dankvart Dreyer.

=== January–March ===
- 21 January – Louise Phister, actress (d. 1914)
- 7 March – Catharine Simonsen, soprano (d. 1849)
- 29 March – Christen Mikkelsen Kold, teacher who founded a school in Ryslinge that later became a model for the Danish folk high-school system (d. 1870)

=== April–June ===
- 13 April – Gottlieb Abrahamson Gedalia, banker (d. 1892)
- 17 April – Jens Adolf Jerichau, sculptor (d. 1883)
- 13 June – Dankvart Dreyer, painter (died 1852)
- 21 June – Anders Sandøe Ørsted, botanist, mycologist, zoologist and marine biologist (d. 1872)
- 22 June – Moritz G. Melchior, businessman (d. 1884)

=== July–September ===
- 11 July – Christian Albrecht von Benzon, painter (d. 1849)
- 7 August – Carit Etlar, author (d. 1900)

=== October–December ===
- 4 October – Rudolph Striegler, photographer (d. 1876)
- 3 December – Johannes Theodor Reinhardt, zoologist (d. 1882)
- 8 December – Edvard Helsted, composer (d. 1900)

== Deaths ==
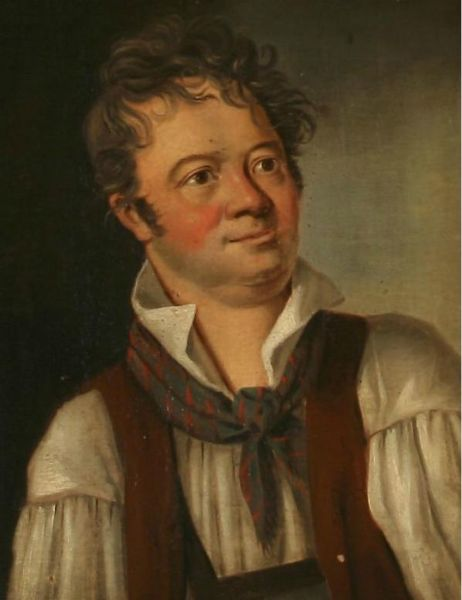
Hans Christian Knudsen.

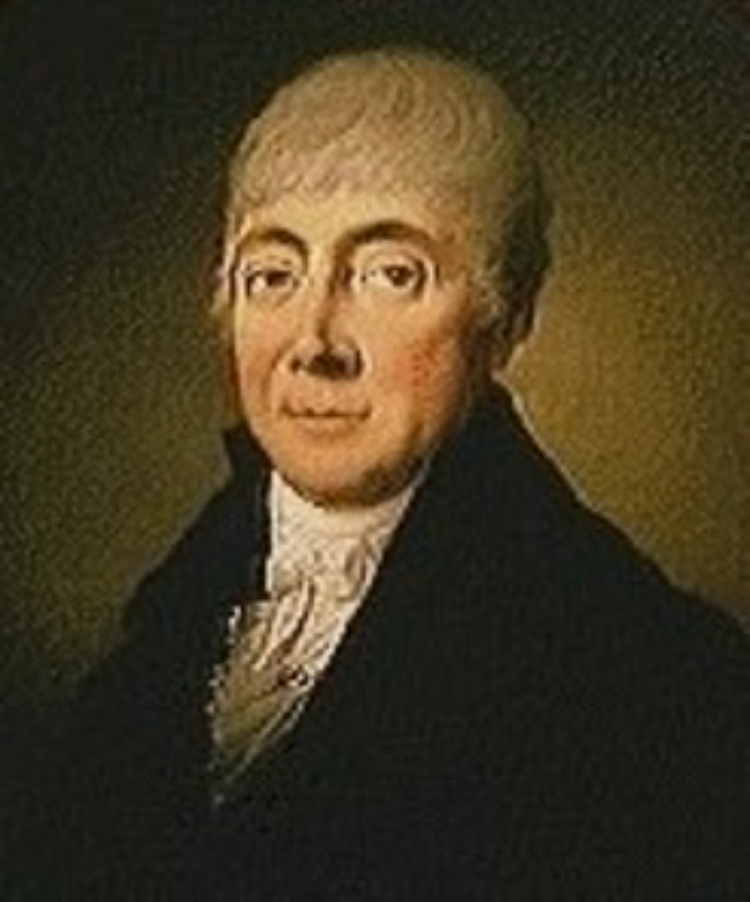
Hartvig Marcus Frisch.

=== January–March ===
- 4 March – Hans Christian Knudsen, actor (b. 1763)

=== April–June ===
- 11 April – Jørgen Thomsen Bech, businessman (b. 1731)

=== July–September ===
- 24 July – Christian Gottlieb Kratzenstein Stub, painter (b. 1783)
- 22 August – Hartvig Marcus Frisch, civil servant (b. 1754)
- 30 August – Niels Bang, landowner (b. 1776)

=== October–December ===
- 2 December – Charlotte Schimmelmann, Norwegian-born salonist and patron (b. 1757)
- 16 December – Vincenzo Galeotti, ballet master (b. 1733 in Italy)
- 28 December – Julie Reventlow, countess, writer and salonist (b. 1763)
