= Hans Knudsen =

Hans Knudsen may refer to:

- Hans Knudsen (canoeist), Danish canoeist
- Hans Knudsen (painter), Danish painter
- Hans Christian Knudsen (missionary), Norwegian missionary and painter
- Hans Christian Knudsen, Danish actor
- Hans Knudsen (writer) (1886–1971), German writer
