= Vester Skerninge =

- Town
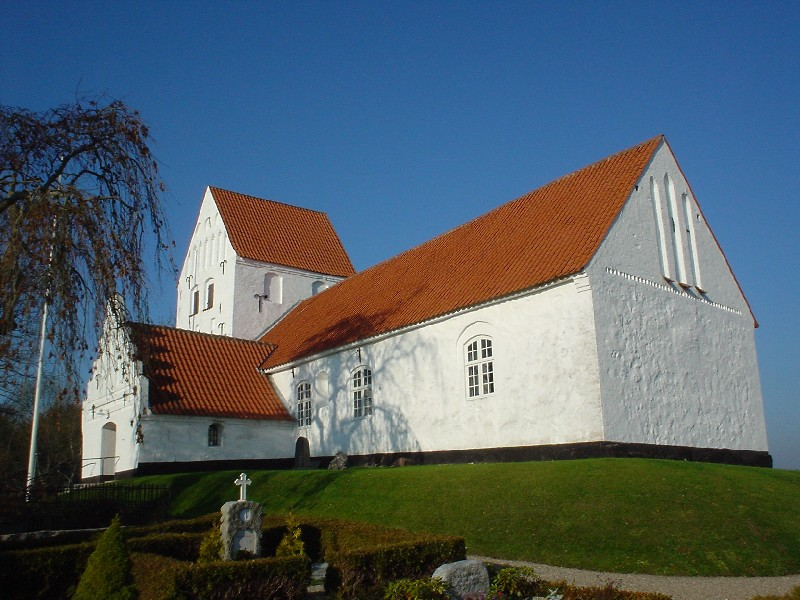
- Vester Skerninge Church

- Location in the Region of Southern Denmark
- Coordinates: 55°4′27″N 10°27′29″E
- Country: Denmark
- Region: Southern Denmark
- Municipality: Svendborg

Area
  - Urban: 0.92 km^{2} (0.36 sq mi)

Population (2026)
  - Urban: 1,107
  - Urban density: 1,200/km^{2} (3,100/sq mi)
- Time zone: UTC+1 (CET)
  - Summer (DST): UTC+2 (CEST)

Vester Skerninge is a town located on the island of Funen in south-central Denmark, in Svendborg Municipality.

The town was the seat of Egebjerg Municipality prior to the municipal reform in 2007, when it merged into the Svendborg Municipality.

== Notable people ==
- Frederik Christian von Haven (1728 in Vester Skerninge – 1763 in Yemen) was a Danish philologist and theologian who took part in (and died on) the Danish expedition to Yemen, which began in 1761
