= Herholdt =

Herholdt is a first name and surname. Notable people with the first name and surname include:

- Frank Herholdt (born 1945), South African photographer
- Holger Henrik Herholdt Drachmann (1846–1908), Danish poet
- Johan Daniel Herholdt (1818–1902), Danish architect, professor, and royal building inspector
- Johan Daniel Herholdt (physician) (1764–1836), Danish medical doctor
- Sonja Herholdt (born 1952), South African singer-songwriter and actress
