= Rosenvinge =

Rosenvinge is a surname, and may refer to:

- Rosenvinge (noble family), a Danish and Norwegian noble family since 1505
- Carina Rosenvinge Christiansen (born 1991), Danish archer
- Christina Rosenvinge (born 1964), Spanish singer-songwriter
- Janus Lauritz Andreas Kolderup-Rosenvinge (1792 – 1850), Danish jurist
- Lauritz Kolderup Rosenvinge (1858–1939), Danish botanist and phycologist
- Mette Rosenvinge (born 1942), Norwegian speed skater
