= 1698 in Denmark =

- Decades: 1670s; 1680s; 1690s; 1700s; 1710s
- See also: Other events of 1698; List of years in Denmark

Events from the year 1698 in Denmark

== Incumbents ==
- Monarch – Christian V

== Events ==
- 1 July – Den Københavnske Post-Rytter, a weekly newspaper, is published for the first time.

=== Full date missing ===
- Danmarksnagore becomes part of Danish India.
- Ny Hollænderby (now Frederiksberg) is destroyed by fire.
- Vodroffgård is established on the west side of St. Jørgen's Lake outside Copenhagen.

== Births ==
- 24 August – Erik Pontoppidan, author, bishop, historian and antiquary (died 1764)
- 25 December – Jens Høysgaard, philologist (died 1773)

== Deaths ==
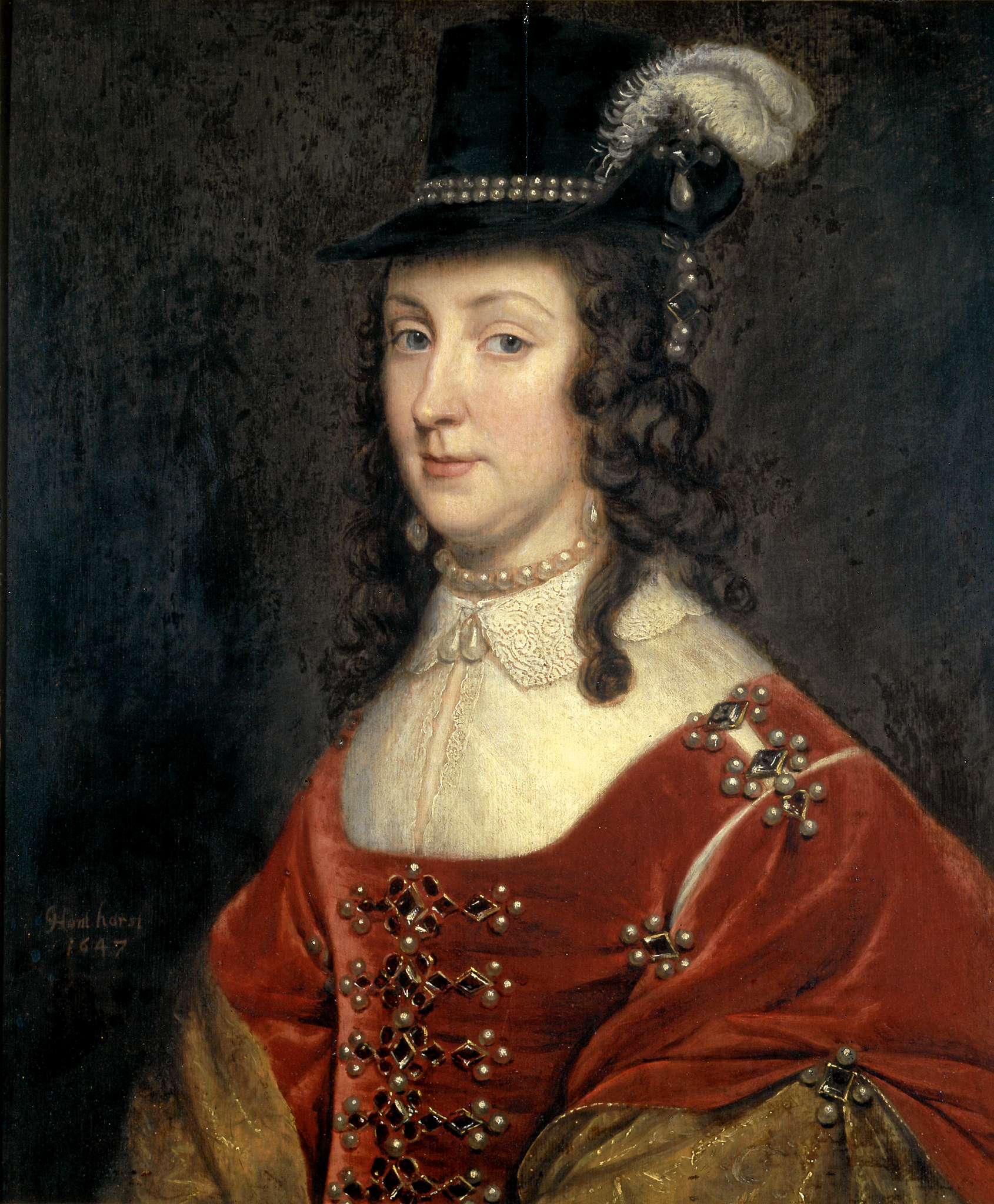
Leonora Christina Ulfeldt.

- 16 March – Leonora Christina Ulfeldt, noblewoman and writer (born 1621)
- 6 October – Erik Tylleman, governors of the Danish Gold Coast (born unknown)
- 4 November – Rasmus Bartholin, scientist (born 1625)
