= Carsten Niebuhr =

German mathematician, cartographer and explorer (1733–1815)

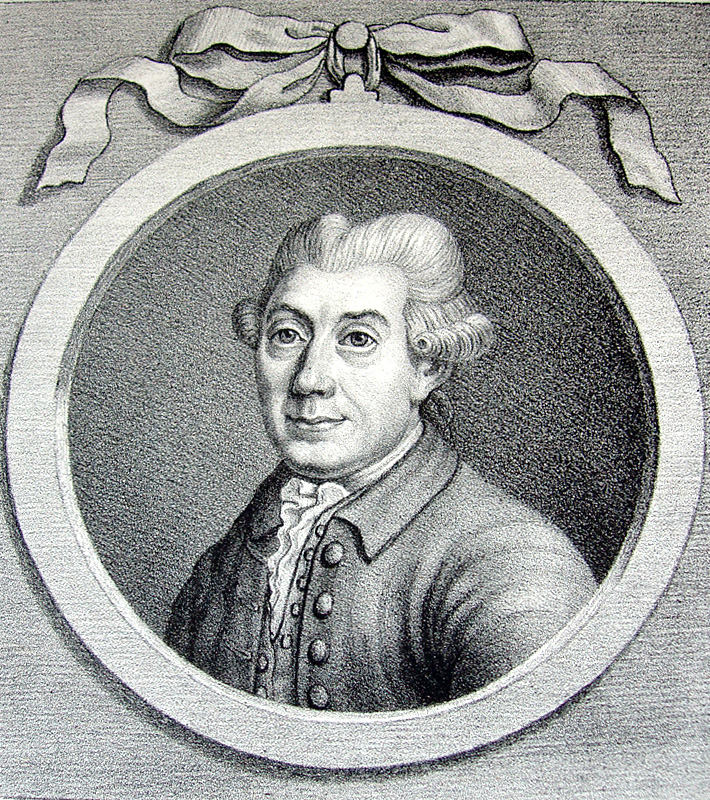
- Born: 17 March 1733; Lüdingworth, Bremen-Verden
- Died: 26 April 1815 (aged 82); Meldorf, Dithmarschen
- Occupations: Mathematician, cartographer, and explorer
- Known for: Danish Arabia expedition (1761-1767)

Carsten Niebuhr or Karsten Niebuhr (17 March 1733 – 26 April 1815) was a German mathematician, cartographer, and explorer in the service of Denmark-Norway. He is renowned for participating in the Danish Arabia Expedition (1761–1767) and for publishing the first Hausa language vocabulary in Latin script, in collaboration with the Tripolitan diplomat Abd al-Rahman Aga.

He was the father of the Danish-German statesman and historian Barthold Georg Niebuhr, who published an account of his father's life in 1817.

== Early life and education ==
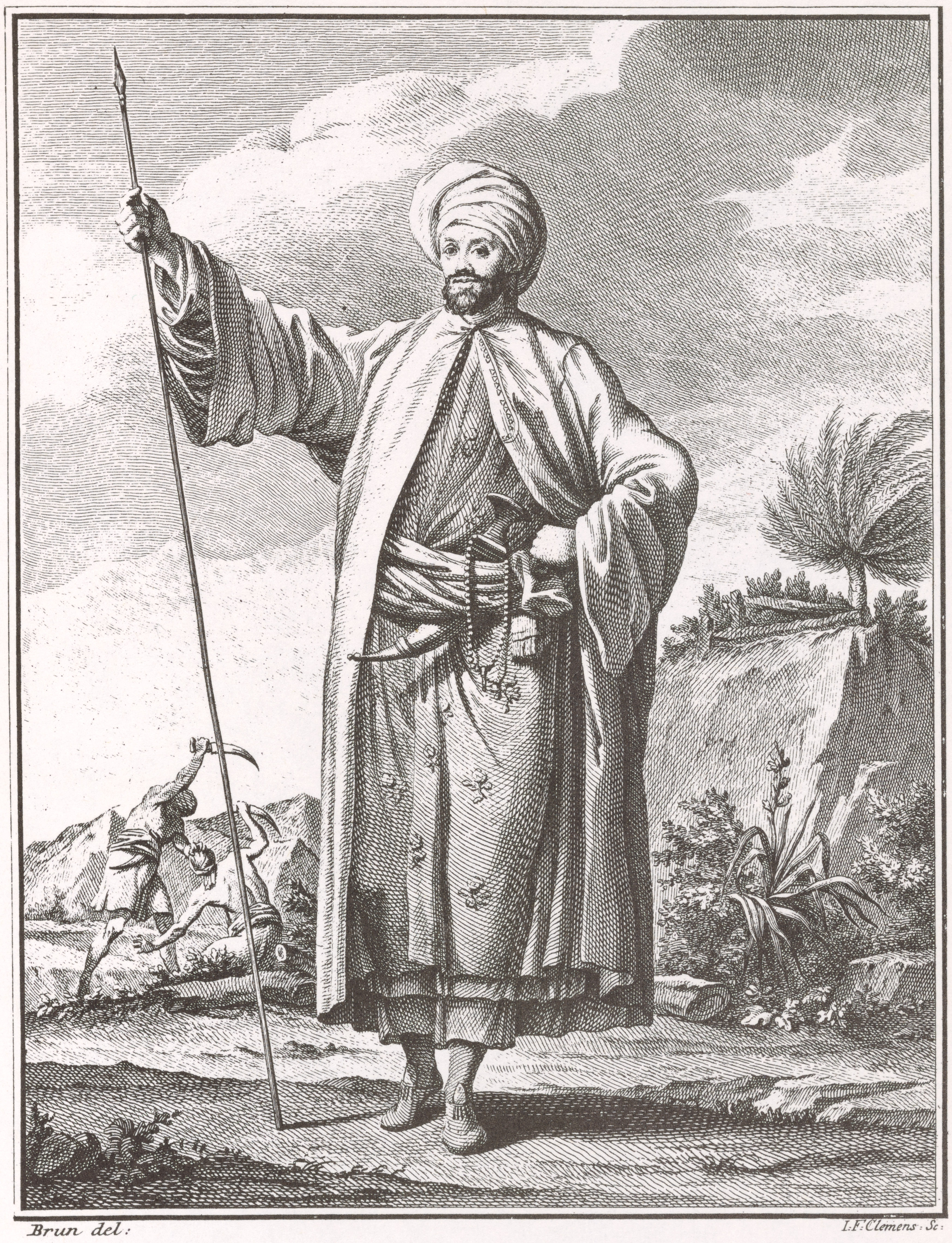
Carsten Niebuhr in the attire of a distinguished Arab in Yemen, gift from al-Mahdi Abbas, Imam of Yemen

Niebuhr was born in Lüdingworth (now a part of Cuxhaven, Lower Saxony) in what was then Bremen-Verden. His father Barthold Niebuhr (1704-1749) was a successful farmer and owned his own property. Carsten and his sister were educated at home by a local school teacher, then he attended the Latin School in Otterndorf, near Cuxhaven.

Originally Niebuhr had intended to become a surveyor, but in 1757 he went to the Georgia Augusta University of Göttingen, at this time Germany's most progressive institution of higher education. Niebuhr was probably a bright student because in 1760 Johann David Michaelis (1717-1791) recommended him as a participant in the Danish Arabia expedition (1761-1767), mounted by Frederick V of Denmark (1722–1766). For a year and a half before the expedition Niebuhr studied mathematics, cartography and navigational astronomy under Tobias Mayer (1723–1762), one of the premier astronomers of the 18th century, and the author of the Lunar Distance Method for determining longitude. Niebuhr's observations during the Arabia Expedition proved the accuracy and the practicality of this method for use by mariners at sea.

== Expeditions ==
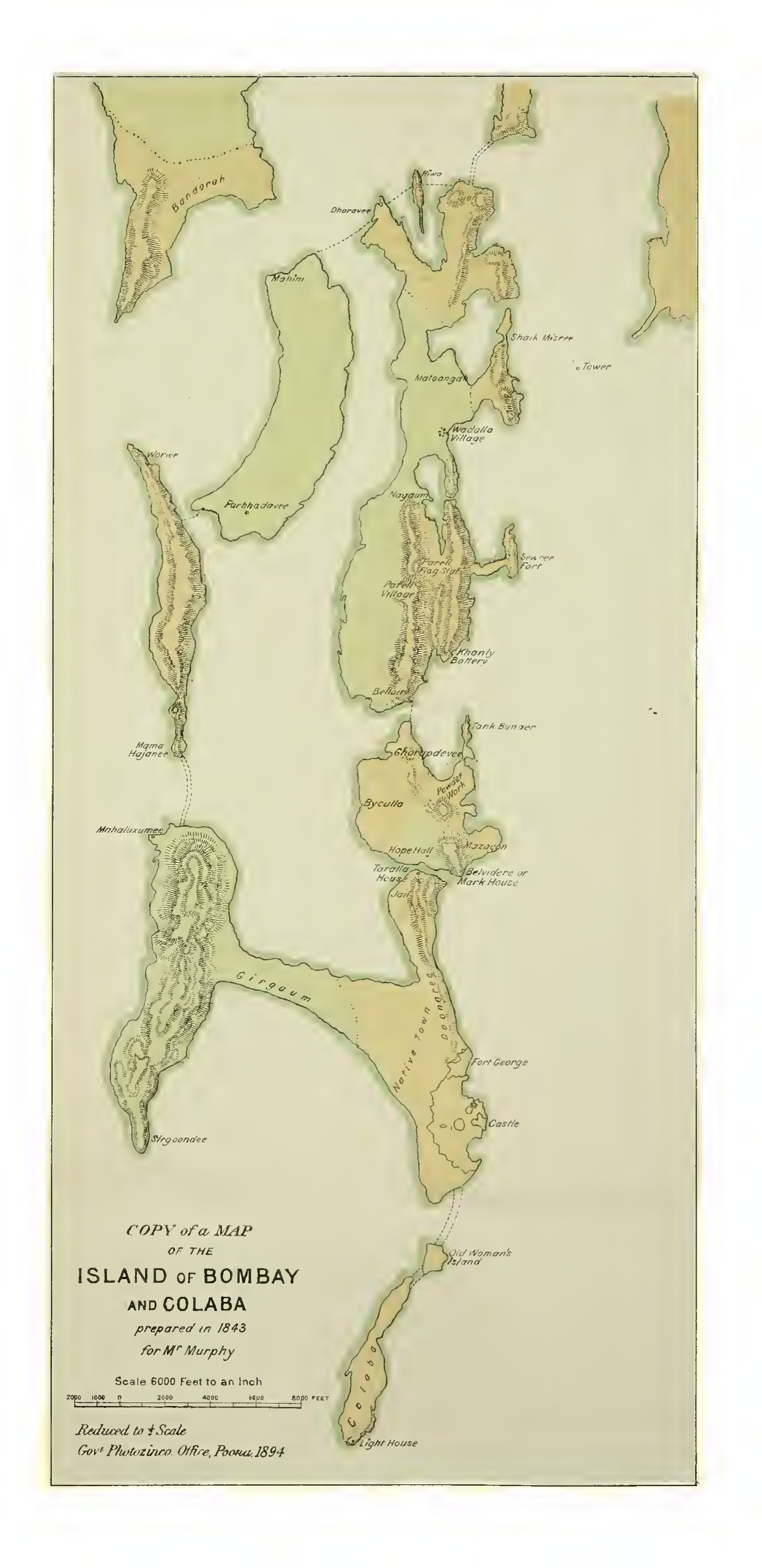
Map of Bombay prepared by Niebuhr

The expedition sailed in January 1761 via Marseille and Malta to Istanbul and Alexandria. Then the members of the expedition visited Cairo and Sinai, before traversing the Red Sea via Jiddah to Yemen, which was their main destination.

In Mokha, on 25 May 1763, the expedition's philologist, Frederik Christian von Haven, died, and on 11 July 1763, on the way to Sanaa, the capital of Yemen, its naturalist Peter Forsskål also died.

In Sanaa the remaining members of the expedition had an audience with the Imam of Yemen al-Mahdi Abbas (1719–1775), but suffered from the climate and returned to Mokha. Niebuhr seems to have preserved his own life and restored his health by adopting native dress and eating native food.

From Mokha the expedition continued to Bombay, the expedition's artist Georg Wilhelm Baurenfeind died on the 29th of August and the expedition's servant Lars Berggren on the following day; both were buried at sea. The surgeon Christian C. Kramer (1732–1763) also died, soon after landing in Bombay. Niebuhr was the only surviving member. He stayed in Bombay for fourteen months and then returned home by way of Muscat, Bushire, Shiraz, and Persepolis. His copies of the cuneiform inscriptions at Persepolis proved to be a key turning-point in the decipherment of cuneiform, and the birth of Assyriology.

His transcriptions were especially useful to Georg Friedrich Grotefend, who made the first correct decipherments of Old Persian cuneiform:

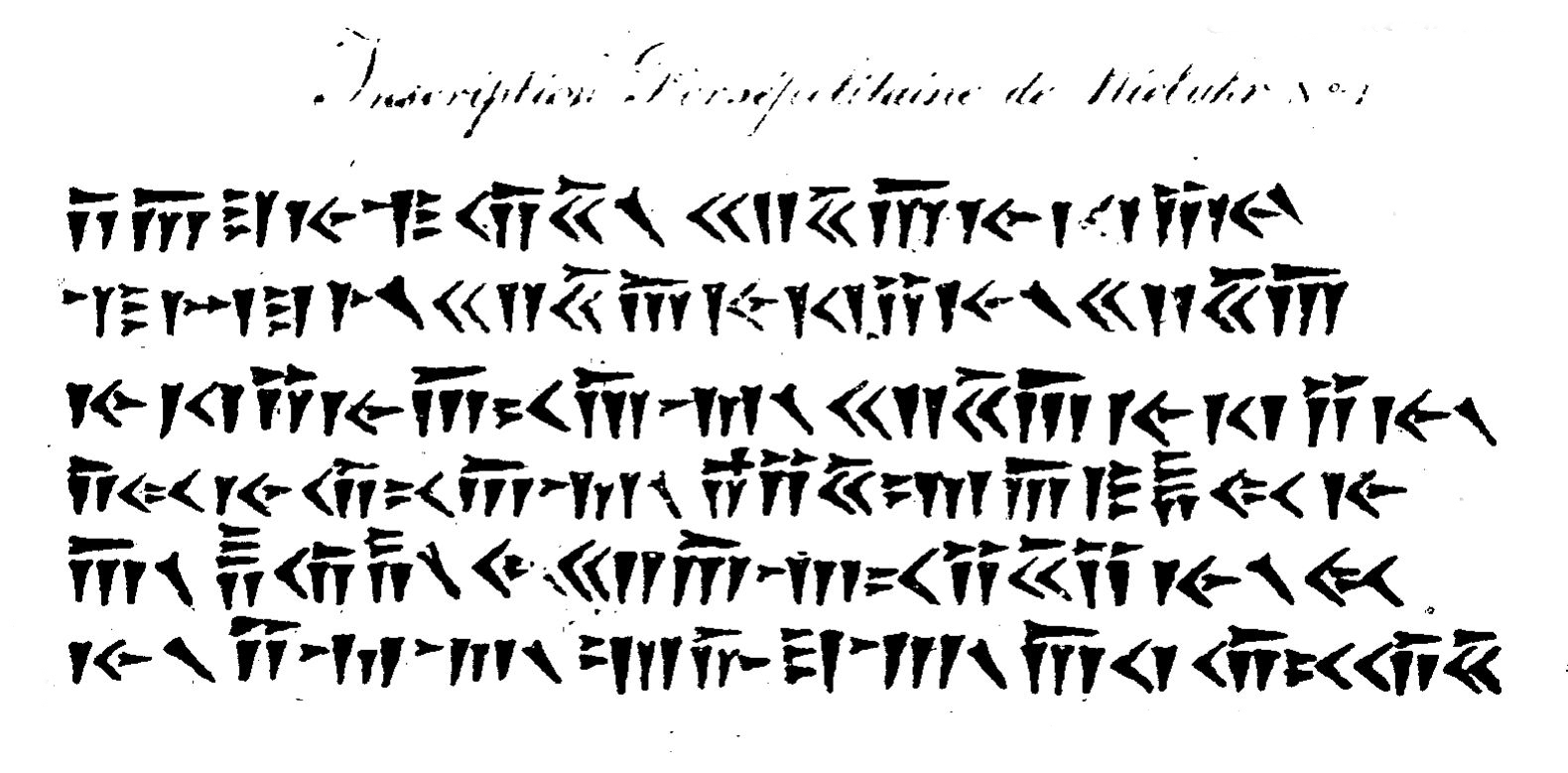
Niebuhr inscription 1. Now known to mean "Darius the Great King, King of Kings, King of countries, son of Hystaspes, an Achaemenian, who built this Palace". Today known as DPa, from the Palace of Darius in Persepolis, above figures of the king and attendants

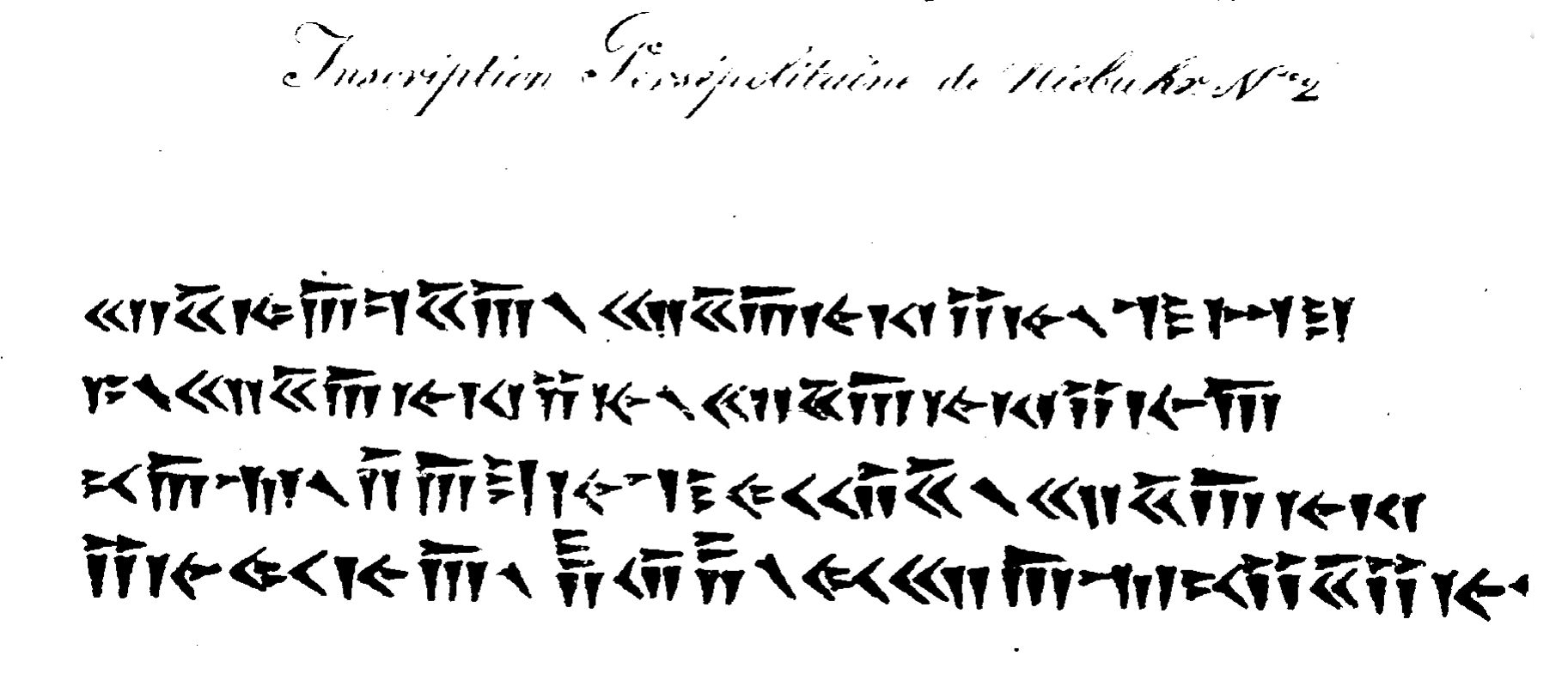
Niebuhr inscription 2. Now known to mean "Xerxes the Great King, King of Kings, son of Darius the King, an Achaemenian". Today known as XPe, the text of fourteen inscriptions in three languages (Old Persian, Elamite, Babylonian) from the Palace of Xerxes in Persepolis.

He also visited the ruins of Babylon (making many important sketches), Baghdad, Mosul, and Aleppo. He seems also to have visited the Behistun Inscription in around 1764. After a visit to Cyprus, he made a tour through Palestine, crossed the Taurus Mountains to Bursa, reached Constantinople in February 1767 and finally arrived in Copenhagen in the following November.

Map of Yemen, prepared by Niebuhr

Niebuhr's production during the expedition is indeed impressive. It includes small-scale maps and charts of Yemen, the Red Sea, the Persian Gulf and Oman, and other larger scale maps covering the Nile Delta, the Gulf of Suez and the regions surrounding various port cities he visited, including Mokha and Surat. He completed 28 town plans of significant historical value because of their uniqueness for that period.

In summary, Niebuhr's maps, charts and plans constitute the greatest single addition to the cartography of the region that was produced through field research and published in the 18th century.

== Scientific collaboration with Abd-al-Rahman Aga ==
In the summer of 1772, an embassy from the Regency of Tripoli arrived in Copenhagen. Carsten Niebhur was asked to assist the official interpreter, Andreas Æreboe, who did not have a sufficient command of Arabic. The embassy was led by the Tripolitan diplomat and statesman Abd-al-Rahman Aga, who had been a frequent visitor to European courts since 1763. The two men met for the first time at the Tripolitan ambassador’s residence on July 5, and then on numerous occasions thereafter, until November 1772. During these meetings, a very fruitful intellectual collaboration developed, involving the exchange of manuscripts and translations.

Niebhur then wrote a series of articles drawing on the knowledge of Abd-al-Rahman Aga, as well as that of two of his enslaved servants who had accompanied him to Copenhagen—one from Timbuktu and the other from Hausaland. This series of articles consists of “observations by a figure from Tripoli on the interior of Africa, cross-referenced with the accounts of two African servants or slaves, then analyzed and narrated by a German explorer specializing in Arabia”. The text also contains the first list of Hausa language vocabulary ever transcribed into Latin script. It is therefore an exceptional source for the history of the co-production of knowledge between African and European intellectuals.

== Family and later career ==
In 1773, Niebuhr married Christiane Sophia Blumenberg, the daughter of the crown physician, and for some years he held a post in the Danish military service, which enabled him to remain in Copenhagen. In 1776 he was elected a foreign member of the Royal Swedish Academy of Sciences. In 1778 he accepted a position in the civil service of Danish Holstein, and went to reside at Meldorf (Ditmarschen). In 1806 he was promoted to Etatsrat, and in 1809 was made a Knight of the Order of the Dannebrog, one of Denmark–Norway's most valued honours for service.

== Writing and research ==
Niebuhr's first book, Beschreibung von Arabien, was published in Copenhagen in 1772, the Danish government providing subsidies for the engraving and printing of its numerous illustrations. This was followed in 1774 and 1778 by the first two volumes of Niebuhr's Reisebeschreibung nach Arabien und andern umliegender Ländern. These works (particularly the one published in 1778), and most specifically the accurate copies of the cuneiform inscriptions found at Persepolis, were to prove to be extremely important to the decipherment of cuneiform writing. Before Niebuhr's publication, cuneiform inscriptions were often thought to be merely decorations and embellishments, and no accurate decipherments or translations had been made up to that point. Niebuhr demonstrated that the three trilingual inscriptions found at Persepolis were in fact three distinct forms of cuneiform writing (which he termed Class I, Class II, and Class III) to be read from left to right. His accurate copies of the trilingual inscriptions gave Orientalists the key to finally crack the cuneiform code, leading to the discovery of Old Persian, Akkadian, and Sumerian.

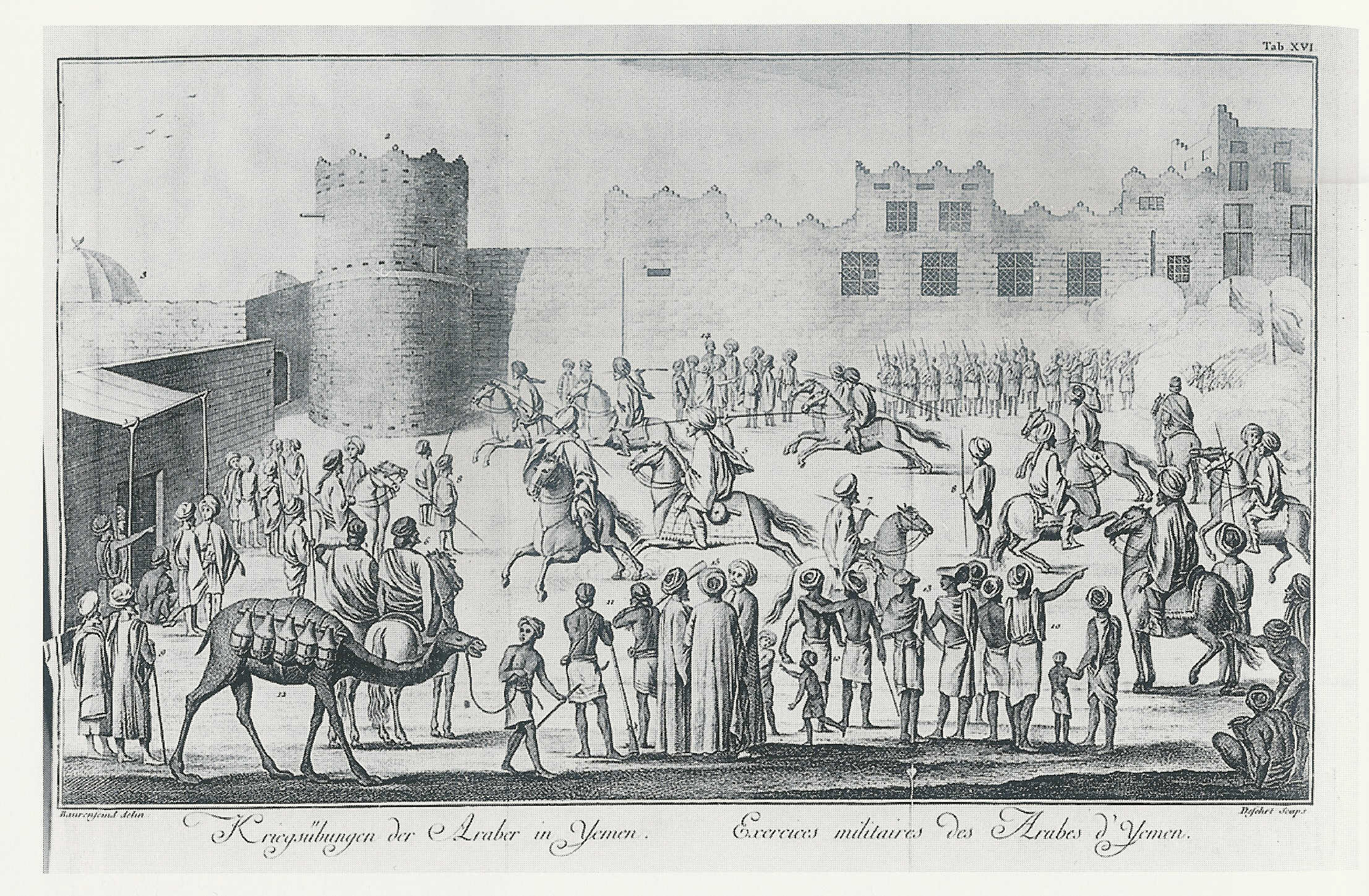
"War Exercises of the Arabs in Yemen", original print from Niebuhr's Reisebeschreibung nach Arabien und andern umliegender Ländern, 1774-1778

The third volume of the Reisebeschreibung, also based on materials from the expedition, was not published till 1837, long after Niebuhr's death, under the editorship of his daughter and his assistant, Johan Nicolaus Gloyer. Niebuhr also contributed papers on the interior of Africa, the political and military condition of the Ottoman Empire, and other subjects to a German periodical, the Deutsches Museum. In addition, he edited and published the work of his friend Peter Forsskål, the naturalist on the Arabian expedition, under the titles Descriptiones animalium, Flora Aegyptiaco-Arabica and Icones rerum naturalium (Copenhagen, 1775 and 1776).

Between 1790 and 1791, Niebuhr finally published the results of his collaboration with Abd-al-Rahman Aga and his two slaves in the Deutsches Museum's journal, Neues Deutsches Museum, in the form of four articles: “Das Innere von Afrika” (1790), “Noch Etwas Über die Mohammedanischen Freistaaten in der Barbarei” (1791), “Noch Etwas Über die Mohammedanischen Freistaaten in der Barbarei” (1791), and “Noch Etwas Über das Innere von Afrika” (1791).

French and Dutch translations of Niebuhr's narratives were published during his lifetime, and a condensed English translation of his own three volumes, prepared by Robert Heron, was published in Edinburgh in 1792, under the title "Travels through Arabia". A facsimile edition of this translation, as by "M. Niebuhr", was published in two volumes by the Libraire du Liban, Beirut (undated).

The government funds covered only a fraction of the printing costs for Niebuhr's first book, and probably a similar or smaller proportion of the costs for the other two volumes. To ensure that the volumes were published, Niebuhr had to pay over 80% of the costs himself. In all, Niebuhr devoted ten years of his life, the years 1768–1778, to the publication of six volumes of findings from the expedition. He had virtually no help from the academics who had conceived and shaped the expedition in Göttingen and Copenhagen. It was only Niebuhr's determination to publish the findings of the expedition that ensured that the Danish Arabia expedition would produce results that would benefit the world of scholarship.

== Death and legacy ==
Niebuhr died in Meldorf in 1815.

Johann Wolfgang von Goethe (1749-1832) highly prized Niebuhr's works. In 1811 he wrote to Niebuhr's son, Barthold Georg Niebuhr, that "You carry a name which I have learned to honour since my youth."

Carsten Niebuhrs Gade, a street in the port area of Copenhagen, is named after him.

In 2011, Copenhagen's National Library and National Museum held exhibitions of Carsten Niebuhr's life and work, celebrating the 250th anniversary of the Danish Arabia Expedition's commencement. Commemorative Carsten Niebuhr postal stamps were issued. And in the same year the Danish Ministry of Foreign Affairs had planned a series of cultural events based on the Expedition and Niebuhr's work that would take place in Ankara, Cairo, Damascus, Beirut, Tehran, and Yemen. It has been suggested that these efforts were intended in part to repair the reputational damage in the Islamic world caused by the Danish cartoon controversy. Ultimately, the planned events were prevented by the Arab Spring.

== Works ==
- Niebuhr, Carsten. Beschreibung von Arabien. Aus eigenen Beobachtungen und im Lande selbst gesammleten Nachrichten. Copenhagen, 1772.
- Niebuhr, Carsten. Reisebeschreibung nach Arabien und andern umliegender Ländern. 2 vols. Copenhagen, 1774–1778.
- Niebuhr, Carsten. "Über Längen-Beobachtungen im Orient u.s.w. Aus einem Schreiben des königl. Dänischen geheimer Justiz-Raths Carsten Niebuhr". Monatliche Correspondenz zur Beförderung der Erd- und Himmels-Kunde 4 (1801), pp. 240–253.
- Niebuhr, Carsten. Biographische Nachrichten aus Tobias Mayer's Jugendjahren aus einem Schreiben des Königlich Dänischen Justiz-Raths C. Niebuhr, Monatliche Correspondenz zur Beförderung der Erd-und Himmels-Kunde 8 (1803), pp. 45–56, and 9 (1804), pp. 487–491.
- Niebuhr, Carsten. Reisebescheibung nach Arabien und andern umliegenden Ländern. Vol. 3. Carsten Niebuhr Reisen durch Syrien und Palästina, nach Cypern, und durch Kleinasien und die Türkei nach Deutschland und Dännemark, edited by J. N.Gloyer and J. Olshausen. Hamburg, 1837.
- Niebuhr, Carsten. Rejsebeskrivele fra Arabien og andre omkringliggende Lande, translated by Hans Christian Fink, with an introduction by Michhael Harbsmeier. 2 vols., Copenhagen, 2003.
- Niebuhr, Carsten. Beskrivelse af Arabien ud fra egne iagttagelser og i landet selv samlede efterretinger, translated by Hans Christian Fink, with an introduction by Niels Peter Lemche. Copenhagen, 2009.

=== In collaboration with Abd-al-Rahman Aga ===
- Niebuhr, Carsten. "Das Innere von Afrika". Neues Deutsche Museum 2 (1790), pp. 963-1003.
- Niebuhr, Carsten. "Noch Etwas Über die Mohammedanischen Freistaaten in der Barbarei". Neues Deutsche Museum 1 (1791), pp. 1-26.
- Niebuhr, Carsten. "Noch Etwas Über die Mohammedanischen Freistaaten in der Barbarei". Neues Deutsche Museum 2 (1791), pp. 115-133.
- Niebuhr, Carsten. "Noch Etwas Über das Innere von Afrika". Neues Deutsche Museum 3 (1791), pp. 419-435.

== Bibliography ==
- Baack, Lawrence J. 'A practical skill that was without equal: Carsten Niebuhr and the navigational astronomy of the Arabian Journey, 1761-1767'. The Mariner's Mirror, 99.2 (2013), pp. 138–152.
- Baack, Lawrence J. Undying Curiosity. Carsten Niebuhr and the Royal Danish Expedition to Arabia (1761-1767). Stuttgart, 2014.
- Chisholm, Hugh, ed. (1911). "Niebuhr, Karsten" . Encyclopædia Britannica. Vol. 19 (11th ed.). Cambridge University Press. p. 669.
- Eck, Reimer. 'Tobias Mayer, Johann David Michaelis, Carsten Niebuhr und die Göttingen Methode der Längenbestimmung'. Mitteilungen Gauss-Gesellschaft e. V. Göttingen, 22 (1986), pp. 73–81.
- Friis, Ib, Harbsmeier, Michael and Simonsen, Jørgen Bæk. Early scientific expeditions and local encounters. New perspectives on Carsten Niebuhr and 'The Arabian Journey'. Proceedings of a symposium on the occasion of the 250th anniversary of the Royal Danish Expedition to Arabia Felix. [Copenhagen], 2013.
- Hansen, Anne Haslund. Niebuhr's Museum. Artefacts and souvenirs from the Royal Danish Expedition to Arabia 1761-1767. Copenhagen, 2016.
- Hansen, Thorkild. Arabia Felix, translated by James and Kathleen McFarlane. New York, 1963.
- Hopkins, I.W.J. 'The maps of Carsten Niebuhr: 200 years after.' The Cartographic Journal 4 (1967), pp. 115–118.
- Moscrop, Andrew. The Camel's Neighbour : Travel and Travellers in Yemen. Oxford, 2020.
- Niebuhr, Barthold Georg. Carsten Niebuhrs Leben, Kleine historische und philologische Schriften. Bonn, 1828.
- Niebuhr, Barthold Georg. Vorträge über alte Geschichte an der Universität zu Bonn gehalten, edited M. Niebuhr. Vol. 1. Berlin, 1847.
- Rasmussen, Stig T. (ed.). Den Arabiske Rejse 1761-1767. En dansk ekspedition set i verdenskabshistorisk perspektiv. Copenhagen, 1990.
- Rasmussen, Stig T. (ed.). Carsten Niebuhr und die Arabische Reise 1761-1767. Ausstellung der Königlichen Bibliothek Kopenhagen in Zusammenbang mit dem Kultusministerium des Landes Schleswig-Holstein. Heide, 1986.
- Vermeulen, Han F., 'Anthropology and the Orient: C. Niebuhr and the Danish-German Arabia Expedition'. In: Han F. Vermeulen: Before Boas: the Genesis of Ethnography and Ethnology in the German Enlightenment. Lincoln & London, University of Nebraska Press, 2016. ISBN 978-0-8032-5542-5
- Wiesehöfer, Josef and Conermann, Stephan (eds). Carsten Niebuhr (1733-1815) und seine Zeit. Stuttgart, 2002.
