= 1697 in Denmark =

- Decades: 1670s; 1680s; 1690s; 1700s; 1710s
- See also: Other events of 1697; List of years in Denmark

Events from the year 1697 in Denmark

== Incumbents ==
- Monarch – Christian V

== Events ==
16 October – The Norwegian Code, promulgated by King Christian V in 1687, is amended to provide for torture of condemned criminals in certain capital offenses in Norway, with permission for burning with hot irons, or cutting off the prisoner's right hand while the prisoner is being transported for decapitation.

== Births ==
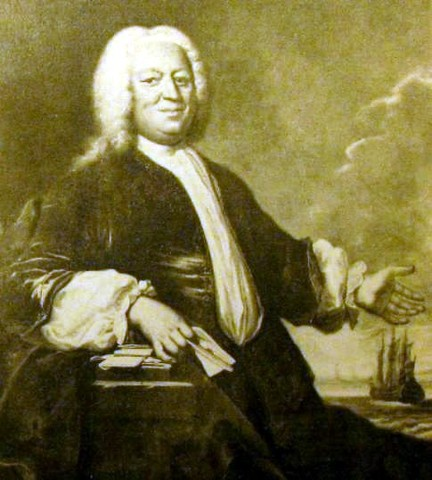
Michael Fabritius-

- 7 January – Wilhelm August von der Osten, civil servant (died 1764)
- 2 May – Michael Fabritius, businessman (died 1746)

== Deaths ==
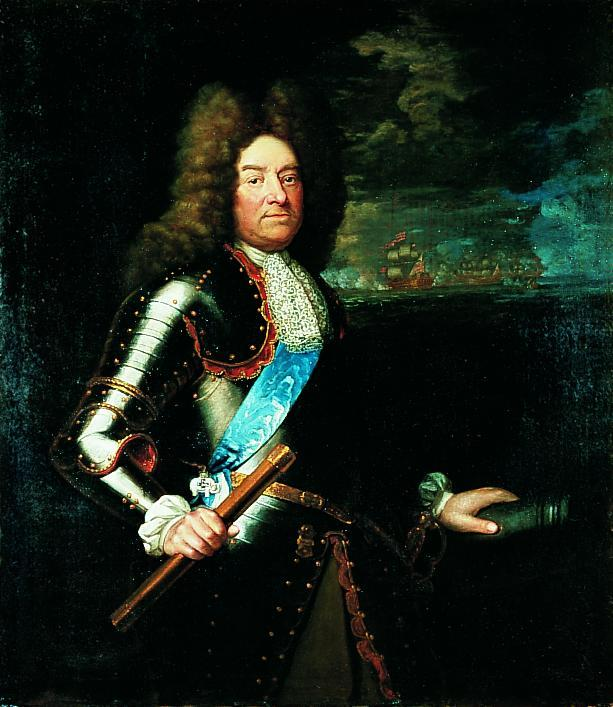
Niels Juel, painted by Jacob Coning.

- 26 January – Georg Mohr, mathematician (born 1640)
- 5 February –Esaias Fleischer,priest (born 1633)
- 8 April – Niels Juel, admiral (born 1629 in Norway).
