= 1694 in Denmark =

- Decades: 1670s; 1680s; 1690s; 1700s; 1710s
- See also: Other events of 1694; List of years in Denmark

Events from the year 1694 in Denmark

== Incumbents ==
- Monarch – Christian V

== Events ==
17 November – The frigate HDMS Ørnen is launched at Nyholm in Copenhagen.

=== Undated events ===
- Juellund Manor is established by Jens Juel.
- The Jewish Cemetery in Nørrebro is inaugurated.

== Births ==
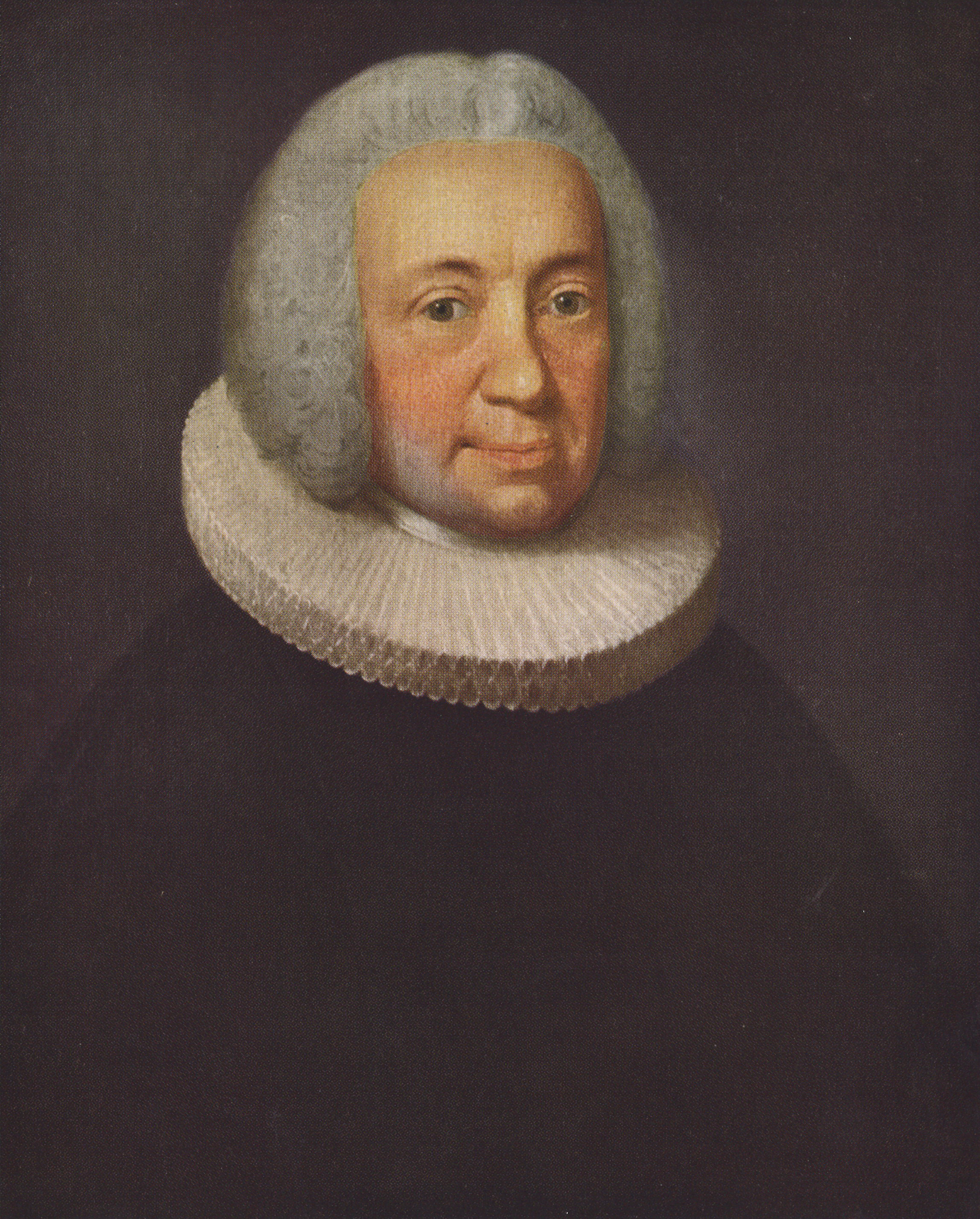
Hans Adolph Brorson-

- 12 January – Oluf Blach, merchant and shipowner (born 1767)
- 20 June – Hans Adolph Brorson, bishop (died 1764)
- 7 September – Johan Ludvig Holstein, statesman (died 1763)

=== Full date missing ===
- Jens Juel-Vind, landowner (died 1726)
- Frederick Moth, Governor-General of St. Thomas & St. John (died 1745)
- Jens Juel-Vind, chamberlain and landowner (died 1726)

== Deaths ==
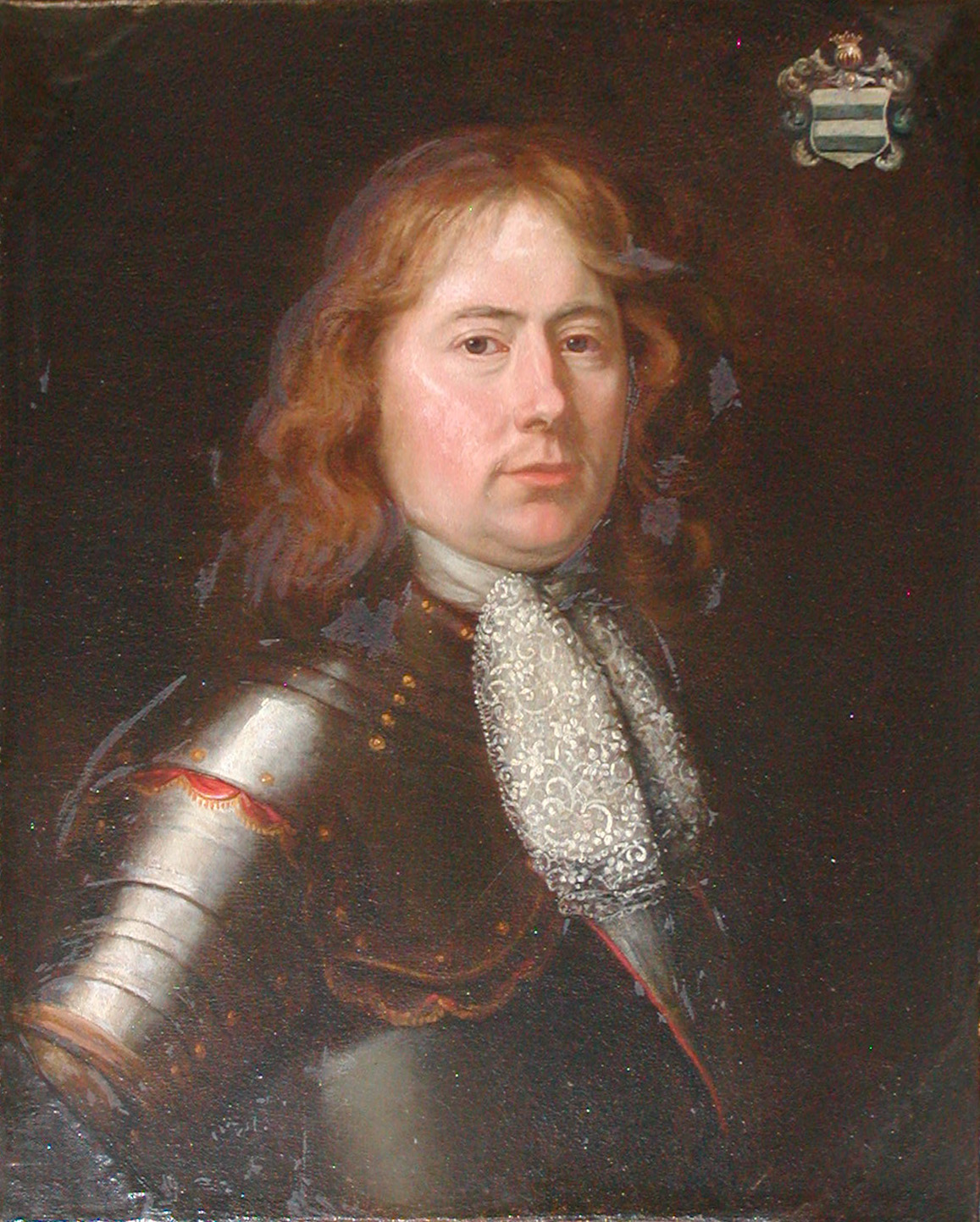
Mogens Skeel.

- 13 January – Christian Bielke, admiral /born 1645 in Norway)
- 5 August – Mogens Skeel, nobleman and writer (born 1651)
- 27 December – Henrik Span, naval officer and shipbioæder (born 1634)

=== Full date missing ===
- Christian Porck, Governor of Tranquebar
