= 1696 in Denmark =

- Decades: 1670s; 1680s; 1690s; 1700s; 1710s
- See also: Other events of 1696; List of years in Denmark

Events from the year 1696 in Denmark

== Incumbents ==
- Monarch – Christian V

== Events ==
- 19 April – Church of Our Saviour on Christianshavn in Copenhagen is inaugurated.

Full date missing

- The Thisted witch trial, referred to as the last witch trials in Denmark, begins in Thisted.

== Births ==
- 22 June – Joost van Hemert, merchant and ship-owner (died 1775)

== Deaths ==
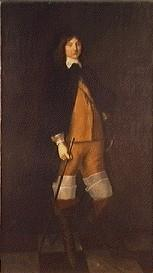
Jørgen Bjelke.

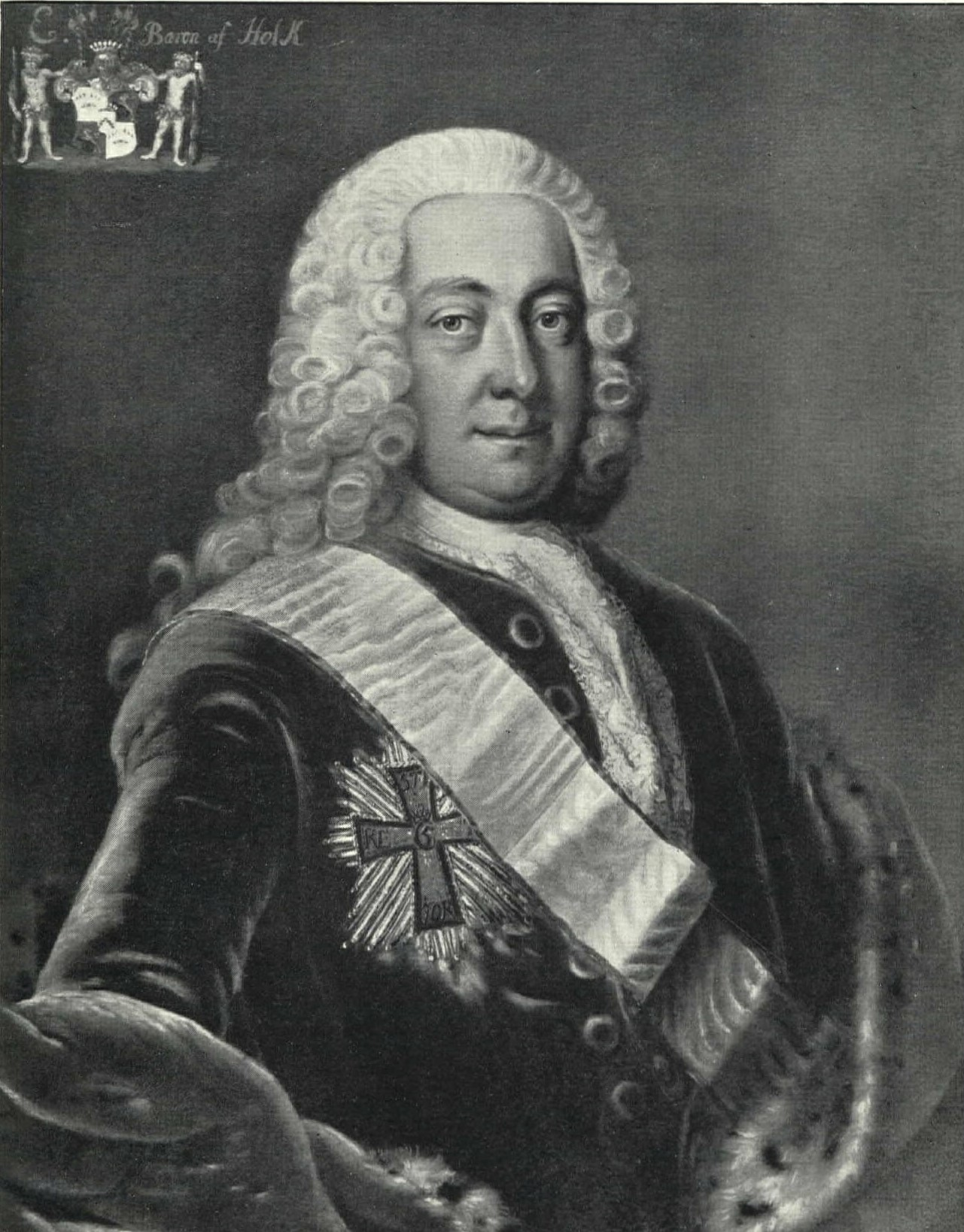
Eiler Holck.

- 17 June – Jørgen Bjelke, military officer (born 1721 in Norway)
- 28 June – Eiler Holck, baron and military officer (born 1627)

Undated

- Peder Lauridsen Kylling, botanist (born 1640)
