= 1726 in Denmark =

- Decades: 1700s; 1710s; 1720s; 1730s; 1740s
- See also: Other events of 1726; List of years in Denmark

Events from the year 1726 in Denmark.

== Incumbents ==
- Monarch – Frederick IV
- Grand Chancellor – Ulrik Adolf Holstein

== Events ==
- 25 June – A fire breaks out in Viborg destroying more than 150 buildings.

== Births ==
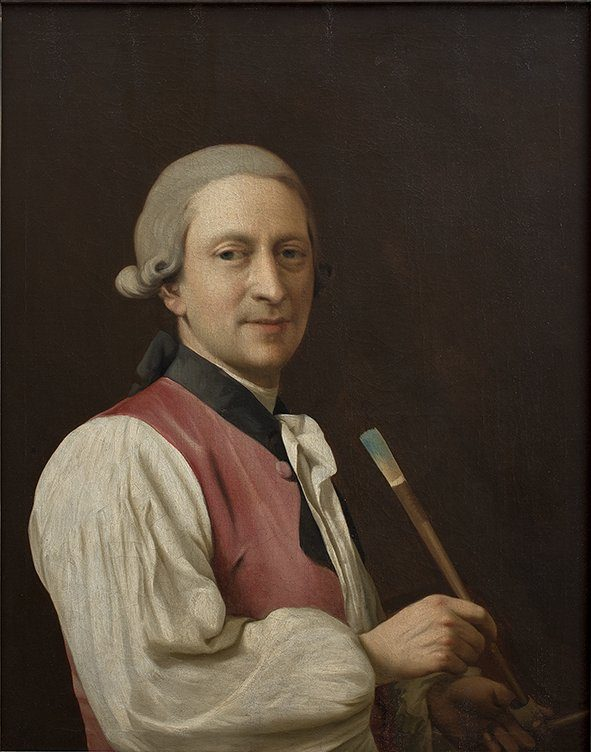
Peter Cramer.

- 24 March – Johanna Marie Fosie, first professional female Danish painter (died 1764)
- 24 August – Peter Cramer, painter (died 1782)
- 19 October – Princess Louise of Denmark, duchess of Saxe-Hildburghausen (died 1756 in Germany)
- 21 October – Adolph Sigfried von der Osten, diplomat (died 1797)
- 5 December – Honoratus Bonnevie, physician (died 1811)
- 24 December – Johann Hartmann, violinist and composer (died 1793)

== Deaths ==
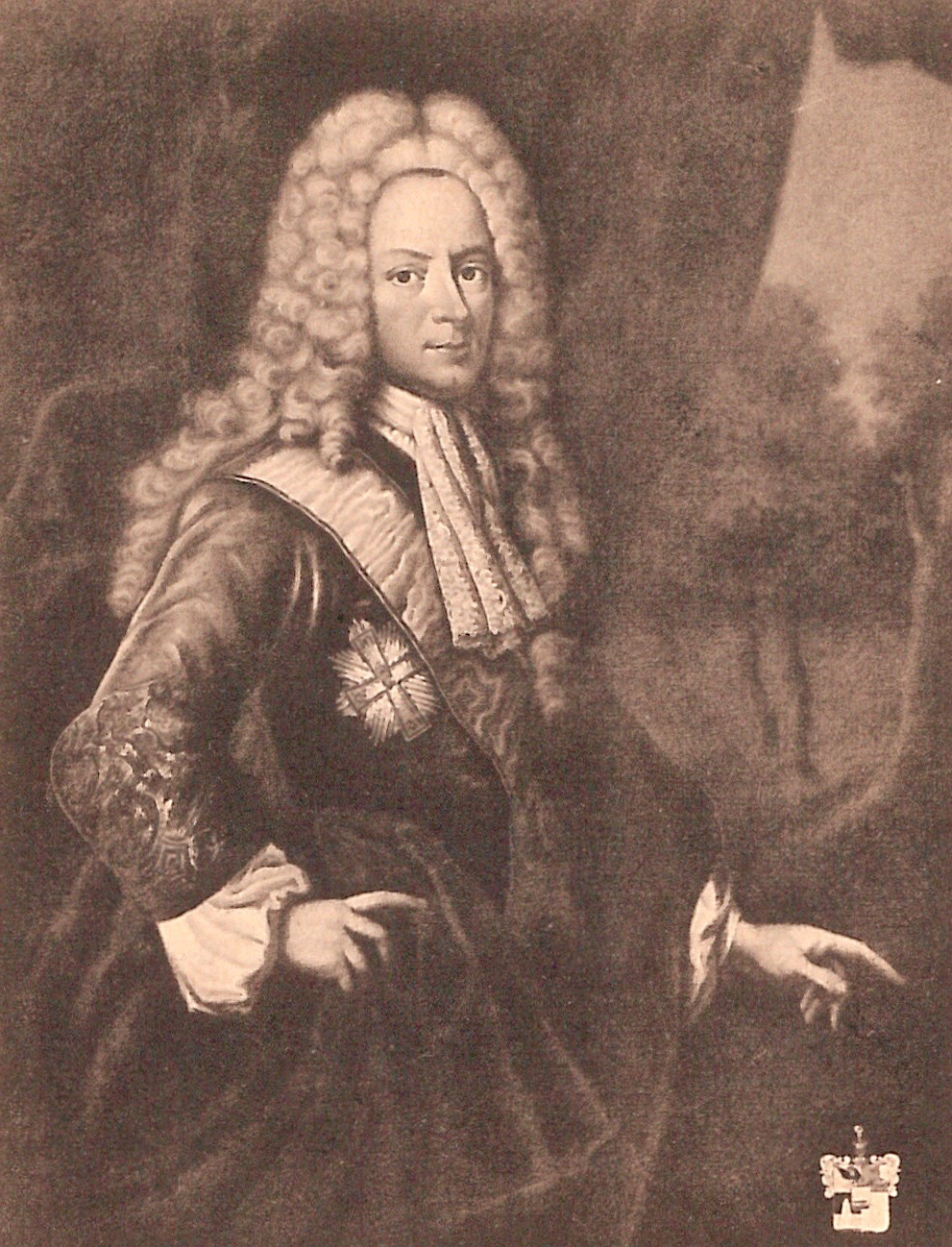
Frederik Christian Adeler,

- 10 February – Johan Christopher Schönbach, county governor and landowner (born 1663)
- 19 April – Frederik Christian Adeler, privy councillor, county governor and landowner (born 1668)
- 20 December – Jens Juel-Vind, landowner (born 1694)
