= 1695 in Denmark =

- Decades: 1670s; 1680s; 1690s; 1700s; 1710s
- See also: Other events of 1695; List of years in Denmark

Events from the year 1695 in Denmark

== Incumbents ==
- Monarch – Christian V

== Events ==
- 5 December – The wedding of Crown Prince Frederick (IV) and Louise of Mecklenburg-Güstrow takes place at Copenhagen Castle.

=== Undated events ===
- Motzmanns Plads, now known as Christiansholm or Papirøen, is created in Copenhagen.

== Births ==
- 11 February – Abraham Pelt, industrialist and philanthropist (died 1783)

== Deaths ==
- 9 May – Lambert van Haven, architect (born 1630)
- 27 June – Prince Christian of Denmark, prince of Denmark (born 1675)
