= Lawrence J. Baack =

American historian (born 1943)

Lawrence J. Baack (born May 13, 1943) is an American historian of modern Europe, with a particular interest in Germany and Scandinavia, and a sub-specialty in Antarctica. He is the author of Agrarian Reform in Eighteenth Century Denmark, Christian Bernstorff and Prussia: Diplomacy and Reform Conservatism 1818–1832, and Undying Curiosity: Carsten Niebuhr and the Royal Danish Expedition to Arabia 1761–1767, among other works.

== Life and career ==
Baack was born in Berkeley, California, which remains his home today. He graduated in 1964 from the University of California, Berkeley, with a major in history. At Berkeley, his advisor was Raymond J. Sontag, the well-known scholar in European diplomatic history, and he was on the varsity track team, and a member of The Big C Society, running under the legendary Olympic coach Brutus Hamilton. He was later asked to edit a collection of Hamilton's writings and letters.

Baack was an officer in the United States Navy from 1964 to 1969, and had three deployments to Vietnam during the Vietnam War.

He subsequently entered graduate school in history at Stanford University. There he was a student of Peter Paret, the distinguished Europeanist, who greatly influenced his approach to the study of history. He received his PhD in 1973. His academic career began at the University of Nebraska–Lincoln, where he was promoted and tenured, and became Vice Chair of the History Department. He also served as Head of the Area Studies Program in International Affairs and Business, Chairman of the University Libraries Committee and a member of the University Research Council. While at Nebraska, he was also a guest professor at the U.S. Naval War College in Newport, Rhode Island, and was selected by the National Science Foundation as the U.S. Antarctic Fellow for 1979–80. During that year he participated in American research activities in Antarctica including the exploration of the Ellsworth Mountains. At Nebraska his major published research studies examined social and agricultural change in 18th-century Denmark, and Prussia's German and European policies and notions of German nationhood during the first third of the 19th century. The latter work has been called "a remarkable scholarly achievement" (Felix Gilbert), and the reviewer in the English Historical Review concluded "Baack's outstanding study of Pre-March Prussia cannot be ignored by anyone interested in modern German history." (William Carr).

After his work in Antarctica, he returned to the San Francisco Bay Area and, beginning a business career, accepted a position as the director of education at the Pacific Gas and Electric Company (PG&E), at that time the nation's largest gas and electric utility. He subsequently held a number of executive positions at PG&E, including head of the community and governmental relations departments and vice president for corporate planning. While at PG&E, he continued to be involved academically, normally teaching a seminar each semester at either San Francisco State University or the University of California, Berkeley.

During that period he was also active as a civic leader in the San Francisco area. He served as President of the Bay Area Economic Forum, a leadership partnership of governmental, business, university, environmental, community and labor leaders in the region. He was also Chairman of the Bay Area Defense Conversion Task Force charged with the challenge of dealing with the closure of twelve military bases in the region in the wake of the end of the Cold War with the attendant loss of over 250,000 jobs. He was the co-chair of the Bay Area Water Transit Task Force, and was asked to be the chair of the board of directors of the Mathematics, Engineering, Science Achievement Program by the president of the University of California System, a program serving historically under-represented minorities in the California schools and universities. He was also appointed to the California Commission on the Management and Leadership of the Public Schools, the Director's Blue Ribbon Task Force for the California State Park System, the California Economic Policy Working Group of the California State Legislature, and the Regional Planning Committee for the Association of Bay Area Governments. He has served as a director or trustee for a number of organizations whose work focused on services for urban youth, education, economic opportunity for minority communities, and reducing poverty and homelessness, as well as for organizations such as the United Way of the Bay Area and the World Affairs Council of Northern California.

In retirement, Baack returned to academic research and was a visiting scholar in the history department at the University of California, Berkeley from 2003 to 2011. His research interests and publications have focused on European scientific exploration in the 18th century, specifically the Royal Danish Expedition to Arabia. The expedition has been called by some "one of the most extraordinary journeys of all time." This led to his book-length study, Undying Curiosity. Carsten Niebuhr and the Royal Danish Expedition to Arabia 1761-1767. It has been called by Juergen Osterhammel "A superb biography" and Jan Marten Ivo Klaver in his review in Isis wrote that "Undying Curiosity is a beautifully written book that for a long time will be the definitive account of the Royal Danish Expedition of 1761-1767 and of Carsten Niebuhr's central role in it."

He has been married, since 1964, to Dr. Jane E. Baack, a retired professor of organizational behavior at San Francisco State University. He has two children, James, an information technology engineer at PG&E, and Sally, professor of strategic management, and chair of the management department at San Francisco State University, and four grandchildren.

== Honors and awards ==
- Phi Beta Kappa Honor Society, University of California, Berkeley, 1964.
- Graduated with Distinction, University of California, Berkeley, 1964.
- The Order of the Golden Bear, University of California, Berkeley, 1964.
- The Big C Society, University of California, Berkeley, 1964.
- Secretary of the Navy Achievement Medal and Presidential Unit Citation, United States Navy, (for service in the Mekong Delta, 1966–1967).
- Historische Kommission zu Berlin, International Fellowship, 1971.
- National Science Foundation, selected as the United States Antarctic Fellow, 1979–1980.
- United Way of the Bay Area Award for Outstanding Public Service, 1989.
- Northern California Corporate Social Responsibility Award, 1990, Mexican–American Legal Defense and Education Fund (MALDEF).
- California State Senate Resolution honoring Work in support of Minority Communities, 1991.
- Chairman's Excellence Award, Pacific Gas and Electric Company, 1993.

== Publications (selected) ==
- "The 'extraordinary' Expedition to Arabia: What does it mean to us today?" in Arrivals: The Life of the Royal Danish Expedition to Arabia 1767–2017. Edited by Anne Haslund Hansen. The National Museum of Denmark. Forlaget Vandkunsten, 2017.
- Undying Curiosity. Carsten Niebuhr and the Royal Danish Expedition to Arabia 1761-1767. Franz Steiner Verlag, 2014.
- "From Biblical Philology to Scientific Achievement and Cultural Understanding: Carsten Niebuhr, Peter Forsskål and Frederik von Haven and the Transformation of the Danish Expedition to Arabia 1761–1767." In Early Scientific Expeditions and Local Encounters – New Perspectives on Carsten Niebuhr and 'The Arabian Journey'. Proceedings of a symposium on the occasion of the 250th anniversary of the Royal Danish Expedition to Arabia Felix. Edited by Ib Friis, Michael Harbsmeier and Jørgen Bæk Simonsen. Royal Danish Academy of Sciences and Letters, 2013.
- "A naturalist of the Northern Enlightenment: Peter Forsskål after 250 years." Archives of natural history 30:1 (2013): 1–19.
- "'A Practical Skill that Was Without Equal': Carsten Niebuhr and the navigational astronomy of the Arabian journey, 1761-7." The Mariner's Mirror 99:2 (2013): 138–152.
- Co-author, Understanding The Bay Area's Quality of Life, Greenbelt Alliance, 1990.
- Christian Bernstorff and Prussia: Diplomacy and Reform Conservatism 1818–1832. Rutgers University Press, 1980.
- "Study of the U.S. Antarctic Research Program since World War II," Research Note, Antarctic Journal of the United States, XV, No 5(1980).
- "State Service in the Eighteenth Century: The Bernstorffs in Hanover and Denmark," The International History Review 3 (1979): 323–348.
- "Frederick William III, the Quakers and Conscientious Objectors in Prussia," The Journal of Church and State 20 (1978): 305–313.
- "Scandinavian Migration: The Case of Denmark," Reviews in European History: A Journal of Criticism 3 (1977): 423–430.
- Agrarian Reform in Eighteenth Century Denmark. University of Nebraska Studies, New Series, No. 56 (1977).
- The Worlds of Brutus Hamilton, Track and Field News Press, 1975.
