= Danish Arabia expedition =

Bypassed search for Nineveh, not recognizable

- Native name: Den Arabiske Rejse
- Date: January 4, 1761 – November 20, 1767
- Duration: 6 years, 320 days
- Location: Middle East
- Type: Expedition
- Patron: Frederick V of Denmark-Norway
- Organized by: University of Copenhagen
- Deaths: 5

The Danish Arabia expedition (Danish: Den Arabiske Rejse) was a Danish scientific expedition to Egypt, Arabia, and Syria. Its principal goal was to elucidate the Old Testament with additional research goals concerned with natural history, geography, and cartography. The expedition began in 1761. It had six members, of whom only Carsten Niebuhr survived, returning to Denmark in 1767. The journey was chronicled by Thorkild Hansen in his 1962 documentary novel Arabia Felix.

== Members ==
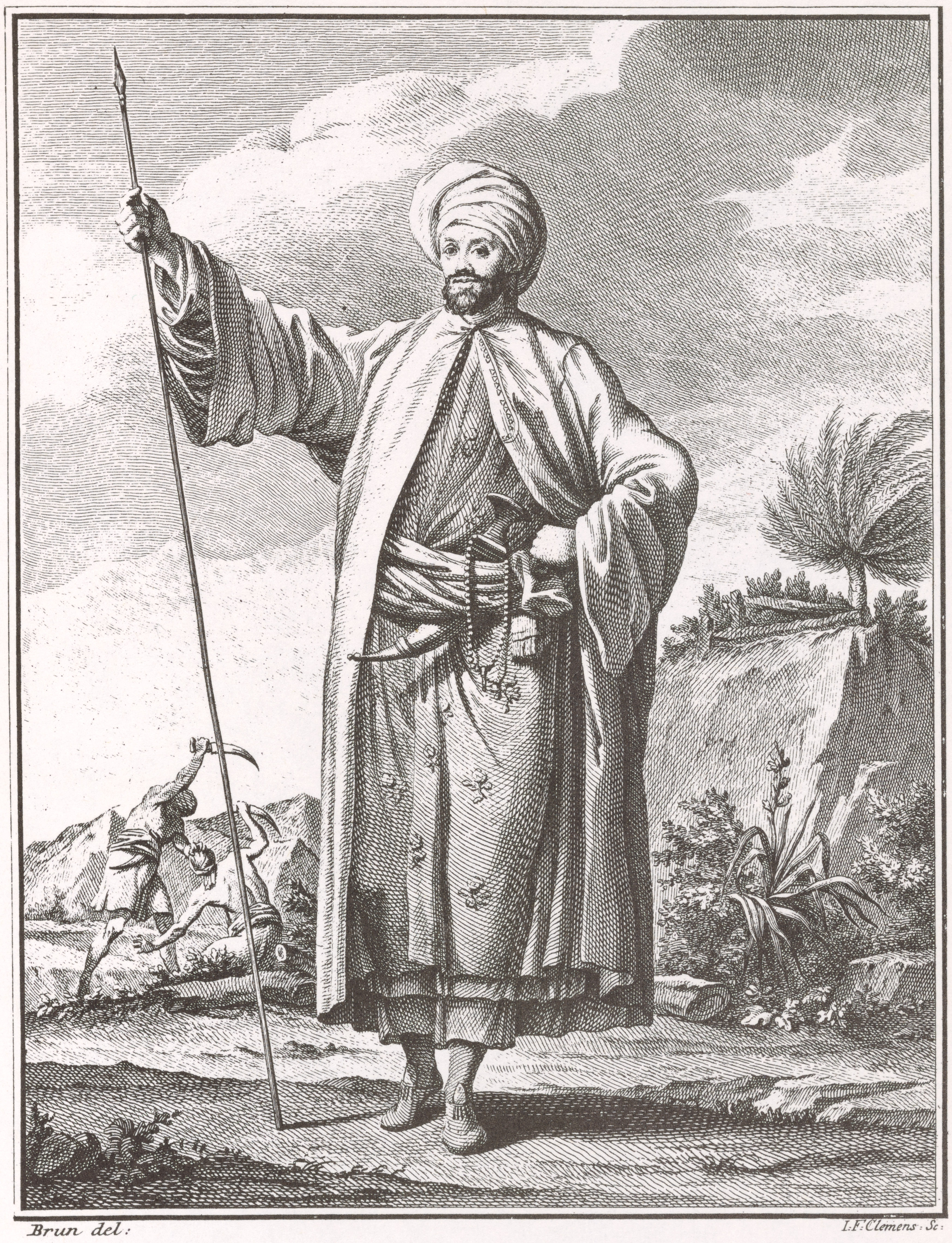
Carsten Niebuhr in the attire of a distinguished Arab in Yemen, gift from al-Mahdi Abbas, Imam of Yemen

Six people went on the expedition, and five died. † denotes which members died on the expedition.

- Peter Forsskål†: Finnish/Swedish natural scientist and student of Carl Linnaeus; his main task was to find supporting evidence for a number of Linnaeus' accounts.
- Frederik Christian von Haven†: Philologist, was tasked to purchase oriental manuscripts and to transcribe inscriptions. Furthermore, to make observations on the Arabic language, with a focus to help on the obscure passages of the Old Testament.
- Carsten Niebuhr: Cartographer, was to observe and take measurements for mapping.
- Christian Carl Kramer†: Physician, was to research medical questions, both on the scientific and also on a more practical level, among the people of Arabia.
- Georg Wilhelm Baurenfeind†: Artist and painter, tasked to sketch the finds of the others.
- Lars Berggren†: Acted as orderly on the trip.

== Expedition ==
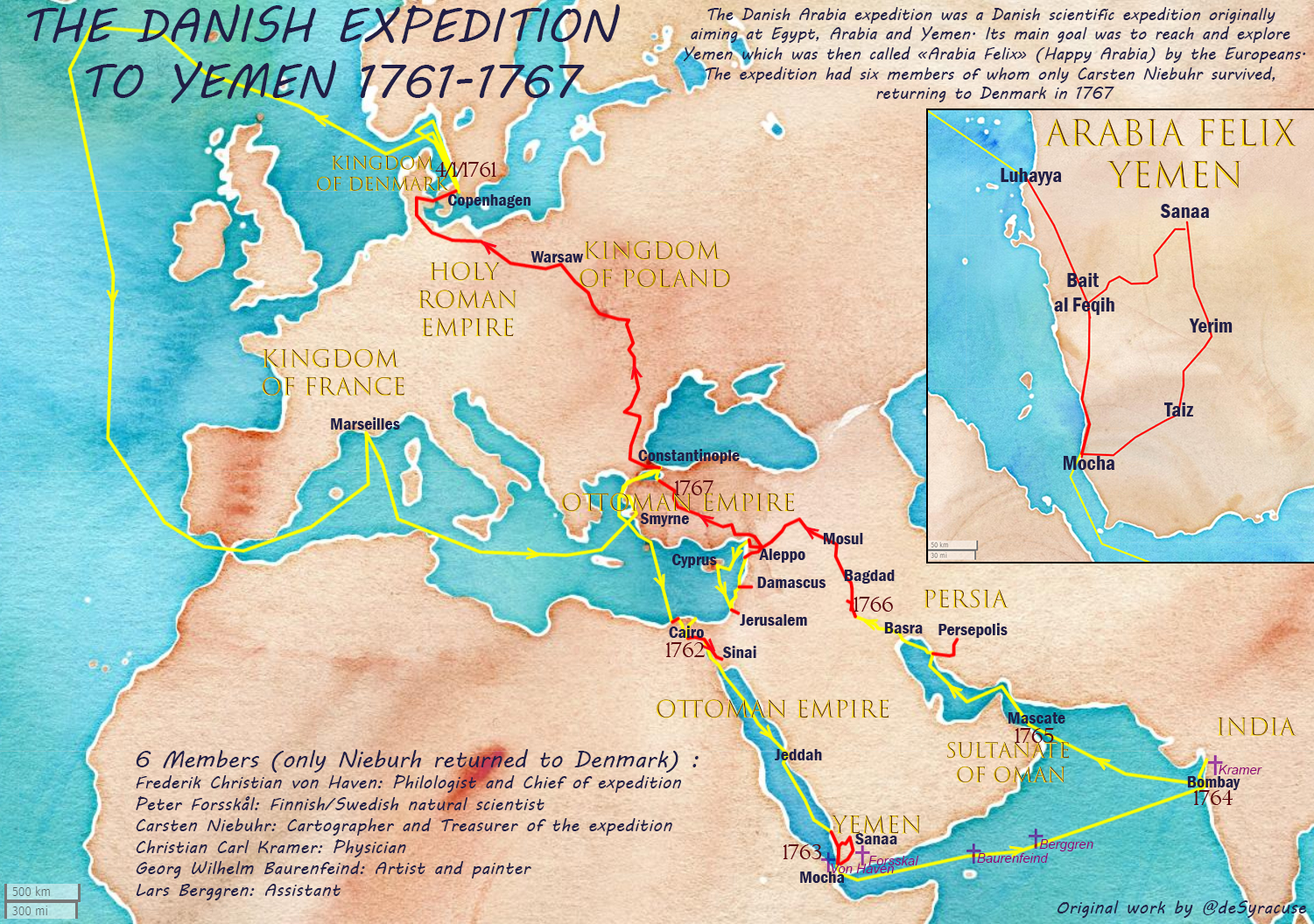
Danish expedition to Yemen (1761–1767)

The expedition departed from Copenhagen on 4 January 1761, landing at Alexandria and ascending the Nile. Proceeding to Suez, Niebuhr visited Mount Sinai, and then in October 1762 the expedition sailed to Jeddah and then journeyed overland to Mocha. Here, in May 1763, von Haven died, and shortly afterwards Forsskål died. The remaining members of the expedition visited Sanaa, the capital of Yemen, but suffered from the climate and returned to Mocha. Niebuhr seems to have preserved his own life and restored his health by adopting native dress and eating native food.

From Mocha, the expedition continued to Bombay; both Baurenfeind and Berggren died en route, and Kramer died soon after landing. Niebuhr was the only surviving member. He stayed in Bombay for fourteen months and then returned home by way of Muscat, Bushire, Shiraz, and Persepolis. His copies of the cuneiform inscriptions at Persepolis proved to be a key turning point in the decipherment of cuneiform and the birth of Assyriology. He also visited the ruins of Babylon (making many important sketches), Baghdad, Basra (where he reported on the Mandaeans), Mosul, and Aleppo. He likely visited the Behistun Inscription around 1764. After a visit to Cyprus, he made a tour through Palestine, crossed the Taurus Mountains to Bursa, reached Constantinople in February 1767, and finally arrived in Copenhagen the following November.
