= Erik Tylleman =

Erik Tylleman (died 6 October 1698) was an Opperhoved of the Danish Gold Coast, a Danish Crown Colony. He governed from the colony's capital, Fort Christiansborg. Tylleman was the first Danish Governor who reigned in the United Gold Coast in 1698. The Danish Gold Coast was established on the eastern Gold Coast (present-day Ghana).

== History ==
Originally, Karlsborg (Carolusburg) was where the Danish chief administrator was located. This had initially been in Swedish hands and reverted to Sweden by 15 April 1659. It subsequently became Dutch on 2 May 1663. Any Swedish designs on it were abandoned with the Treaty of Breda concluded on 21 July 1667. Prior to that, the Danes had made Fort Friedensborg the administrative center of their Gold Coast possessions. Fort Christiansborg became the capital of Danish West Africa after the English invaded Friedensborg as the means for collecting the Danish commander (Lieutenant Lykke)'s gambling debts.

== See also ==
- List of colonial heads of the Danish Gold Coast
