= Johan Daniel Herholdt (physician) =

Danish physician (1764–1836)

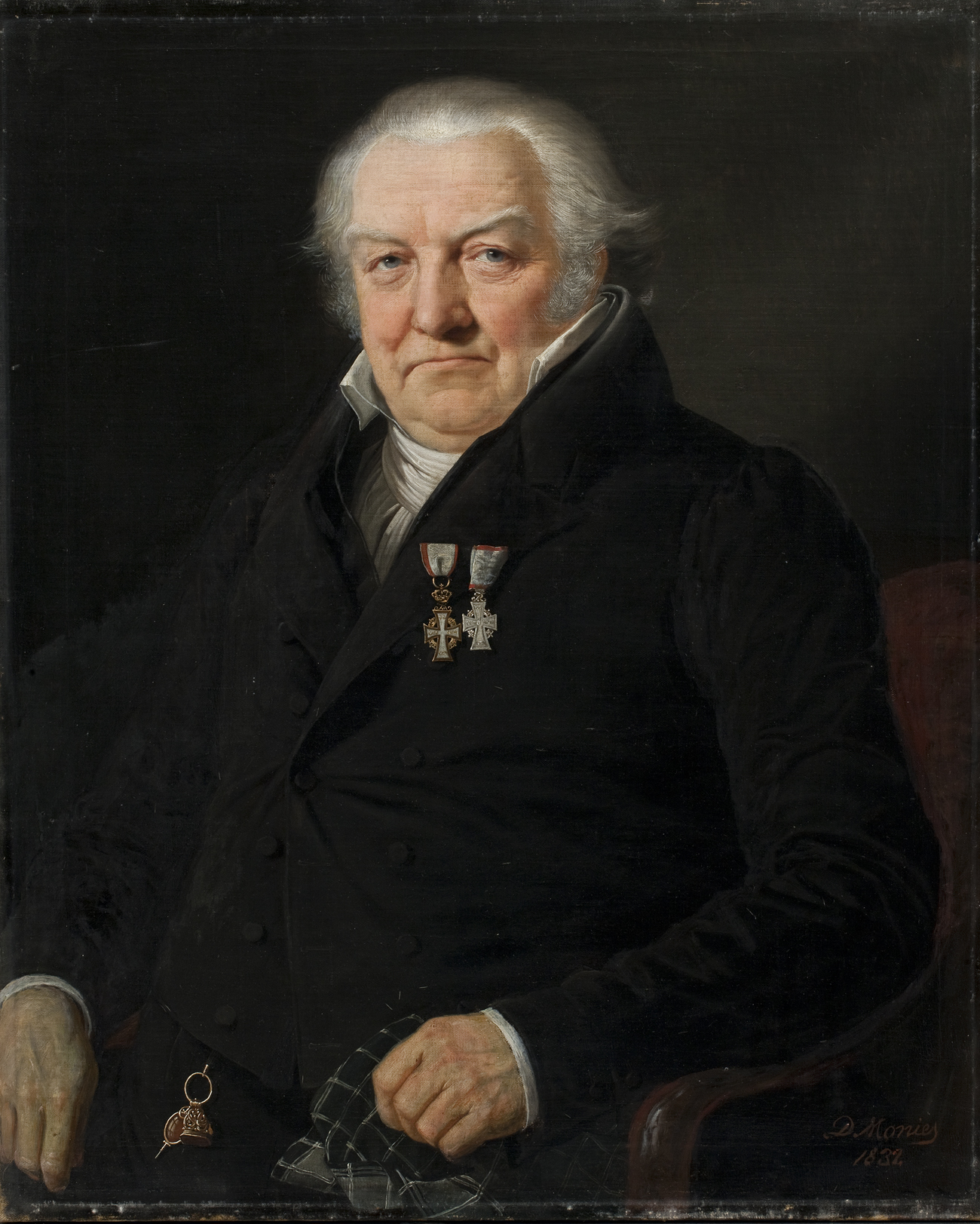
- Herholdt painted by David Monies, . National Gallery of Denmark.
- Born: 10 July 1764; Åbenrå, Denmark
- Died: 15 February 1836 (aged 66); Copenhagen, Denmark
- Occupation: Medical doctor
- Awards: Grand Cross of the Dannebrog

Johan Daniel Herholdt (10 July 1764 – 18 February 1836) was a Danish medical doctor. From 1805 to the end of his life he was a professor at the University of Copenhagen where he served as rector two times. He also served as chief physician at Royal Frederick's Hospital from 1819 to 1825. He was the paternal uncle of Johan Daniel Herholdt.

== Early life and education ==
Herholdt was born on 10 July 1764 in Åbenrå, the son of county surgeon Johan Frederik Wilhelm Herholdt (1729–82) and Cathrine Marie (Metta) Petersen. His father was after the mother's death married toSusanne Dorothea Lundt. She was after the father's death married to surgeon Nicolai Nielsen Dehnfeldt. Herholdt was initially trained as a surgeon by his father. In 1785, he moved to Copenhagen for an academic education. In 1785 he was the last surgeon to matriculate from Theatrum Anatomico-chirurgicum. He subsequently continued his studies at the newly founded Royal Danish Academy of Surgery. In 1783, he worked as a ship's surgeon. In 1787, he was employed resident surgeon in the Royal Danish Navy.

Herholdt's half brother Johan Frederik Wilhelm Herholdt was a regiment surgeon. He was the father of architect Johan Daniel Herholdt.

== Career ==
After his graduation from the Royal Danish Academy of Surgery in 1789, he was initially employed as amanuensis for Henrik Callisen. In 1790, he became resident surgeon at the academy. In 1792–1819, he worked as division surgeon in the navy.

When Magnus Horrebow died in 1796, Herholdt imsiccesfully applied for the vacant professorship anatomy at the University of Copenhagen. The chair was instead given to Sylvester Saxtorph was.

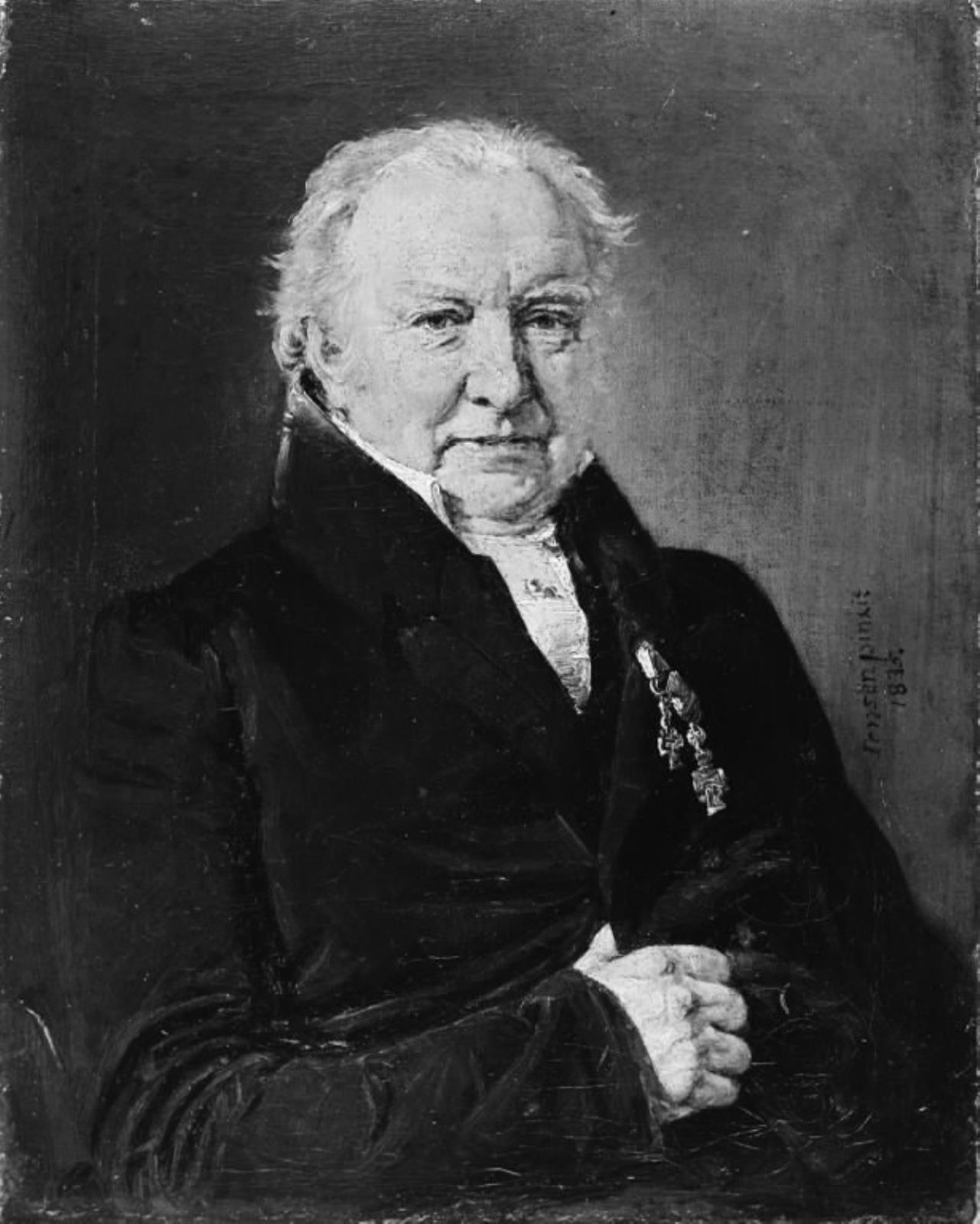
Herholdt painted by J. A. Jensen, 1835.

In 1800, Herholdt was one of the founders of the found the Society for Vaccination. As early as 1798 he became a member of the Society of the Sciences, but it was not until 1802 that he matriculated at the university and became the same year a Doctor of Medicine with the thesis on fetal death during childbirth. He became extraordinary professor at the university in 1805, staff physician in the navy in 1806, member of the health college in 1808, ordunary professor in 1818. He was chief physician at Frederiks hospital 1819–25, university rector 1819–20 and 1834–35.

Many of his publications were translated into other languages. Herholdt and Rafn won a prize from the French National Institute for a dissertation on certain animal's hibernation. He became an honorary member of the Royal Danish Medical Society in 1829. He was also a member of a number of foreign scientific societies, including those in Stockholm and Napoli. Herholdt also ran a very large private practice.

== Personal life ==
On 10 September 1789, Herholdt married to Sophie Marie Berwaldt (1763–1820). She was the daughter of colonel and later schoolmaster at Frederick's German Church Johan Christian B. (c. 1731–70) and Marie Elisabeth Asmussen (died 1798). He was the paternal uncle of architect Johan Daniel Herholdt (1818–1902).

Herhold died on 18 February 1836 in Copenhagen. He is buried at Assistens Cemetery. A tombstone designed by G. F. Hetsch was installed in 1842. Adam Oehlenschläger commemorated him with a poem (published in Poetiske Skrifter, F.L. Liebenberg (editor), Selskabet til Udgivelse af Oehlenschlägers Skrifter, Volume 22, 1860, pp. 161–163).

== Awards ==
Herholdt was awarded the title of etatsråd in 1929. He was created a Knight of the Order of the Dannebrog in 1915 and was awarded the Cross of Honour in 1934.

Academic offices
Preceded by Frederik Theodor Hurtigkarl	Rector of University of Copenhagen; 1819–1820	Succeeded by Niels Schow
Preceded by Janus Lauritz Andreas Kolderup-Rosenvinge	Rector of University of Copenhagen; 1834–1835	Succeeded by Christian Thorning Engelstoft
