= Frederik Christian von Haven =

Danish philologist and theologian

- Born: June 26, 1728; Vester Skerninge, Funen, Denmark
- Died: May 25, 1763 (aged 34); Mokha, Yemen
- Known for: Danish expedition to Yemen

Frederik Christian von Haven (26 June 1728 – 25 May 1763) was a Danish philologist and theologian who took part in the Danish expedition to Yemen.

== Biography ==
=== Background and early life ===
Frederik von Haven was born on 26 June 1728 in the rectory of Vester Skerninge on the Danish island of Funen, where his father Lambert von Haven was a priest, and christened on 3 July in the Church of Our Lady in Odense. His mother was Maren, née Wielandt. He had three sisters; he was especially close to Pernille Elisabeth von Haven, who never married.

The von Haven family probably came from North Germany. They were in Bergen in Norway in the 17th century, and later moved to Denmark. The earliest Danish-born von Havens were painters or architects, for example Lambert van Haven (1630–1695), who designed the Thott Mansion, the dome hall of Charlottenborg Palace and all but the tower of the Church of Our Saviour in Copenhagen. Towards the end of the 17th century, von Haven sons started to become priests.

Frederik von Haven's father died in 1738, leaving his family in financial difficulty. With the assistance of relatives, Frederik was able to study at the Cathedral School in Odense and then become a student in theology at the University of Copenhagen. He earned his Master's degree in 1750 and received a scholarship which enabled him to travel to Göttingen for further study, amongst other subjects in Asian languages under the famous professor Johann David Michaelis.

=== Expedition to Arabia ===
The expedition to Arabia was Michaelis' idea; he was studying the Bible from comparative historical and linguistic perspectives, so determining details of life in the Middle East was important to his work. He considered that Yemen, being isolated, had preserved many traditions and social patterns from the biblical period. He wrote to King Frederick V to obtain his support for the venture, and the king agreed.

Originally Michaelis had planned to send missionaries from the Danish colony at Tranquebar, but decided instead to send trained scholars. Von Haven was chosen among other reasons because he had shown himself to be an accomplished linguist. When von Haven heard that Maronite monks from Syria were teaching at a college in Rome, he obtained a scholarship to go there and learn Arabic from them. There were also many Middle Eastern manuscripts in the Vatican Library, some of which would be useful. He left at the end of 1759 and remained abroad for about a year. In his absence, the other members of the expedition were appointed by Michaelis and the foreign minister, J. H. E. Bernstorff: the botanist Peter Forsskål, a pupil of Linnaeus, the mathematician and astronomer Carsten Niebuhr, the engraver and miniaturist Georg Wilhelm Baurenfeind, and the physician Christian Carl Kramer.

When von Haven returned to Copenhagen, he was appointed to a professorship, as was Forsskål. On 4 January 1761, the members of the expedition boarded the warship Grønland, which was to take them to Constantinople. However, bad weather forced the ship to return to Helsingør several times. Von Haven and a large part of the crew fell ill, because the drinking water had quickly become polluted. On 11 February, the ship was forced once more to return to Helsingør, and von Haven decided to travel overland to Marseille and join the expedition there. His journal of the expedition shows that he prepared thoroughly. For example, he watched Professor Kratzenstein in Copenhagen make plaster casts of inscriptions and demonstrate how he cut off a block of inscribed marble. In addition, he bought books and wrote to people who were considered authorities on Arab history, culture and language.

He arrived in Marseille on 8 May and rejoined the other expedition members on the Grønland when it arrived on 13 May. He had enjoyed himself in the city, going to theatrical performances and concerts and visiting prominent people, and writes in his expedition journal that he "wished they had stayed away for another 14 days".

On 3 June, the ship set sail from Marseille for Constantinople. On the way there, von Haven and Forsskål had a major disagreement which affected the entire expedition. In his journal, von Haven describes it as a minor discussion arising from Forsskål's dissatisfaction with Kramer's scholarly capabilities, which he won; he writes that Forsskål left the cabin, unable to respond. In Constantinople von Haven bought a few packets of arsenic, causing his colleagues to be afraid he intended to poison them; they wrote to Bernstorff and the Danish consul in Constantinople, von Gähler, to have him removed from the expedition. The effort was in vain, and in his journal von Haven does not devote a single word to the episode.

On 26 September, the expedition arrived in Alexandria in Egypt. There and in Cairo, von Haven made the vast majority of the manuscript purchases which formed part of his professional duties on the voyage. They stayed in Egypt for one year, and between 6 and 25 September 1762, von Haven and Carsten Niebuhr went on a trip to Sinai, where they were to inspect some inscriptions and visit Saint Catherine's Monastery at Mount Sinai, which was reputed to have a large library of rare manuscripts. However, they were led astray by their Arab guides and were not able to see the inscriptions on the mountain; and the monks would not let them into the monastery because they did not have a letter from the Patriarch of the Greek Orthodox Church. Von Haven sent a report of this failure to Bernstorff, who had sent word from Copenhagen asking about their progress. Bernstorff was dissatisfied with the response and wrote back that he expected better results, but since the post between Denmark and Egypt was slow, his letter did not arrive until long after von Haven's death.

=== Death ===
The expedition then continued on an Arab ship through the Red Sea and on 29 December arrived at the port of Loheia in Yemen. From there they traveled overland to the city of Mokha, stopping on the way in the desert city of Bayt al-Faqih. At this point most of them were sick. It was later established that they had malaria, but they believed it to be only a common cold. The sickness became worse. When they reached Mokha, von Haven was so unwell that he had to stay in bed in their rented house. Von Haven himself realised how serious his sickness was. On the afternoon of 25 May, with an unsteady hand, he wrote the last entry in his travel journal: "25 May 1763, morning: after midday God gave me, I believe, a blessed ending. I was born on 26 June 1728." He was buried in the Christian cemetery in Mokha, which still exists. The location of the grave is not known.

=== Scholarly results ===
Von Haven bought 116 manuscripts, which were given to the Royal Danish Library, where they still are. They include historical, geographical and linguistic texts, and in addition poetry in Arabic and Hebrew. There are seven Hebrew Bibles. Amongst others, the Oxford theologian Benjamin Kennicott used them in preparing his authoritative critical edition of the Old Testament. Many of the manuscripts are beautifully illustrated.

The journal shows that von Haven possessed good scholarly judgement and observational skills. For the last half year of his life, there are only notes. His field of study, philology, required much revision, so his findings in that area are difficult to assess today. The edited part of his journal is one of the best works of Danish prose of that stylistically not yet well developed period, on a par with Frederik Sneedorff's travel letters and Andreas Christian Hviid's travel diaries.

== Thorkild Hansen's Arabia Felix ==
The Arabian expedition is today mostly known through the writer Thorkild Hansen's 1962 documentary novel Arabia Felix: The Danish Expedition of 1761–1767 (Det lykkelige Arabien). In Hansen's book, Frederik von Haven is selfish, cowardly and lazy. He constantly tried to undermine the scholarly work which Forsskål and Niebuhr in particular are endeavouring to do. This stems from Hansen's interpretation of the sources; his main sources were two biographies of Forsskål, Carl Christensen's Naturforskeren Pehr Forsskål (1918) and Henrik Schück's Från Linnés tid. Peter Forsskål (1923). These are both very critical of von Haven. In addition he used the biography of Niebuhr by his son Barthold Georg Niebuhr.

Hansen presumably did not know about von Haven's travel journal, which existed as a manuscript in the Royal Danish Library (and was first printed in 2005). The only writings by von Haven himself used by Hansen were the report of the failed trip to Sinai and letters to friends and acquaintances. These letters are concerned only with personal matters and not with the work of the expedition, which has greatly impacted Hansen's picture of von Haven: he appears in the book as someone who thought only about comfort and good food, and complained constantly about bad health. That von Haven was headstrong and had an aversion to Forsskål—and was in general unsuited to an expedition of this kind—is not a view that his journal does much to dispel. However, it does show that he did his best with respect to the scholarly task, and that the accusations of laziness and poor excuses must be reevaluated. His problem was, as Hansen states in his novel, that the expedition spent most of its time at sea or in barren wastes and that there was little for a philologist to do in such places, while there was much for a cartographer and a botanist to do.

For literary reasons Hansen demonised von Haven: his negative aspects were to contrast with the heroes Niebuhr and Forsskål. Von Haven therefore plays the rôle in the book of "the indispensable bad guy".

== See also ==
- Lepidochrysops haveni, a butterfly species named in honor of von Haven
