= Christian Albrecht von Benzon =

Danish painter

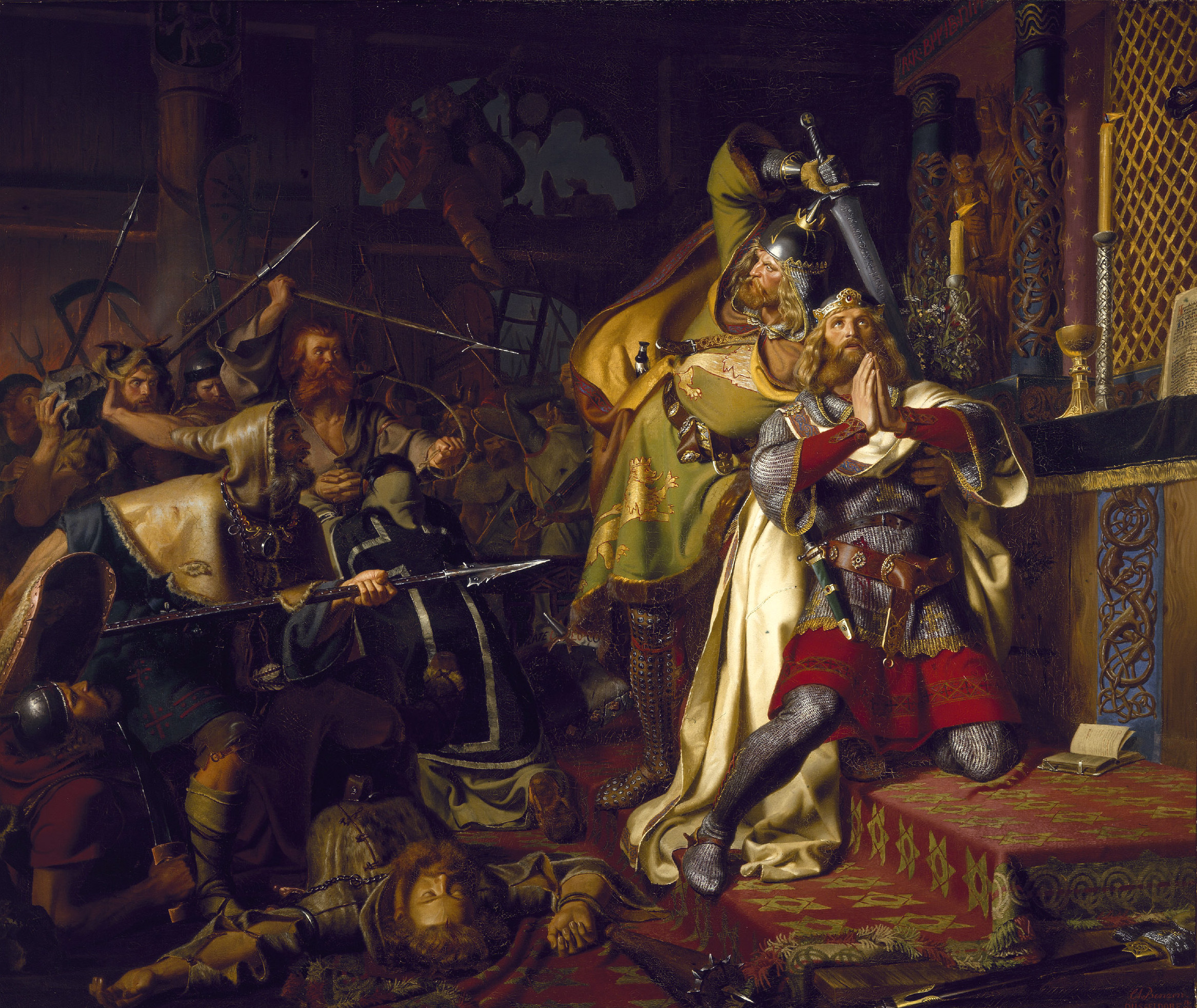
Death of Saint Canute (1843)

Christian Albrecht von Benzon (11 July 1816, in Copenhagen – 3 September 1849, in Paris) was a Danish painter.

== Life ==
=== Early life ===
He was the son of the royal kammerjunker Jakob von Benzon (who owned estates in Christiansdal, Tirsbæk and Ågård) and Sophie Catharine Holm, an opera singer at the Danish Royal Theatre. This made him part of the prominent Benzon family at Funen.

He took up an artistic career relatively late, after encouragement from an uncle, and studied at the Royal Danish Academy of Fine Arts in Copenhagen from 1833 to 1836, though he won no medals there. In 1835 he painted a portrait of Hans Christian Andersen (now in the Museum of National History at Frederiksborg Castle) – its subject called it "quite atrocious", though Weger used an engraving of it as the frontispiece for the edition of Andersen's writings which he published in Leipzig. Benzon also exhibited portraits, genre paintings and one history painting in Leipzig from 1836 to 1846.

=== Success in Düsseldorf and Paris ===
Encouraged by his professor J.L. Lund, in 1840 or 1841 Benzon travelled to Düsseldorf, where he married the painter Marie Therese Hubertine Rosalie Cazin – their home became the most brilliant cultural hub in the city according to the painter Elisabeth Jerichau Baumann. He sent back two paintings to Denmark from the city – in 1842 The Last Confession (also known as A Sinner on His Deathbed or The Death of Don Juan) and in 1844 The Death of Saint Canute.

In 1845 he travelled to Paris, from which he sent back The Norman Lord Hastings occupying an Italian city by stealth for the 1846 Charlottenborg Spring Exhibition. He also won a gold medal from Louis Philippe for Louis IV of France recognizing Richard I and his successors as dukes of Normandy in Rouen in the presence of Harald Bluetooth. However, he ended up in debtors' prison in Paris, where he died of cholera on 30 September 1849.

He belonged to the Düsseldorf School, which was rejected back in Denmark by the art historian N.L. Høyen due to its dark brown tone and palette.

== Works ==
- Portrait of H.C. Andersen (1835, Det Nationalhistoriske Museum på Frederiksborg Slot)
- Death of Saint Canute (1843, Funen's Art Museum)
- The Norman Lord Hastings occupying an Italian city by stealth (1846)
- Louis IV of France recognizing Richard I and his successors as dukes of Normandy in Rouen in the presence of Harald Bluetooth (Hôtel de Ville, Rouen)

He is also represented in Denmark's Royal Collection.
