= Hans Christian Knudsen (missionary) =

Norwegian missionary and painter

Hans Christian Knudsen ( March 18, 1816 - May 4, 1863) was a Norwegian missionary and painter. He was a pioneer Rhenish Missionary pioneer and scholar of Khoekhoe.

== Childhood and education ==
Knudsen was born at Bergen, Norway. He was the son of Frederik Thomas Knudsen and Annelis Johanne Marie Lie. He finished his training as a painter and lithograph at the Bergen Academy of Art and Design. He joined the Rhenish Missionary Society in Elberfeld-Barmen in 1836, and upon completing his training at the missionary institute was dispatched in 1841 to South West Africa to further the work of Heinrich Schmelen (1776–1848) who had been based at what is now Bethanie, Namibia.

== In South Africa ==
After a short sojourn with Schmelen in Komaggas in Namaqualand (at the time called Little Namaqualand), Knudsen took his post in Bethanie in November 1842. Though he still needed an interpreter to communicate in Nama, he built enough rapport to be trusted with codifying tribal laws previously held in oral tradition to reduce arbitrary caprices in their execution. The resulting code was adopted as tribal law in October 1848. The Nama in Berseba and Rehoboth adopted the same code with amendments. Although some provisions proved unworkable, the core of the legal corpus remains in force today and provided a foundation for agreement among the three subtribes based in the above towns and for further cultural development.

== In South West Africa ==
Knudsen traveled through the tribal territories around Bethanie and Berseba, writing their observations in diaries and reports. Knudsen drew and painted portraits of distinguished chieftains, scenes of village life, and ordinary Herero in Windhoek. He was the first European artist based in South West Africa. His works were published in the mission magazine and are currently displayed in the mission archives. The only works of his remaining in Southern Africa are two portraits of Khoikhoi at Stellenbosch University.

Knudsen's diaries attest to his already studying in depth the language and customs of the Nama, Damara (Herero), and San peoples. His findings conflict with those of the explorer Sir James Edward Alexander, especially in the 1844-1845 entries where he claims the Nama to be descended from the Ten Lost Tribes of Israel.

Oorlam Nama under chief Paul Goliath eagerly recruited his ministry and he established the mission of Gudbrandsdalen to serve them in an area that reminded him of his childhood home in the eponymous region.

Knudsen rebuilt in 1842 the stone cottage Schmelen had built in Bethanie in 1814 to reside until his 1834 departure, which had been razed in the interim. Still known as the Schmelen House, it has long been considered the oldest stone building in existence and the second ever built by Europeans on Namibian soil. The first, built by Wesleyan missionaries in 1806 in Warmbad, was destroyed by Jager Afrikaner, father of Jonker Afrikaner.

== Travel to Europe and marriage ==
Knudsen took leave to Europe in June 1847, presenting his work at missionary festivals and ultimately publishing Gross-Namaqualand ("Greater Namaqualand", Barmen, 1848). On a visit to Bergen, he married Petronella Christiansen.

== Return to Norway ==
On his return to Bethanie in 1849, he found his congregation abandoning Christianity and joining the raids of Jonker Afrikaner against the Herero boycotting the raids in protest, he was banished by the chief of Bethanie.

Bitterly disappointed, Knudsen roamed around missions in the Northern Cape, ending up in Tulbagh in 1852. Struggling to adapt and cope with his wife becoming mentally ill, he left the ministry in 1854 and returned to Norway. His wife died in an asylum and he made a meager living as a language teacher, magazine editor, and itinerant preacher, dying in Hattfjelldal, Norway; his two sons were adopted and raised by family members.

== Writings ==
Knudsen's first publication was Nama A.B.Z. kannis (Cape Town, 1845), a short book of prayers and readings with a glossary, English translation, and part of the catechism, the Ten Commandments, and other parts of the Holy Scriptures. Around the same time, he published an alphabet of sorts in the Nama language. Copies of both appear in the Grey collection in the National Library of South Africa Cape Town campus, complete with Knudsen's handwritten notes. The same collection includes his handwritten Südafrica: Das Hottentot-Volk: Notizzen ("South Africa: The Khoikhoi: Notes"), Stoff zu einer Grammatik in der Namaquasprache ("Fundamentals of Grammar in the Nama Language"), and Namaquasprache. These cover the geography and ethnography of Great Namaqualand as well as Khoekhoe syntax.

Knudsen's translation of the Gospel of Luke and the two aforementioned Cape Town publications were key sources for RMS Inspector J.C. Wallmann's Vocabular der Namaqua Sprache nebst einem Abrise der Formenlehre derselben ("Vocabulary of the Nama Language and Fundamentals of its Grammar," Barmen, 1854). His Gospel of Luke in Khoekhoe was published in Cape Town with some hymns in 1846 after a few productive years of learning the language with the help of two Nama translators. Though slightly proofread on spelling from the earlier publications, Wallmann's copy was rendered so meticulously that it was virtually free of printing errors, and Wilhelm Bleek described it in 1858 as "so far the best and most reliable source on [Khoekhoe]". Though somewhat rigid, it rendered idioms accurately.

In 1847, Knudsen worked on the publication of the Ryksboek, the first printed law book in the area; this was adopted by Orlam and Baster groups in nearby areas.

Examples of his work as a draftsman can be found in Norwegian museums and collections. He also painted portraits and watercolours.

== Sources ==
- Evangelical Lutheran Church Complex, Bethanie. URL accessed 17 April 2016.
- (af) De Kock, W.J. 1968. Suid-Afrikaanse Biografiese Woordeboek, vol I. Pretoria: Nasionale Raad vir Sosiale Navorsing, Departement van Hoër Onderwys.
- (en) Potgieter, D.J. 1972. Standard Encyclopaedia of Southern Africa, vol. VI. Cape Town: Nasionale Opvoedkundige Uitgewery Ltd.
