= Janus Lauritz Andreas Kolderup-Rosenvinge =

Danish jurist (1792–1850)

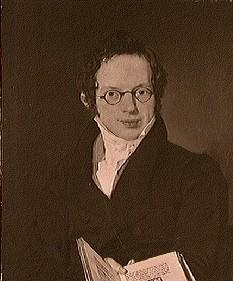
Portrait of Janus Lauritz Andreas Kolderup-Rosenvinge

Janus Lauritz Andreas Kolderup-Rosenvinge (10 May 1792 – 4 August 1850) was a Danish jurist and a leading historian of Danish law. He taught at the University of Copenhagen, of which he was the rector in 1833–34.

He is known for his Grundrids af den danske Lovhistorie (1822–23), the first systematic history of Danish law, and for his collections of sources about the same. Kolderup-Rosenvinge also wrote textbooks on police law, international law and church law.
