= Julie Reventlow =

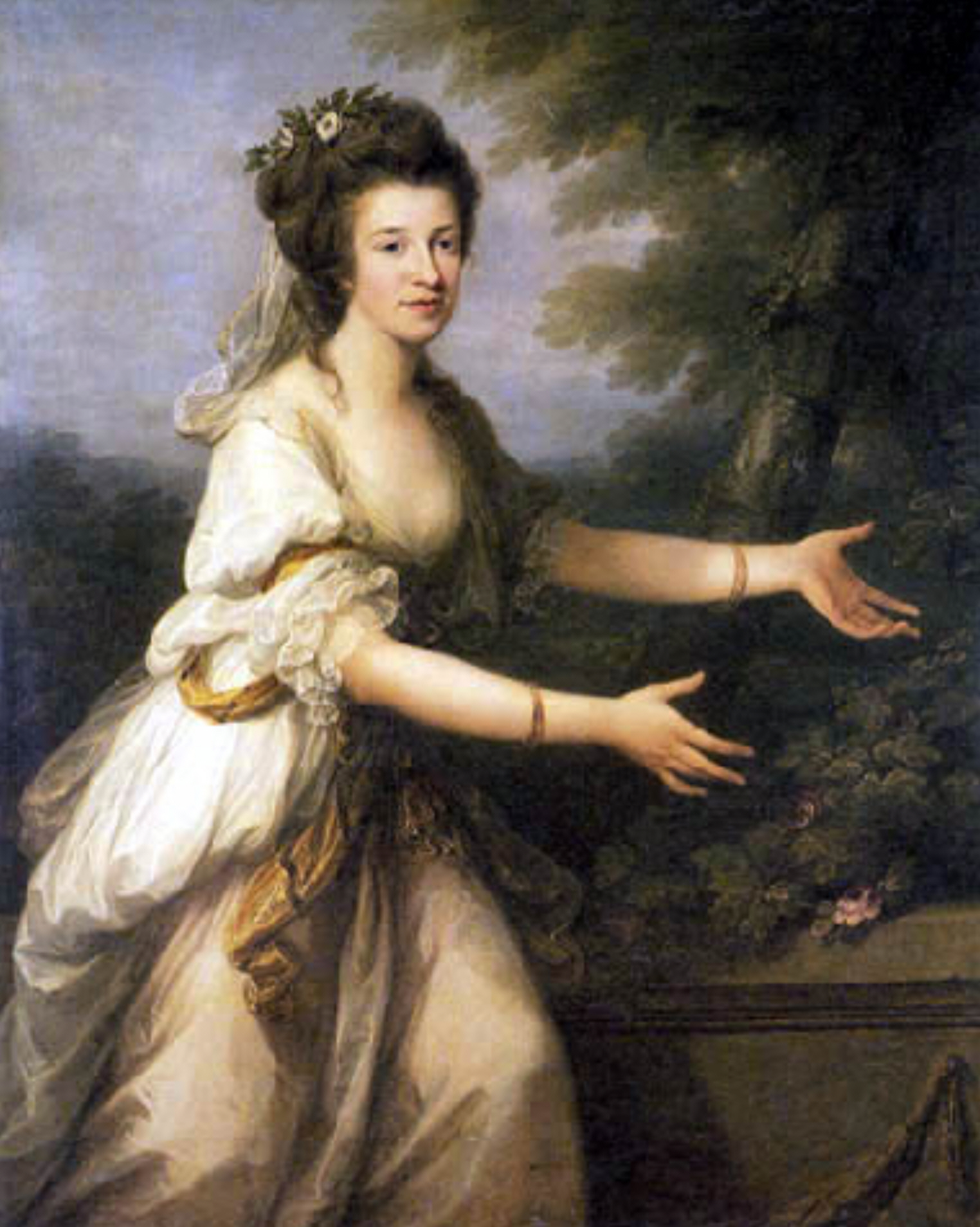
Frederike Juliane Reventlow. Angelika Kauffmann 1784.

Julie Reventlow (16 February 1763 – 28 December 1816), was a Danish countess, writer and the host of a literary salon.

She was the daughter of count Heinrich Carl von Schimmelmann and Caroline von Schimmelmann, sister of Heinrich Ernst Schimmelmann, and married count Frederik Reventlow (1755–1828) in 1779. She hosted a literary salon at the estate Emkendorf in Holstein, and published works about education.

== Works ==
- Sonntagsfreuden des Landmannes, 1791
- Kinderfreuden oder Unterricht in Gesprächen, 1793.
