= Hans Christian Knudsen =

Danish stage actor and opera singer

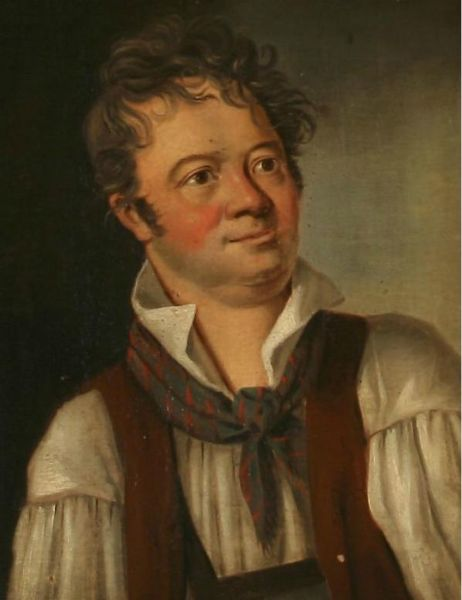
Hans Christian Knudsen, painted by C. W. Eckersberg

Hans Christian Knudsen (March 4, 1763 – March 4, 1816) was a Danish stage actor and opera singer. He was an elite actor of the Royal Danish Theatre from 1786 to 1816, known for his roles in theater comedy and opera performances. During the Battle of Copenhagen (1801) as well as the Battle of Copenhagen (1807), he was noted for having strengthened morale among the public as a patriotic singer and helping collect funds for the victims.
