= 1729 in Denmark =

- Decades: 1700s; 1710s; 1720s; 1730s; 1740s
- See also: Other events of 1729; List of years in Denmark

Events from the year 1729 in Denmark.

== Incumbents ==
- Monarch – Frederick IV
- Grand Chancellor – Ulrik Adolf Holstein

== Events ==
- Construction of Købmagergade 5 and Købmagergade 7 is completed following the Copenhagen Fire of 1728.

== Births ==
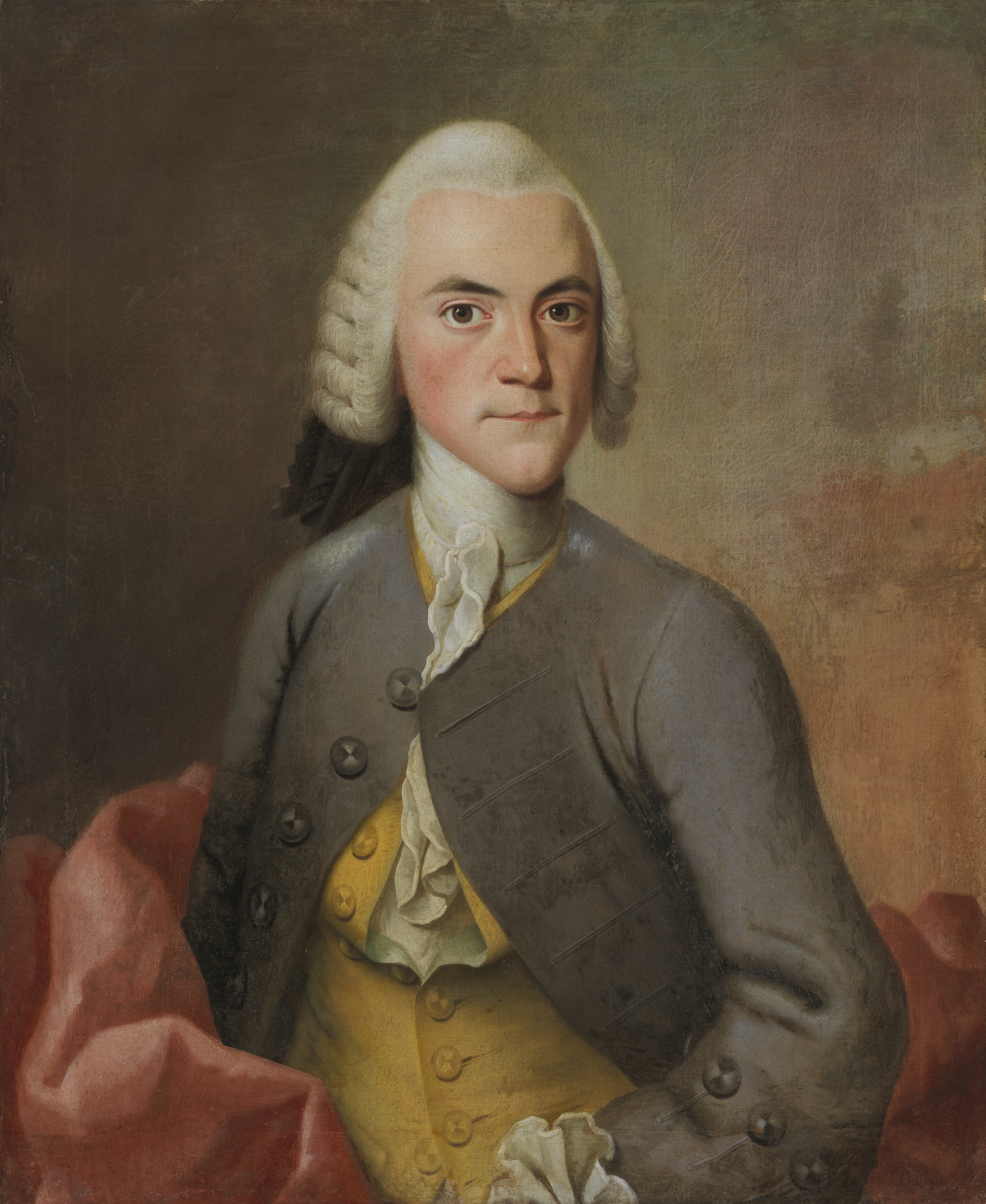
Jørgen Wichfeld,

- 6 March – Christian Hincheldey, businessman and landowner (died 1793)
- 21 April – Ulrik Christian Kaas, naval officer (died 1808)
- 1 July – Jørgen Wichfeld, landowner (died 1797)
- 12 July – Ulrich Wilhelm de Roepstorff, colonial administrator (died 1821)
- 26 August – Christian Henrik Biering, clergy and writer (died 1804)
- 2 December – Bernt Jensen Mørch, ship captain (died 1777)

== Deaths ==
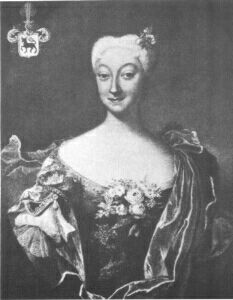
Charlotte Amalie Skeel.

- 28 April – Charlotte Amalie Skeel, noblewoman (born 1685)
- 8 June – Prince Charles of Denmark (born 1680)

=== Full date missing ===
- Anne Margrethe Bredal, writer (born 1655)
- Nicolai Wichmann, painter
