= Diederik Grit =

Dutch translator and translation scholar (1949–2012)

- Born: 22 March 1949; Groningen, Netherlands
- Died: 6 March 2012 (aged 62); Maastricht, Netherlands
- Education: Drachtster Lyceum; University of Groningen
- Occupations: Translator, Lecturer
- Writing career
- Language: Dutch

Diederik Christoph Grit (1949–2012) was a Dutch translator and translation scholar.

== Life ==
Born in Groningen on 22 March 1949, Grit moved to Friesland in his early teens and was educated in the Drachtster Lyceum. He went on to study Dutch at the University of Groningen, taking Danish and Norwegian as minors. After graduating he taught Dutch in a secondary school until 1979, when he became lecturer in Dutch at the University of Copenhagen, where he began compiling a bibliography of Dutch translations of Danish literature, published in 1986 as Dansk skønlitteratur i Nederland og Flandern 1731-1982. Bibliografi over oversaettelser og studier. His main research interest at this period was the reception of Danish literature in the Netherlands, and of Dutch literature in Denmark.

In 1982 he returned to the Netherlands, to teach at the Maastricht School of Translation, where he became known as a Dutch expert on the translation of realia. In 1994 he completed a doctorate at Maastricht University on the literary relations between the Netherlands and Scandinavia, Driewerf zalig Noorden - Over literaire betrekkingen tussen de Nederlanden en Scandinavië. He was a prolific book reviewer, particularly for the Tijdschrift voor Skandinavistiek. In the year 2000 he stopped teaching to become a full-time translator, translating both documents and works of literature. He translated ten books in collaboration with Edith Koenders, including the letters of Søren Kierkegaard. In 2006 the Leonora Christina Foundation awarded them the Amy van Marken translation prize for their translation of Thorkild Hansen's Arabia Felix.

Grit died in Maastricht on 6 March 2012.

== Works ==
=== Studies ===
- Dansk skønlitteratur i Nederland og Flandern 1731-1982. Bibliografi over oversaettelser og studier (1986)
- Driewerf zalig Noorden - Over literaire betrekkingen tussen de Nederlanden en Scandinavië (1994)

=== Translations ===
- Åsne Seierstad, De boekhandelaar van Kaboel, Breda 2003. A translation of The Bookseller of Kabul.
- Erling Jepsen, Vreselijk gelukkig, Amsterdam 2008 (with Edith Koenders). A translation of Terribly Happy.
- Thorkild Hansen, Jens Munk, Breda 2008 (with Edith Koenders).
- Søren Kierkegaard, Brieven Gorredijk 2009 (with Edith Koenders).
- Erling Jepsen, Met oprechte deelneming, Amsterdam 2010 (with Edith Koenders). A translation of The Art of Crying
