= Peter Forsskål =

Swedish explorer, orientalist and naturalist

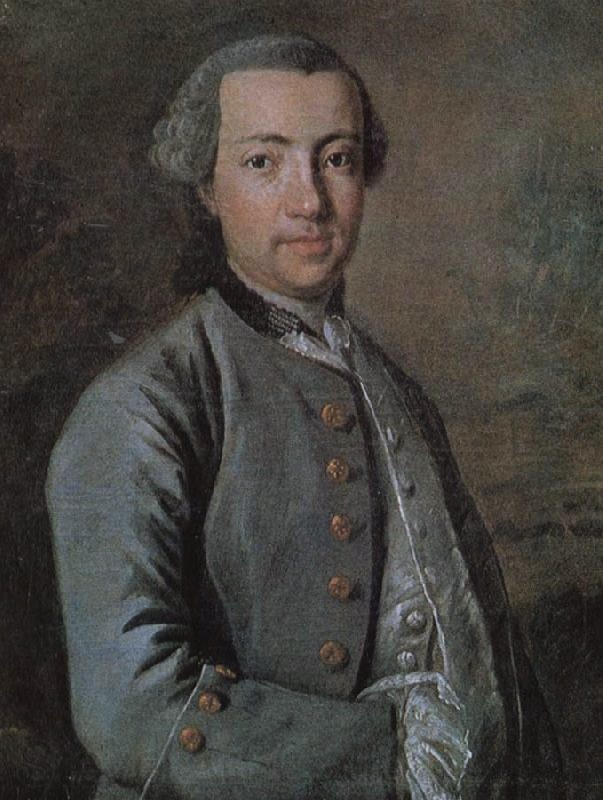
- Born: 11 January 1732; Helsinki, Uusimaa, Sweden (now Finland)
- Died: 11 July 1763 (aged 31); Yarim, Yemen
- Other names: Pehr Forsskål, Peter Forskaol, Petrus Forskål, Pehr Forsskåhl
- Citizenship: Swedish
- Education: Uppsala University, University of Göttingen
- Scientific career
- Fields: exploration, orientalism and natural history
- Author abbrev. (botany): Forssk.
- Author abbrev. (zoology): Forsskål

Peter Forsskål, sometimes spelled Pehr Forsskål, Peter Forskaol, Petrus Forskål or Pehr Forsskåhl (11 January 1732 – 11 July 1763) was a Finnish-born Swedish explorer, orientalist, naturalist, and an apostle of Carl Linnaeus.

== Early life ==
Forsskål was born in Helsingfors, now in Finland but then a part of Sweden, where his father, the priest Johannes Forsskål, was serving as a Lutheran clergyman, but the family moved to Sweden in 1741 when the father was appointed to the parish of Tegelsmora in Uppland and the archdiocese of Uppsala. As was common at the time, he enrolled at Uppsala University at a young age in 1742, but returned home for some time and, after studies on his own, rematriculated in Uppsala in 1751, where he completed a theological degree the same year.

== Linnaeus's disciple ==
In Uppsala Forsskål was one of the students of Linnaeus, but apparently also studied with the orientalist Carl Aurivillius, whose contacts with the Göttingen orientalist Johann David Michaelis are probably the reason why Forsskål travelled to the University of Göttingen in 1753; he studied Oriental languages and Philosophy and completed a doctorate there with a dissertation entitled Dubia de principiis philosophiae recentioris (1756). Returning to Uppsala in 1756, he wanted to pursue studies in economics.

In November 1759, he published a political pamphlet called, in Swedish, Tankar om borgerliga friheten (Thoughts on civil liberty). As it advocated complete freedom of the press, it was at the time controversial and was consequently suppressed by the authorities on the day of publication. The pamphlet was censored by the "Hats" government and caused him to be warned by the Royal Chancellery.

== Journey to Yemen and death ==
On Michaelis's recommendation, and with Linnaeus's approval, Forsskål the next year (1760) was appointed by Frederick V of Denmark to join, amongst others, the orientalist and mathematician Carsten Niebuhr on an expedition to Arabia. The group first went to Egypt where they stayed for about a year, with Forsskål pursuing studies in Arabic dialects, and arrived in South Arabia (Arabia Felix, present-day Yemen) at the end of December 1762. Just 31 years old, Forsskål worked hard on collecting botanical and zoological specimens, but fell ill with malaria and died in July 1763. He was buried at night in Yarim, Yemen.

Linnaeus mourned the death of his young student and named one of the plants Forsskål had sent home Forsskaolea tenacissima because the plant was as stubborn and persistent as the young man had been.

The entire journey of this Danish expedition was the subject of Thorkild Hansen's book Det lykkelige Arabien (1962, translated into English as Arabia Felix).

== Legacy ==
Forsskål's companion Niebuhr, who was the only one of the participants to survive the expedition, was entrusted with the care of editing his manuscripts, and published in 1775 Descriptiones Animalium – Avium, amphiborum, insectorum, vermium quæ in itinere orientali observavit Petrus Forskål. In the same year his account of the plants of Yemen and of lower Egypt also appeared, under the title of Flora Ægyptiaco-Arabica sive descriptiones plantarum quas per Ægyptum Inferiorem et Arabiam felicem detexit, illustravit Petrus Forskål. Most of his specimens were lost in transport or deteriorated due to bad storage in Copenhagen; his herbarium was reconstructed some 150 years after his death by the botanist Carl Christensen.

In his taxonomy work, Forsskål assigned the local Arabic name of the fish as the Latin species name: so they reflect the names used then (and now) on the coasts of the Red Sea for many species of fish.

In his pamphlet, Thoughts on Civil Liberty (1759), Forsskål argues the case for civil liberties of the kind people in modern democracies take for granted. A sample (para 21):

Finally, another important right in any free society is the liberty to contribute to the Public Good. But for this to happen, it must be possible to make the state of affairs in society known to one and all, and everyone must be free to express their thoughts about it. Where this is lacking, liberty is not worth its name.

Shortly after its publication the pamphlet was banned, and Forsskål was forced into exile. But only seven years later, in 1766, freedom of the press was given protection in Swedish constitutional law – the first such legislation in world history. (Under the reign of Gustaf III Sweden fell back into repression. Freedom of the press was reinstated in the Constitution of 1809.)

== Species named in his honor ==
The tiger fish Hydrocynus forskahlii was named in his honor by Georges Cuvier. Forsskål originally reported this species as Salmo (=Alestes) dentex in 1775.

The siphonophore Forskalia in the monotypic family Forskaliidae was named in his honor by Kölliker.

The black sea cucumber Holothuria forskali was named in his honor by Delle Chiaje.

The plant genus Forsskaolea L. was named in his honor.

Many plants also bear his name in the epithet, among which :

- Gymnosporia forsskaoliana (Sebsebe) Jordaan, Celastraceae.
- Dracaena forskaliana (Schult. f.) Byng & Christenh., Asparagaceae.
- Cynanchum forskaolianum (Schult.) Meve & Liede, Apocynaceae.
- Viola forskaalii Greuter, Violaceae.
- Centropodia forskaolii (Vahl) Cope, Poaceae.
- Helichrysum forskahlii (J. F. Gmel.) Hilliard & B. L. Burtt, Asteraceae.
- Aneilema forskaolii Kunth, Commelinaceae.
- Ruellia forsskaolii Thulin, Acanthaceae.

His name is one of those with most variants, as botanists are free to choose their latinization, and the transcription to the vowel å has varied through time.

== Variant spellings of his name ==
In subsequent botanical works many different variants of his name were recorded (Forsskål, Forskål, Forskåhl, Forsskåhl, Forsskaal, Forskal, Forsskal, occasionally also Forsskaol). For citing the scientist's name it was recommended not to replace å by a. Family members in these times used three alternative spellings Forsskål, Forskål and Forsskåhl. Modern members of the family seem to prefer Forsskåhl. Peter's father and brother used the spelling Forsskåhl. Peter himself alternatively used Forsskål and Forsskaal, in approximately the same frequency, but the choice depended on the language of a letter's recipient. In one letter to England he once spelled his name Forsskol. Linnæus spelled Peter's name Forskåhl, not in agreement with the student's father. In publications issued during Peter's lifetime the spelling Forsskål was used, including in his dissertation issued in 1756 in Göttingen.

In the important work Descriptiones animalium which was published 12 years after his death and which was attributed to him the spelling "Forskål" had been used. In current zoological sources both spellings Forskål and Forsskål are in use, Forskåhl and Forsskåhl are not used.

== Publications ==
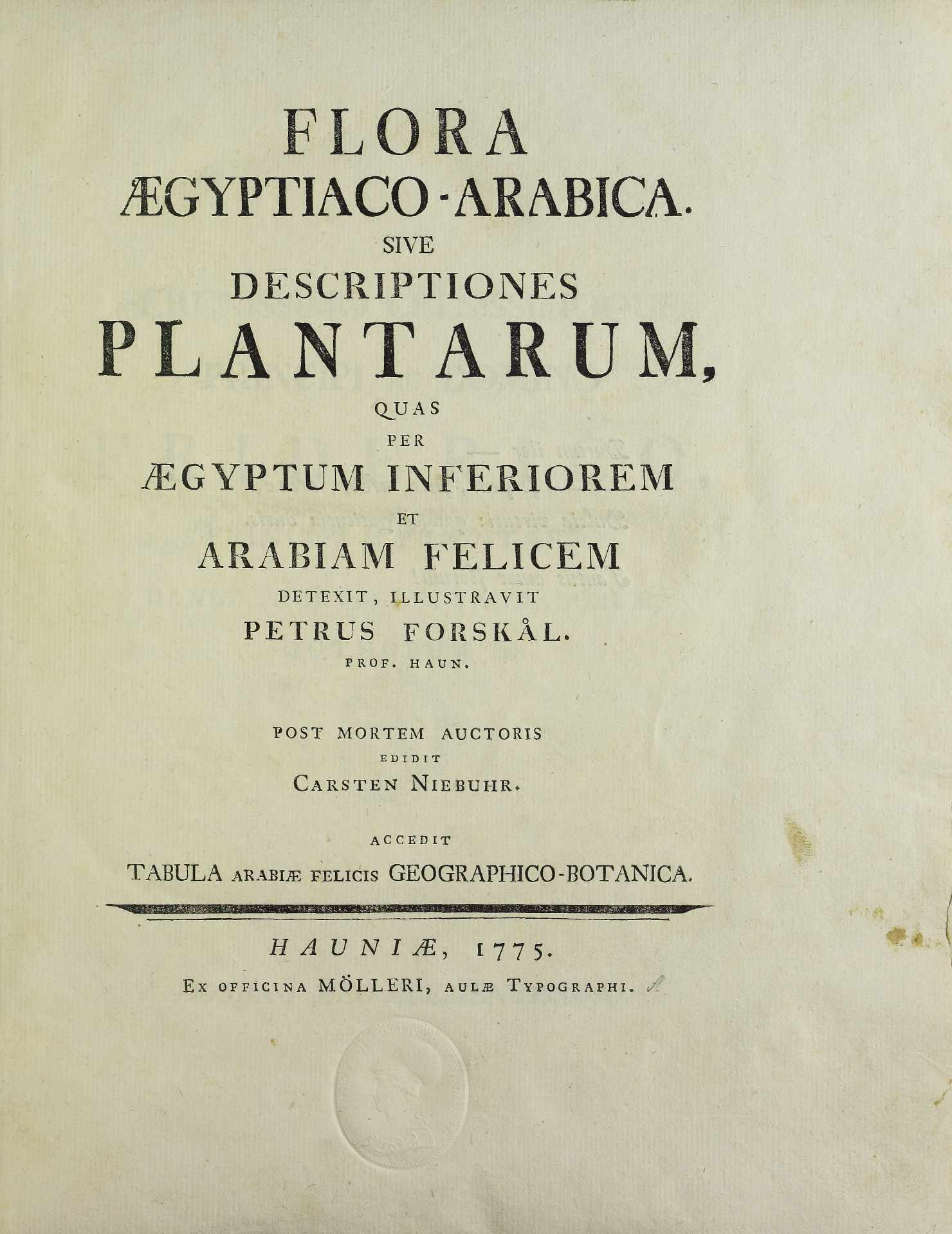
Flora Aegyptiaco-Arabica, 1775

1. Thoughts on Civil Liberty / Tankar om borgerliga friheten (1759). Stockholm: Bokförlaget Atlantis, 2009. ISBN 978-91-7353-360-7. [Edited and translated by David Goldberg, Gunilla Jonsson, Helena Jäderblom, Gunnar Persson and Thomas von Vegesack, assisted by David Shaw.] (Swedish Wikisource)
2. * Flora Aegyptiaco-Arabica (in Latin). København: Nicolaus Möller. 1775.
3. * Descriptiones animalium (in Latin). København: Nicolaus Möller. 1775.
4. * Icones rerum naturalium (in Latin). København: Nicolaus Möller. 1776.
5. Resa till lyklige Arabien. 1950.

== See also ==
- Category:Taxa named by Peter Forsskål
