= Bernt Jensen Mørch =

Danish ship captain and slave trader

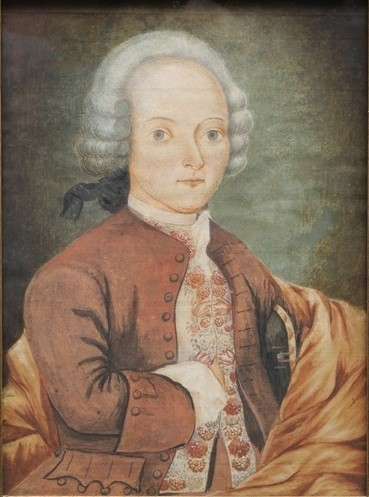
Bernt Jensen Mørch, unknown artist.

Bernt Jensen Mørch (2 December 1729 – 14 November 1777) was a Danish sea captain who sailed in the Triangle Trade. He is known from the author Thorkild Hansen's slave trilogy (Coast of Slaves, Ships of Slaves, Islands of Slaves).

== Early life and education ==
Mørch was born on 2 December 1729 in Christianshavn, the son of sea captain Jens Jørgensen (Mørch) (ca. 1670–1758) and Anna Marie Andersdatter (died 1730). He went to sea at the age of 16. In 1748, he was understyrmand on board the slave ship Neptunus. In August 1755, he acquired citizenship as a skipper in Copenhagen.

== Career ==
In 1753, Mørch joined the Danish West India–Guinea Company. In 1755, he captained the company's ship Ebenezer on a voyage to Danish Gold Coast and Danish West India. From 1759 to 1762, he captained Debora on a similar voyage. 197 of the 228 enslaved Africans survived the voyage from the Danish Gold Coast to Saint Croix. From 1762 to 1764, he captained the General Trade Company's frigate Fortet Christiansborg.

In 1777, Mørch became captain of Christiansborg. He sailed from Copenhagen in April, bound for the Danish Gold Coast. He died on board the ship off Fort Christiansborg in November. He was buried on land. A fellow crew member created a drawing of his tomb for his wife.

== Personal life ==
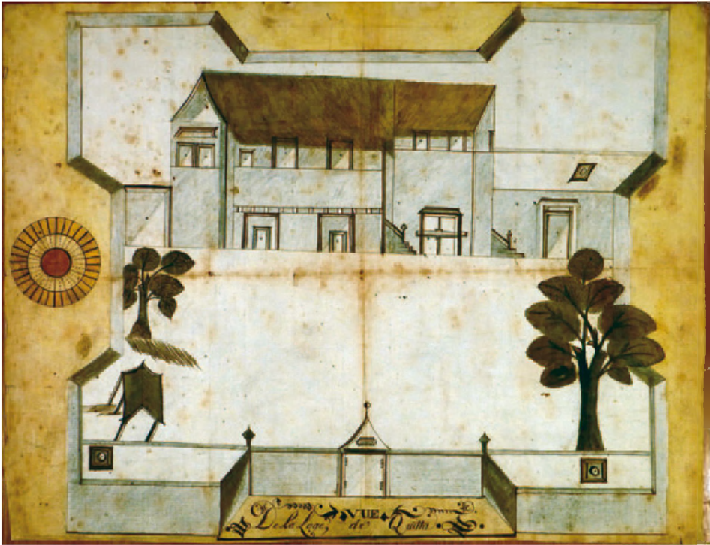
Drawing of Mørch's tomb at Fort Christiansborg, created by one of his fellow crew members for his wife.

Mørch was married to Helena Mogensdatter Råbe (1729–1763) on 10 October 1753. She was a daughter of the sea captain Mogens Råbe. The couple had a son and two daughters. His wife died in 1763. On 19 August 1767, he was married to Karen (Kathrine) Larsdatter (1735–1800). She was a daughter of sea captain Hans Bendsen. His second wife bore him another daughter, Dorothea (Dorte) Sophia. In 1768, he bought a house overlooking Christianshavn Canal (Overgaden Oven Vandet 36, now demolished) for 3,000 Danish rigsdaler.
