= 1777 in Denmark =

- Decades: 1750s; 1760s; 1770s; 1780s; 1790s
- See also: Other events of 1777; List of years in Denmark

Events from the year 1777 in Denmark.

== Incumbents ==
- Monarch – Christian VII
- Prime minister – Ove Høegh-Guldberg

== Events ==
- 23 July – The brothers Jørgen Wichmand and Thomas Frederik Wichmand were ennobled by letters patent under the name Wichfeld.
- 2 September – HD;S Justitia is launched at Orlogsværftet on Nyholm in Copenhagen.

=== Undated ===
- The pioneer acting academy Det Dramatiske Selskab is founded.
- Danish India is turned over to the government by the Danish Asiatic Company and becomes a Danish–Norwegian crown colony.
- Peter Johansen establishes the shipyard Petersværft on his new Petersgaard estate.

== Births ==
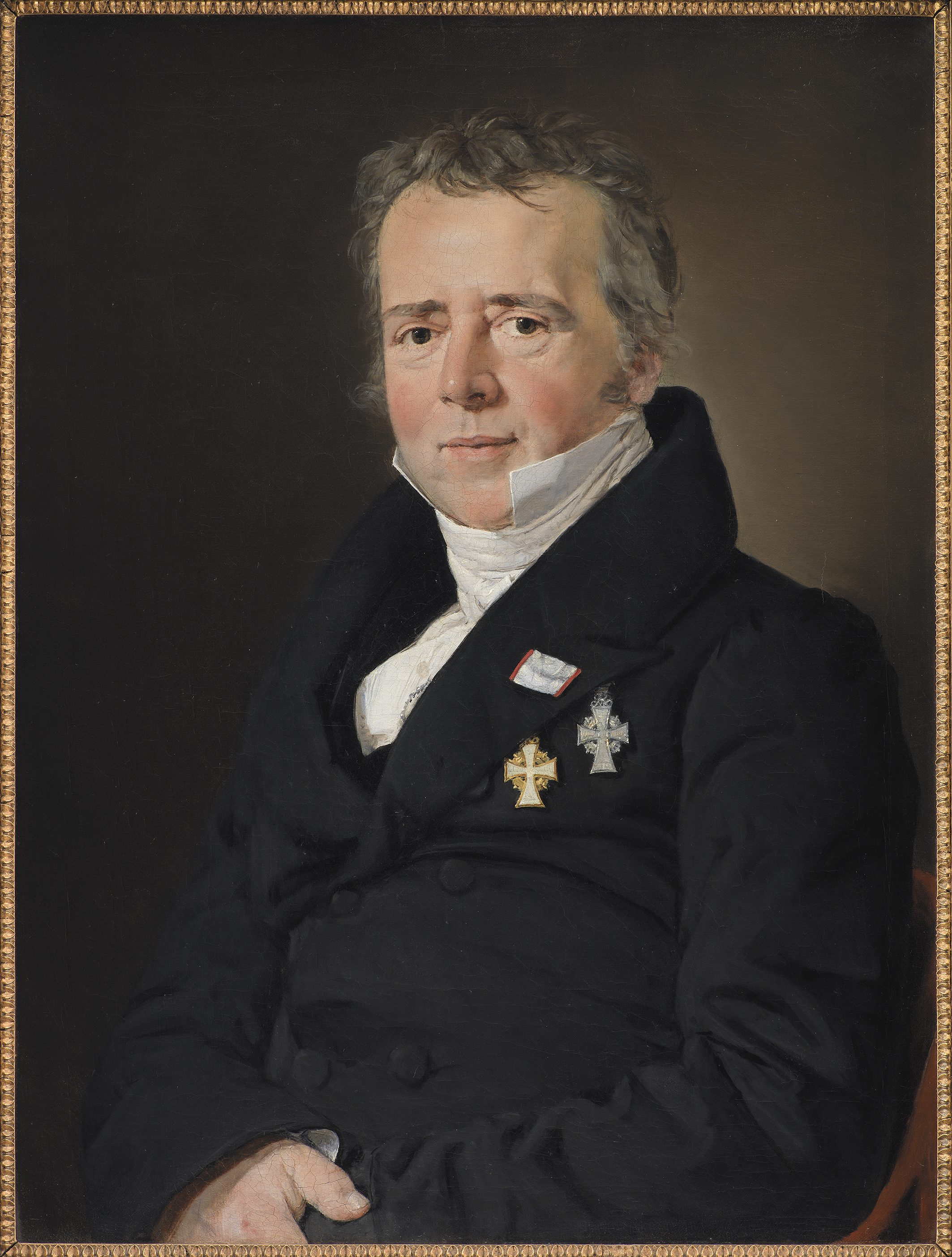
Hans Christian Ørsted.

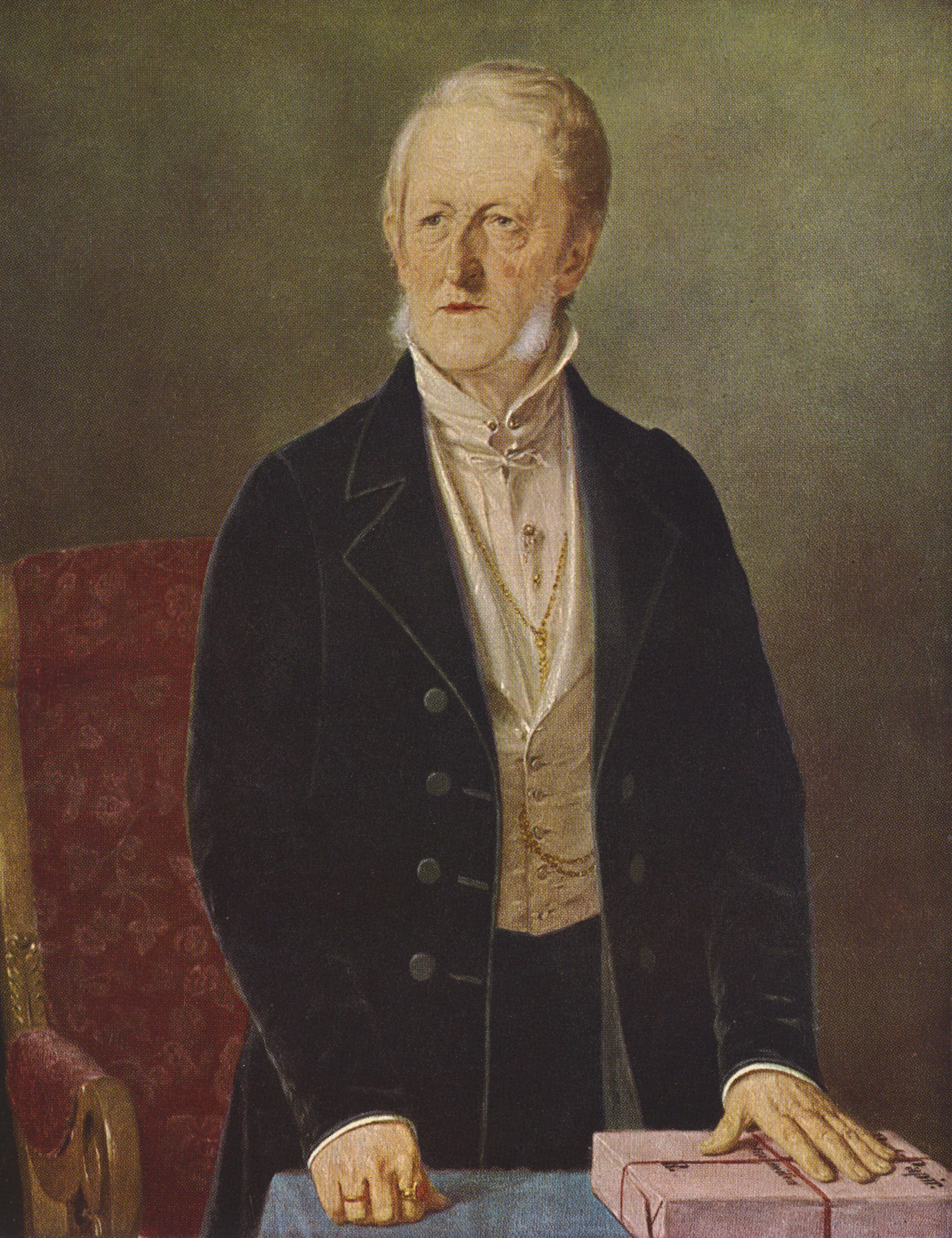
Johan Christian Drewsen.

- 21 February – Christian Wulff, naval officer (died 1843)
- 9 May – Johannes Søbøtker, merchant, plantation owner and governor (died 1854)
- 10 July – Hans Vilhelm Cederfeld de Simonsen, landowner and government official (born 1836)
- 14 August - Hans Christian Ørsted, physicist and chemist, discoverer of electromagnetism (died 1851)
- 15 October – Christian David Gebauer, painter (died 1831)
- 16 October - Johan Ludwig Lund, painter (died 1867)
- 27 October – Lauritz Nicolai Hvidt, businessman (died 1856)
- 18 November – Thomas Blom, master mason and architect (died 1841)
- 23 December – Johan Christian Drewsen, businessman and agronomist (died 1851)

== Deaths ==
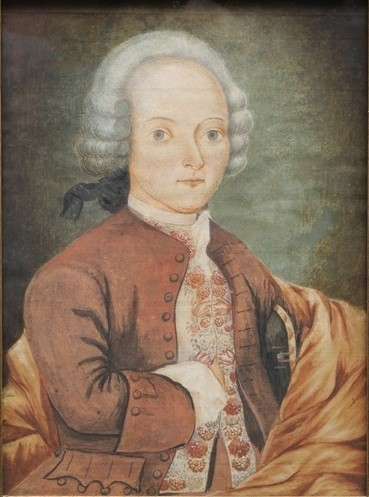
Bernt Jensen Mørch.

- 14 November – Bernt Jensen Mørch, ship captain (born 1729)
