= Fredensborg (slave ship) =

Norwegian slave trade ship

Coordinates: 58°30′43″N 8°56′54″E

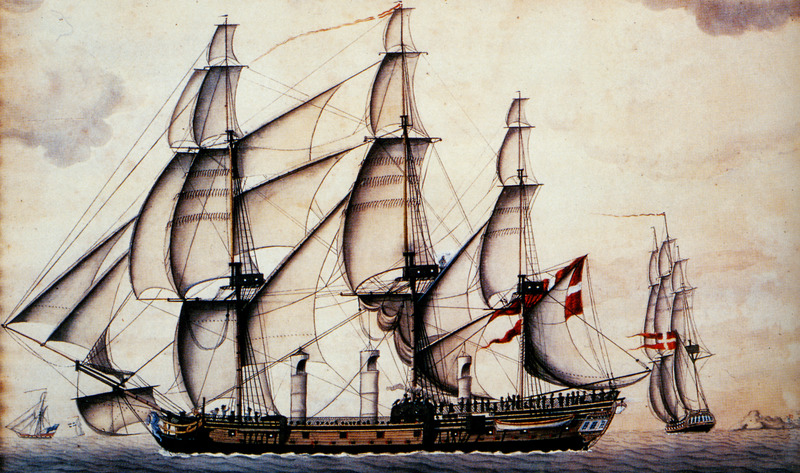
- Drawing of Fredensborg II (1788), later slave ship of the same name and design

History

Denmark-Norway
- Name: Cron Prindz Christian
- Builder: Built in Copenhagen
- Launched: 1753
- Renamed: Fredensborg, 1756
- Fate: Sank in a storm on 1 December 1768

Fredensborg was a frigate built in Copenhagen in 1753. She was originally named Cron Prindz Christian after the crown prince, the future king Christian VII of Denmark and Norway, and was fitted out as a slave ship.

== Service ==
=== As Cron Printz Christian ===
Following an initially unsuccessful stint in the triangular trade, her operational area was limited to the Caribbean, where she sailed as a trader until 1756.

=== As Fredensborg ===
The ship was then purchased by another Danish company, which renamed her Fredensborg after Fort Fredensborg, one of the Dano-Norwegian trading stations on the Danish Gold Coast. Her owners put her under the command of Captain Espen Kiønigs.

She embarked from Copenhagen on 24 June 1767 and arrived off the West African coast on 1 October. She acquired captives at Fort Christiansborg and Fort Fredensborg, and the ship set sail for the Danish West Indies on 21 April 1768. She arrived at St Croix on 9 July, where she landed her captives. She had embarked 265 captives, and she disembarked 235, for a loss rate of 11%. Of the crew of 40, 12 had died en route. At some point Johan Frantzen Ferentz replaced Kiønigs as captain. She then sailed for home on 14 September.

== Fate ==
On 1 December 1768, the Fredensborg sank in a storm off Tromøya island near Arendal, Norway.

The wreck was discovered in September 1974, by three divers: Leif Svalesen, Tore Svalesen, and Odd Keilon Osmundsen. Leif Svalesen later worked extensively to document the ship and its history.

== See also ==
- Fredensborg Castle
- Fort Fredensborg
- Danish slave trade
- Christiansborg (slave ship)

== Literature ==
- Leif Svalesen: Slave Ship Fredensborg. Indiana University Press. 2000. ISBN 9780253337771
