= Christiansborg (slave ship) =

Danish slave ship

Christiansborg was the first of six ships acquired by the Danish Guinea Company for use in the Triangle Trade. She was named for Fort Christiansborg on the Danish Gold Coast.

== History ==
=== 1766–1767 ===
Christiansborg sailed from Copenhagen on 6 July 1766, bound for the Danish Gold Coast. She sailed from the Danish Gold Coast on 21 February 1767, bound for Saint Croix in the Danish West Indies. 235 of the enslaved Africans were still alive when the ship reached her destination approximately three months later. They were sold for 30,755 Danish rigsdaler

=== 1774–1776 ===
Christiansborg was captained by Johan Frandsen Ferentz on her second enslaving voyage. The ship saluted Kronborg Castle on 23 March 1774 to mark the beginning of her voyage. The West African coast was first sighted on 1 August. A cargo of 393 enslaved Africans were was acquired from local slave traders at Fort Christiansborg, Fort Fredensborg and Quitta.

Ferentz set sail from Christiansborg on 25 February 1776, bound for Saint Croix. The next morning a slave revolt broke out on board the ship. The crew managed the regain control of the deck. On 28 February, Ferentz managed to get the ship back to Fort Fredensborg for assistance. 44 captives were killed and around 60 were seriously wounded. The ship was subsequently under repair while new provisions and captives were taken on board. Christiansborg was finally able to depart from Fort Fredensborg on 17 March, now with 336 enslaved Africans on aboard. Christiansted, Saint Croix, was reached exactly three months later. 83 captives had died during the voyage. Another seven died before they were transported ashore one week later.

Christiansborg sailed from Cristiansted on 3 August 1885, bound for Copenhagen. Both on the Atlantic Ocean and the North Sea, she was badly damaged in stormy weather. In October, she called at Mandal in Southern Norway. This resulted in a ten-month delay. The vessel finally arrived back at Copenhagen on 24 August 1776.

=== 1777–1779 ===
Christiansborg was captained by Bernt Jensen Mørch on her third enslaving voyage. She sailed from Copenhagen in April 1777, bound for the Danish Gold Coast. Mærch died off Fort Christiansborg in November. He was buried on land.

=== Fate ===
The fate of the ship is unknown. Another ship was given the name Christiansborg by the Danish Guinea Company in 1781. This ship was acquired from the grønlandske, islandske-finmarkske og guineiske Selskabe. It was constructed at the Royal Danish Greenland Company's shipyard in 1776 under supervision of master shipbuilder Erik Eskildsen. In 1782, she made her first voyage to the Danish Gold Coast. Jens Jensen Berg was part of the crew. He later captained the ship on two expeditions in the Triangle Trade.
