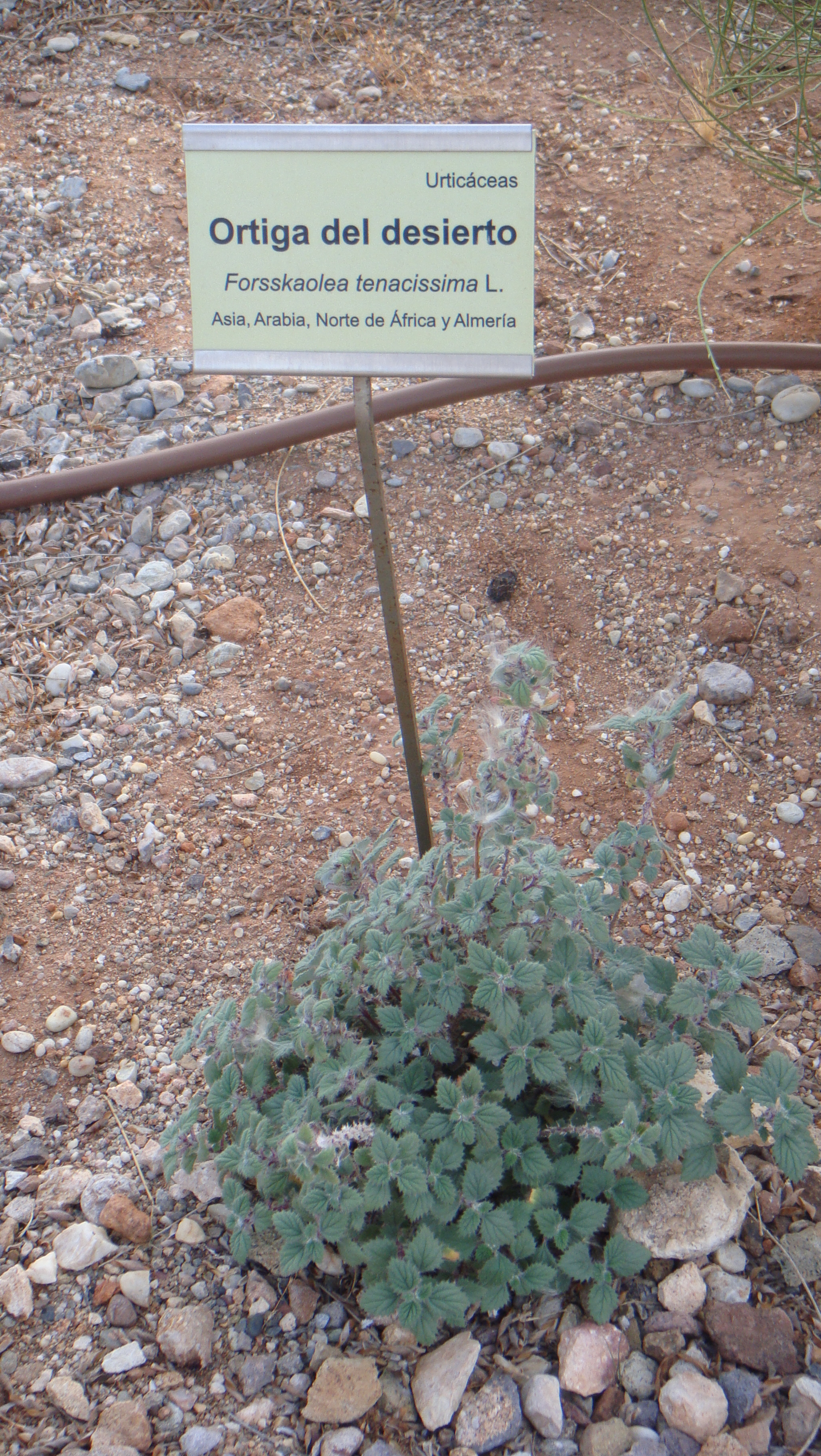

Scientific classification
- Kingdom: Plantae
- Clade: Tracheophytes
- Clade: Angiosperms
- Clade: Eudicots
- Clade: Rosids
- Order: Rosales
- Family: Urticaceae
- Genus: Forsskaolea
- Species: F. tenacissima

Binomial name
- Forsskaolea tenacissima L.

Synonyms
- Forskohlea tenacissima Caidbeja adhaerens Forssk. Forsskaolea cossoniana Webb. Forsskalea tenacissima L.

= Forsskaolea tenacissima =

Species of flowering plant

Forsskaolea tenacissima is a member of the non-stinging nettles genus Forsskaolea and is in the same family as the stinging kind, Urticaceae. Described as "looking like a tough character that does not want or need a caress", F. tenacissima makes its home where not many plant species survive, in stony soils, road edges, in the gravel wadi and "in the rock crevices and water-receiving depressions" above the stone pavements of the Hamadas.

Forsskaolea tenacissima was named in mourning of a student of Carl Linnaeus, a Swede named Peter Forsskål, who died while gathering botanical and zoological specimens from the Arabia Felix. Linnaeus named this plant Forsskaolea tenacissima because the plant was as stubborn and persistent as the student had been.

== Description ==
The almost upright 65 centimetres (26 in) fleshy, stiff-haired, woody annual F. tenacissima appears after the rains in rocky and difficult to grow in places like the Sahel of Mauritania, and Northeast Africa (the Horn of Africa), and now recorded in Niger. It is a chamaephyte that is much relished by livestock.

Leaves and stems
5 millimetres (0.20 in) to 20 millimetres (0.79 in) leaf stalks. Broad-side of leaves are squared-oval to round 1 centimetre (0.39 in) to 5 centimetres (2.0 in) long and 1 centimetre (0.39 in) to 7 centimetres (2.8 in) wide. Upper leaf surfaces have straight and hooked hairs and the lower leaf is densely white-wooly with hair. Small leafy outgrowth at the base of the leaf are rounded, 3 millimetres (0.12 in) to 5 millimetres (0.20 in) long, 1.5 millimetres (0.059 in) to 2.5 millimetres (0.098 in) wide, persistent and dry—not green.
Flowers
Five involucral bracts narrow and tapering to a point, 5 millimetres (0.20 in) to 6 millimetres (0.24 in) long and densely wooly. Four to eight male flowers and two to six female flowers in the center of the flower head which is attached right to the stem. Three unequal sepals; 3 millimetres (0.12 in) long stamen with a pointy anther and a conical 2 millimetres (0.079 in) long ovary which is surrounded with dense wool. The stigma is as long as the ovary.
Seeds
Achenes are elliptical, reddish-brown and 2 millimetres (0.079 in) long.

Communities
In Spain, F. tenacissima has been observed in a phytosociological situation (made "on the rocks" or in the gravel wadis of Tabernas Desert) with Senecio flavus.

F. tenacissima has been observed living low in wadis with these plant species:

- Acacia tortilis
- Aerva javanica
- Lotononis platycarpa
- Farsetia longisiliqua

It has also been found growing in rock crevices and water-receiving depressions above the stone pavements of the Hamadas along with:

- Anastatica hierochuntica
- Fagonia latifolia
- Farsetia aegyptia
- Nauplius graveolens
- Reseda villosa
- Salvia aegyptiaca
- Enneapogon desvauxii
- Enneapogon scaber

== Distribution ==
Common in arid and semi-arid waste lands in sandy clay gravelly soils from sea level to 1,200 metres (3,900 ft) like Mediterranean woodlands and shrublands, semi-steppe shrublands, shrub-steppes, deserts and extreme deserts.

Native
Palearctic:

Northern Africa: Algeria, Egypt
Southwestern Europe: Spain
Southeastern Europe: Malta
Western Asia: Israel, Jordan, Libya, Palestine, Sinai, Tunisia

Current
Palearctic:

Northern Africa: Algeria, Egypt
Southwestern Europe: Spain
Southeastern Europe: Malta
Western Asia: Afghanistan, Iran, Israel, Jordan, Libya, Pakistan, Palestine, Sinai, Tunisia
Asia Temperate: India

Afrotropic:

Arabian Peninsula: Saudi Arabia, Oman, United Arab Emirates
Northeast Tropical Africa: Eritrea
West Tropical Africa: Mauritania

== Uses ==
The inner bark is used by natives in Sahara for manufacturing rope.

== Synonyms ==
- Forsskaolea tenacissima L. var. cossoniana (Webb) Batt.
- Forsskaolea tenacissima L. var. erythraea A.Terracc.
- Forsskaolea tenacissima L. var. cossoniana (Webb) Batt.
