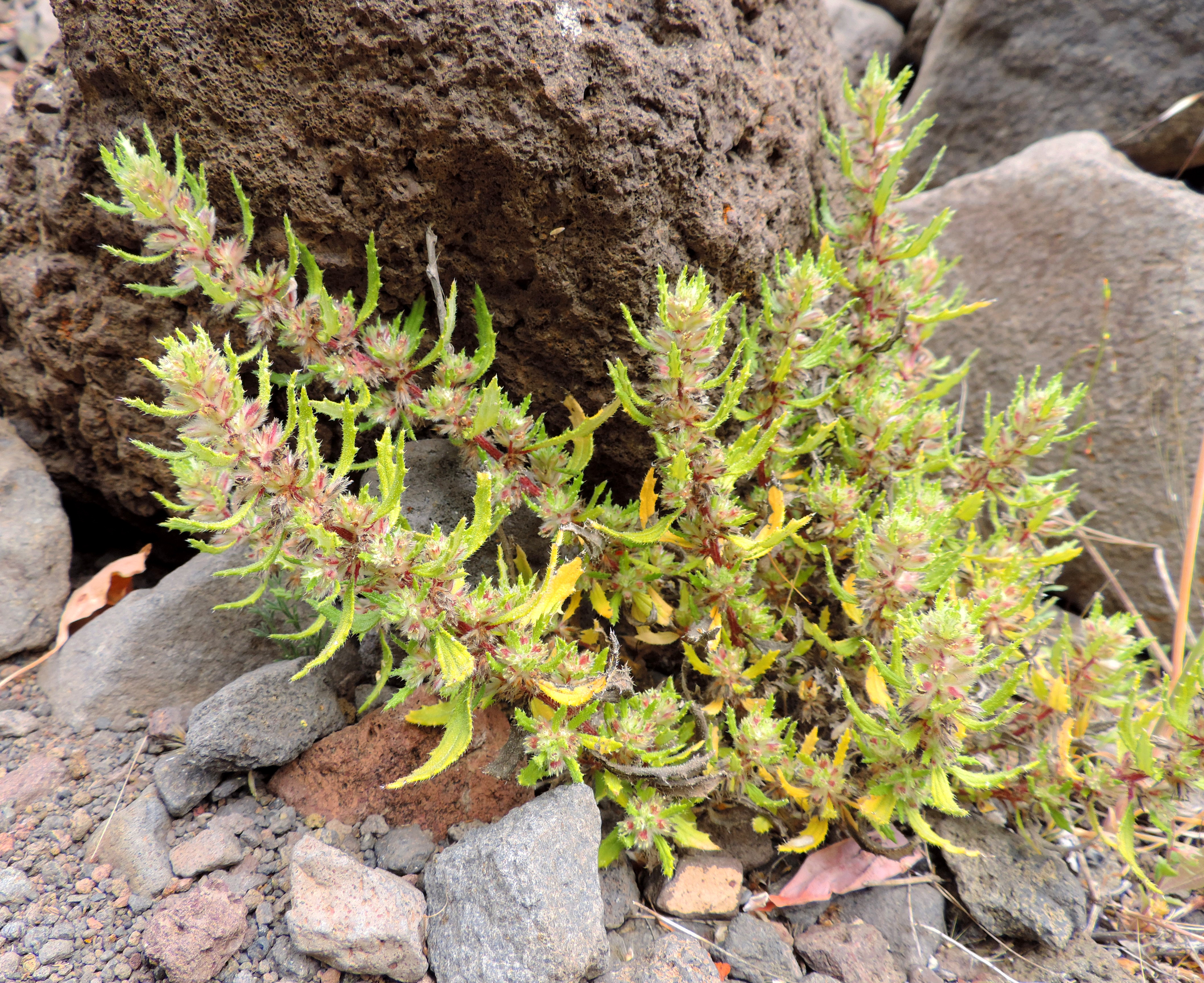
- Forsskaolea angustifolia

Scientific classification
- Kingdom: Plantae
- Clade: Tracheophytes
- Clade: Angiosperms
- Clade: Eudicots
- Clade: Rosids
- Order: Rosales
- Family: Urticaceae
- Genus: Forsskaolea; L.

Species
- See text.

Synonyms
- Chamaedryfolia Dill. Caidbeja Forssk. Forsskalea

= Forsskaolea =

Genus of flowering plants

Forsskaolea is a small genus of 7 species of perennial herbs in the nettle family with non-stinging hairs and dot-like concretions of mineral matter on their green parts. The genus was named in honor of Swedish botanist Peter Forsskål.

== Description ==
Leaves
The leaves have three ribs, are alternate, scalloped and with toothlike projections along the edges.
Flowers
Budding flowers are flat-topped clusters and bisexual and from the base stem, enclosed in bell shaped, densely hairy, rings of 3-6 bracts. Flowers are minute and unisexual with the female surrounded by a ring of male flowers. Male flowers have 3-5 lobed calyx and the females have none. Solitary stamen, upright wooly ovaries with no style.
Seeds
Achenes oval to elliptical, flattened, densely hairy and enveloped in wooly bracts.

== Distribution ==
Forsskaolea have found homes in the southern parts of the Palearctic from the Canary Isles and southeast Spain then eastwards to Pakistan and western India.

== Species ==
Species accepted by the Plants of the World Online as of December 2022:

- Forsskaolea angustifolia Retz.
- Forsskaolea candida L.f.
- Forsskaolea griersonii A.G.Mill. & J.A.Nyberg
- Forsskaolea hereroensis Schinz
- Forsskaolea procridifolia Webb
- Forsskaolea tenacissima L.
- Forsskaolea viridis Ehrenb. ex Webb
