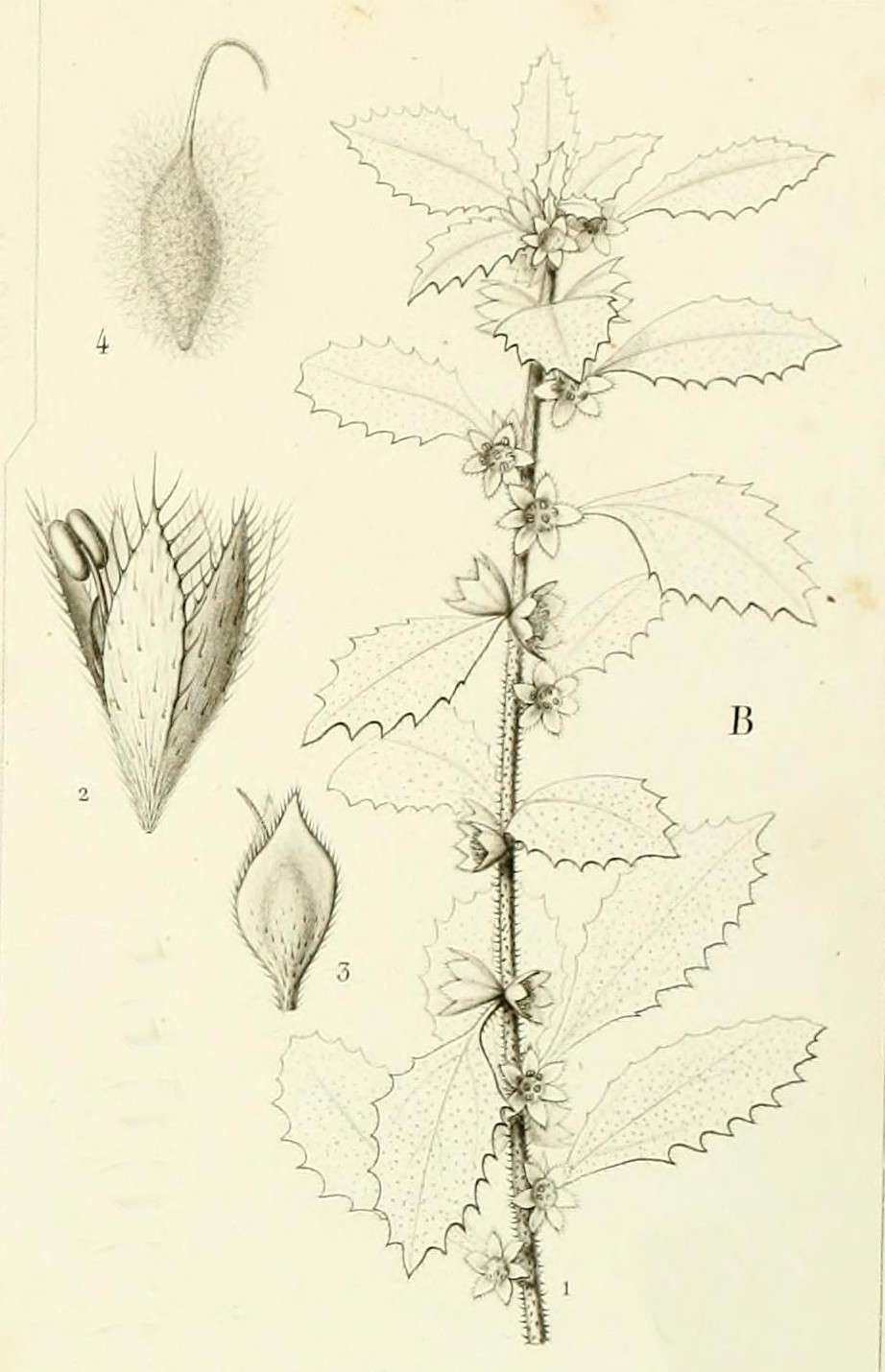

Conservation status
- Near Threatened (IUCN 3.1)

Scientific classification
- Kingdom: Plantae
- Clade: Tracheophytes
- Clade: Angiosperms
- Clade: Eudicots
- Clade: Rosids
- Order: Rosales
- Family: Urticaceae
- Genus: Forsskaolea
- Species: F. procridifolia

Binomial name
- Forsskaolea procridifolia Webb

Synonyms
- Forsskaolea procridifolia var. microphylla J.A.Schmidt

= Forsskaolea procridifolia =

Species of flowering plant

Forsskaolea procridifolia is a species of flowering plants of the family Urticaceae. The species is endemic to Cape Verde. It is listed as near threatened by the IUCN.

The species occurs in most of the islands of Cape Verde, except Boa Vista. It is found from sea level up to 1,700 metres elevation.
