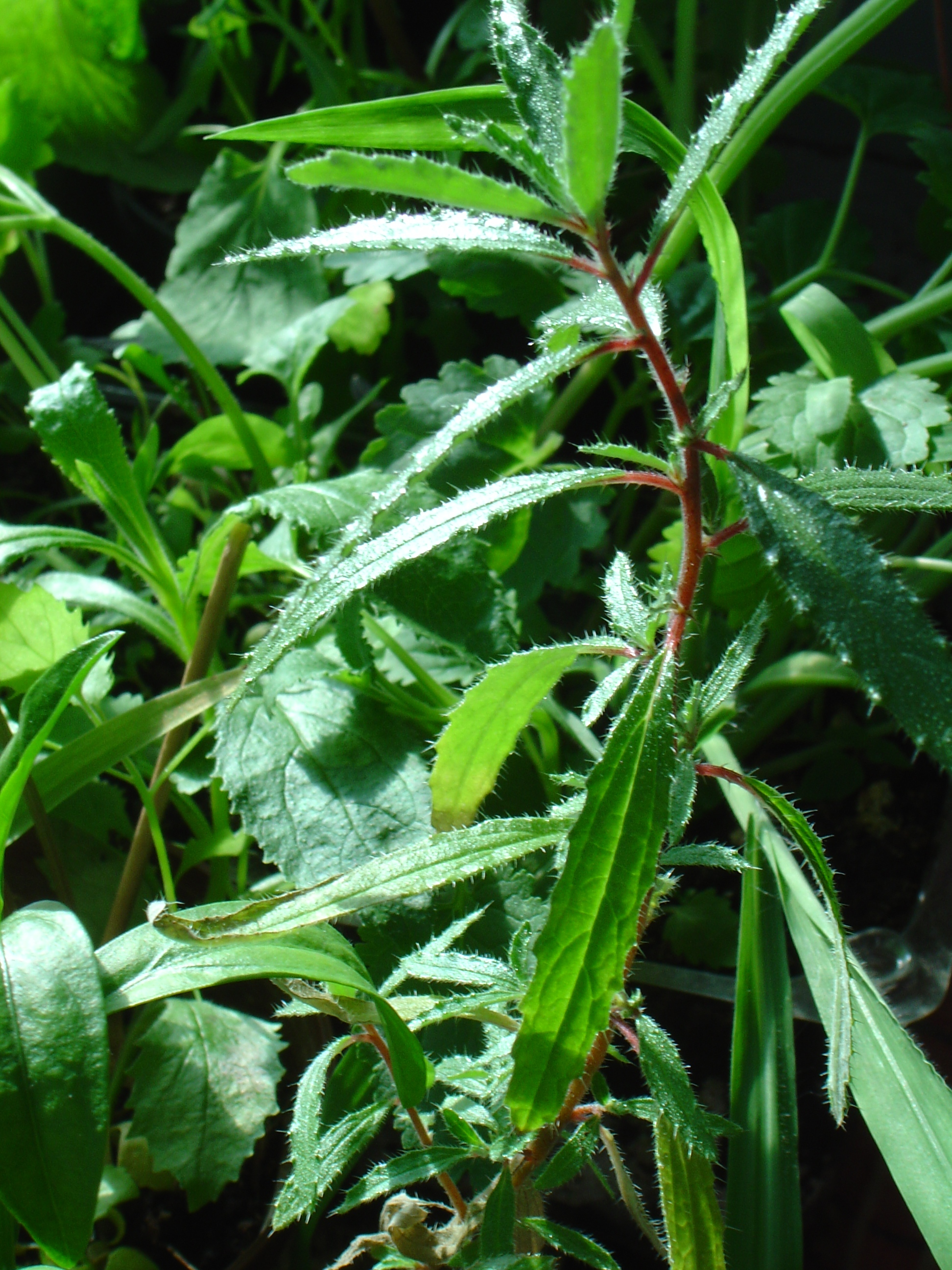

Scientific classification
- Kingdom: Plantae
- Clade: Tracheophytes
- Clade: Angiosperms
- Clade: Eudicots
- Clade: Rosids
- Order: Rosales
- Family: Urticaceae
- Genus: Forsskaolea
- Species: F. angustifolia

Binomial name
- Forsskaolea angustifolia Retz.

= Forsskaolea angustifolia =

Species of flowering plant

Forsskaolea angustifolia is a small shrub or perennial herb. The leaves of the plant are alternate, with dentate, prickly margins, and is densely lanate beneath, with stipules present. Its flowers are monoecious. Its inflorescences are axillary, small, and pinkish, and male flowers have one stamen.

== Distribution ==
It is found in all of the Canary Islands where it is common in the dry areas of the lower zone.
