= Coast of Slaves =

Book by Thorkild Hansen

- First edition
- Author: Thorkild Hansen
- Original title: Slavernes kyst
- Language: Danish
- Published: 1967
- Publisher: Gyldendal
- Publication place: Denmark
- Awards: Nordic Council's Literature Prize of 1971
- Followed by: Ships of Slaves

Coast of Slaves (Danish: Slavernes kyst) is a 1967 novel by Danish author Thorkild Hansen. It won the Nordic Council's Literature Prize in 1971.
