= Fort Fredensborg =

Ghanaian fort

- Part of Danish Gold Coast
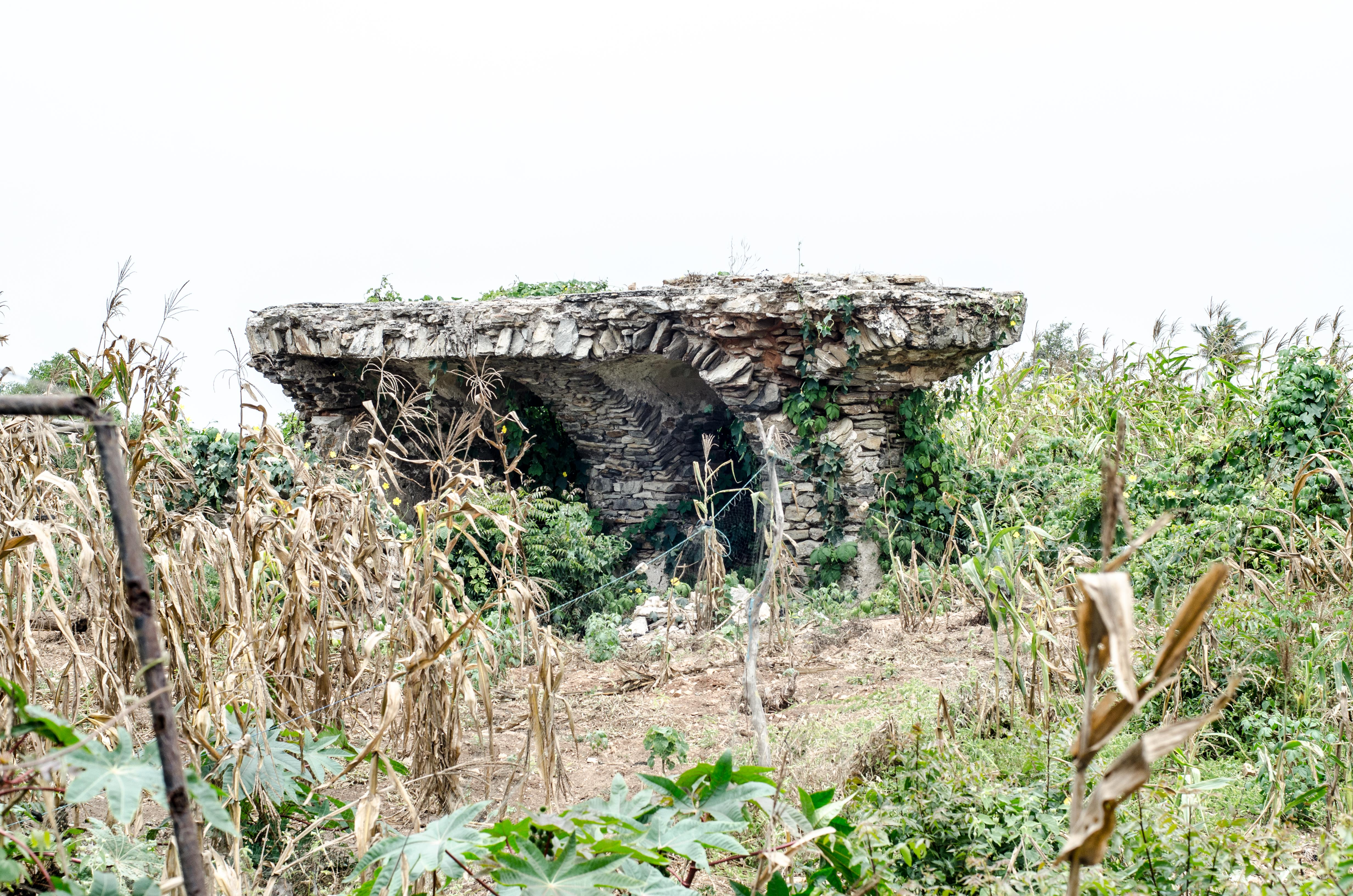
- Fort Fredensborg

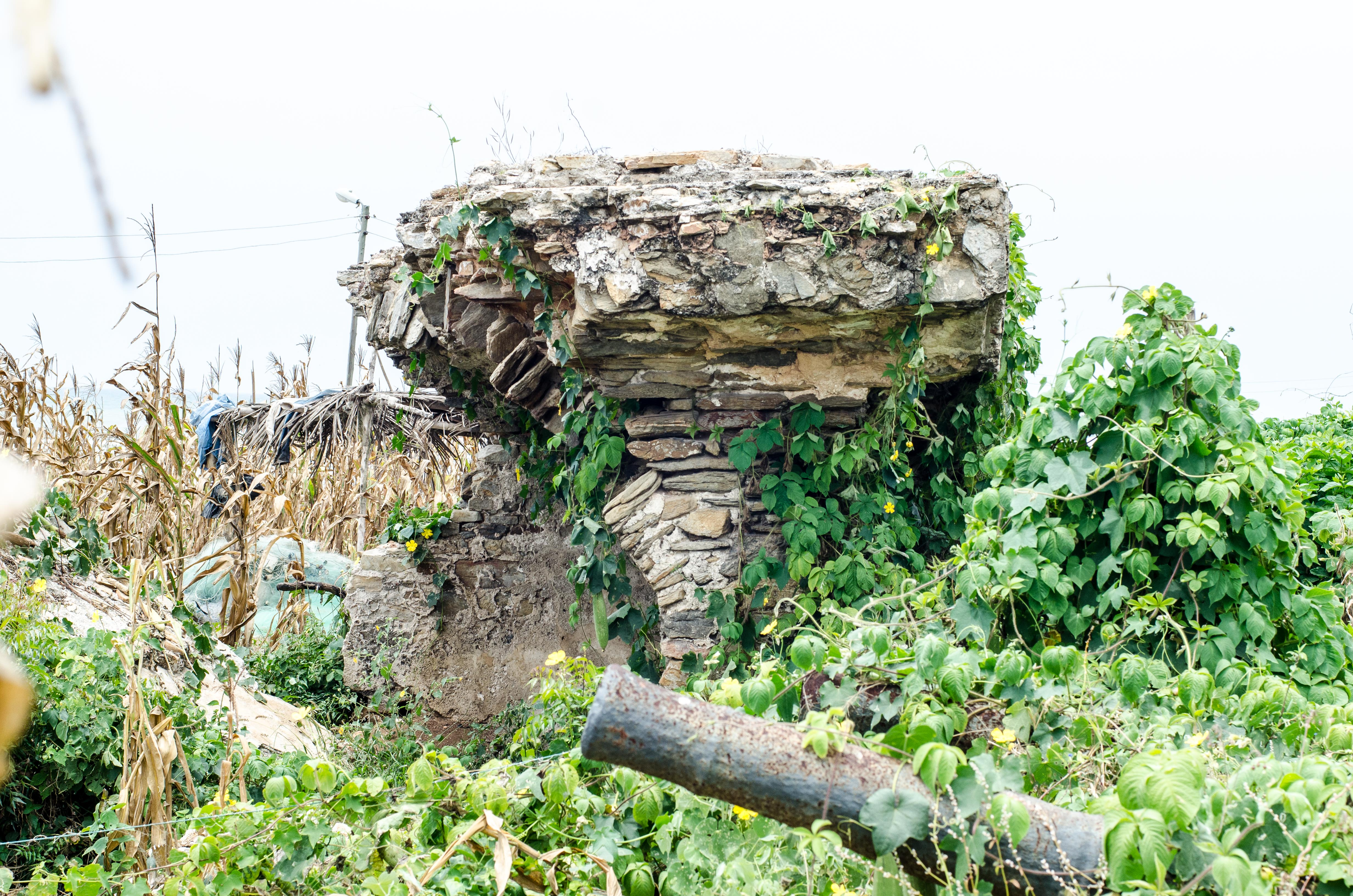
- Ruins of Fort Fredensborg

Location
- Coordinates: 5°44′41″N 0°11′00″E

Site history
- Built: 1734

Garrison information
- Occupants: Denmark (1734-1835); England (1850)

Fort Fredensborg is situated along the Gulf of Guinea, in the Greater Accra Region in Old Ningo and was built in 1734. Because of its testimony to the Atlantic slave trade and the European colonial influence on West Africa, the fort was inscribed on the UNESCO World Heritage List in 1979, along with several castles and forts in Ghana.

== History ==
The Danish-Norwegian fort was once used as a slave trading station. However, with the abolition of the slave trade, it soon decayed such that by 1835 only one man was stationed in the fort ‘to maintain the flag’.

Fredensborg was already in a state of ruin when it was handed over to the British on 8 March 1850, along with other Danish possessions.

== See also ==
- Fredensborg (slave ship)
- Fredensborg
