= Købmagergade 5 =

Building in Copenhagen, Denmark

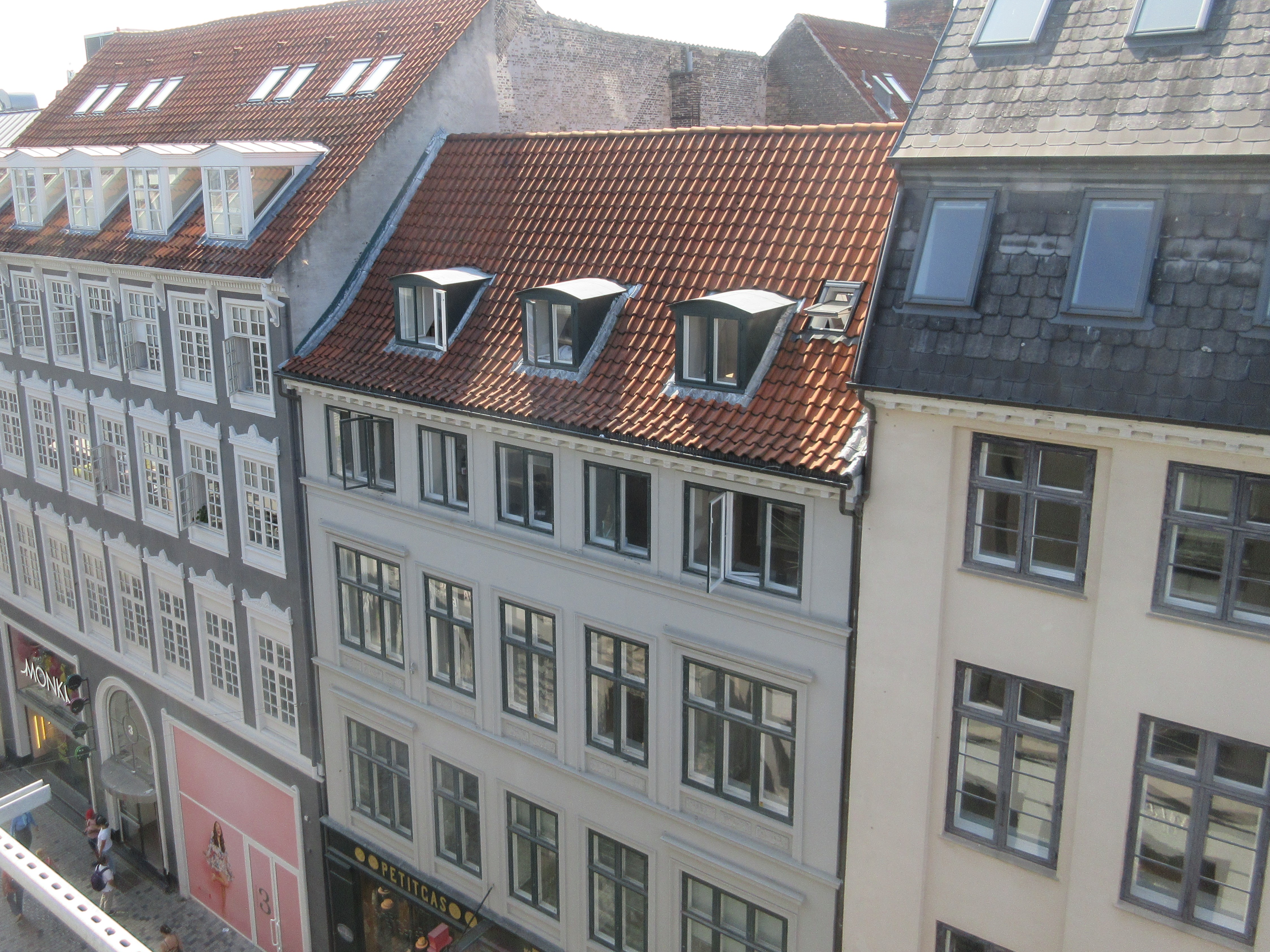

General information
- Location: Copenhagen, Denmark
- Coordinates: 55°40′45.75″N 12°34′45.55″E
- Completed: 1820
- Renovated: 180+s (heightened)

Købmagergade 5 is a 17th-century property situated on the shopping street Købmagergade, close to Amagertorv and Strøget, in central Copenhagen, Denmark. Constructed as part of the rebuilding of the city following the Copenhagen Fire of 1728 it was later heightened with one storey. The building was listed in the Danish registry of protected buildings and places in 1971. Petitgas Eftf., for many years Denmark's oldest hats store, occupied the ground floor from 1857 until 2020.

== History ==
=== Early history ===
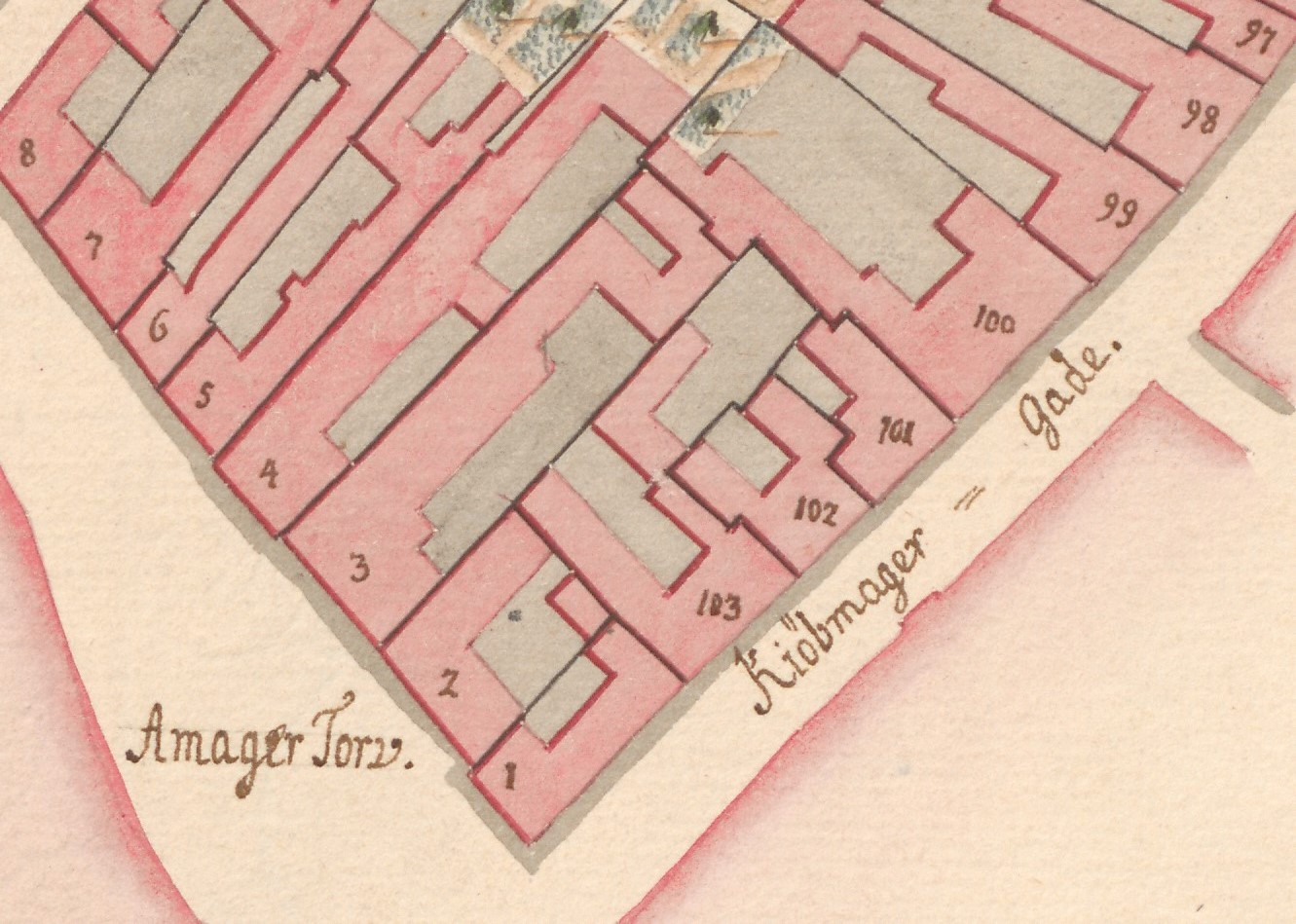
No. 102 seen on a detail from Christian Gedde's map of Frimand's Quarter.

The property was listed in Copenhagen's first cadastre of 1689 as No. 116 in Frimand's Quarter and was at that time owned by sword-maker (sværdfeger) Ludvig Villumsen. The building, together with most of the other properties in the area, was destroyed in the Copenhagen Fire of 1728. The current building on the site was constructed in 1729 for Druse Saltou, widow of merchant (kræmmer) Johan Køster. It was listed as No. 102 in the new cadastre of 1756 and was at that time owned by merchant (kræmmer) Magnus Molman.

The property was home to 12 residents in two households at the 1787 census. Daniel Symons, a Jewish merchant, resided in the building with his wife Clare Meyer Jerocham, Jerochams Symons, their four children (aged eight to 14) and one maid. Mathias With, another Jewish merchant, resided in the building with his an office clerk, two apprentices and one maid.

The building was heightened with an extra floor in the 1790s.

The property was home to 22 residents in three households at the 1801 census. Johan Jørgen Jessen, a silk and textile merchant, resided in the building with his wife Susanne Sophie Wilken, a housekeeper (husjomfru), an employee, an apprentice, a caretaker and a maid. Isak Larpent, a merchant, resided in the building with his wife Susanne Sophie Schneider, their two sons (aged two and three) and three maid. Christian Carl Lous, a prefessor of mathematics, and navigation director, resided in the building with four of his children (aiged eight to 21), a housekeeper and two maids. Isaac Larpent was the youngest son of a clockmaker by the samen name. His father had started a clock factory in Roskilde in partnership with Jürgen Jürgensen in 1773, trading as called Larpent & Jürgensen. He died on 6 July 1788.

Composer and organist at the Church of Our Saviour Hardenack Otto Conrad Zinck lived in the building in 1802-03.

The property was listed in the new cadastre of 1806 as No. 69 in Frimand's Quarter. It was by then owned by fire chief Brandemann's heirs.

Joseph Hambro lived in the building from 1809 to 1821, operating a galanterie shop (gift shop) in the ground floor.

=== Saul and Alfred Meyer ===
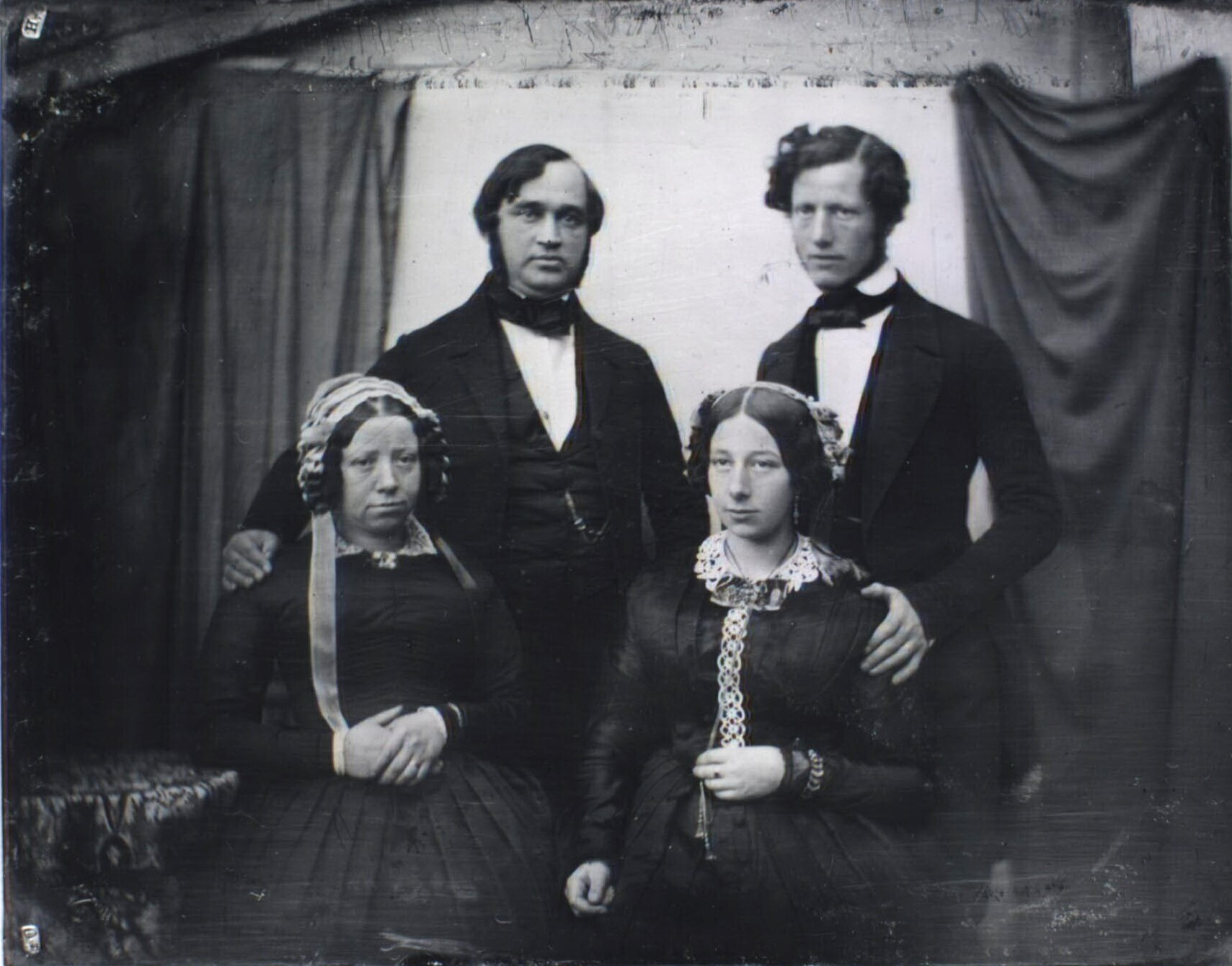
Alfred J. Meyer with family.

The property was home to 34 residents at the time of the 1840 census. Saul Meyer, a merchant (grosserer), resided on the second floor with his wife Frederikke Meyer, their three children (aged one to nine), the wife's unmarried sister Bolette Texiere and two maids. Alfred J.Meyer, a silk and textile merchant, resided on the first floor with his wife Sophie Meyer, their three children (aged one to five), a 10-year-old stepson, an employee and three maids. Elise Marie Petersen, a widow with a pension, resided on the third floor with three unmarried daughters (aged 20 to 32), a lodger (pharmacist) and a maid. Hans Hansen, a dyer, resided on the ground floor with his son Rasmus Christian Hansen, en employee (dyer) and a maid. Johan Gotfred Grund, a master basketmaker, resided in the basement with his 72-year-old widowed mother, two apprentices and one maid.

The property was home to 37 residents at the 1845 census. Alfred and Sophie Meuer were now residing on the first floor with eight children (aged one to 15), an apprentice, one male servant and four maids. Saul and Frederikke Meyer resided on the second floor with their three children (aged 19 to 14) and two maids. Celine Bendixen, a 60-year-old Jewish widow with means, resided on the third floor with her 28-year-old daughter Rose Bendixen (scgoolmistress), her 25-year-old daughter Serine Bendixen, the 25-year-old teacher Eva Jacobsen, the nine-year old girl Lene Eibeschutz (daughter of jurist Eibeschutz) and two maids. Levin Cosman Levysohn, a silk and textile merchant, resided on the ground floor with his younger sisters Hanne and Rebekka Levysohn and two maids. Anton Fredik Larsen, a master shoemaker, resided in the basement with his wife Grethe Larsen.

The property was home to 35 residents in four households at the 1850 census. The ground floor and second floor were now both occupied by Levy Cosm Levysohn. He lived there with his wife, two of their children, a housekeeper (hysjomfru) and two maids. Alfred and Sophie Meyer were still residing on the first floor with their large family and staff (16 people in total). Christian Broe, a flour and oats retailer, resided on the third floor and in part of the basement with his wife Marie Broe, their 24-year-old daughter Emilie and three servants. Johan Kilem, a plumber, resided in the basement with his wife Wilhelmine (née Kliem) and their four children (aged 16 to 29).

=== Petitgas Eftf. ===
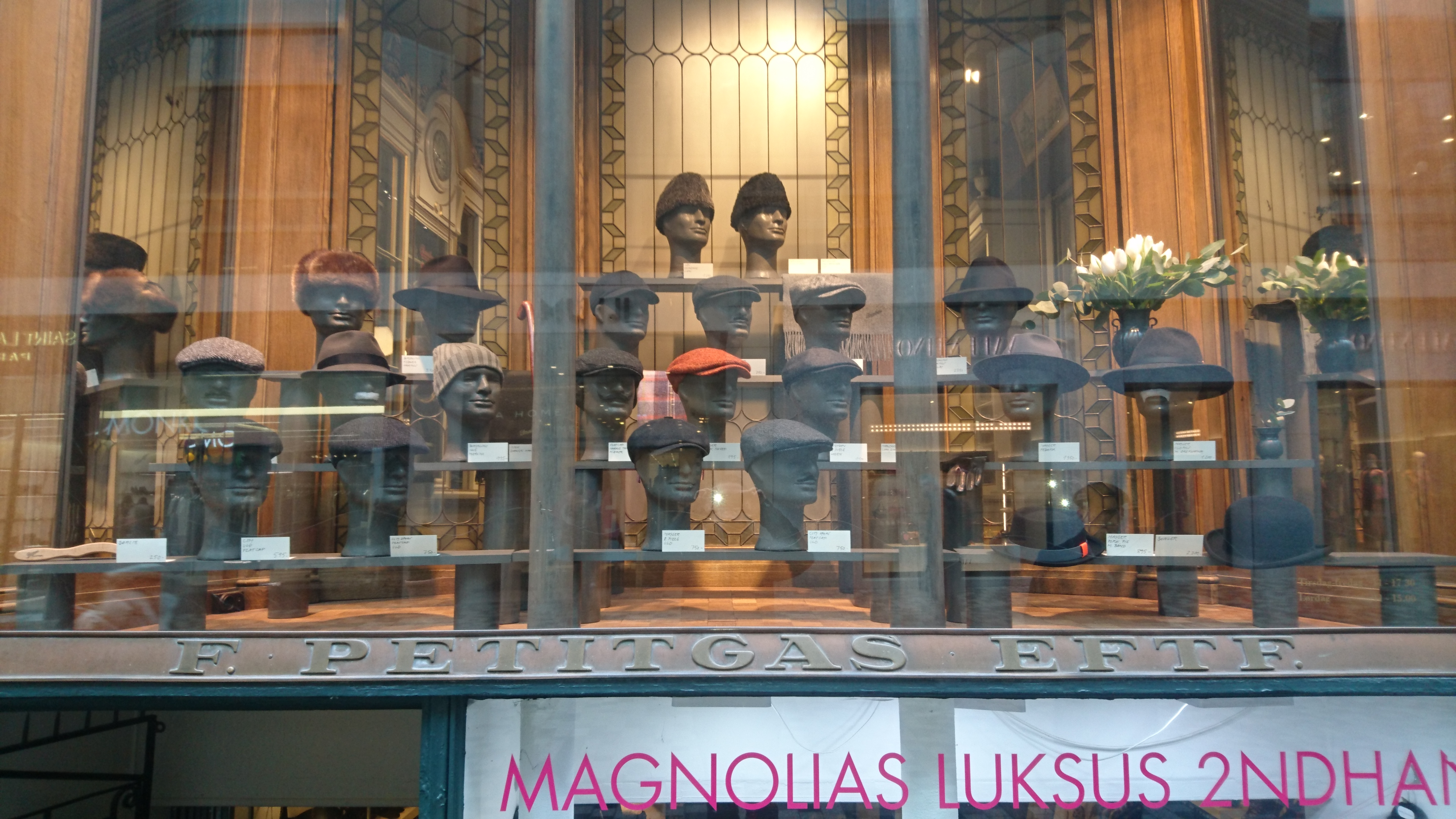
Petitgas

François Petitgas, a young French master hatter, purchased the building in circa 1857, opening a fancy new hat store on the ground floor on 23 April that same year. His property was home to 23 residents in four households at the 1860 census. Francois Petitgas resided on the ground floor with his housekeeper and two apprentices. Loius Helmuth, a master basketmaker, resided in another apartment with his wife Caroline f. Thønnesen, their two children (aged two and four) and an apprentice. Levin Levissohn, a silk and textile merchant, resided in a third apartment with his wife Bertha Levissohn, their four children (aged two to 10), his sister Johanne Levissohn, two female floor clerks, a maid, a wet nurse and a female cook. Maria Broe, a flour and oats retailer, resided in the basement with her 30-year-old unmarried daughter Emilia Broe.

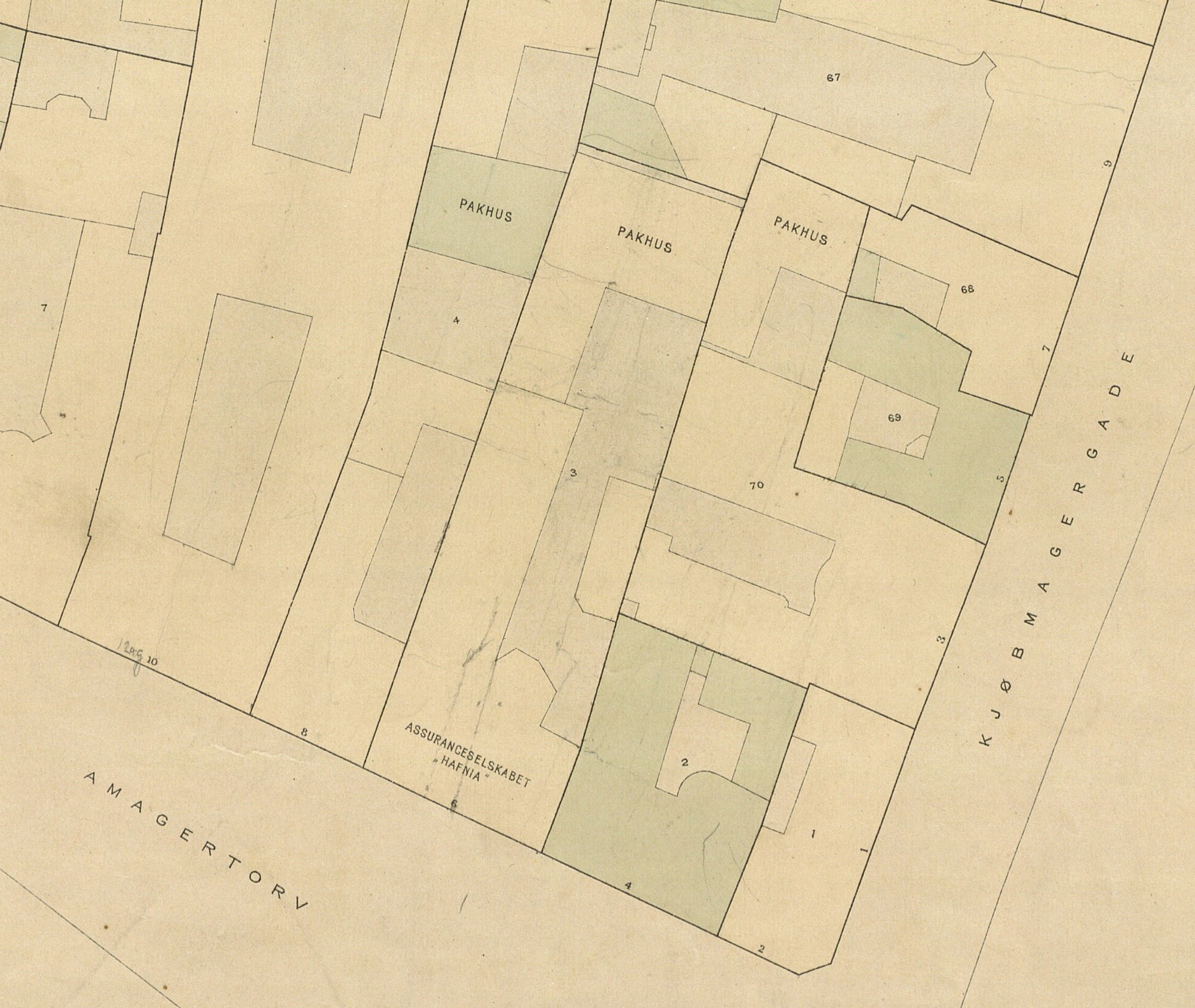
The property seen in a detail from one of Berggreen's block plans of Frimand's Quarter, 1886-88.

Up to 40 hatters were occupied with hat making in the rear wing in the 1880s. The shop window was installed in conjunction with a renovation of the shop in 1892. Part of the interior, including a clock and the glazed ceiling also date from this time. Petitgas won a gold medal at the Exposition Universelle in Paris in 1900.

FrançoisPetitgas' widow and daughter continued the shop after his death in 1913. It passed out of the family when it was sold to Anton Rasmussen in 1024. It was after his death in 1960 continued by his son Frode Rasmussen and then from 1871 by his grandson Steen Rasmussen. Kurt P. Jensen, who was engaged as shop manager in 1994, purchased the company in 2002. Customers have included Frederick IV of Denmark, Olav V of Norway, Thorvald Stauning and Ob Schønberg.

== Gallery ==
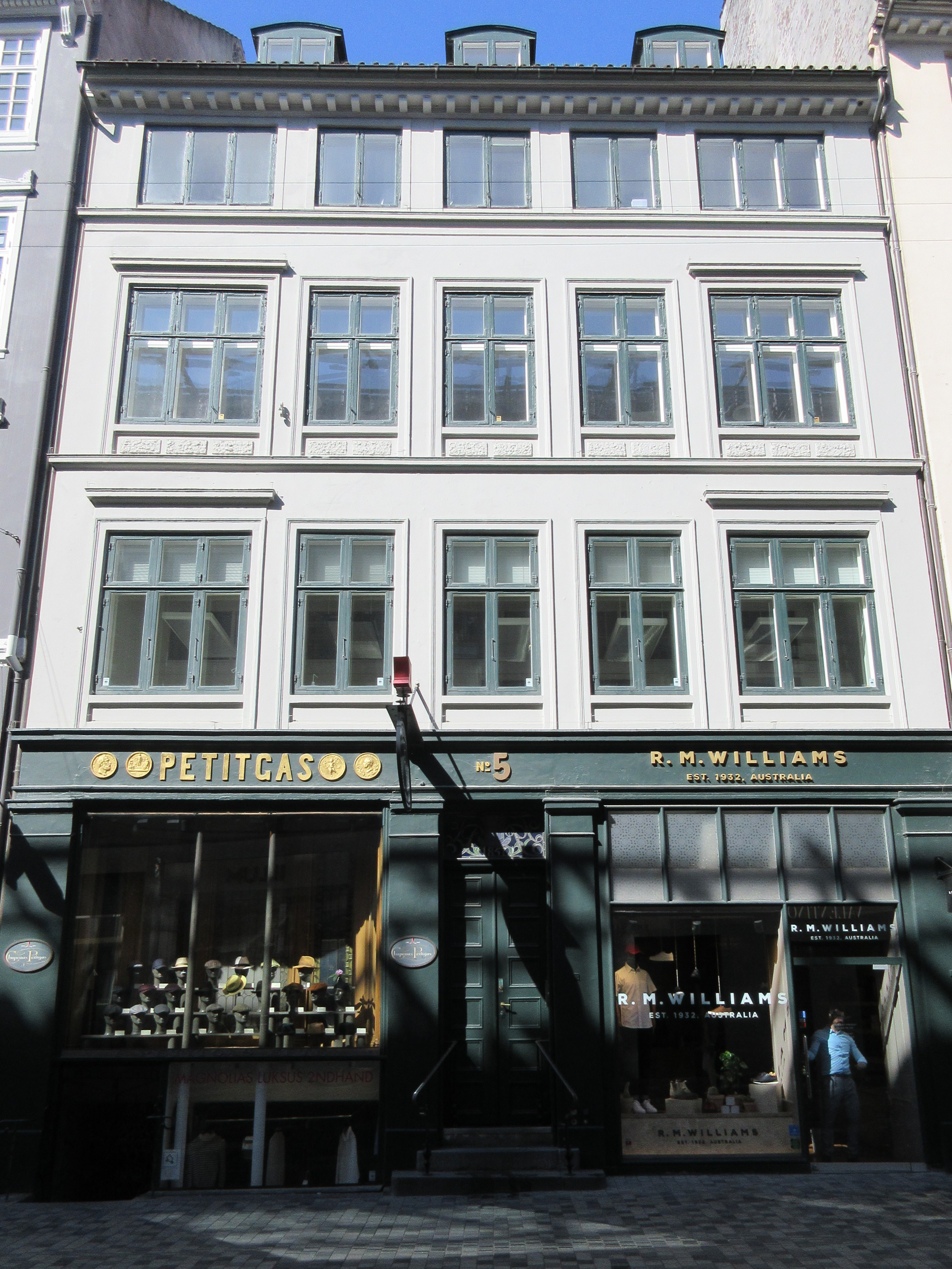
The facade in 2020

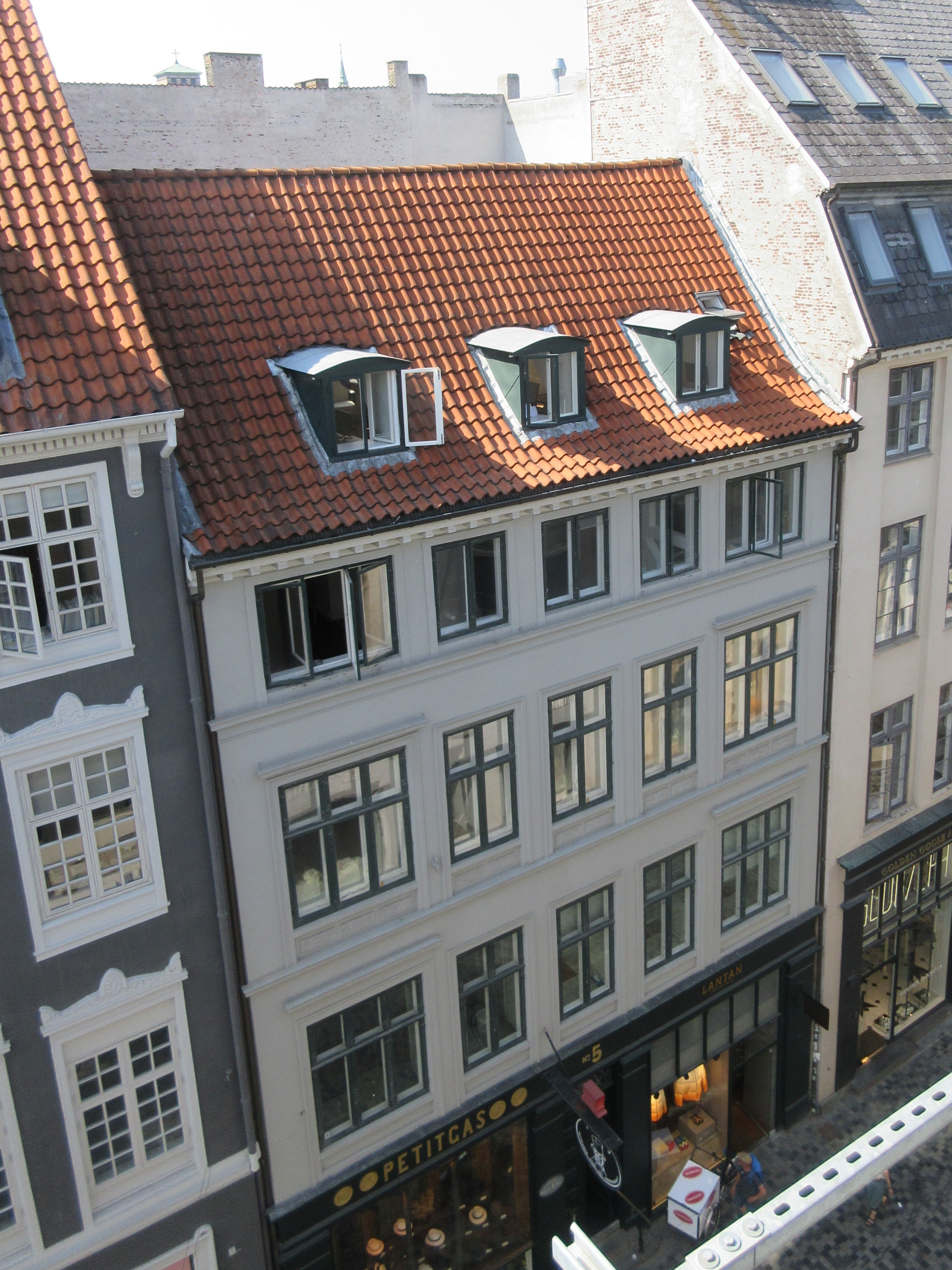
The facade in 2022

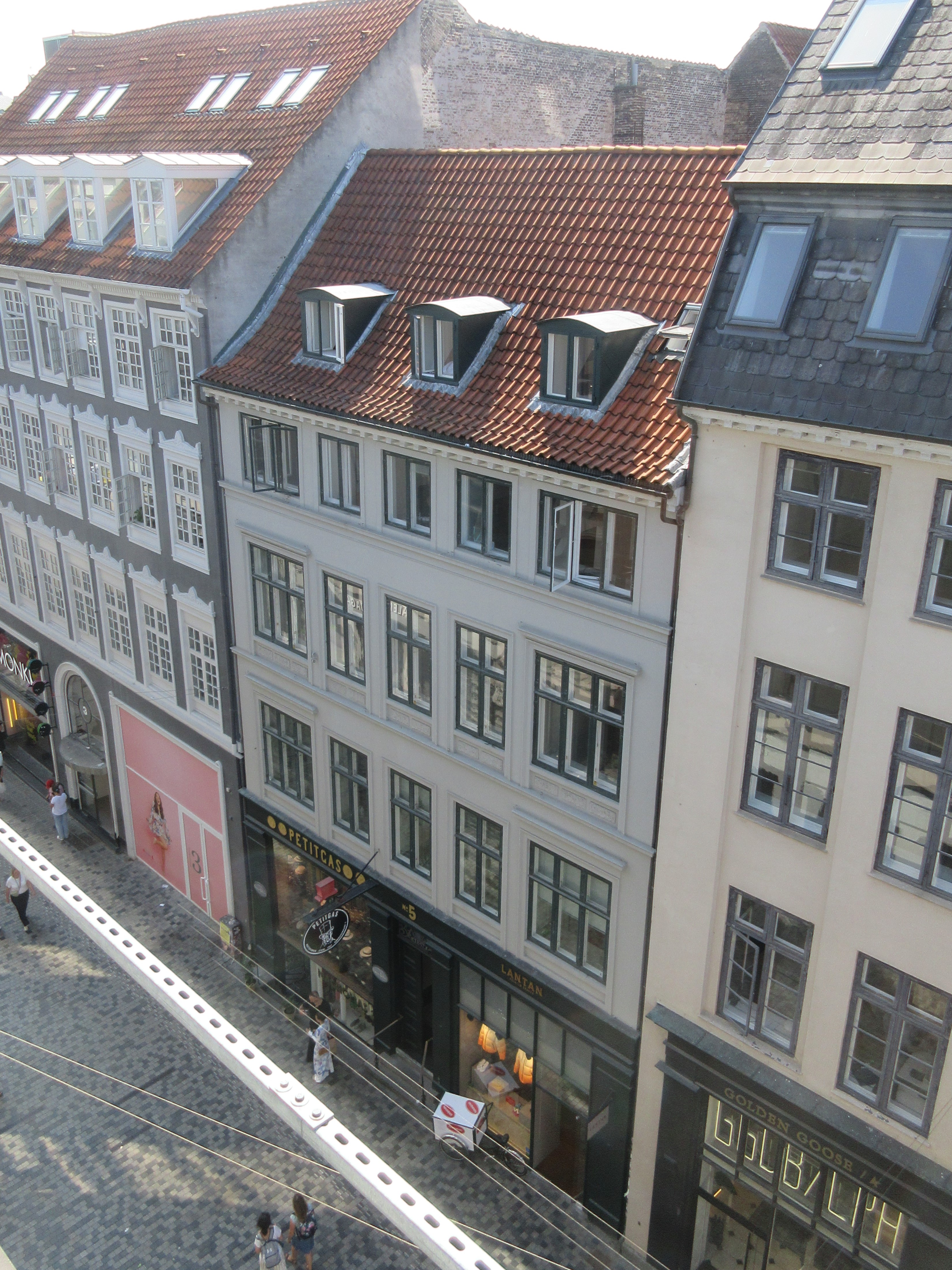

== See also ==
- Købmagergade 7
