= Islands of Slaves =

Book by Thorkild Hansen

- Hardcover edition
- Author: Thorkild Hansen
- Original title: Slavernes øer
- Language: Danish
- Genre: Fiction novel
- Published: 1970
- Publisher: Gyldendal
- Publication place: Denmark
- Media type: Print
- Awards: Nordic Council's Literature Prize of 1971
- Preceded by: Ships of Slaves

Islands of Slaves (Danish: Slavernes øer) is a 1970 novel by Danish author Thorkild Hansen. It won the Nordic Council's Literature Prize in 1971.
