= Købmagergade 7 =

Commercial building in Copenhagen, Denmark

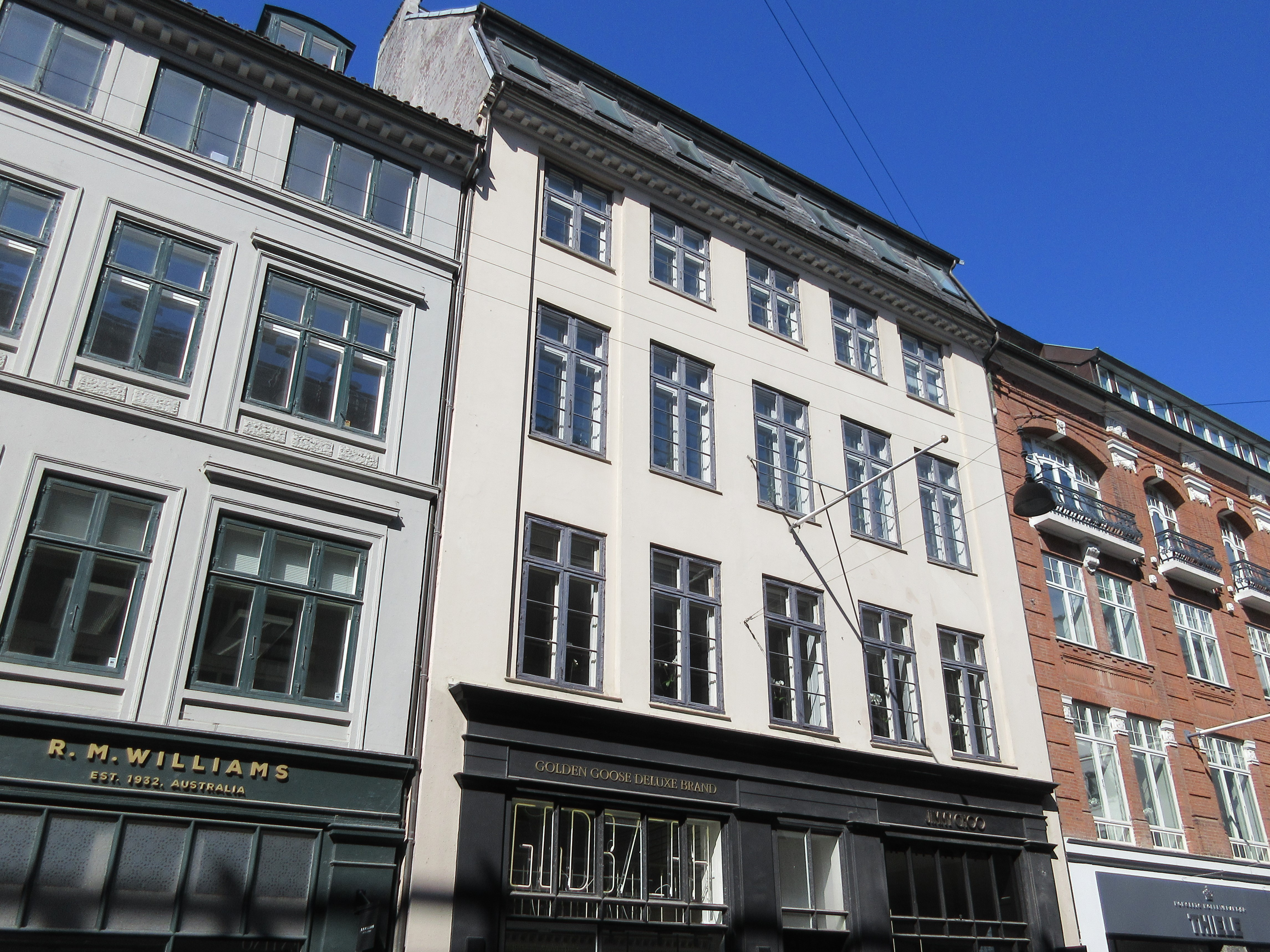
- Interactive map of the Købmagergade 7 area

General information
- Location: Copenhagen, Denmark
- Coordinates: 55°40′46.08″N 12°34′45.25″E
- Completed: 1729
- Renovated: 1790s (heightened)

Design and construction
- Architect: Philip de Lange

Købmagergade 7 is a listed commercial property on the pedestrianized shopping street Købmagergade in Copenhagen, Denmark. It was listed in the Danish registry of protected buildings and places in 1973.

== History ==
=== Warly history ===
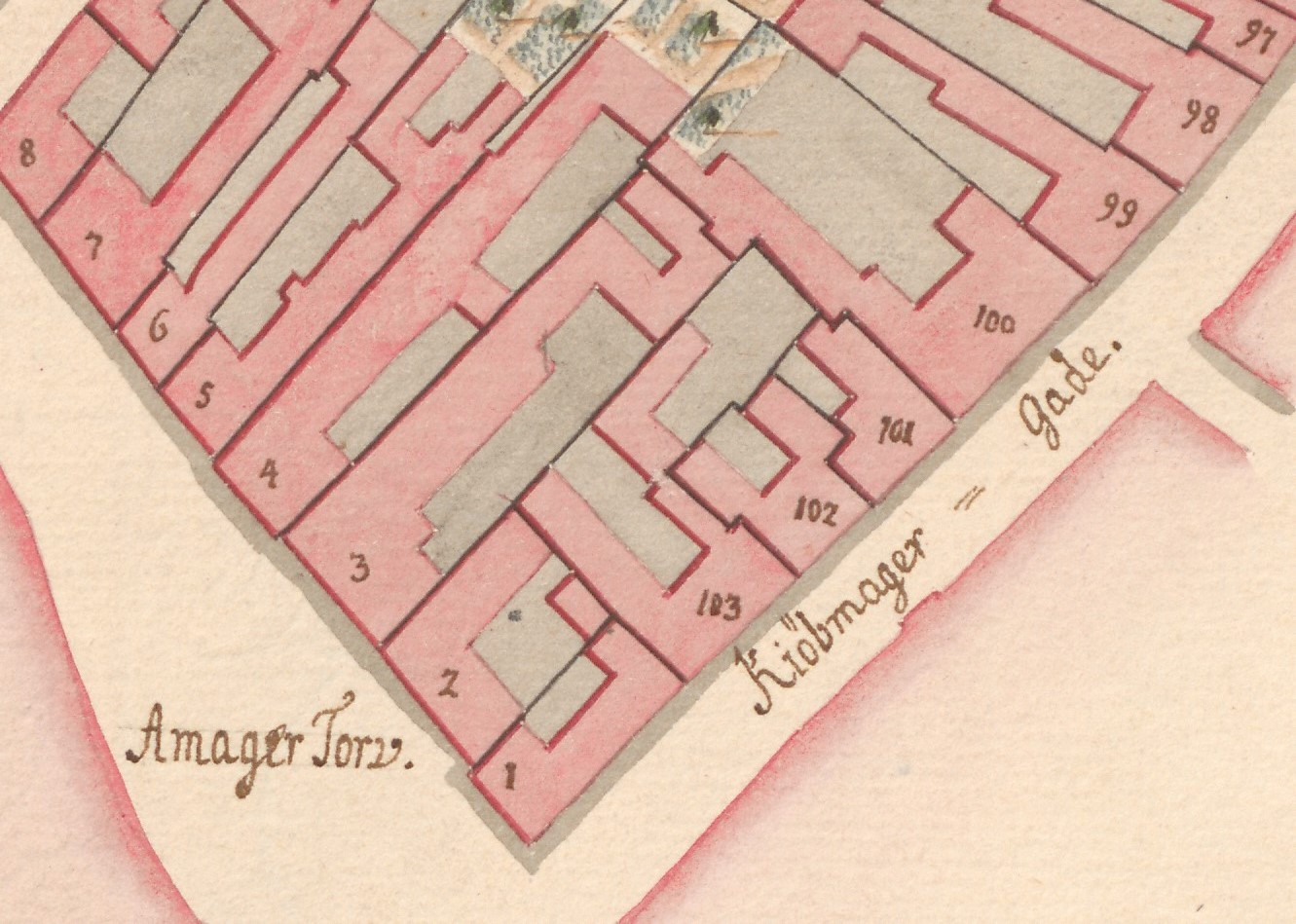
No. 101 seen on a detail from Christian Gedde's map of Frimand's Quarter.

The property was in the late 17th century part of two separate properties. One of them was listed in Copenhagen's first cadastre of 1689 as No. 114 in Frimand's Quarter and was at that time owned by Johan Gottfried Becker. The other one was listed as No. 115 and belonged to merchant (kræmmer) Lambert Mandel. The two properties, together with most of the other buildings in the area, were destroyed in the Copenhagen Fire of 1728 and subsequently merged into a single property. The current building on the site was constructed in 1729 by master mason Simon Sørensen, master carpenter J. Pedersen and master mason Philip de Lagne for ironmonger Oluf Hegelund. The property was listed in the new cadastre of 1756 as No. 101 and was at that time owned by merchant (kræmmer) Peder Wasserfald.

Peder Wasserfald's sons Johann Daniel Waloker and Peter Wasserfall owned the building at the time of the 1787 census. They lived there with two office clerks, two apprentices, a househeeper and a maid.

It was heightened with one floor in the 1790s.

Peter Wasserfall kept the building after he was married and became a member of Grosserer-Societetet. He lived in the building with his wife Tolerance Svane, their three children (aged three to seven), three office clerks, three servants and one maid.

=== Blankensteiner & Søn, 1801–1844 ===
The property was in the new cadastre of 1806 listed as No. 68. It was at that time owned by Johan Georg Blankensteiner. He had in 1791 opened a shop at the corner of Købmagergade and Østergade, It had relocated to what is now Købmagergade 8 in 1801. It specialized in artistic images, galantry items (gifts) and toys. From 1803 the assortment also comprised nautical charts and devices. By 1806 J.G. Blankensteiner was listed as the owner of the building.

In Mit Livs Eventyr, Hans Christian Andersen mentions buying a puppet theatre there sometime between 1819 and 1822. He used it for entertaining the Dahlén family in their home at Badstuestræde 18 (then No. 124).

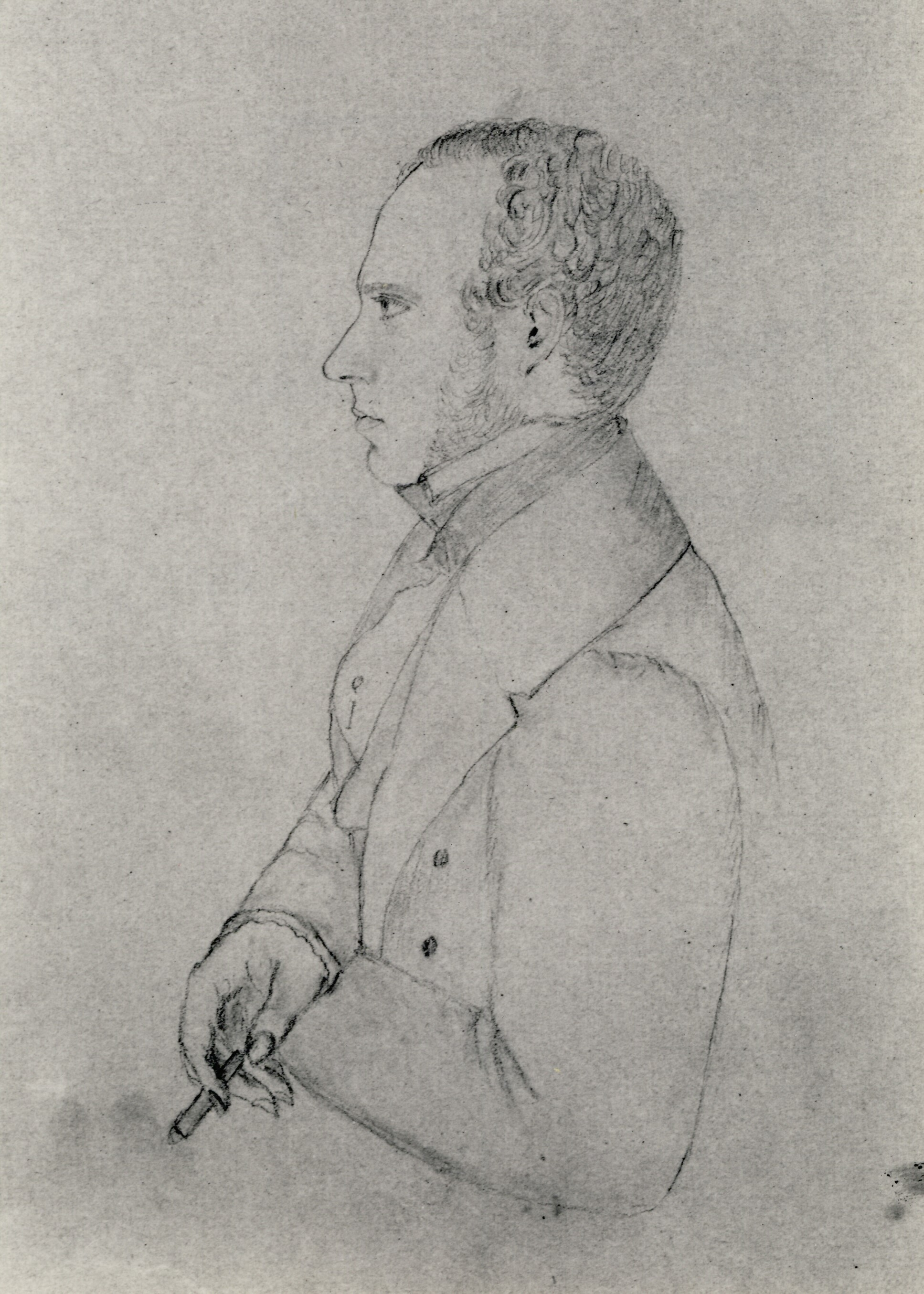
Portrait drawing of Frederik Wilhelm Blankensteiner created by H. A. Raupach on 2 April 1941 on Saint Croix in the Danish West Indies.

Carl August Blankensteiner, one of the founder's three sons, joined the company in the early 1830s. The name of the company was therefore changed to Blankensteiner & Søn. He continued it alone following his father's death in 1835. Both of his brothers joined the Danish Admiralty as volunteers. The Frederik Wilhelm Blankensteiner (1815–1862) served as ship's secretary onboard the frigate Rota when it was sent to Livorno in 1838 to pick up Bertel Thorvaldsen and some of his artworks. He would later also serve as provisions manager (Skibsproviantforvalter & Kahytsskriver) on the First Galathea Expedition from 1845 to 1847.

The property was home to 20 residents at the time of the 1840 census. The brothers Peter Anton Blankensheiner, Carl August Blankensheiner and Frederik Wilhelm Blankensheiner resided on the ground floor with an office clerk and a caretaker. Jens Peter Bentzen, a silk and textile merchant, also resided on the ground floor with an apprentice. Adolf Siegfred Holm, a court official (Kongl. Hofcasserer), resided on the first floor with his wife Cathrine Marie Hedevig Holm, their two sons (aged four and 10) and one maid. Edvard Ganriques, a merchant, resided on the second floor with his housekeeper. Jacobine Skanke, a 64-year-old widow, resided on the third floor with one maid. Elias Schouw, a fruit and game retailer, resided in the basement with his wife Ane Christine Schouw and two unmarried daughters (aged 34 and 39).

On 18 March 1844, the shop relocated to the corner of Amaliegade and Toldbodvej and from then on focused exclusively on nautical charts, books and devices.

=== N. F. Larsen, 1845–1875 ===
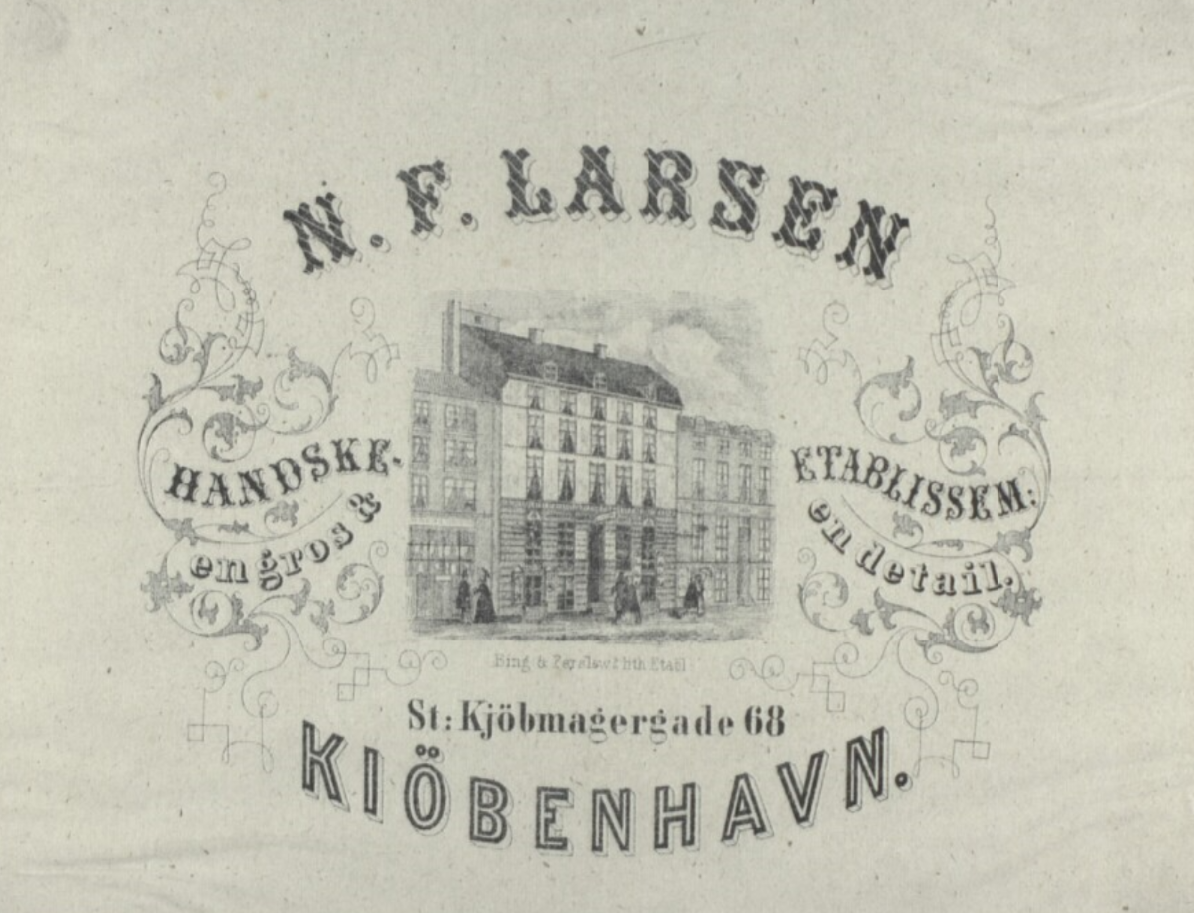
Advert for N. F. Larsen

The new owner of the property at Jøbmagergade No. 68 was glovemaker Niels Frederik Larsen. Larsen had founded his company on 1 April 1843. He lived in the building from 1871 until his death in 1881. The shop was continued by his family after his death. The company was then continued by his sons, Carl L. Larsen (born 1847) and Fr. J. Larsen (born 1854).

Niels Frederik Larsen's property was home to 23 residents at the 1845 census. Larsen resided on the first floor with his wife Henriette Larsen (née Bormann), two glovemakers, a tailor, an apprentice and a maid. Hermann Timke Stahl, a textile manufacturer (tøjmagermester), also resided on the first floor with his wife Hedvig Philipine Rose, a 13-year-old daughter, the wife's 45-year-old sister Louise Adolphine Rose and one maid. Carl August Blankensteiner was still resident on the first floor. He now lived there with an apprentice, master turner (drejermester) Jacob Bendron Petersen and two other turners. Christian Ipsen, Belgian consul, resided on the second floor with one maid. Wilhelmine Blankensteiner and Eleonora Gabriele Blankensteiner resided on the third floor. Surman Elsas, a Jewish porcelain retailer, resided in the basement with his sister L Elsas.

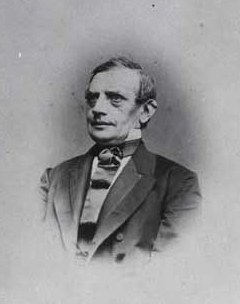
Niels Frederik Larsen

The property was home to 29 residents in four households at the 1850 census. N. F. Larsen and his wife resided on the third floor with their now five children (aged one to five), five glovemakers (employees, aged 20 to 26), four apprentices (aged 16 to 19), the 27-year-old man M. P. Christensen ("udskrevet efter septemberloven", 'discharged under the September Law') and one maid. A. C. B. Adler, a 31-year-old merchant (grosserer) resided on the second floor with his brother I. Adler (31, physician) and 67-year-old courier H. Tværskou. M. G. Anrich, a silk and textile merchant, resided on the first floor with his wife Louise Anrich, their 19-year-old daughter Mariane Geinst and one maid. The 34-year-old paper merchant W. E. Frölich (one household) resided on the ground floor with 45-year old embroidery retailer A. S. Petersen and her 37-year old sister M. A. Petersen.

The property was home to 29 residents in five households at the 1860 census (13 people in total). Isaac Adler, the Jewish community's physician, resided on the second floor with two lodgers. Carl Ludvig Larsen, a tailor, resided on the first floor with his wife Christine Marie Dorthea (née Nielsen), their two children (aged one to three), an apprentice and a maid. Joachim Anker Clausen, jeweler, resided on the ground floor with his wife Anna Christine née Lundberg, their three-year-old son and one maid. Ferdinand Reinsel Schultz, a turner, resided in the basement with his wife Ellen Fylla Jacobsen and an apprentice.

The company was converted into an aktieselskab and moved to Nørre Voldgade 38 in 1889. Two branches in Edinburgh and Newcastle upon Tyne opened in 1890. N. F. Larsen later returned to Købmagergade 7.

=== Later history ===
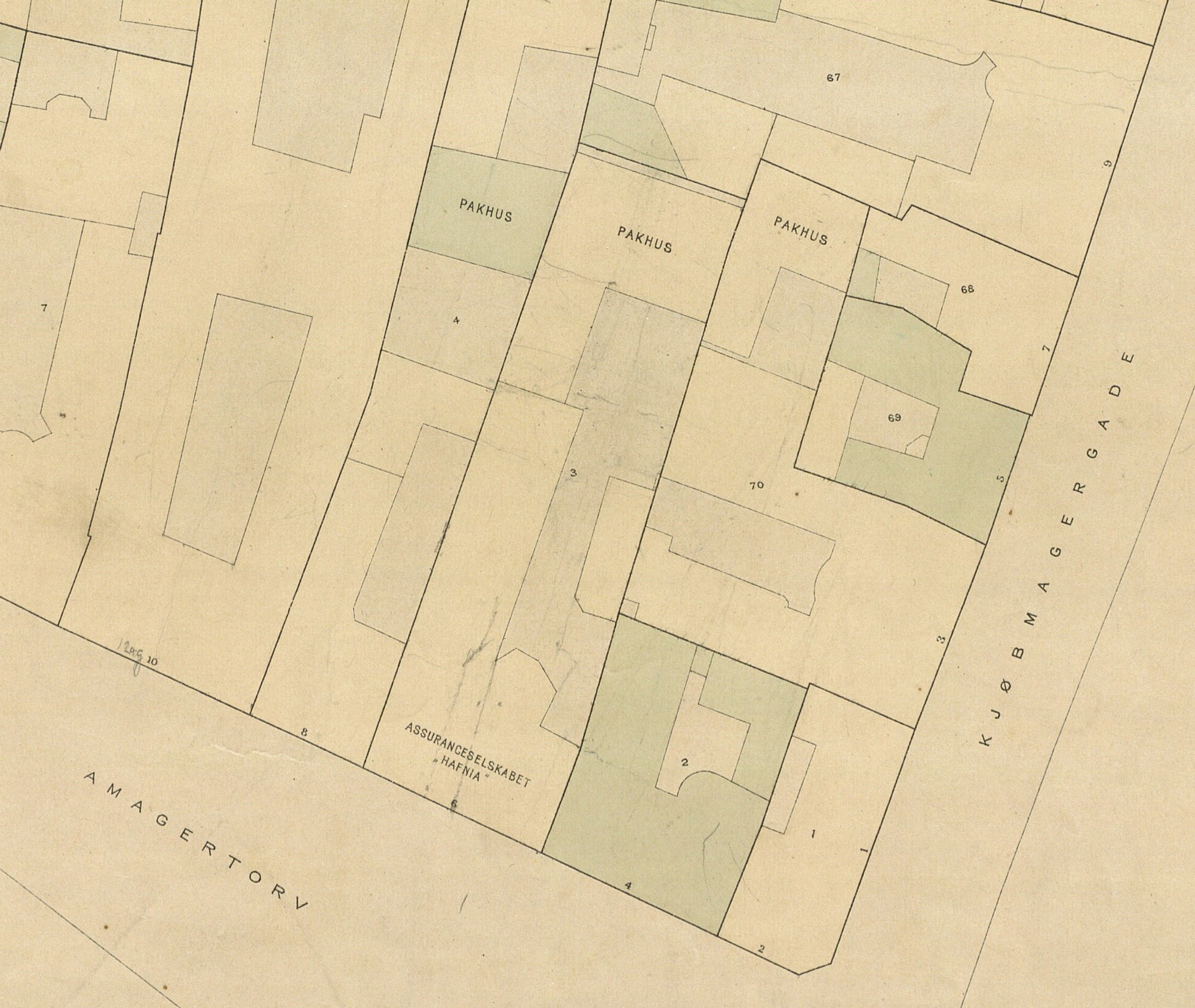
The property seen in a detail from one of Berggreen's block plans of Frimand's Quarter, 1886-88.

The Amdrup family, owner of Skindhuset, acquired N. F. Larsen in 1975. They closed the store but kept the building. The retail space was then taken over by royal florist Erik Berings. In 2017, the Amdrup family, sold the building to American property investor Hines.

== Today ==
In August 2018, it was announced that Jimmy Choo and Golden Goose Deluxe Brand will open two stores in the building.

== Gallery ==
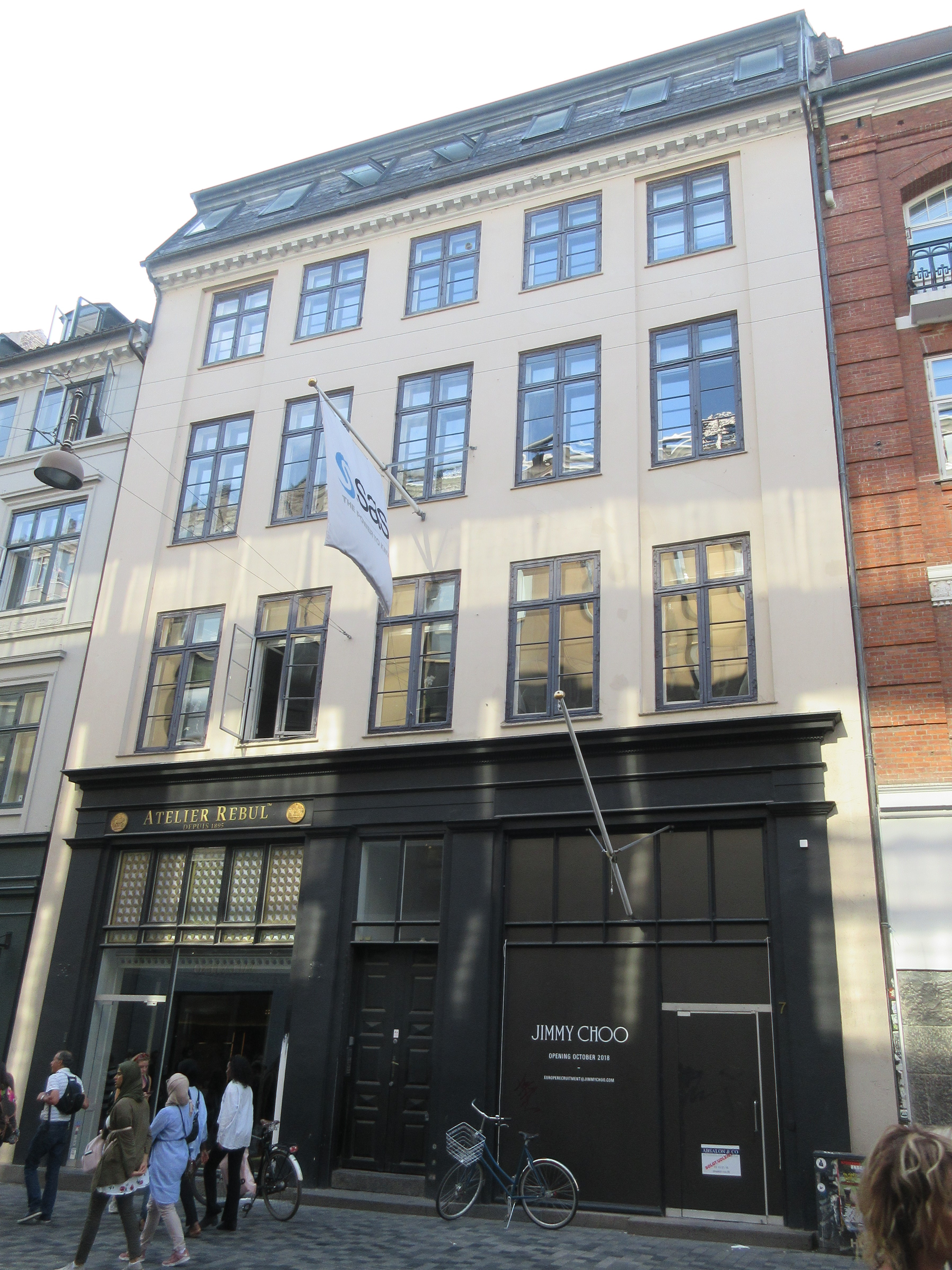
The building in 2018.

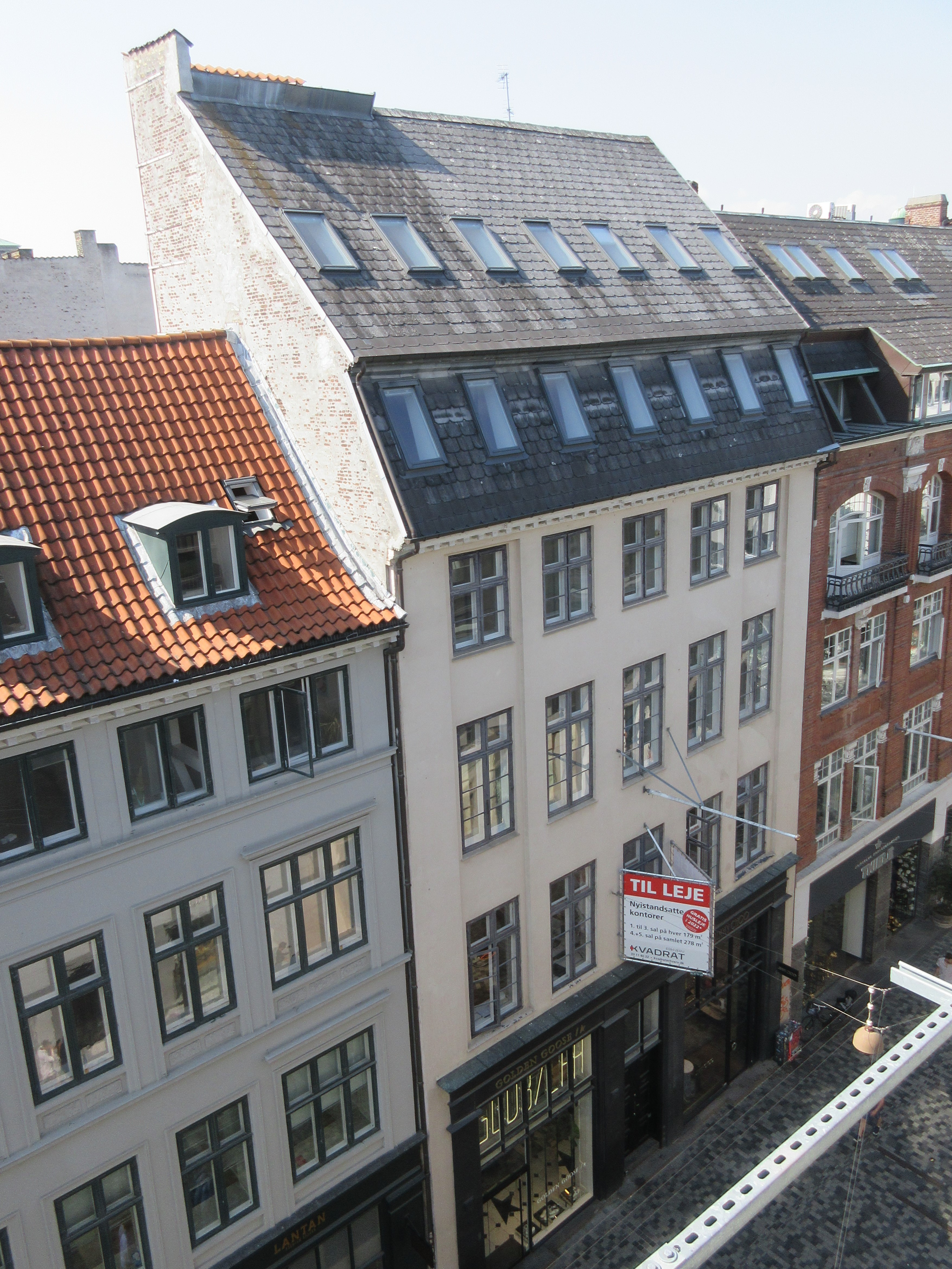
The building in 2022.

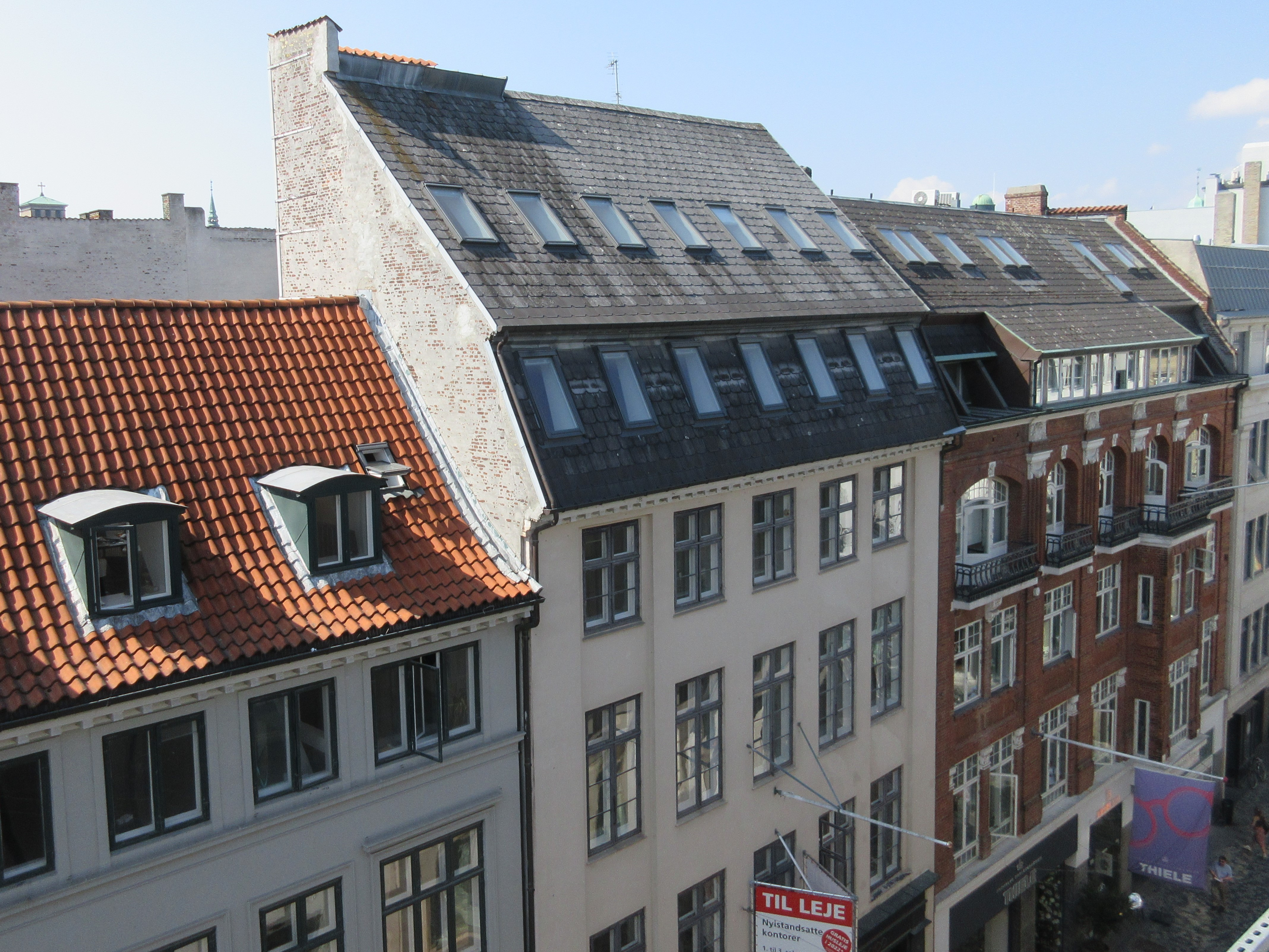

== See also ==
- Købmagergade 5
