= Ships of Slaves =

Book by Thorkild Hansen

- First edition
- Author: Thorkild Hansen
- Original title: Slavernes skibe
- Language: Danish
- Published: 1968
- Publisher: Gyldendal
- Publication place: Denmark
- Awards: Nordic Council's Literature Prize of 1971
- Preceded by: Coast of Slaves
- Followed by: Islands of Slaves

Ships of Slaves (Danish: Slavernes skibe) is a 1968 novel by Danish author Thorkild Hansen. It won the Nordic Council's Literature Prize in 1971.
