= Arabia Felix: The Danish Expedition of 1761–1767 =

1962 book by Thorkild Hansen

Arabia Felix
- Author: Thorkild Hansen
- Original title: Det lykkelige Arabien
- Translator: James McFarlane; Kathleen McFarlane
- Language: Danish
- Publisher: Gyldendal
- Publication date: 1962
- Publication place: Denmark
- English publication date: 1964
- Pages: 373

Arabia Felix: The Danish Expedition of 1761–1767 (Danish: Det lykkelige Arabien. En dansk ekspedition, 1761–67) is a 1962 book by the Danish writer Thorkild Hansen. It is about the Danish Arabia expedition of 1761–1767, when a diverse group of six people visited Arabia Felix, or current-day Yemen, with research about the historicity of the Old Testament as a primary goal. Hansen focused on the misfortunes of the expedition, of which only one member survived.

The book is based on the expedition members' journals, illustrations and correspondences, as well as contemporary reports and financial records. It is a hybrid of chronicle, history and fiction, which combines extensive quotations from the expedition members with Hansen's often sarcastic comments. It has been described as a documentary novel. The book was published in English translation by James and Kathleen McFarlane in 1964.

When Arabia Felix was republished in English in 2017, Colin Dwyer of the NPR wrote that "despite the humor, it's tough at times to avoid the book's kinship to drama — namely, ancient tragedy. Like an Oedipus Rex, we know the way this one ends already; after all, it can be tough to call it a spoiler if the ending already lives in a Wikipedia entry."
