= Thorkild Hansen =

Danish novelist (1927–1989)

Thorkild Hansen (9 January 1927 – 4 February 1989) was a Danish novelist most noted for his historical fiction. He is popularly known for his trilogy of novels about the Danish slave trade which is composed of Coast of Slaves (1967), Ships of Slaves (1968), and Islands of Slaves (1970; for which he received the Nordic Council Literature Prize in 1971).

== Biography ==
Hansen was born at Ordrup in Gentofte Municipality, Denmark. He attended Holte Gymnasium and from 1945–47 studied literature at the University of Copenhagen. In 1947, he moved to Paris where he wrote dispatches for the Copenhagen-based Ekstra Bladet. After returning to Denmark in 1952, he devoted his efforts to a series of novels. Several featured aspects of the Danish era of imperialism. Arabia Felix: The Danish Expedition of 1761–1767 (1962) covered the Danish Arabia expedition (1761–67), the members of which included Carsten Niebuhr. His book Jens Munk (1965) was about Danish-Norwegian sea captain Jens Munk and his attempt to locate the Northwest Passage.

He died prematurely during a voyage in the Caribbean.

== Awards ==
- Søren Gyldendal Prize (1963)
- De Gyldne Laurbær (1966)
- Nordic Council Literature Prize (1971)

== Selected works ==
- Resten er Stilhed (1953)
- Arabia Felix: The Danish Expedition of 1761–1767 (Det Lykkelige Arabien. En Dansk Ekspedition, 1761-67 , 1962)
- Coast of Slaves (Slavernes kyst, 1967)
- Ships of Slaves (Slavernes skibe, 1968)
- The Way to Hudson Bay: The Life and Times of Jens Munk
- Islands of Slaves (Slavernes øer, 1970)
- Processen mod Hamsun, (1978)
