= 1811 in Denmark =

- Decades: 1790s; 1800s; 1810s; 1820s; 1830s
- See also: Other events of 1811; List of years in Denmark

Events from the year 1811 in Denmark.

== Incumbents ==
- Monarch – Frederick VI
- Prime minister – Frederik Moltke

== Events ==
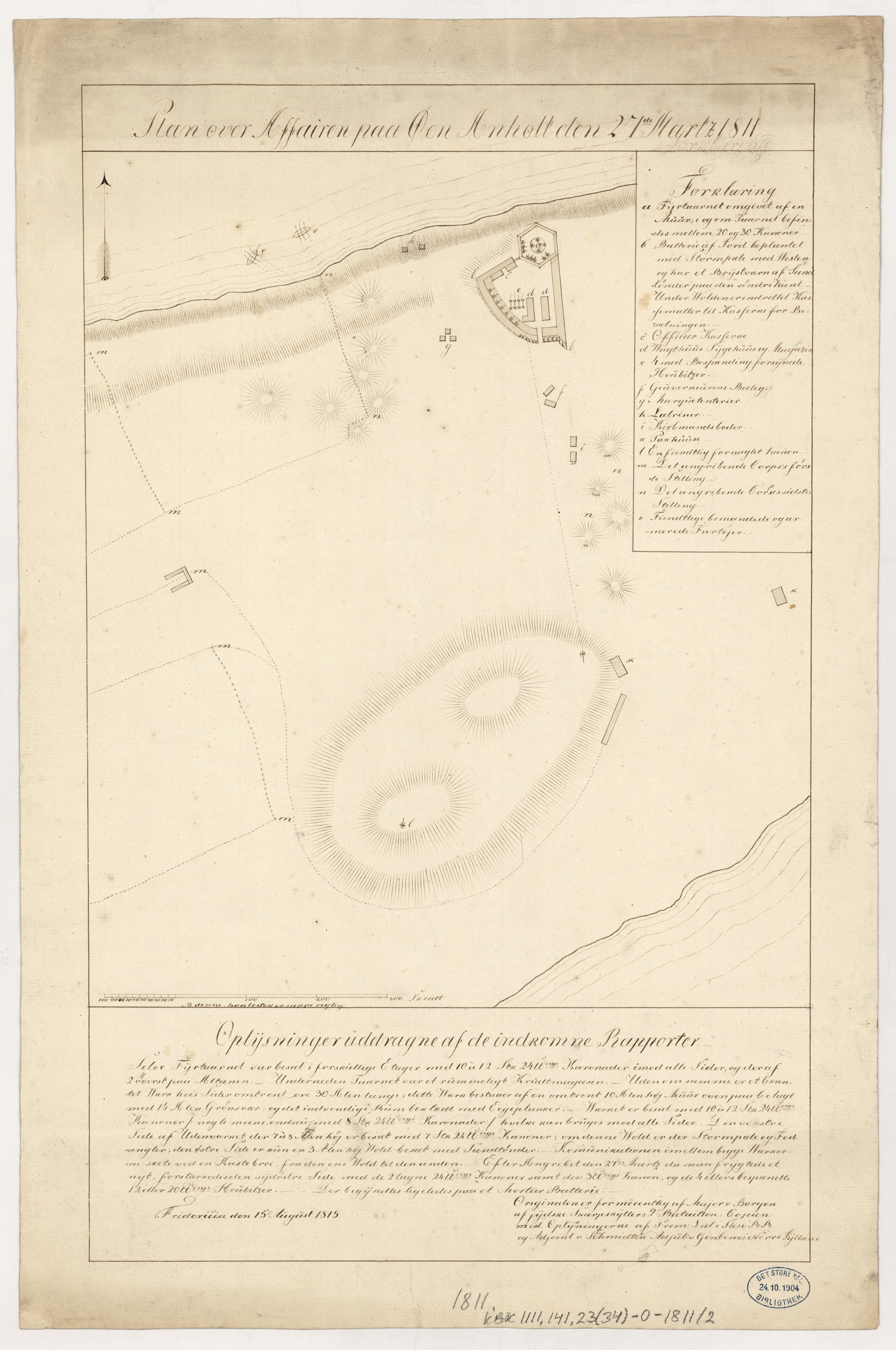
Plan of the events on 27 March 1811

- 3 March – Sparekassen Bikuben is founded in Copenhagen.
- 27 March – The Battle of Anholt during the Gunboat War.
- 30 June – Hassel & Teudt is founded in Copenhagen.
- 26 October – HDMS Najaden is launched at Nyholm in Copenhagen.

=== Undated ===
- Christiani & Grisson is founded.

== Births ==
=== January–March ===
- 27 January – Else Fenger, businesswoman (born 1737)
- 6 February – Peter Gemzøe, painter and lithographer (died 1879)
- 18 February – Camillus Nyrop, instrument maker (died 1883)

=== April–June ===
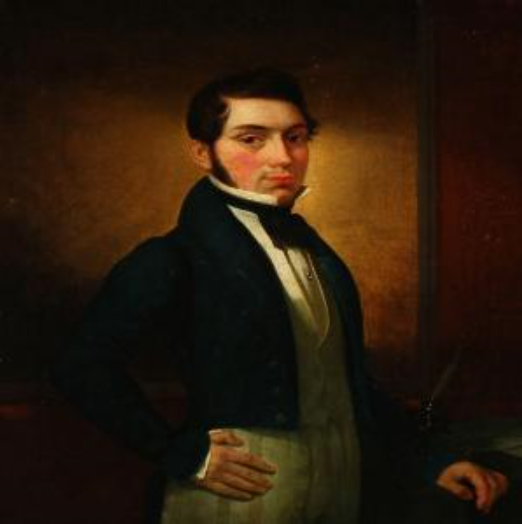
Christian August Broberg.

- 3 April – Christian August Broberg, businessman and politician (died 1886)
- 23 April – Carl Ferdinand Allen, historian (died 1871)
- 12 May – Johannes Peter Langgaard, businessman and brickyard owner (died 1890)

=== July–September ===
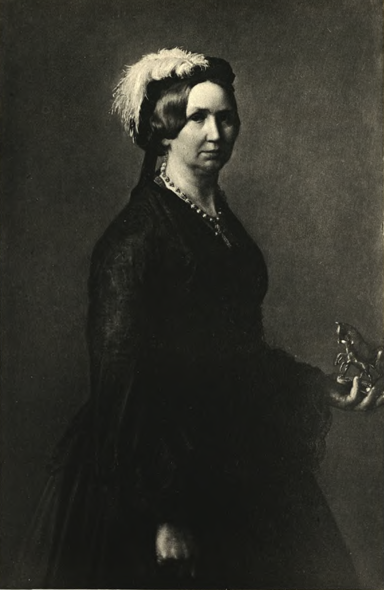
Adelgunde Vogt.

- 17 July – Adelgunde Vogt, sculptor (died 1892)
- 16 August – Adam August Müller, painter (died 1844)
- 2 September – J. C. Jacobsen, brewer, industrialist, founder of Carlsberg (died 1887)

=== October–December ===
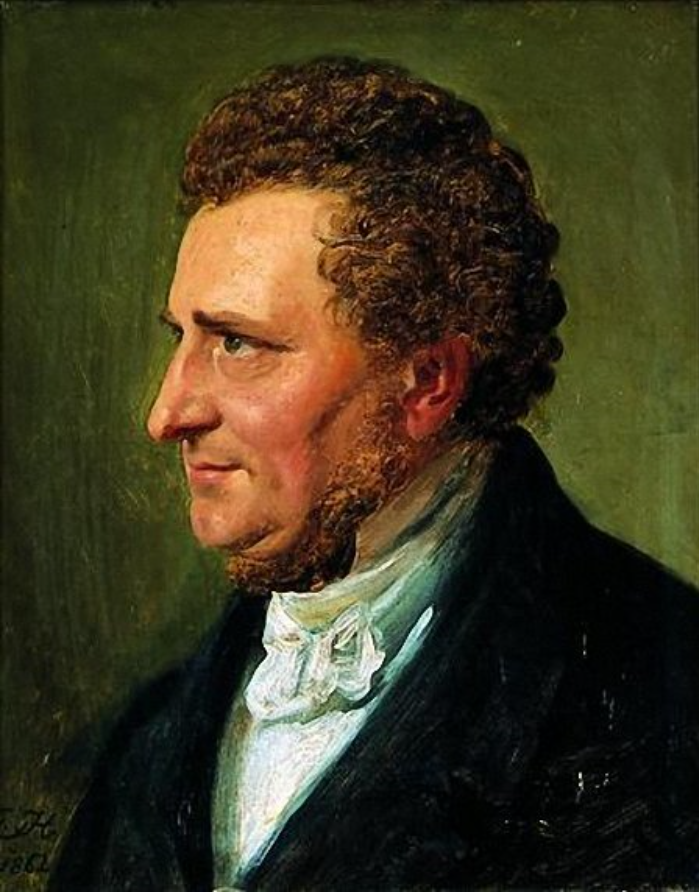
Martin Hammerich.

- 23 November – Elise Holst, stage actress (died 1891)
- 17 November – Signe Giebelhausen, actress (died 1879 in Norway)
- 24 November – Ditlev Gothard Monrad, politician and bishop (died 1887)
- 4 December – Martin Hammerich, literary historian and educator (died 1881)
- 31 December – Moritz Unna, photographer (died 1871)

== Deaths ==
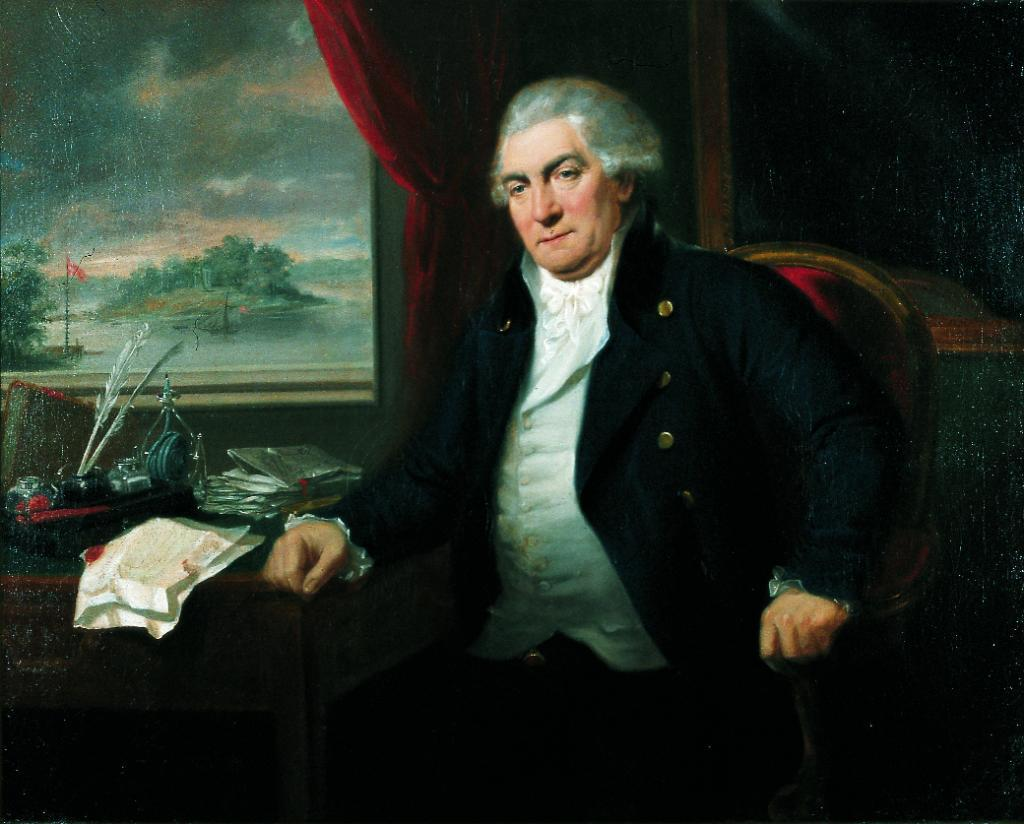
Frédéric de Coninck.

- 4 September – Frédéric de Coninck, merchant, ship owner (born 1740)
- 26 September – Cathrine Marie Møller, artist (born 1744)
- 29 September – Frederik Harboe, naval officer (born 1758)
- 12 October – Thomas Potter, industrialist (born 1745)
- 23 December – Emilie Rosing, singer (born 1783)
