= 1765 in Denmark =

- Decades: 1740s; 1750s; 1760s; 1770s; 1780s
- See also: Other events of 1765; List of years in Denmark

Events from the year 1765 in Denmark.

== Incumbents ==
- Monarch – Frederick V
- Prime minister – Count Johann Hartwig Ernst von Bernstorff

== Births ==
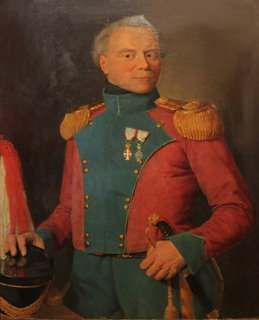
Andreas Hallander.

- 2 February – Hans Nansen, painter /died 1828)

=== January–March ===
- 10 June – Cladius Detlev Fritzsch, flower painter (died 1841)
- 18 February – Niels Stockfleth Darre, army officver (died 1809)

=== July–September ===
- 15 August – Christian Horneman, miniature painter (died 1844)
- 3 September – Johan Martin Quist, architect (died 1818)
- 28 September – Frederick Christian II, Duke, prince and feudal magnate (died 1814)

=== October–December ===
- 4 October – Johan Frederik Vilhelm Schlegel, jurist, colonial administrator (died 1836)
- 13 November – Andreas Hallander, architect and master builder (died 1828)
- 16 December – Christian Klingberg, Supreme Court attorney (died 1821)

Full date missing

- Poul Jensen Theilgaard, goldsmith (died 1823)

== Deaths ==
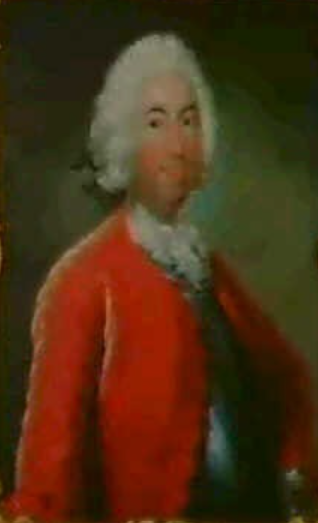
Herman Lengerken Kløcker.

=== January–March ===
- 18 March – Jens Kraft, philosopher (born 1720 in Norway)

=== October–December ===
- 9 October – Gottfried Johan Nerong, businessman (died 1832)
- 5 December – Johann Salomon Wahl, (born 1689 in Chemnitz).
- 4 December – Herman Lengerken Kløcker, merchant, landowner, Supreme Court justice and vice mayor of Copenhagen (born 1706)
- 18 December – Alexia de Lode, engraver (born 1737)
