= 1737 in Denmark =

- Decades: 1710s; 1720s; 1730s; 1740s; 1750s
- See also: Other events of 1737; List of years in Denmark

Events from the year 1737 in Denmark.

== Incumbents ==
- Monarch – Christian VI
- Prime minister – Johan Ludvig Holstein-Ledreborg

== Events ==
- 28 November – Vallø Stift is established.

== Births ==
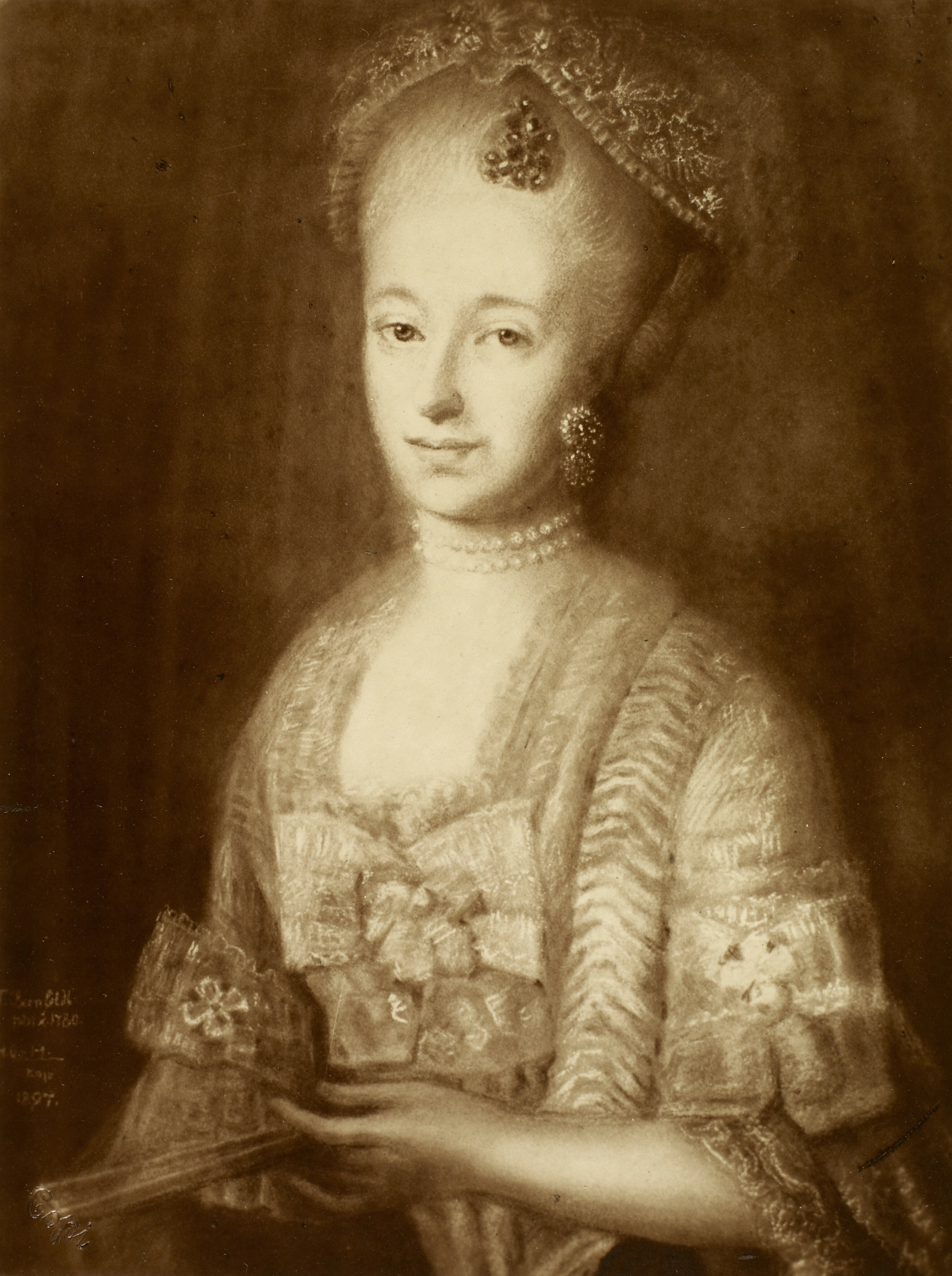
Else Fenger.

- 4 February – Jørgen Erik Skeel, prime minister of Denmark (died 1795)
- 22 May – Ernst Peymann, army officer (died 1823)
- 18 June – Else Fenger, businesswoman (died 1811)
- 30 September
  - Morten Thrane Brünnich, natural scientist (died 1827)
  - Magdalene Bärens, flower painter (died 1808)

=== Full date missing ===
- Alexia de Lode, engraver (born 1765)

== Deaths ==
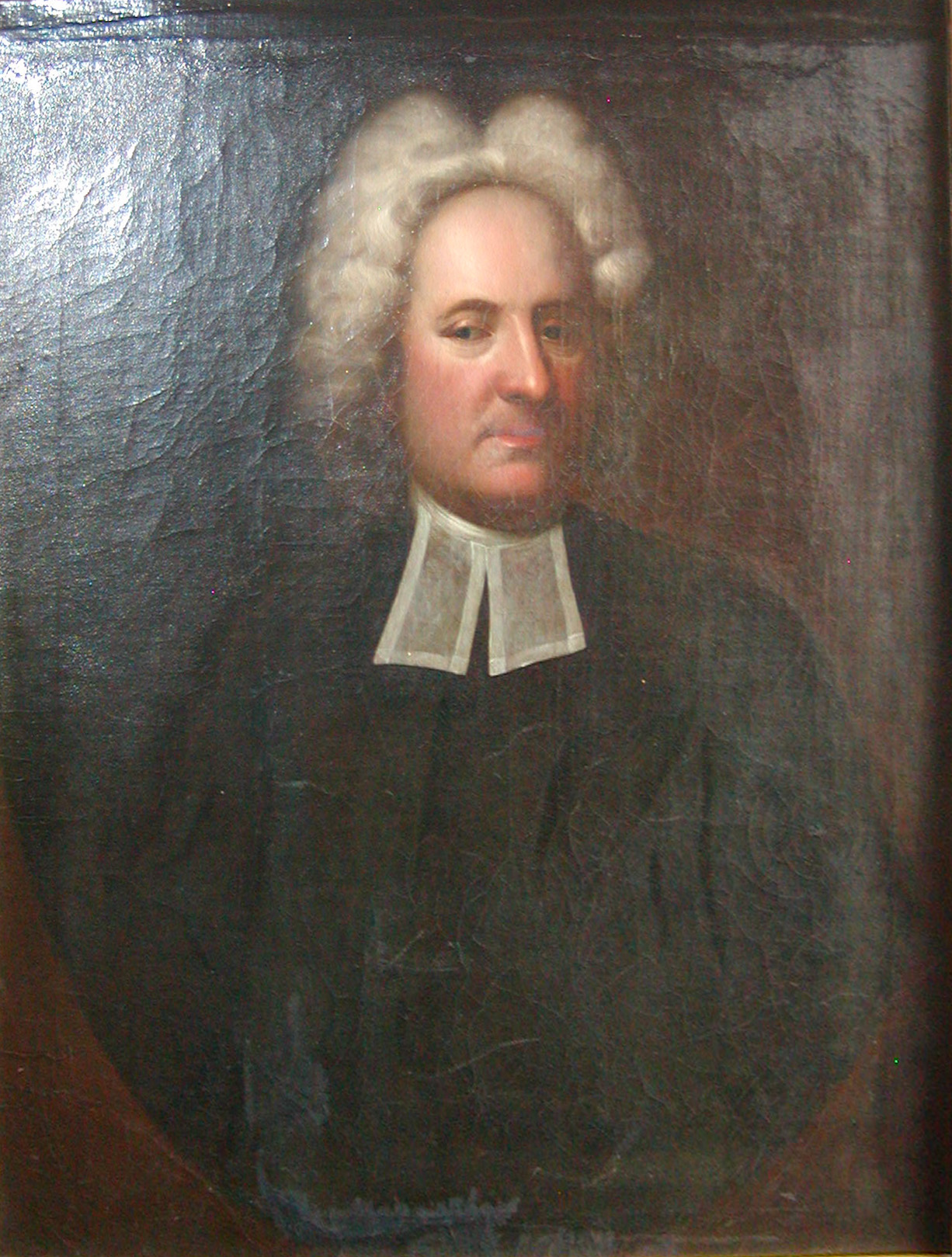
Christen Worm.

- 6 March – Alexander Frederik von Møsting, county governor (born 1650)
- 23 March – Bendix Grodtschilling the Youngest, painter (born 1686)
- 23 August – Sophie Christiane of Wolfstein, noblewoman (born 1667 in Bavaria)
- 9 October – Christen Worm, theologian (born 1672)
