= 1767 in Denmark =

- Decades: 1740s; 1750s; 1760s; 1770s; 1780s
- See also: Other events of 1767; List of years in Denmark

Events occurred in 1767 in Denmark.

== Incumbents ==
- Monarch – Christian VII
- Prime minister – Count Johann Hartwig Ernst von Bernstorff

== Events ==
January

- 2 January – The newspaper Aalborg Stiftstidende is published for the first time in Aalborg.

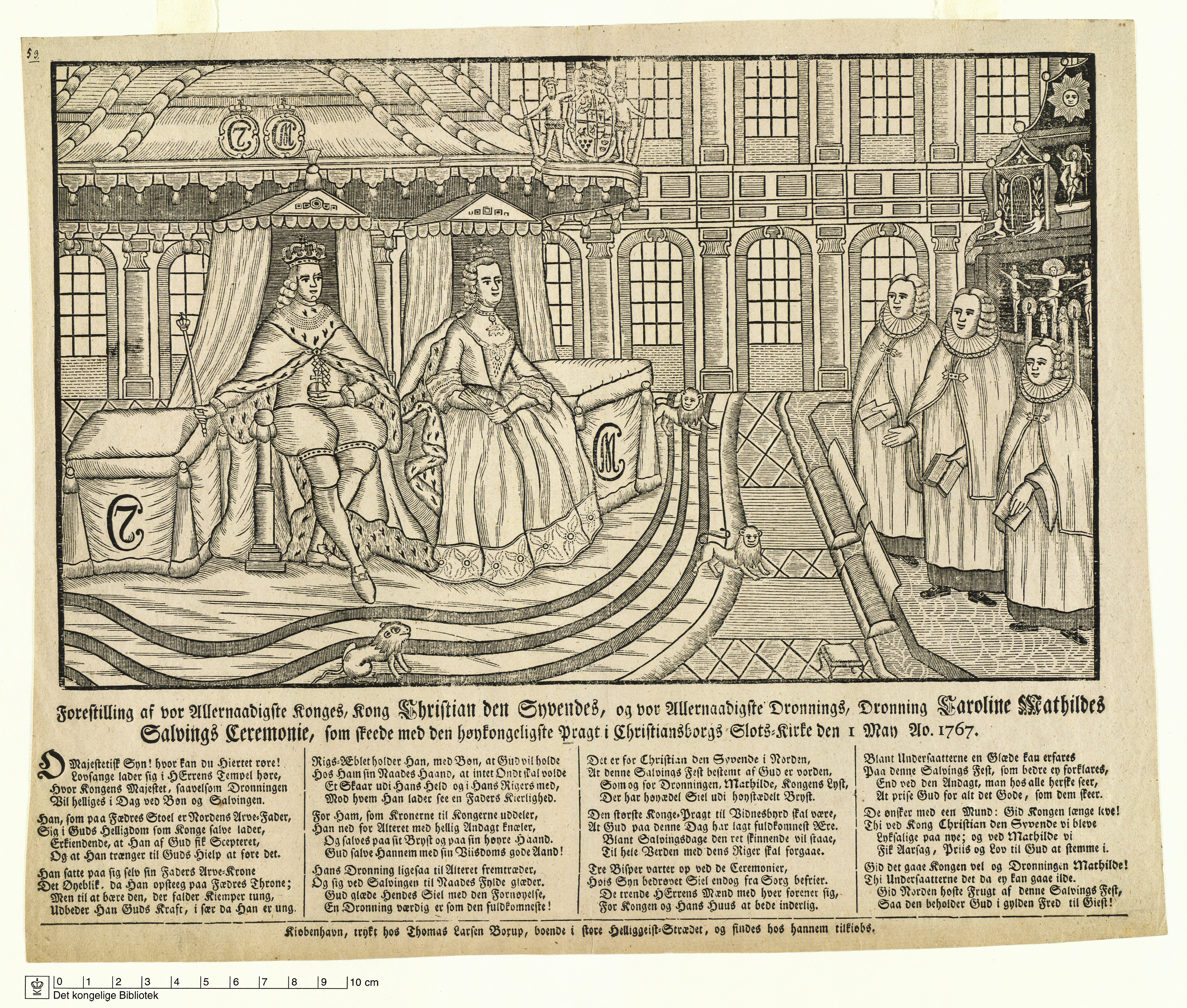
1 May: Anointing of Christian VII and Caroline Mathilde at Christiansborg Palace.

May

- 1 May – Anointing of Christian VII and Queen Caroline Mathilde at Christiansborg Palace.

=== Unated ===
- Nykøbing Castle is sold at auction and demolished. The bricks were used to build numerous estates and rectories in different parts of Falster. All that remains of the castle is a stump of wall from the Medieval prison tower known as Fars Hat (Father's Hat).
- Carsten Niebuhr returns to Copenhagen as the only surviving member of the Danish Arabia expedition.

== Births ==
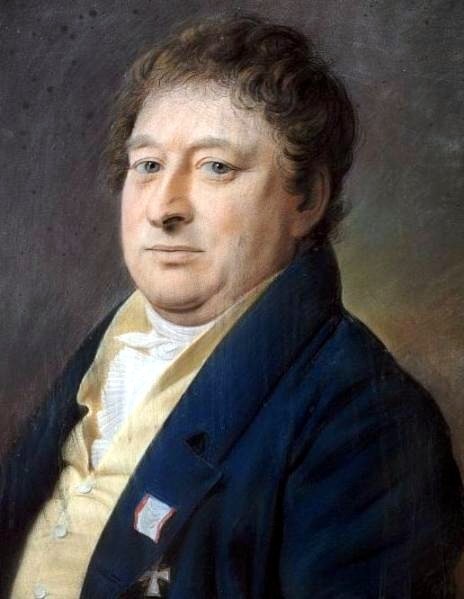
Gottfried Becker.

=== January–March ===
- 9 February – Gottfried Becker, pharmacist and industrialist (died 1845)
- 10 February – Harboe Meulengracht, businessman (died 1853)

=== October–December ===
- 28 October – Iver Qvistgaard, civil servant, landowner and mayor (died 1829)
- 27 December – Peter Leonhard Gianelli, medallist (died 1807)
- 28 October – Iver Qvistgaard, landowner and mayor (died 1829)
- 31 October – Amalie Münster, writer (died 1814)
- 8 December – Carl Adolph Rothe, naval officer and colonial administrator (died 1834)

=== Full date missing ===
- Peter Collett (writer), judge (died 1823)

== Deaths ==
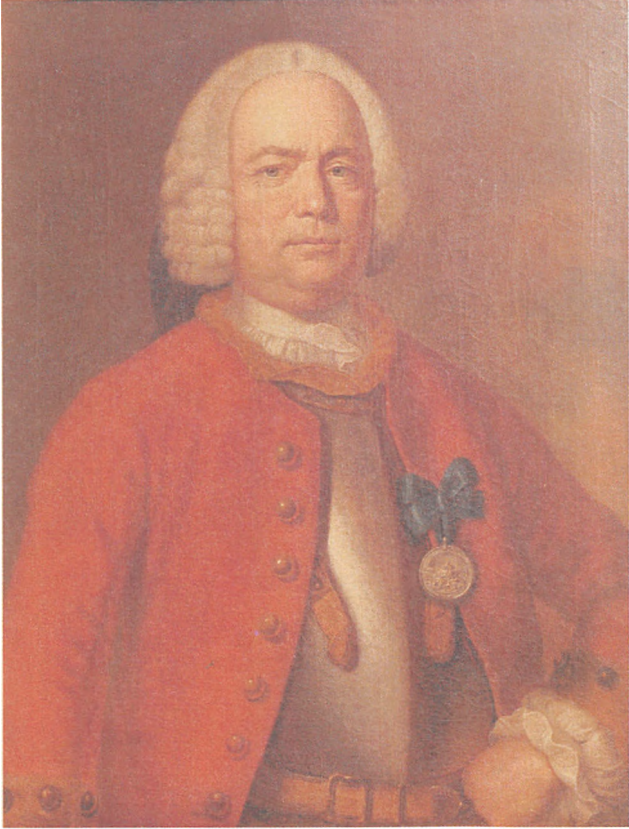
Christian Peter Flensborg,

- 24 June – Johan Henrik Freithoff, violinist and composer (born 1713).
- 8 August – Oluf Blach, merchant and ship-owner (born 1694)
- 22 January – Christian Peter Flensborg, naval officer (born 1692)
- 1 September – Carl Juel, statesman, councillor, and diocesan governor (born 1706)
