= 1832 in Denmark =

- Decades: 1810s; 1820s; 1830s; 1840s; 1850s
- See also: Other events of 1832; List of years in Denmark

Events from the year 1832 in Denmark.

== Incumbents ==
- Monarch – Frederick VI
- Prime minister – Otto Joachim

== Events ==
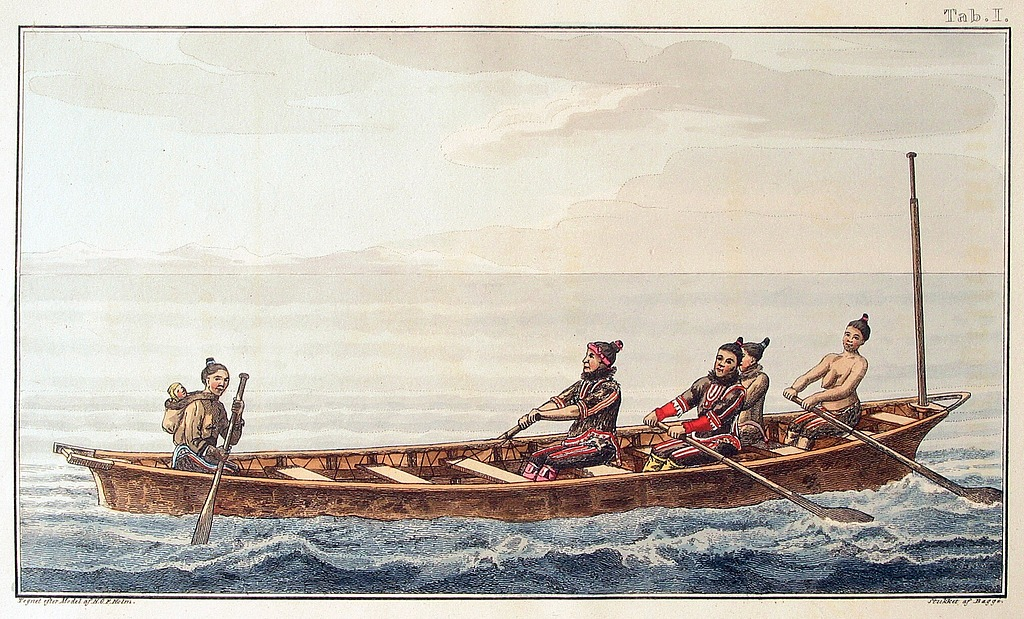
Illustration fra Undersøgelses-Reise til Østkysten af Grønland .

- 5 September – an ordinance requires workers to carry a Skudsmålsbog as record of their employment.

== Culture ==
=== Visual arts ===
- Charlottenborg Spring Exhibition: Wilhelm Marstrand's A Street Scene in the Dog Days is among the exhibited art works.

== Births ==
=== January–March ===
- 23 January – Regine Olsen, fiancé of Søren Kierkegaard (died 1904)
- 11 February – Thomas Skat Rørdam, theologian and bishop (died 1909)

=== April–June ===
- 26 April – Carl Ludvig Gerlach, composer and opera singer (died 1893)
- 17 July – Elfride Fibiger, writer (died 1911)

=== July–September ===
- 2 August – Ida Marie Bille, courtier (died 1902)

=== October–December ===
- 14 October – Fanny Suenssen, author (died 1918)
- 21 October – Valdemar Tofte, violinist (died 1907)
- 28 October – Caroline Hammer, photographer (died 1916)

== Deaths ==
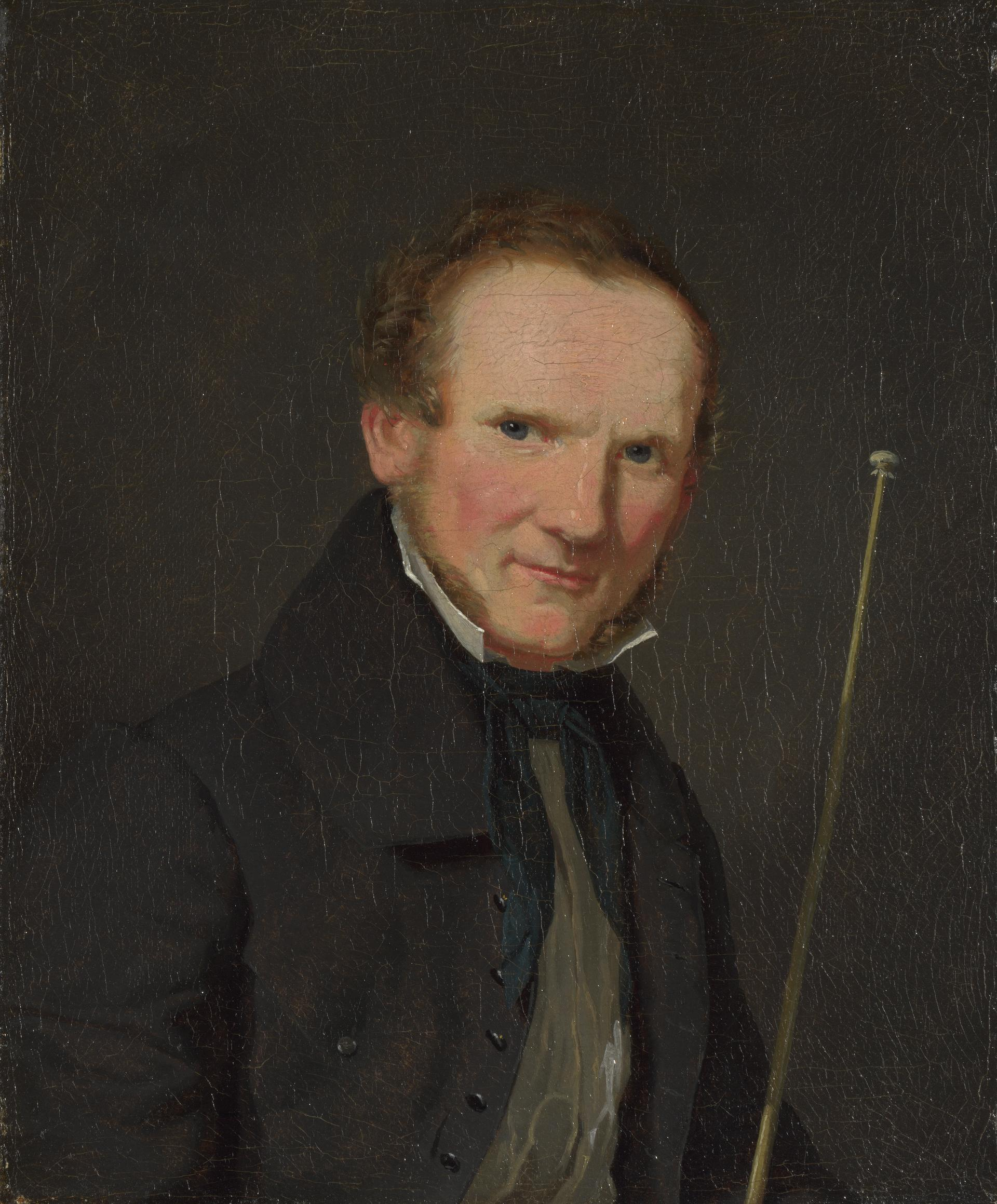
Wilhelm Bendz,

=== January–March ===
- 15 February – Hardenack Otto Conrad Zinck, composer (born 1746)
- 26 February Peter Schousboe, botanist (born 1877)
- 12 March – Friedrich Kuhlau, composer (born 1786 in Germany)
- 27 March– Birgithe Kühle, hournalist (born 1872)

=== April–June ===
- 18 April – Peter Nicolay Skibsted, naval officer (born 1787)
- 1 June – Gottfried Johan Nerong, businessman (born 1765)

=== October–December ===
- 6 October – Juliane Marie Jessen, author and translator (born 1760)
- 14 November
  - Wilhelm Bendz, painter (born 1804)
  - Rasmus Christian Rask, scholar and philologist (born 1787)
