= 1766 in Denmark =

- Decades: 1740s; 1750s; 1760s; 1770s; 1780s
- See also: Other events of 1766; List of years in Denmark

Events from the year 1766 in Denmark.

== Incumbents ==
- Monarch – Frederick V (until 14 January), Christian VII
- Prime minister – Count Johann Hartwig Ernst von Bernstorff

== Events ==
January

- 14 January – Crown Prince Christian becomes King Christian VII of Denmark.

March

- 4 March – The funeral of Frederick V of Denmark takes place at Roskilde Cathedral.

September

- 9 September – when Christian VII sells most of the royal holdings on the island of Falster (divided into 10 estates) by auction to make payments on Denmark's sovereign debt
  - Kongens Stubbekøbingjorder (Carlsfelt) is sold to Jørgen Schiønning on behalf of Prince Charles of Hesse-Kassel.
  - Corselitze is sold to Prince Charles of Hesse-Kassel-,
  - Egensegård (later Valnæsgård is sold to Hans Bergeshagen,
  - Gjedsergaard is sold to Frederik Holck-Winterfeldt-
  - Hvededahl
  - Orupgaard is sold to Christian Hincheldey.
  - Skiørringgaard
  - Slangerup
  - Klodskov (Estate No. 7, later Vennerslund) is sold to Peter Thestrup for 59724 rigsdale.
- Vesterborg
  - Skørringe os sold to Ole Jensen Stampe.

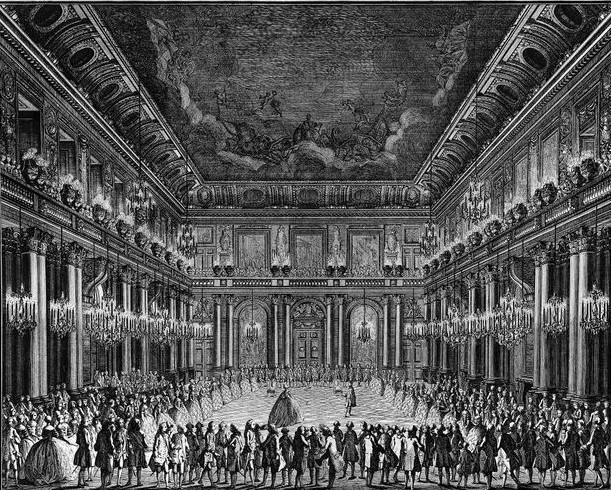
8 November: First dance of King Christian VII and Caroline Mathilde at Christiansborg Palace

October

- 20 October - Christian Tychsen is appointed as governor of the Danish Gold Coast as the first on a regular basis.

November

- 4 November Wedding of Gustav III and Sophia Magdalena
- 8 November
  - The wedding of Christian VII and Caroline Matilda of Great Britain takes place at Christiansborg Palace accompanied by extensive celebrations throughout the city. The couple has already been married by proxy in London on 1 October.
  - The event is in the same time the inauguration of the Great Hall of the still not completed royal palace.

=== Undated ===
- Anna Sophie Magdalene Frederikke Ulrikke demands a pension from the Danish royal house with the claim that she was the illegitimate daughter of King Christian VI.

== Births ==
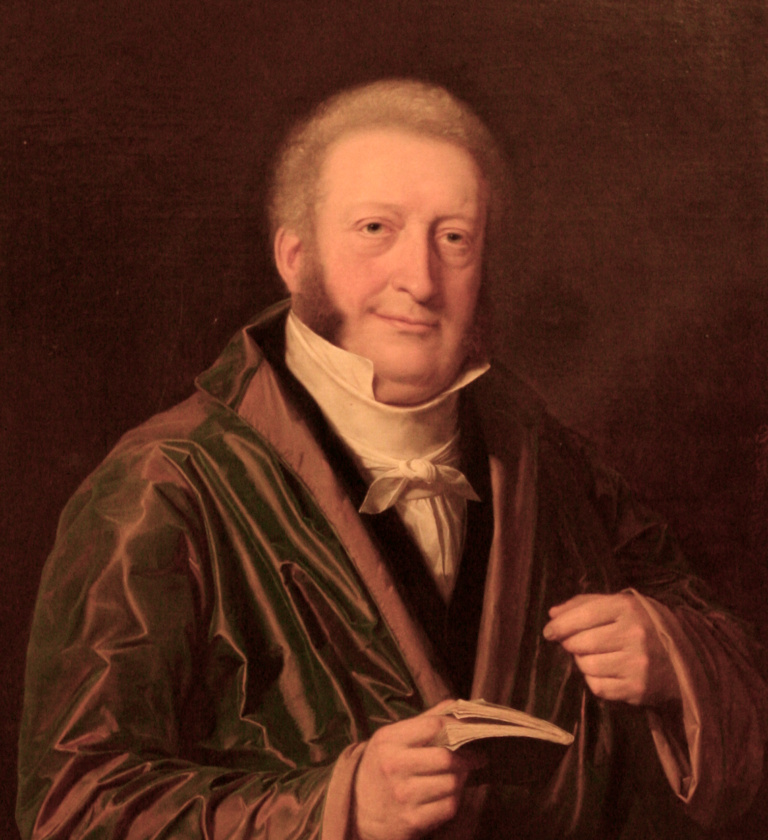
Peter Jørgen Frydendahl.

- 17 August – Peter Schousboe, botanist (died 1832 in Morocco)
- 16 September – Jes Bundsen, architectural printmaker (died 1829)
- 6 October – Christian Steen, publisher (died 1861)
- 18 October – Peter Jørgen Frydendahl, actor (died 1830)

== Deaths ==
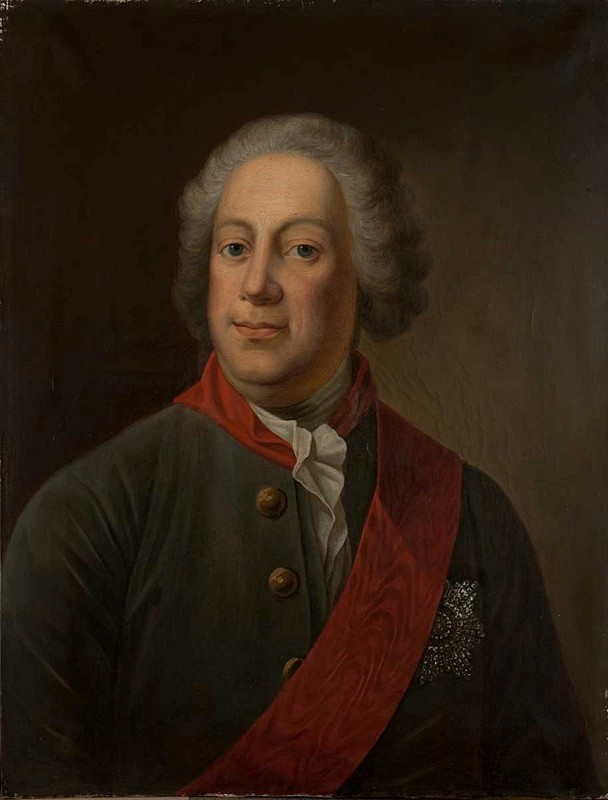
Iogann Korf.

- 14 January – Frederick V, Danish king (born 1723)
- 7 April – Iogann Korf.jpg, diplomat (born 1697)
- 7 May – Just Fabritius, businessman (born 1703)
- 17 September – Philip de Lange, architect (born c. 1705)
