= 1814 in Denmark =

- Decades: 1790s; 1800s; 1810s; 1820s; 1830s
- See also: Other events of 1814; List of years in Denmark

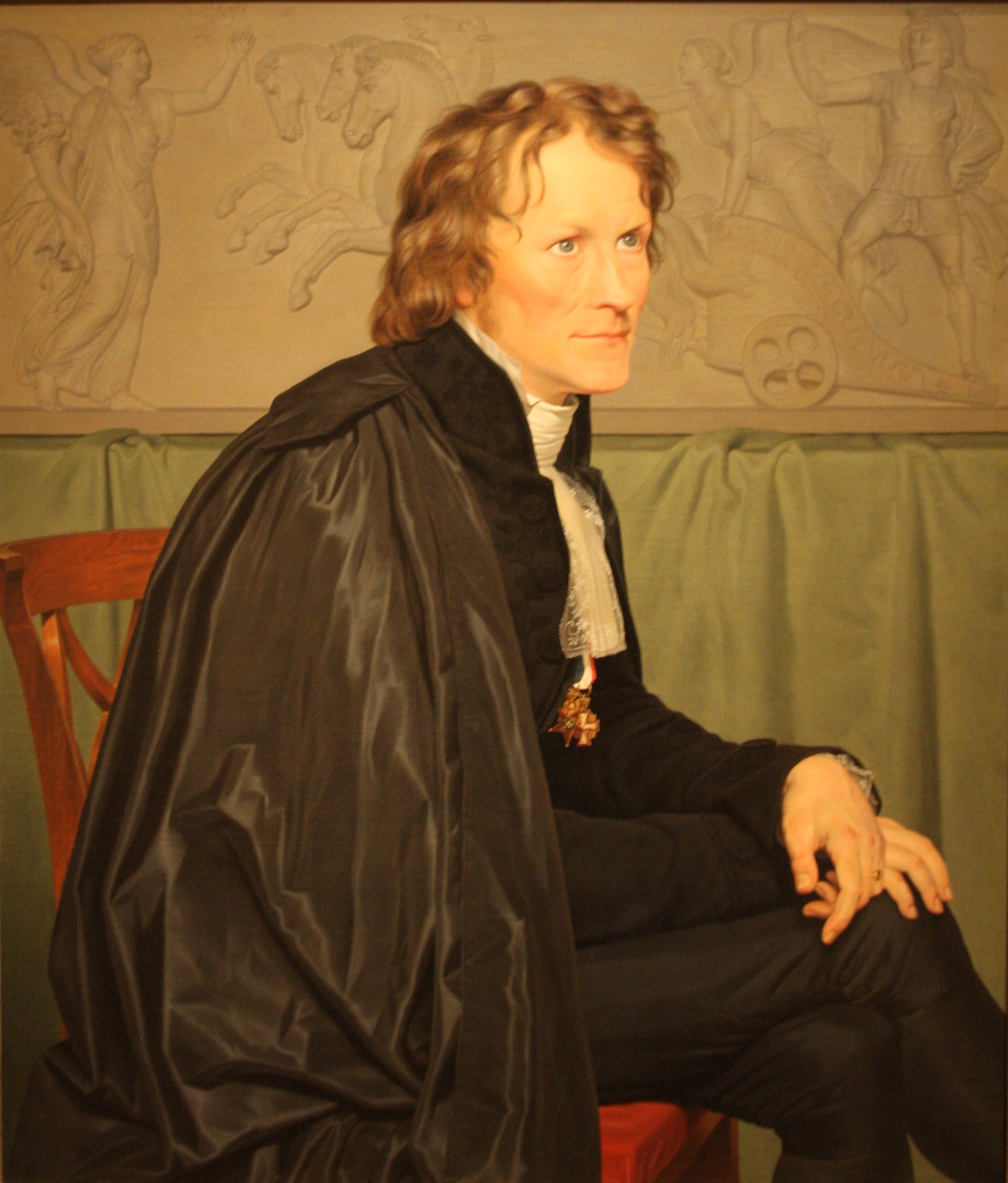
Portrait of Bertel Thorvaldsen. 1814, the Royal Danish Academy of Fine Arts

Events from the year 1814 in Denmark.

== Incumbents ==
- Monarch – Frederick VI
- Prime minister – Frederik Moltke, Fredrik Julius Kaas, Joachim Godske Moltke

== Events ==
- 14 January – The signing of the Treaty of Kiel
  - The Gunboat War ends.
  - Helgoland is ceded to the United Kingdom.
  - Kingdom of Norway is ceded to the King of Sweden, ending the Danish-Norwegian Union.
  - Anholt is returned to Denmark.
  - Faroe Islands, Greenland and Iceland becomes a part of Denmark.

== Births ==
- 7 May – Christian Julius Hansen, composer, organist, voice teacher and choirmaster (died 1875)
- 9 May – Princess Marie Luise Charlotte of Hesse-Kassel (died 1895)

Ø3 July – Ferdinand Didrichsen, physician and botanist (died 1887)

- 24 November – Adolph Hannover, physician (died 1894)
- 11 December – Georg Emil Tuxen. maval officer (born 1885)

== Deaths ==
- 14 June – Frederick Christian II, Duke, prince and feudal magnate (born 1765)
- 3 September – Amalie Münster, writer (born 1767)

=== Full date missing ===
- Hans Christian Ondrup, master builder, stucco artist and porcelain painter (born 1751)
