= Companion =

Companion may refer to:

== Relationships ==
=== Currently ===
- Any of several interpersonal relationships such as friend or acquaintance
- A domestic partner, akin to a spouse
- Sober companion, an addiction treatment coach
- Companion (caregiving), a caregiver, such as a nurse assistant, paid to give a patient one-on-one attention

=== Historically ===
- A concubine, a long-term sexual partner not accorded the status of marriage
- Lady's companion, a historic term for a genteel woman who was paid to live with a woman of rank or wealth
- Companion cavalry, the elite cavalry of Alexander the Great
- Foot Companion, the primary type of soldier in the army of Alexander the Great
- Companions of William the Conqueror, those who took part in the Norman conquest of England
- Muhammad's companions, the Sahaba, the friends who surrounded the prophet of Islam

== Film and television ==
- Companion (film), a 2025 American film
- Companion (Doctor Who), a character who travels with the Doctor in the TV series Doctor Who
- Companion (Firefly), a type of courtesan and entertainer in the TV series Firefly
- The Companion (1984 film), a South Korean film of 1984
- The Companion (1994 film), a Universal Television film
- The Companion (2015 film), a Cuban film
- "The Companions", part two of Doctor Who Greatest Moments, a 2009 clip show series related to Doctor Who

== Literature ==
- "The Companion" (fairy tale), a Norwegian fairy tale
- "The Companion" (short story), a story by Agatha Christie in her 1932 collection The Thirteen Problems
- The Companion, an 1828 literary journal published by Leigh Hunt

== Music ==
- Companion, a 1999 album by Patricia Barber
- "Companion", a song by Nikki Lane from the 2017 album Highway Queen
- Companions (album), by Raphe Malik, 2002
- Companions (EP), by Mixtapes, 2011

== Other uses ==
- Bearhawk Companion, an American homebuilt aircraft design, with two seats in side-by-side configuration
- Companion 21, an American sailboat design
- Companion (ship), an architectural feature of ships
- Companion animal, a pet animal kept for companionship
  - Companion parrot, a pet parrot that interacts with its owner
- Companion matrix, a matrix with a specific relation to its characteristic polynomial p
- Companion planting, planting of different crops in close physical proximity
- "Companion series", a sister show in television
- Companion star, a star in a binary system
- Companion weapon, an object held in the non-sword hand while fencing
- A handbook, Guidebook, or compendium, e.g. Star Trek: Deep Space Nine Companion or The Oxford Companion to Music
- A member of a Holy Royal Arch chapter
- A rank within many state-awarded orders
