= Rådhusstræde 11 =

Building in Copenhagen, Denmark

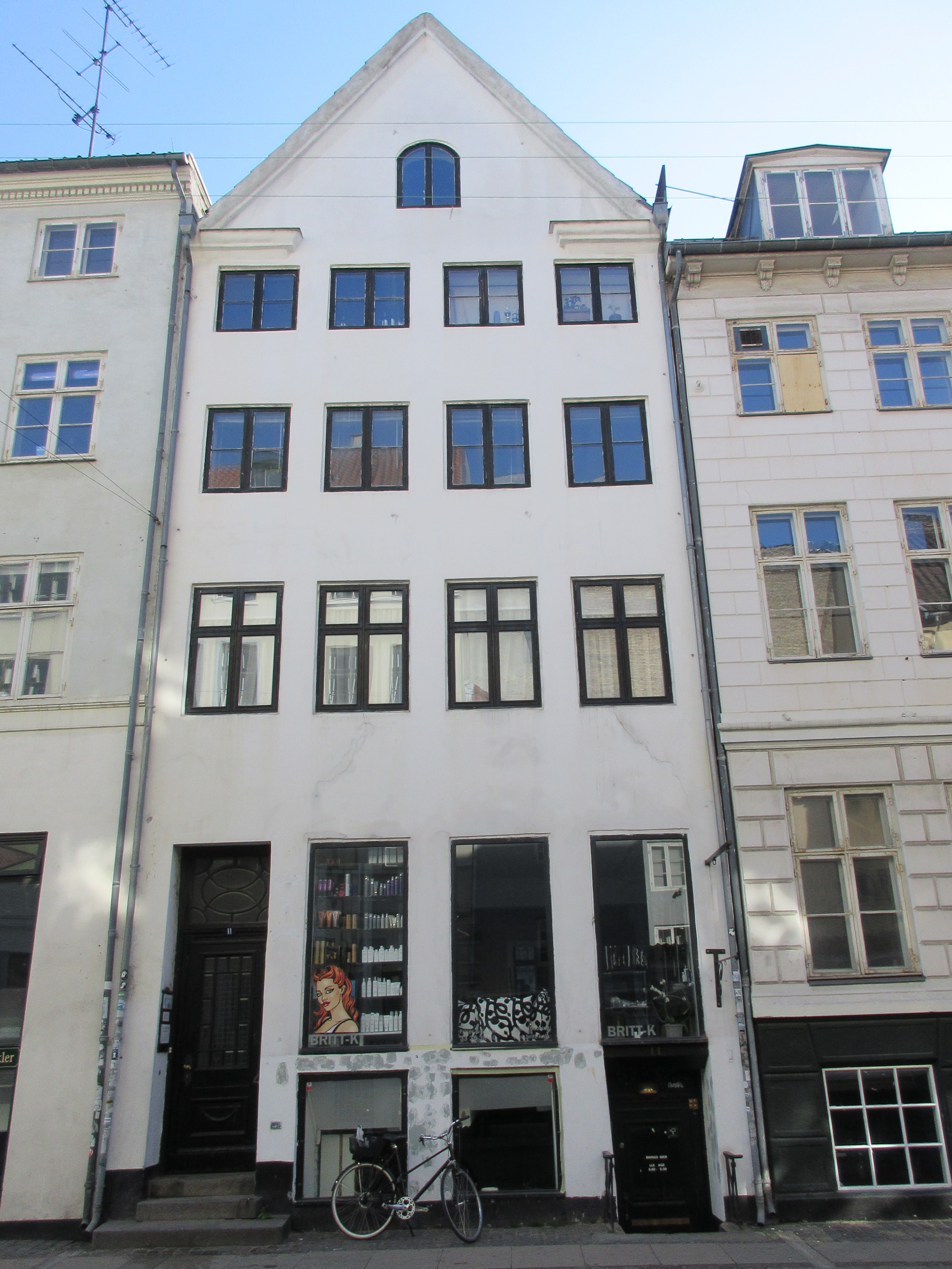
- Interactive map of the Rådhusstræde 11 area

General information
- Location: Copenhagen, Denmark
- Coordinates: 55°40′35.54″N 12°34′28.63″E
- Completed: 1732

Rådhusstræde 11 is an early 18th-century building on Rådhusstræde, between Gammeltorv-Nytorv and Frederiksholms Kanal, in the Old Town of Copenhagen, Denmark. It was listed in the Danish registry of protected buildings and places in 1945. The Supreme Court attorney Christian Klingberg lived in the building as a child.

== History ==
=== 18th century ===
The property was listed as No. 49 in Snaren's Quarter in Copenhagen's first cadastre of 1689. It was at that time owned by tailor Morten Jensen. The current building on the site was constructed in 1730–1734 for lawyer Andreas Bruun. The property was listed as No. 43 in the new cadastre of 1756 and was then owned by Bruun's widow.

At the time of the 1787 census, the building was home to 17 residents in four households. Lauritz Reitzer, a royal lackey, resided in one of the apartments with his wife Magrethe Sofie Jæger, his father-in-law Christian Jæger and two maids. Karen Lund Klingberg, a 54-year-old widow with a pension from Enkekassen, resided in the building with her son Christian Klingberg (1876–1821), who would later become a prominent Supreme Court attorney, and one maid. Her late husband Jacob Klingberg had served as notarius publicus in the Danish West Indies. The third household consisted of plumber and fireman Jacob Hansen Bennefeet and his wife Anne Kirstine. Jens Ibsen, another royal lackey, resided in the building with his wife Dorthe Catrine, their two children (aged one and eight), an eight-year-old boy who lived with them after orders from the Crown Prince, a wet nurse and a maid.

=== Kield Clementsen, c. 1800-1840s ===
The property belonged to the civil servant Kield Clemensen at the time of the 1801 census. He resided in the building with his wife Friderica Reutzer and two maids. Johannes Clemensen, a manager, resided in the building with his wife Sophia Amalie Stenum, their two sons (aged seven and nine) and one maid. Hans Peter Winge (1756–1826), a royal lackey and later steward of the Prince's Mansion, resided in the building with his wife Margretha Hvid, their two sons (aged 17 and 19), one maid, and one lodger. The last household consisted of plumber Jacob Beentfeld, his wife Anne Kirstine Pedersdatter and the three-year-old girl Maria Andrup.

Clementsen's property was listed in the new cadastre of 1806 as No. 41 in Snaren's Quarter. The military officer Jacob Elias Holm (1776-1842) resided in the building with his mother from at least 1818. They still lived there when his mother died in 1831. In 1832, he moved to the ground floor of Nybrogade No. 20 (now Nybrogade 24).

At the time of the 1840 census, the building was home to a total of nine people. 77-year-old Kjeld Clementsen was now residing on the ground floor with one maid. Laurits Clementsen, a naval surgeon, resided on the second floor with his employee Andrea Magdalene Ulriche Bastian. Chr. Hein. Just Hübner, a singer at the Royal Danish Theatre, resided on the first floor with his wife Fr. Magdalene Hübner and two maids. Christopher Schmidt, a Candidatus Philosoph., resided alone on the third floor.

=== 1860 census ===
At the time of the 1860 census, the building was home to a total of 18 people. Mathias Jernsen Top, a master bookbinder, resided in the ground floor apartment with his wife Anne Catrine née Larsen and lodger Hans Madsen. Frederik Schrøder, a policeman, resided on the first floor with his wife Andrea Nielsine Schrøder née Breder, 70-year-old widow Johanne Marie Breder, the widow's daughter Lovise Elisabeth Breder and lodger Heinrich Depenau. Frederikke Wilhelmine Albertine Zweig, a seamstress, resided alone on the second floor. Andrea Magdalene Uldrikke Bastian and Sidse Marie Nielsen, two widows, resided on the third floor with her adopted daughter Laura Caroline Kieldsine Frederiche Clemmentsen. Christian Wilhelm Lund, a tool grinder, resided in the basement with his wife Birthe Lund, their two children (aged two and twelve) and two lodgers.

=== 1880 census ===
At the time of the 1880 census, Rådhusstræde 11 was home to 14 residents. Carl Emil Jensen, a watchmaker, resided on the ground flor with his sister Caroline Jensen. August Speerschneider, a retailer of "galantry items" (gifts etc), resided on the first floor. Gotfred Frederik Schrøder, a police officer, resided on the second floor with his wife Bertha Charlotte, their two children (aged four and five) and one maid. Andrea Magdalene Baden and Louise Frederikke Gynther, two women in their 60s, one of them a seamstress and the other one dealing in finger rings, resided on the third floor. Anders Petersen, a workman, resided on the ground floor of the rear wing with his wife Maren Petersen, a maid and a lodger.

=== 20th century ===
At the time of the 1906 census Rådhusstræde 11 was home to ten people. Hans Christian Rasmussen, a brick molder, lived on the first floor with his wife Marie Rasmussen and their one-year-old daughter. Anders Andersen, a master shoemaker, lived on the second floor with his wife Rasmine Margrethe Andersen and their 16-year-old daughter Hilda Johanne Elise Andersen. Anna Augusta Jørgensen, a 48-year-old widow, lived on the third floor with her three daughters (aged 13 to 21).

== Architecture ==
Rådhusstræde 11 is constructed with four storeys over a walk-out basement. The plastered and white-painted facade is crowned by a gabled wall dormer with cornice returns in the full width of the building. An arched window in the gable was most likely originally topped by a pulley. The main entrance in the bay furthest to the left (north) is topped by a large transom window. The basement entrance in the bay furthest to the right (south) was until 1868 topped by a hood mould. The rear side of the building is also plastered and white-painted. A rear wing is located on the other side of the small courtyard. The building fronting the street was listed in the Danish registry of protected buildings and places in 1945 but the rear wing is not part of the heritage listing.

== Today ==
The building is currently owned by Flemming Hagemann A/S.
