= Lady's companion =

Obsolete domestic profession

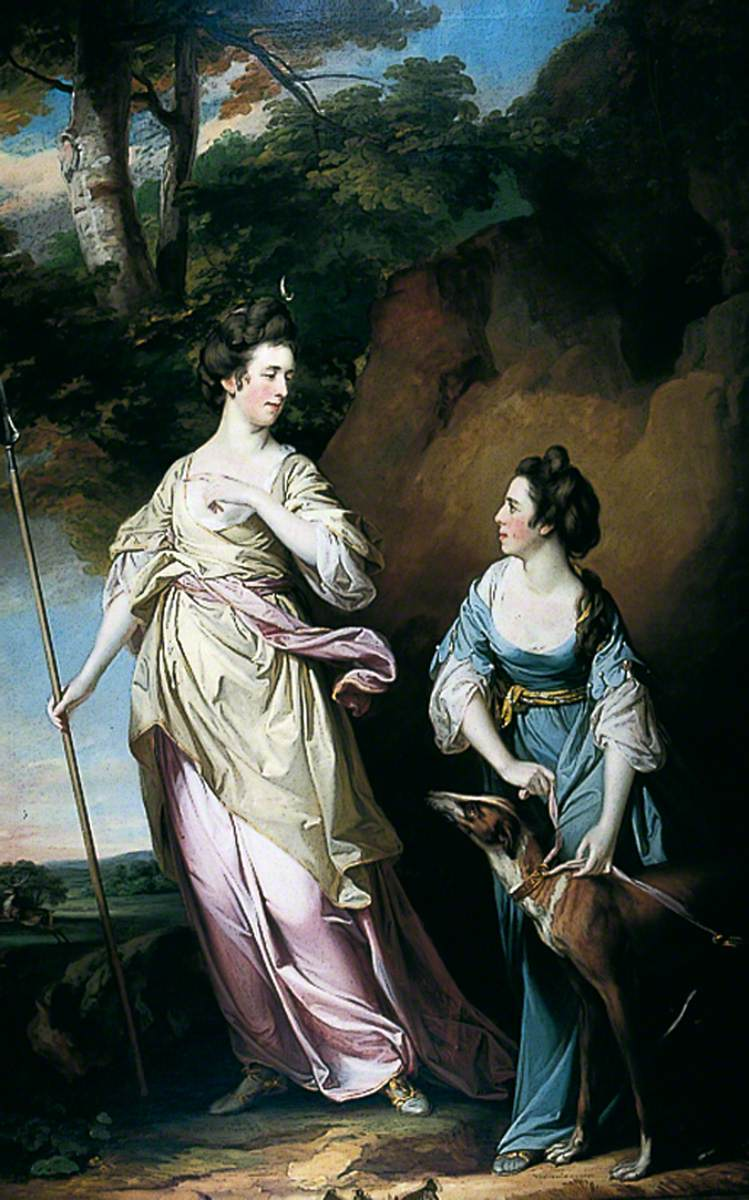
The Honourable Lady Stanhope and the Countess of Effingham as Diana, and Her Companion by Francis Cotes (1765)

A lady's companion was a woman of genteel birth who lived with a woman of rank or wealth as retainer. The term was in use in the United Kingdom from at least the 18th century to the mid-20th century but it has become archaic. The profession is known in most of the Western world. The role was related to the position of lady-in-waiting, which by the 19th century was applied only to the female retainers of female members of the British royal family. Ladies-in-waiting were usually women from the most privileged backgrounds who took the position for the prestige of associating with royalty, or for the enhanced marriage prospects available to those who spent time at court, but lady's companions usually took up their occupation because they needed to earn a living and have somewhere to live. A companion is not to be confused with lady's maid, a female personal attendant roughly equivalent to a "gentleman's gentleman" or valet, who would often be from a more working class background.

== Status and duties ==
Like a governess, a lady's companion was not regarded as a servant, but neither was she treated as an equal; however, her position in the household of her employer was notably less awkward and solitary than that of a governess. Only women from a class background similar to or only a little below that of their employer would be considered for the position. Women took positions as companions if they had no other means of support, as until the late 19th century there were very few other ways in which an upper- or upper-middle-class woman could earn a living which did not result in a complete loss of her class status. (Employment as a governess, running a private girls' school and writing were virtually the only other such options; hence the formation of the Society for Promoting the Employment of Women in 1859.)

The companion's role was to spend her time with her employer, providing company and conversation, to help her to entertain guests and often to accompany her to social events. In return she would be given a room in the family's part of the house, rather than the servants' quarters; all of her meals would be provided, and she would eat with her employer; and she would be paid a small salary, which would be called an "allowance" – never "wages". She would not be expected to perform any domestic duties which her employer might not carry out herself, in other words little other than giving directions to servants, fancy sewing and pouring tea. Thus the role was not very different from that of an adult relation in respect of the lady of a household, except for the essential subservience resulting from financial dependency.

Lady's companions were employed because upper- and middle-class women spent most of their time at home. A lady's companion might be taken on by an unmarried woman living on her own, by a widow, a married woman who lived with her husband and sons but had no daughters and desired female company, or by an unmarried woman who was living with her father or another male relation but had lost her mother, and was too old to have a governess. In the last case the companion would also act as a chaperone; at the time, it would not have been socially acceptable for a young lady to receive male visitors without either a male relation or an older lady present (a female servant would not have sufficed).

== Historical examples ==
- Louise Bjørnsen
- Élise la Flotte
- Ernestine Lambriquet
- Jeanne Julie Éléonore de Lespinasse
- Agnes McDonald
- Johanna Mestorf
- Cathrine Marie Møller
- Elizabeth Parish
- Mary Wollstonecraft served as companion to a wealthy widow, Sarah Dawson, in the spa town of Bath. It was her first job, aged 19 in 1778.

== In fiction ==
=== In the works of Agatha Christie ===
There are numerous lady's companions in the mysteries of Agatha Christie, e.g. After the Funeral. In her novels dating before the Second World War, the companion is presented as a conventional feature of the life of the moneyed classes. However, it is after the Second World War that desperation begins to creep in. The companions after the Second World War are generally elderly women who grew up in Victorian times without the expectation of having to provide for themselves, but who find themselves impoverished due to the decline of the fortunes of many once well-to-do families as a result of the Great Depression and the investment losses incurred during the War. At the same time, the women who employ them are often not so well off as they once were themselves, especially in net terms due to high rates of property taxation.

This situation is complicated by the collapse in the supply of working-class servants due to changing labour market conditions and social attitudes, so that companions are increasingly asked to perform domestic duties which they find humiliating, especially since they at one point had servants waiting on them. Along with the growing keenness of young middle-class women to take advantage of the broadening range of options available to them to have a career, this degradation of the status of the companion represents the closure of the era of the lady's companion in the United Kingdom.

=== Other examples ===
- In Vanity Fair, the protagonist Becky Sharp hires Miss Briggs as a companion she describes as a sheepdog, thus allowing her husband to leave her with propriety in the company of other men with whom she is flirting.
- Heidi, in the eponymous children's novel, is taken from her Swiss mountain home at the age of eight to become the companion of an invalid girl in Frankfurt, Germany.
- The unnamed narrator of Rebecca is a lady's companion as the novel begins.
- Miss Taylor, one of the first characters met in Jane Austen's novel Emma, lives with the Woodhouses "less as a governess than a friend" to her grown-up charge.
- Josephine March (and later, her youngest sister Amy) is a companion to her wealthy great-aunt in Louisa May Alcott's novel Little Women.
- Sarah Woodruff works as a companion in John Fowles's The French Lieutenant's Woman.
- Dorothy "Dot" Williams is Phryne Fisher's companion in Miss Fisher's Murder Mysteries (2012).
- Annette in Osbert Sitwell's A Place of One's Own (1945).
- The eponymous heroine of Emily Fox-Seton, Frances Hodgson Burnett's 1901 novel, had worked as a companion before marrying a wealthy nobleman, in a fashion similar to the plot of Cinderella.
- In Downton Abbey the film, Lady Bagshaw's illegitimate daughter Lucy was initially her lady's maid to hide her identity but was then presented as her mother's companion to make her more suitable as an heir to Lady Bagshaw's estates.

== See also ==
- Cicisbeo
- List of obsolete occupations
- Other meanings of companion, including personal health-care workers
