= Badstuegade 1H =

Listed building in Aarhus, Denmark

Coordinates: 56.1582°N 10.2079°E

- Badstuegade 1H
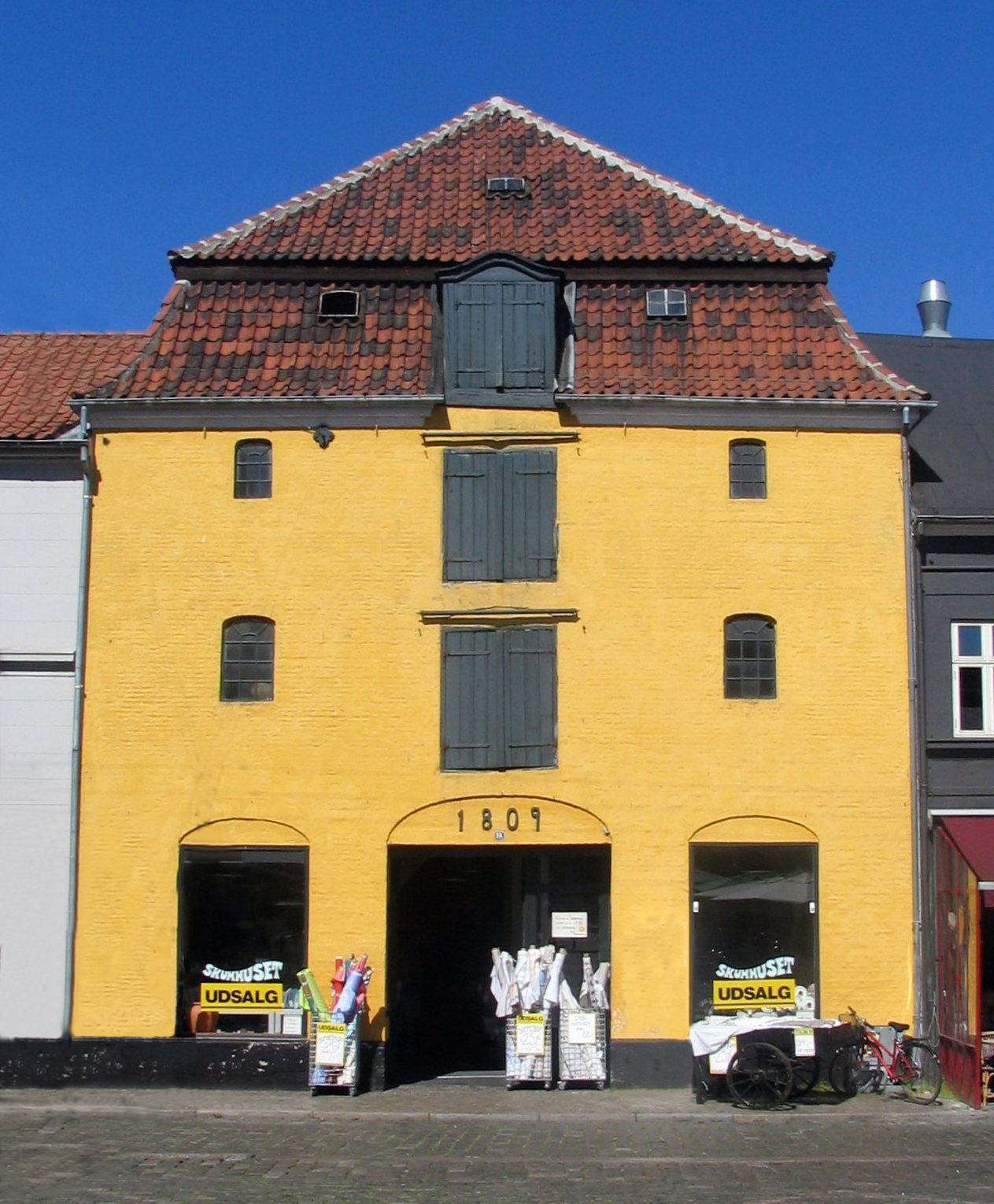
- Interactive map of the Badstuegade 1H area

General information
- Location: Aarhus, Denmark
- Completed: 1809

Technical details
- Floor count: 1

Badstuegade 1H is a house and a listed building in Aarhus, Denmark. The house was built in 1809 and was listed on the Danish registry of protected buildings and places by the Danish Heritage Agency on 7 October 1970. The house is situated in the historic and central Latin Quarter neighbourhood on Badstuegade by Pustervig square.

== History ==
The house was built by the merchant Harboe Meulengracht in 1809 as a warehouse to store imported products and it is one of the only remaining warehouses facing a street. In 1816, he built an adjacent villa facing Lille Torv and the two buildings forms a courtyard. The warehouse was listed in 1970 and carefully renovated in 1977 and the courtyard-facade was restored to its original appearance.

In 1998, the building was sold by Aarhus Municipality to the company Skumhuset (The Foam-house) operating a workshop specializing in foam and upholstery for furniture. In 2016, the company moved to the northern neighbourhood of Risskov and the warehouse was renovated to make room for new business tenants.

== Architecture ==
Meulengracht's warehouse represents one of the few examples of the Louis Seize style. It is a plastered brick building with rococo and baroque stylistic elements. The warehouse was renovated in 1977 when an old building in the courtyard was demolished making the building visible from all sides. The original wooden construction was replaced with concrete columns and the existing windows were replaced with wood plates with small openings.
