= Cathrine Marie Møller =

Danish artist (1744–1811)

- Born: February 21, 1744; Kolding, Denmark
- Died: September 26, 1811 (aged 67); Fredensborg, Asminderød sg, Denmark
- Education: Royal Danish Academy of Fine Arts
- Known for: Embroidery

Cathrine Marie Møller (1744–1811) was a Danish embroidery artist, credited with introducing a method of creating light and shadow within embroidery to Denmark. In 1790, she became the second woman inducted into the Royal Danish Academy of Fine Arts.

== Early life ==
Møller was born to Hans Christian Møller and Maren Bølling. At the age of seven she became the ward of her maternal uncle, who had her educated in textile works. After her confirmation, she supported herself as a lady's companion and made embroidery work for money. She also learned to draw to make her needle work easier.

== Embroidery ==
In 1780, Møller became a part of the household of F.A. Müller, who had a large collection of engravings, which reportedly inspired her in her innovation within the art of embroidery. By using black and grey, she created light and shadow within the embroidery images. While this technique had been known in Europe from the late 18th-century, it was not known in Denmark until she introduced it.

In 1789, the director of the Danish Academy, Johannes Wiedewelt, showed her work to the academy without her knowledge. In 1790, she was inducted as the second female member of the academy after Magdalene Bärens.

In 1794, she participated in the exhibition at Charlottenborg.
