= Companion 21 =

Sailboat class

Development
- Designer: Aborn Smith Jr.
- Location: United States
- Year: 1981
- Builder: Trump Yachts
- Name: Companion 21

Boat
- Displacement: 3,100 lb (1,406 kg)
- Draft: 2.75 ft (0.84 m)

Hull
- Type: monohull
- Construction: fiberglass
- LOA: 20.50 ft (6.25 m)
- LWL: 16.50 ft (5.03 m)
- Beam: 7.08 ft (2.16 m)
- Engine: outboard motor

Hull appendages
- Keel: long keel
- Ballast: 1,000 lb (454 kg)
- Rudder: keel-mounted rudder

Rig
- Rig type: Bermuda rig

Sails
- Sailplan: masthead sloop
- Total sail area: 218 sq ft (20.3 m^{2})

Racing
- PHRF: 303

The Companion 21 is an American trailerable sailboat that was designed by Aborn Smith Jr. and first built in 1981.

== Production ==
Born in 1929, Smith, who went by the first name "Denny", had become a tugboat deckhand at age 15. When he turned 16 he joined the US Army and served in Japan. Returning home after the Second World War he established an automotive repair business, Smith's Auto Body, in Stonington, Connecticut, United States. An active sailboat racer, he decided to start a boat building business after retiring and designed four sailboats for production. He named his business Trump Yachts and it was located in Stonington. The Companion 21 was built by Trump Yachts from 1981 to 1983. In 1984 the company was renamed Atlantic Yacht Services, moved to New London, Connecticut and went out of business in 1991. Smith died in 2007.

== Design ==
The Companion 21 is a recreational keelboat, built predominantly of fiberglass, with wood trim. It has a masthead sloop rig, a spooned raked stem; a raised counter, angled transom; a keel-mounted rudder controlled by a tiller and a fixed long keel. It displaces 3,100 lb (1,406 kg) and carries 1,000 lb (454 kg) of ballast.

The boat has a draft of 2.75 ft (0.84 m) with the standard keel and is normally fitted with a small 3 to 6 hp (2 to 4 kW) outboard motor for docking and maneuvering.

The design has sleeping accommodation for four people, with a double "V"-berth in the bow cabin and two straight settee quarter berths in the main cabin. There are no galley provisions. The head is located centered under the bow cabin "V"-berth. Cabin headroom is 55 in (140 cm).

The design has a PHRF racing average handicap of 303 and a hull speed of 5.4 kn (10.0 km/h).

== Operational history ==
In a 2010 review Steve Henkel wrote, "built of quality materials (cast lead ballast, solid bronze rudder post, solid teak trim and jointerwork), this is the kind of small yacht a proud owner might like to just sit in and polish. At sea she will behave herself, and if you need to go somewhere fast, there's always the outboard engine, conveniently located in a notch in the middle of the transom. Worst features: Under sail she will be slow ... As one owner aptly wrote when advertising his Companion 20 for sale, 'Great boat for beginner or retired person.' Sailors with more experience will want something faster."

== See also ==
- List of sailing boat types
