= Poul Jensen Theilgaard =

Danish goldsmith

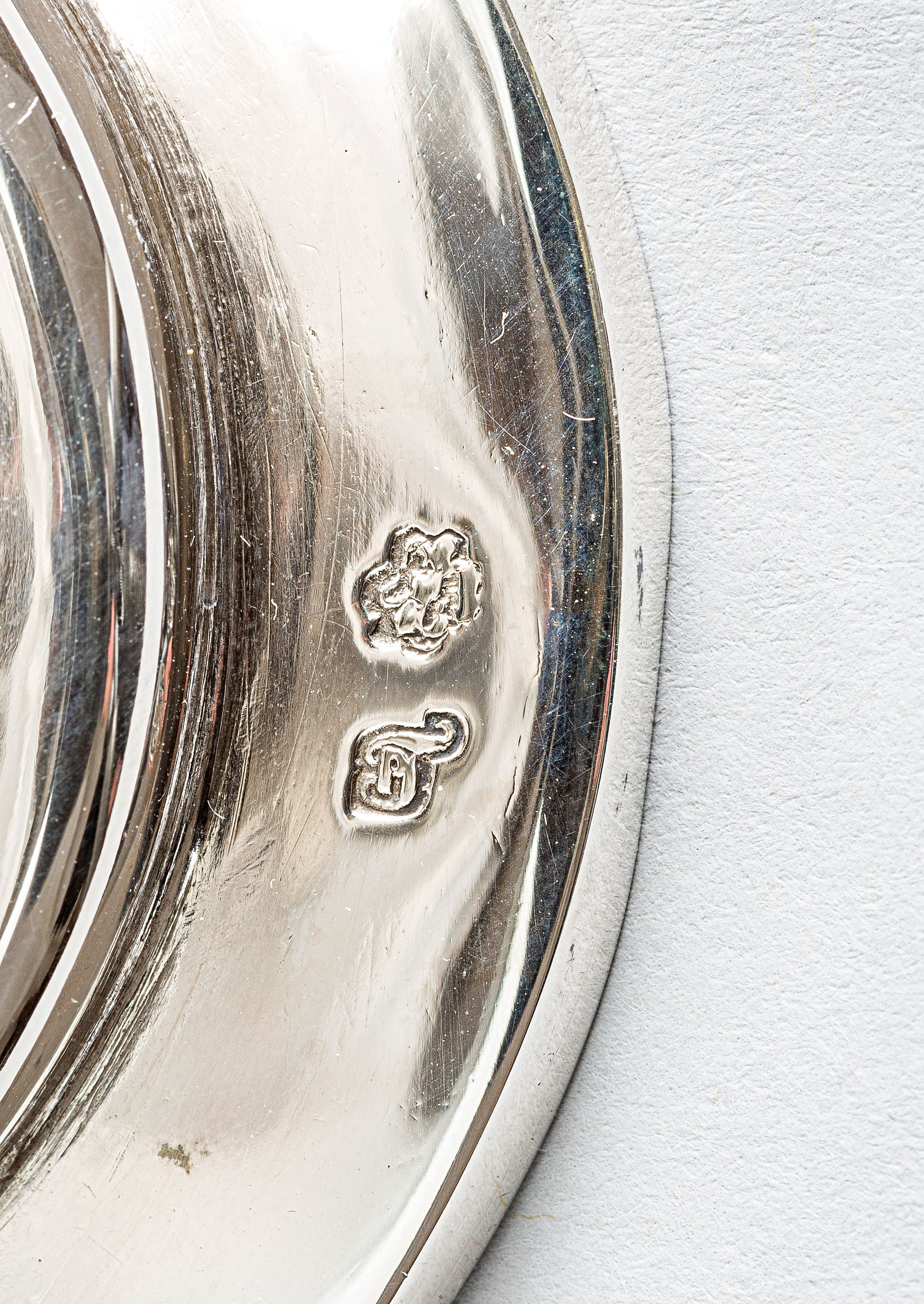
Theilgaard's master stamp (below) on a challice in Særslev Church. The other stamp is Odense's coat of arms.

Poul Jensen Theilgaard (1765–1820) was a Danish goldsmith who ran his own workshop in Odense from 1795 to 1820.

== History ==
Poul Jensen Theilgaard was born in 1765 in Fredericia. His parents were goldsmith Jens Nielsen Theilgaard, and Maren Hansdatter Bull. His father's workshop would later be continued by his younger brother Niels Jensen Theilgaard (1782‑1830). Another brother, Hans Buhl Theilgaard (1769‑1811), would also become a master goldsmith in Odense.

Poul Jensen Theilgaard was an apprentice in Peder Jørgen's workshop in Odense from 1780 to 1785.

== Career ==
Theilgaard worked in Oeder Jørgensen's workshop until at least July 1787. He may then have spent a few years as a journeyman. He latere worked for goldsmith Rasmus Møller in Odense. On 22 August 1792, Theilgaard was married to Møller's youngest daughter Maren. Prior to the wedding, Møller had arranged for Theilgaard to be admitted to the Goldsmith's Guild in Odense. His masterpiece was approved on 14 August 1792. Their first child was born kist two weeks after the wedding.

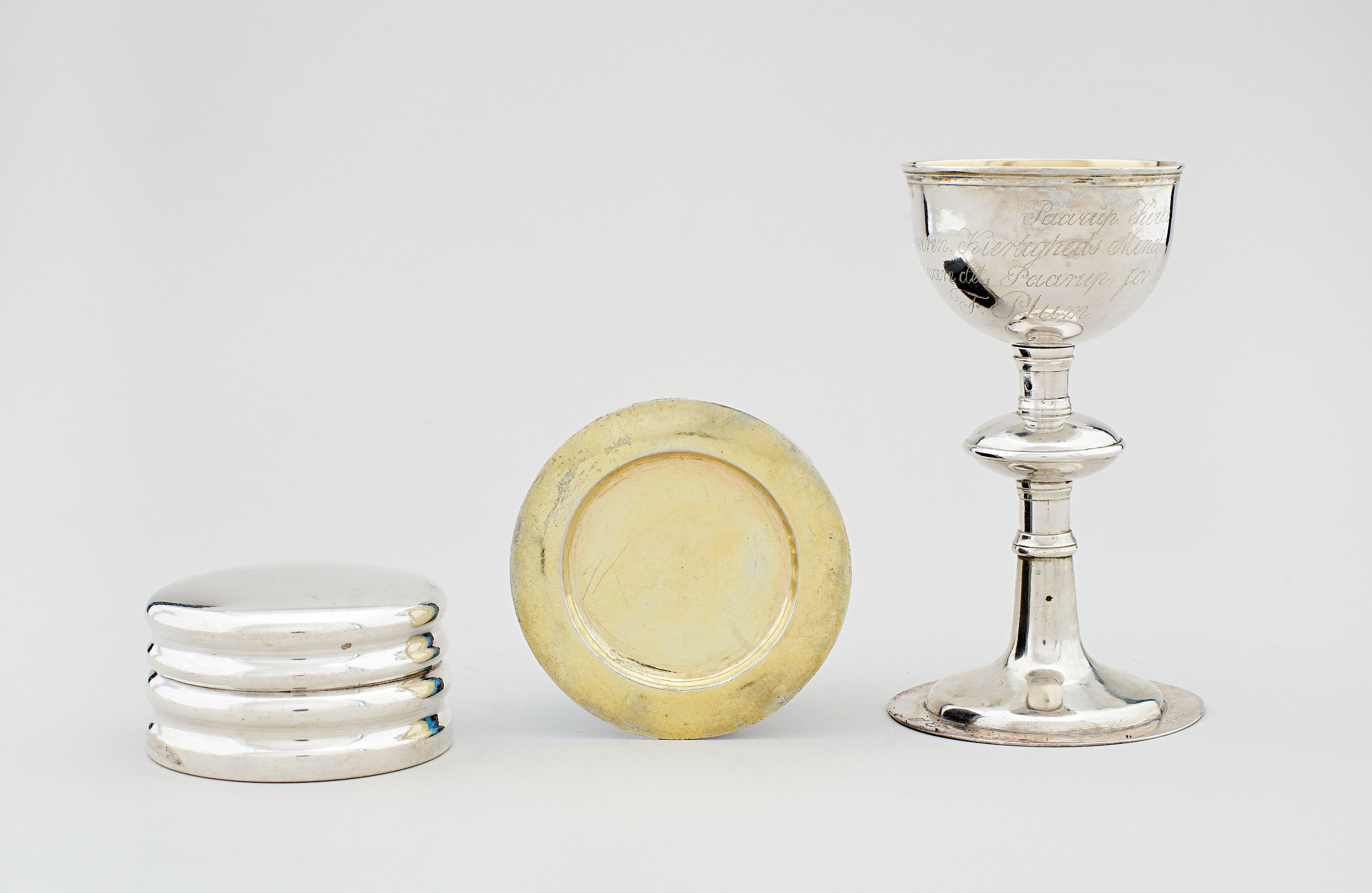
A so-called sygesæt created by Theilgaard for Slrslev Church in 1819.

Theilgaard worked for his father-in-law for a few more years. On 7 April 1795, he took citizenship as a goldsmith in Odense and established his own workshop. On 17 July 1794, he had bought a property in Korsgade (No. 188 in Western Quarter, now Vestergade 4) By 1801, Theilgaard employed four goldsmiths and two apprentices.

15 goldsmiths were educated in Theilgaard's workshop between 175 and his death in 1820 These included his son Tasmus Møller Theilgaard and nephew Jens Buhl Theilgaard.
