= Wedding of Gustav, Crown Prince of Sweden, and Sophia Magdalena =

1766 royal wedding

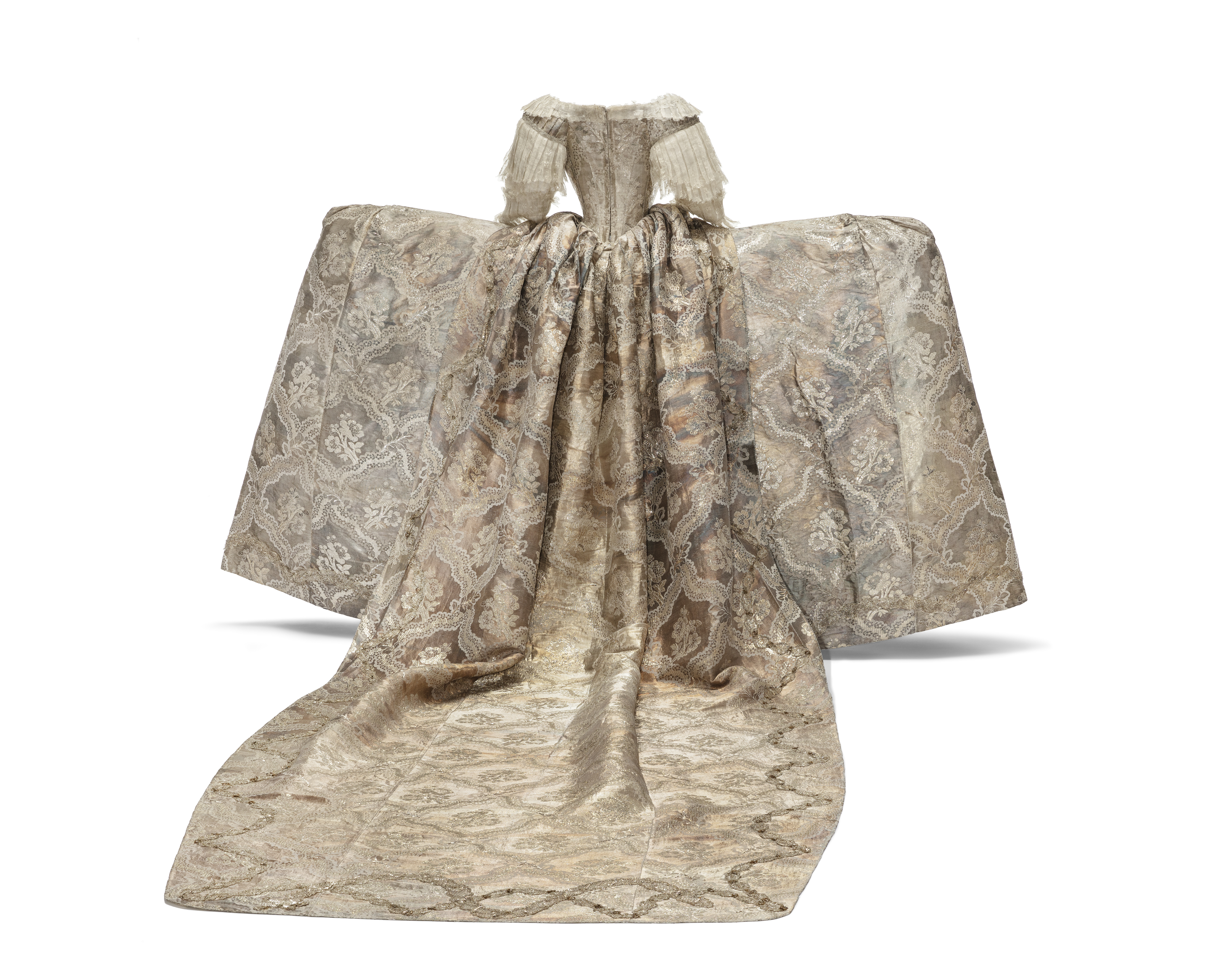
The wedding costume of Sophia Magdalena, Livrustkammaren

The wedding between Crown Prince Gustav, later Gustav III of Sweden, and Princess Sophia Magdalena of Denmark took place on November 4, 1766 at The Royal Palace.

== The arrangement ==
The bridal couple were twenty years old when they married, but they had been engaged since 1751, when they were only five years old. In April 1766 the agreement of the engagement was made public at the same time in both Sweden and Denmark. The annunciation was celebrated with festivities at both courts, and the public greeted the news with ovations. Behind the engagement were hopes of making the bonds between Sweden and Denmark stronger, and to put the disagreements to an end.

== A first wedding ceremony ==
A first wedding ceremony had taken place between the princess and a deputy groom, according to tradition, in Christiansborg Palace church in the beginning of October. This was almost like a legal act, where the terms that had been agreed between the royal families were confirmed.

== The wedding ==
When the wedding couple had been dressed the groom was escorted to the king's chamber and the bride to the queen's. The groom then walked in procession accompanied by his father and his brothers to escort the bride to The Royal Chapel where the ceremony took place. After the wedding ceremony, at ten at night, the newly weds had supper in the Hall of State, followed by dancing. When the dancing was over the princess was escorted to her chambers where she was denuded by the queen and the prince's sister. At the same time Gustav was dressed in his nights robes. He was then escorted to the princess by his father the king, his brothers, and his courtiers.
