= Valnæsgård =

Manor house and estate in southeastern Denmark

Valnæsgaard
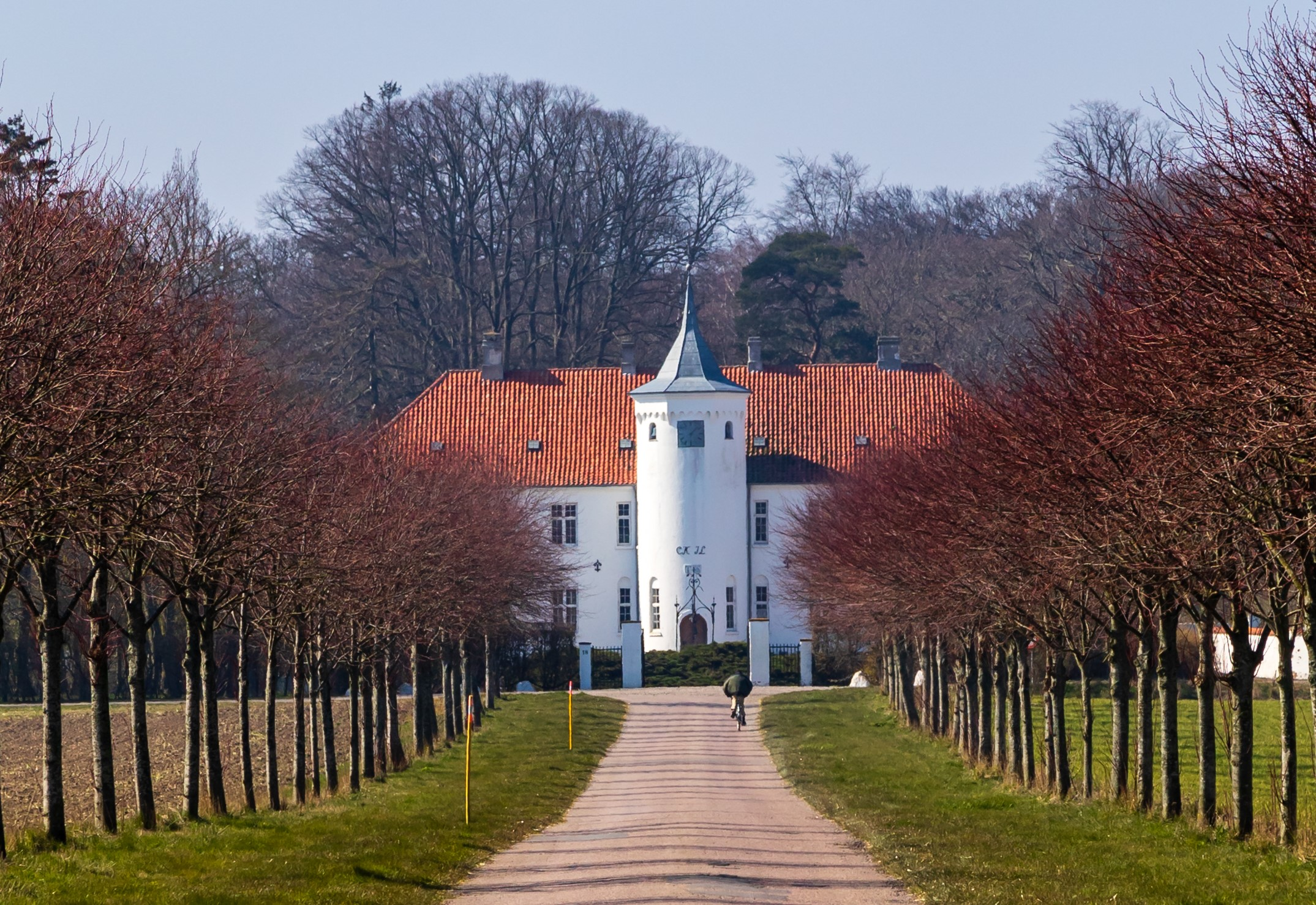

General information
- Location: Valnæsvej 18.a 4840 Nørre Alslev, Denmark
- Coordinates: 54°56′14″N 11°44′35″E
- Completed: 1910
- Client: Hans Tersling

Valnæsgård, formerly Egensegaard, is a manor house and estate located on the northwestern tip of Falster, 20 km northwest of Nykøbing Falster in southeastern Denmark.

== History ==
The farm Egensegaard traces its history back to the 13th century and was then owned by the Crown. In the beginning of the 18th century it was included in Falster Cavalry District. In 1766, Falster Cavalry District was divided into estates and sold at public auction. Valnæsgaard was acquired by the merchant Hans Bergeshagen Hincheldey. The manor comprised 55 tønder hartkorn of land and its tenant farms an additional 641 tønder hartkorn of land. In 1795, Hincheldey renamed the estate Valnæsgård in connection with passing it to his son Edvard Hincheldey. Edvard Hincheldey sold many of the tenant farms back to the Crown. The rest of the estate was in 1806 sold at public auction. The buyer was Frantz Thestrup. His brother Peter Thestrup was later made a co-owner of the estate. In 1835, Valnæsgård was once again sold at public auction. The new owner was Heinrich Hansen. He initiated extensive land reclamation projects to increase the size of the estate.

Heinrich Hansen's widow in 1874 sold Valnæsgård to Carl Wilhelm Grandjean Hansen. In 1899, he sold it to the merchant Alexander Andersen. Over the following decades, Valnæsgård changed hands a number of times. It was owned by Count Christopher Adam Valdemar Knuth for a time.

In 1932, Valnæsgård was acquired by Th. Fleron Dahl, whose father, Christian S. Dahl, took it over just two years later. In 1947, he ceded it to a limited company managed by Th. Fleron Dahl.

== Architecture ==
The current two-storey main building was constructed in the Neoclassical style on the foundations of the old main building by architect Thorvald Gundestrup (1869-1931) in 1910.A central tower projects from the facade of the building.

== List of owners ==
- ( –1766) The Crown
- (1766–1795) Hans Bergeshagen Hincheldey
- (1795–1806) Edvard Hincheldey
- (1806–1835) Frants Thestrup
- (1808–1835) Peter Thestrup
- (1835–1862) Heinrich Hansen
- (1862–1874) Enkefru Hansen
- (1874–1899) C. V. Grandjean Hansen
- (1899–1903) Alexander Andersen
- (1903–1918) Christopher Adam Valdemar Knuth
- (1918) Steen Giebelhausen
- (1918–1922) J. Diderichsen
- (1922–1930) L. du Plessis de Richelieu
- (1930–1932) E. Lauesen
- (1932–1934) Th. Fleron Dahl
- (1934–1947) Christian S. Dahl
- (1947– ) Valnæsgaard A/S
