= Harboe Meulengracht =

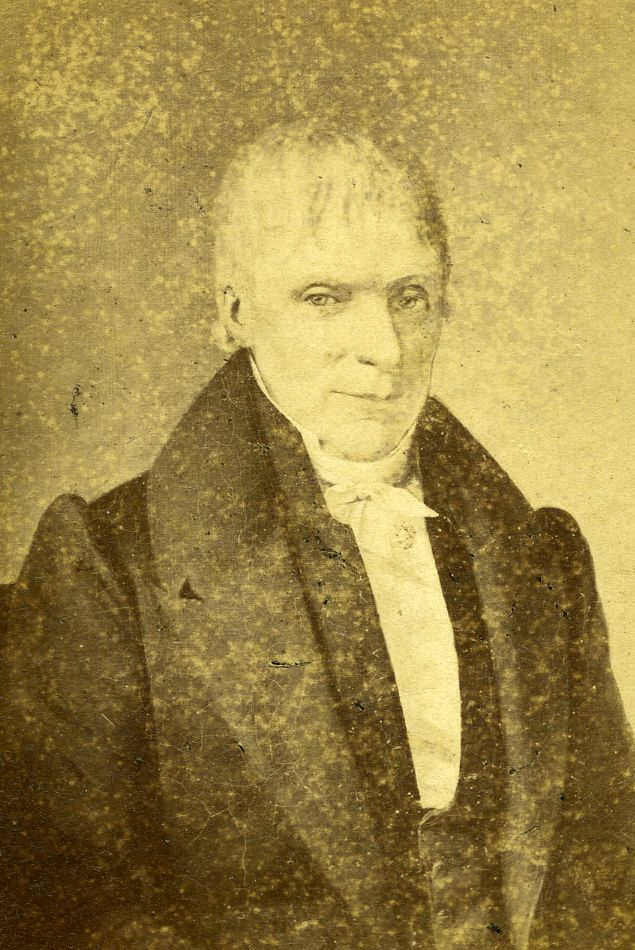
- Harboe Meulengracht c. 1810
- Born: 10 February 1767; Aarhus, Denmark
- Died: 27 May 1853 (aged 86); Aarhus, Denmark

Harboe Galthen Meulengracht (10 February 1767 – 27 May 1853) was a Danish merchant and shipowner in Denmark who was appointed to the Danish Supreme Court and was purveyor to the royal household.

== Biography ==
Meulengracht was born in Aarhus to Lars Christian Meulengracht and Marie Madsdatter Brøchner Galthen. He had two brothers, Mads Galthen Meulengracht and NN Meulengracht.

He grew up in the Aarhus Mill, located at Vester Allé where Mølleparken is placed nowadays, which was owned by his parents. In 1769, when Harboe was 2 years old, his father committed suicide by drowning himself in the mill pond due to economic problems.

Haboe worked as a trader in the ironmongery business, partnering with skipper Peder Larsen. In 1792, he married Maren Jensdatter Schmidt, a daughter of a local merchant, and in 1794 Peder Larsen married the sister to Meulengracht's wife, Dorothea Sophie Schmidt (1776-1850). That same year, at the age of 27, Harboe obtained citizenship to Aarhus and the two brother-in-laws ended their business partnership as well.

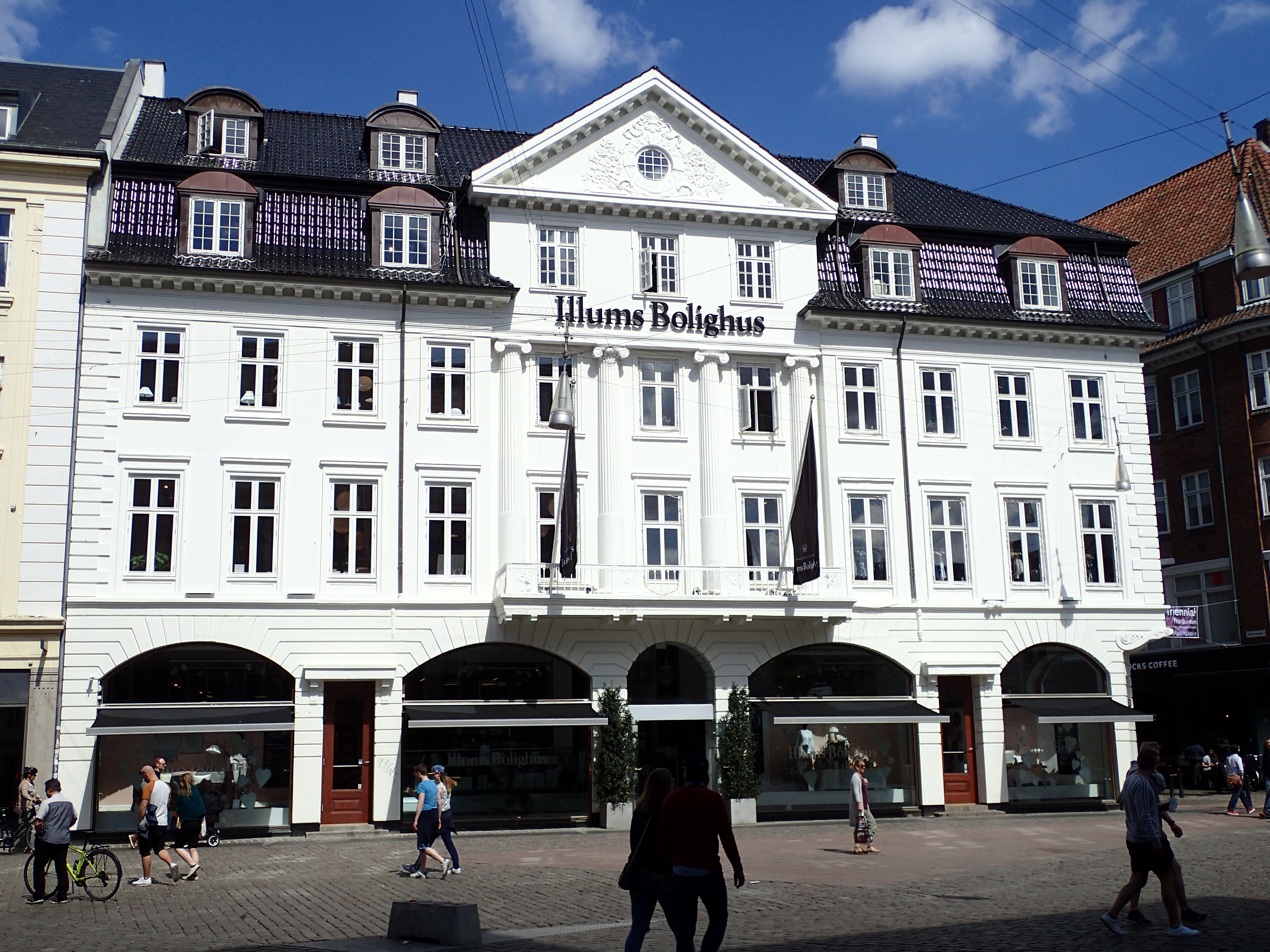
"Det Hvide Palæ", showpiece of the Meulengracht Complex

Meulengracht branched into international shipping, including Brazil and the Greenland whaling industry, and in 1809, he financed the construction of the Badstuegade 1H warehouse. Whale oil was used for street lighting in those days and it could be a most profitable business. The Napoleonic Wars in Europe, and Denmark, put a damper on the economies and trading and in 1816 Meulengracht lost a ship in the North Sea. Overall, however, his business went so well that in the same year he sold his shop and house in Vestergade and moved into a brand new, most expensive and impressive mansion. This mansion was the now listed Det Meulengrachtske Palæ (The Meulengracht Mansion), also known as Det Hvide Palæ (The White Mansion), at the central square of at Lille Torv. Originally, however, the mansion was yellow and with only three floor counts, and a roof, not the four of today. The mansion was expanded in 1840, 1860 and 1907, and now presents itself in the architectural Empire style. Soon after the Meulengracht family moved into their new mansion at Lille Torv 2, it became a place to visit for the bourgeoisie and well-to-do socialites, including Danish royalty. Especially King Christian VIII, King Frederik II, Prince Ferdinand, Princess Caroline and Countess Danner frequently stayed there.

Meulengracht's business became one of the largest in Aarhus and Harboe co-founded Kronprindsen's Klub (The Crown Prince's Club), a literary debate club for royalty and local members of the upper class, of which Meulengracht became an honorary member. Harboe Meulengracht initiated a lineage of prominent businessmen, politicians and land owners in Aarhus which lasted into the early 20th century.

Harboe fathered 10 children, including Lars Christian Meulengracht (1793-1836) who later came to take over his father's business and Dorothea Sophie Schmidt (1797-1881) who married Johannes Friis (1797-1877).
