= A Street Scene in the Dog Days =

1832 painting by Wilhelm Marstrand

- En gadescene fra Hundedagene (Danish)
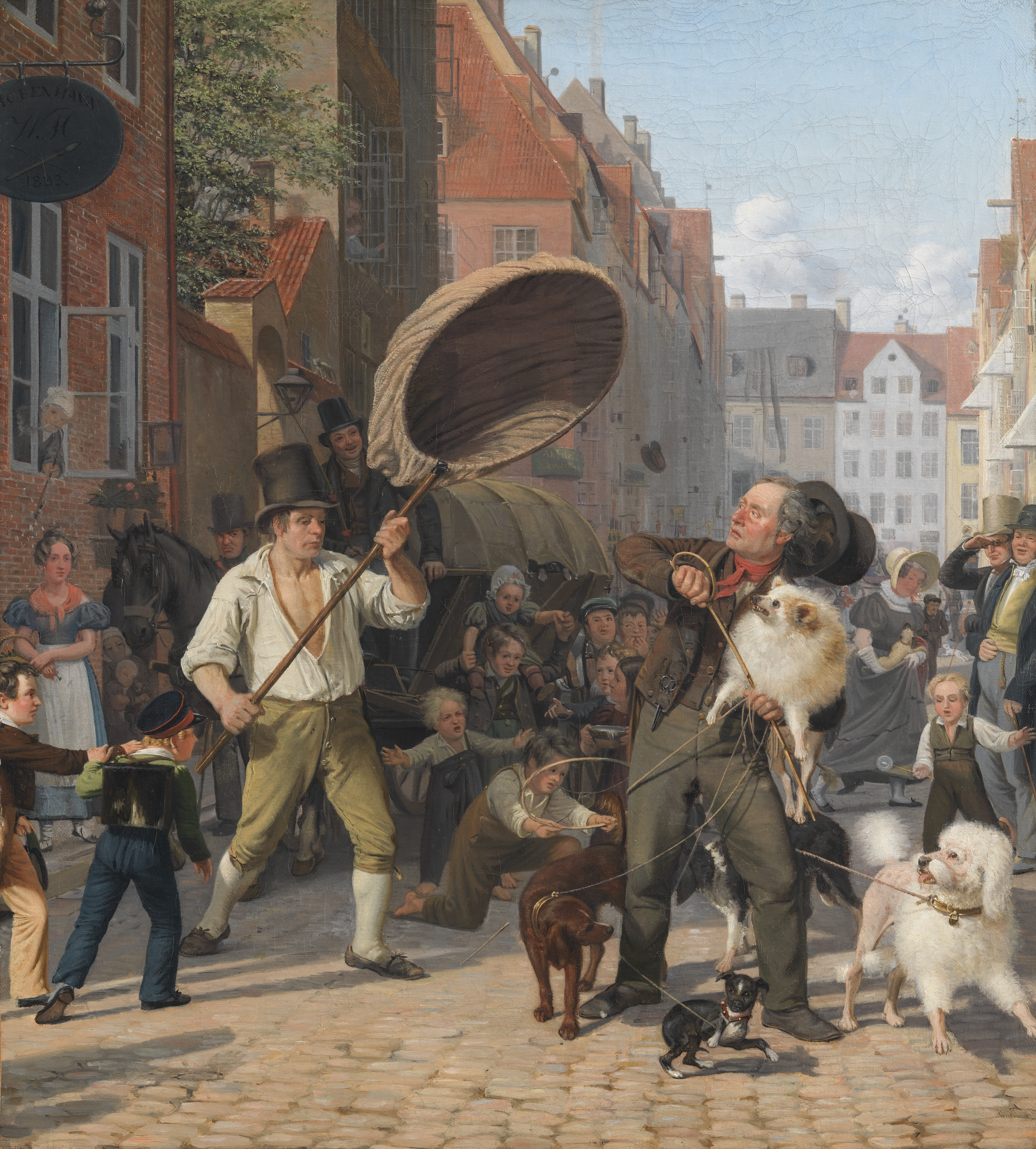
- Artist: Wilhelm Marstrand
- Year: 1832
- Medium: oil on canvas
- Dimensions: 58 cm × 52,5 cm (23 in × 207 in)
- Location: National Gallery of Denmark, Copenhagen

A Street Scene in the Dogdays (Danish: En gadescene fra hundedagene) is an 1832 oil on canvas genre painting by Wilhelm Marstrand, depicting a dog catcher at work in the streets of Copenhagen. The painting is now in the collection of the National Gallery of Denmark.

== Description ==
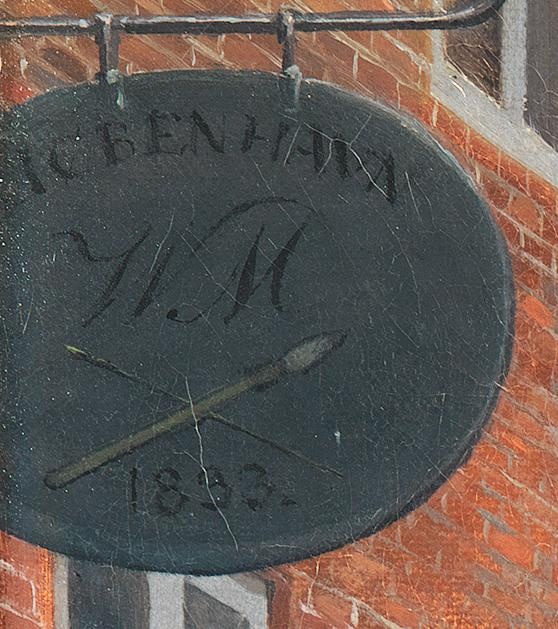
arstrand's signature seen on a detail of the sign in the upper left corner of the painting.

According to his contemporary, Niels Laurits Høyen, Marstrand's painting depicts an amusing intermezzo between a dog catcher and a dog trainer: the former is trying to catch a stray dog, but the dog trainer mistakenly believes that he is targeting his flock of pedigree dogs and sets in a counterattack in their defence. Jesper Svenningsen has observed that the painting may also be perceived as containing an element of political satire; "One could certainly choose to interpret the scene to say that the well-bred are protected while those of less noble stock are more at risk – that in class society, we are not equal in the eyes of the law".

Marstrand has incorporated his own signature in the motif by placing his initials and the date on a shop sign in the upper left corner of the painting. It is accompanied by two crossed brushes.

== History ==
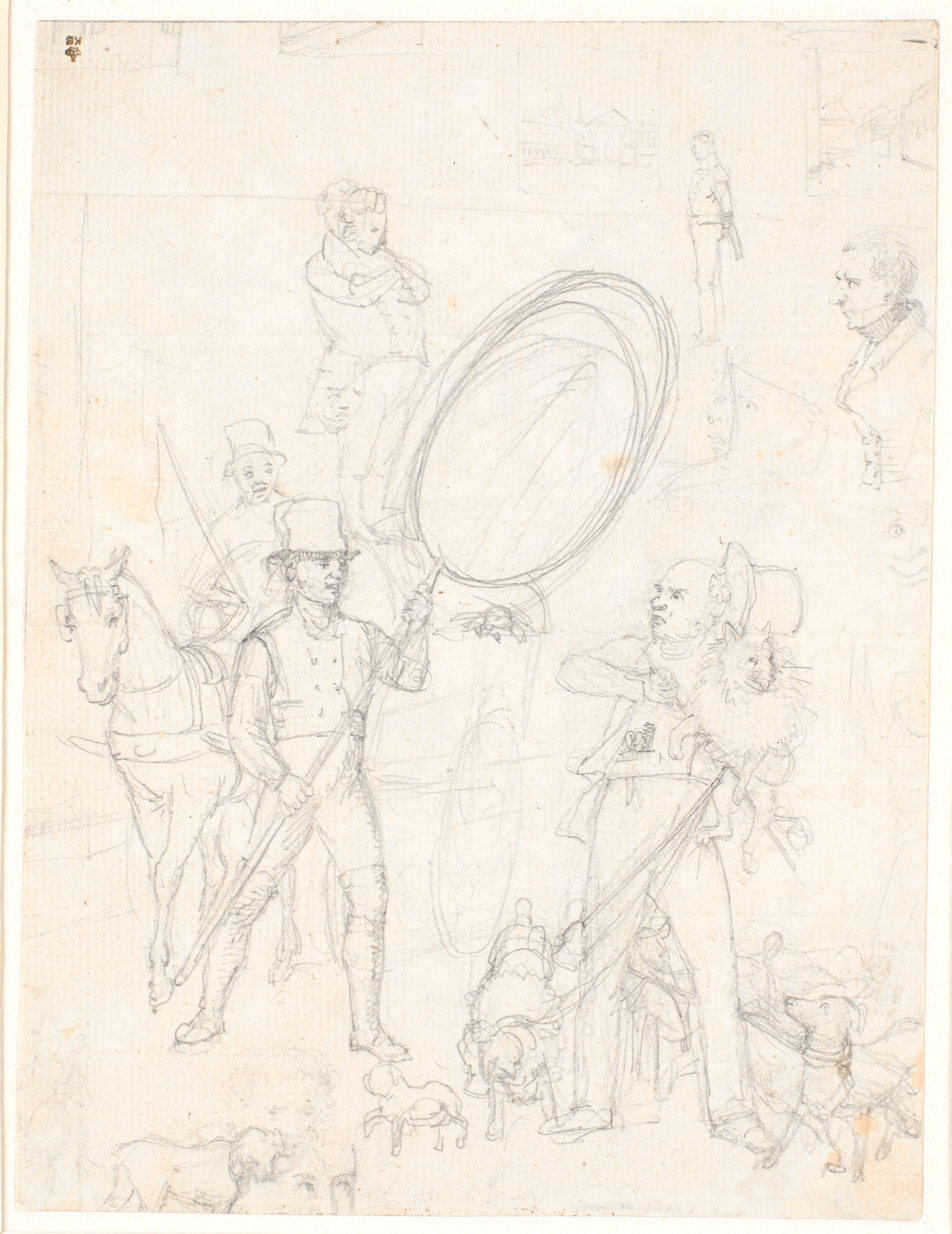
One of Marstrand's sketches for the painting.

The painting was painted by Marstrand in 1832 as one of his first street scenes. It was exhibited at the 1833 Charlottenborg Spring Exhibition. By then it had already been sold to wine merchant Christian Waagepetersen.

Waagepetersen was a friend of Marstrand's father. Marstrands would later receive three commissions from him.

The painting was later owned by Henriette Albertine Gottschalck. In 1909, in accordance with her will, it was donated to the National Gallery of Denmark.

== Exhibitions ==
- Marstrand. Den store fortæller, Nivaagaards Malerisamling (Jan 2022 – Jun 2022)
- Marstrand. Den store fortæller, Skovgaard Museum, Viborg (Sep 2021 – Jan 2022)
- Marstrand. Den store fortæller, Ribe Kunstmuseum (Jun 2021 – Sep 2021)
- Marstrand. Den store fortæller, Fuglsang Kunstmuseum (Oct 2020 – Jan 2021)
- "Danish Golden Age, Petit Palais, Paris (Apr 2020 – Aug 2020)
- Dansk Guldalder: Verdenskunst mellem to katastrofer Sølvgade (Aug 2019 – Dec 2019)
- Dansk guldålder / The Danish Golden Age Nationalmuseum, Stockholm (Feb 2019 – Jul 2019=
