= Carl Ferdinand Allen =

Danish historian and professor

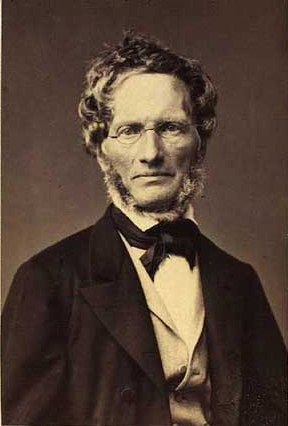
Carl Ferdinand Allen

Carl Ferdinand Allen (April 23, 1811 – December 27, 1871) was a Danish historian and professor.

== Biography ==
Carl Ferdinand Allen was born in Copenhagen, Denmark. He was the son of Robert A. Allen and Karen Olsdatter. In 1826 he entered Metropolitanskolen. He studied at the University of Copenhagen and received a cand. theo. degree in 1836. He spent three years (1845-1848) researching at the archives of England, France, the Netherlands, Italy and Germany; upon completion of this task, he returned to Denmark. In 1851 he became a lecturer at the University of Copenhagen and, in 1862, a professor of history and northern archaeology.

His principal work was De Tre Nordiske Rigers Historie, 1497-1536, ("The History of the Three Northern Kingdoms," five volumes, 1864–72). He wrote the work following years of examinations of the archives of European nations.

Allen's Haandbog i Fædrelandets Historie ("Handbook in the History of the Fatherland"), from 1855, dealt with Danish history spanning from the Viking Ages until his lifetime. In that work he argued that the Vikings had a fatherland feelings and that democracy existed in Denmark during the Viking Ages. In Om Sprog og Folke-Eiendommelighed i Hertugdømmet Slesvig eller Sønderjylland ("About Language and Singularity in the Duchy of Schleswig or Sonderjylland"), Allen depicted the Germans in a negative way and accused them of having intrinsic urge to expand and to dominate other peoples.

He died at Frederiksberg and was buried at Solbjerg Park Cemetery.
