= Amalie Münster =

Danish courtier, translator and poet

Amalie Münster (October 31, 1767 – September 3, 1814) was a Danish courtier, translator and poet.

== Biography ==
Amalie Isabella Johanne Charlotte Münster was a leading culture personality at the Danish Royal court. She was educated at Grolland in Bremen. In 1787, she married Councilor, Count («Reichsgraf») Georg Werner August Ditrich von Münster-Meinhovel (1751–1801). When her husband died in 1801, Amalie Münster continued to live in Vienna before moving to Kiel and later to Copenhagen. She was the lady in waiting of Princess Juliane Sophie of Denmark 1805-09 and then of Princess Caroline of Denmark. She was an acquaintance of Danish poets Jens Baggesen and Adam Oehlenschläger, whose poems she translated. She published her own poems, «Amaliens poetische Versuche» (1796). Amalie Münster died at Frederiksberg Palace in 1814,.

== Other sources ==
- Dansk biografisk Lexikon / XII. Bind. Münch - Peirup
