= Else Fenger =

Danish businesswoman (1737–1811)

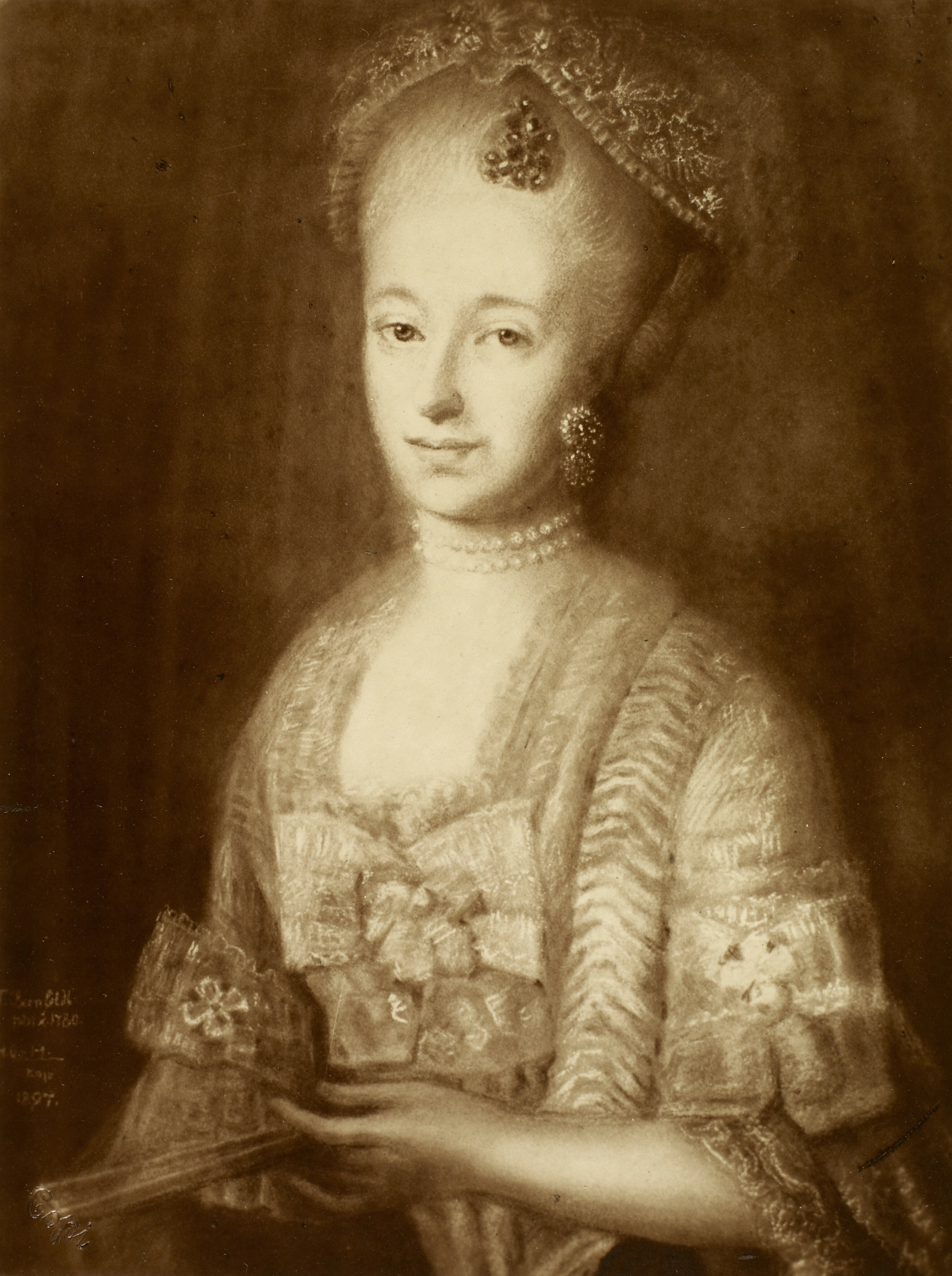
Else Brock Fenger (1780)

Else Fenger (18 June 1737 – 27 January 1811) was a Danish businessperson. She managed a soap factory and company Borre & Fenger in Copenhagen after the death of her spouse Peter Fenger (d. 1774). She was one of few women in Denmark of her time to manage a major company.

== Biography ==
Else Brock was born on 18 June 1737 in Randers, the daughter of merchant Rasmus Brock (1695–1752) and Marie Kirstine Andersdatter Knudsen (1710–45). She was the younger sister of businessman Niels Brock.

She married Peter Fenger on 17 June 1758 in the Church of Our Saviour in Copenhagen. Her spouse was a major industrialist, but at the time of his death, his partner Peter Borre had retired and Fenger had mismanaged the factory to a point that it was threatened by ruin and the family's palatial home in Copenhagen near public auction. Else Fenger managed to get the company back on its feet and keep the family's luxurious living standard and became a well known and respected business figure. Many anecdotes are told about her.
