= Alexia de Lode =

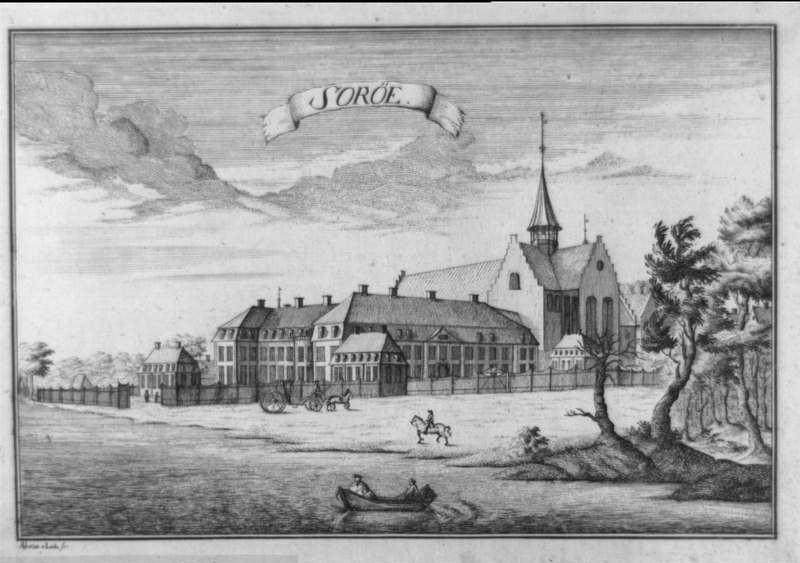
Alexia de Lode's depiction of Sorø

Anna Alexia Constantia de Lode, also Lodde, (1737–1765) was a Danish engraver who practised copper-plate etching. She is remembered in particular for her many depictions of Danish towns and cities which she prepared as illustrations for Erik Pontoppidan's Den danske Atlas (1763).

== Biography ==
Born in Copenhagen in early 1737 and baptized on 15 May, Anna Alexia Constantia de Lode was the daughter of the painter and engraver Gustav de Lode the Elder (1694–1742) and his wife Anna Maria Andersdatter (1698–1766). The youngest of the family's three children, her brothers were the engraver Gustav de Lode the Younger (1720–1752) and the painter and engraver Odvardt Helmoldt von Lode (1726–1757).

Raised in a family of copper-plate etchers, in 1760 de Lode created images to illustrate Edward Moore's Fabler for det smukke Kiøn (1760), the Danish version of his Fables for the Female Sex which was translated by S.C. Stanley. Based on those by the French engraver Simon François Ravenet in the original English edition, her 10 signed illustrations depict landscapes and animal scenes, all of which bear her signature. She also illustrated the book's cover. The book's other illustrations are in a rather different style and were probably created by an unknown engraver.

From 1763 to 1767, she created numerous engravings to illustrate the Danish towns and cities included in Pontoppidan's Danske Atlas (Danish Atlas). They appear to have been inspired by Marcus Tuscher's illustrations of Frederic Louis Norden's Voyage d'Egypte et de Nubie (1755).

Alexia de Lode died in Copenhagen on 18 December 1765. She was only 28.
