= Magdalene Bärens =

Danish artist (1737–1808)

Magdalene Margrethe Bärens
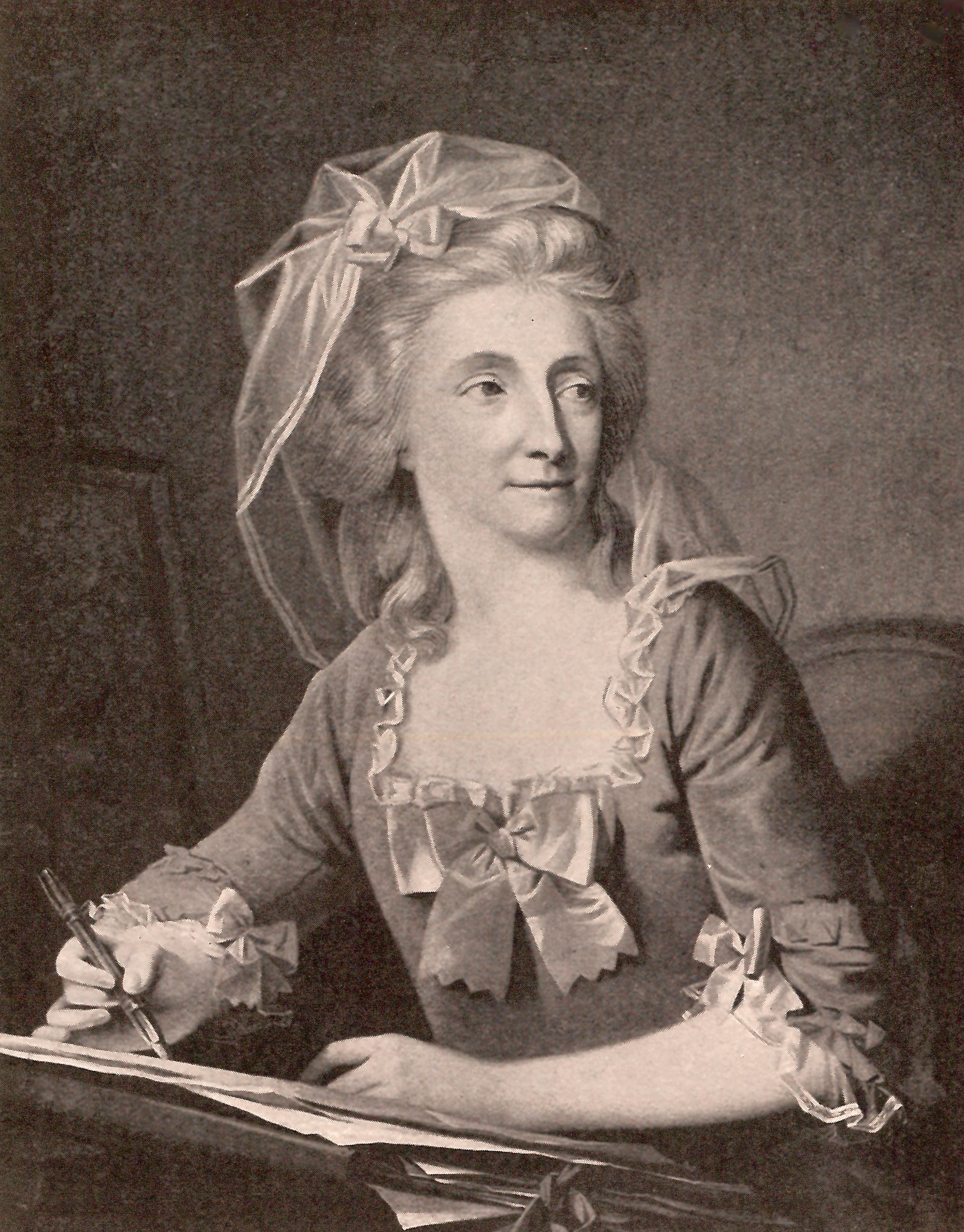
- Magdalene Margrethe Bärens
- Born: Magdalene Margrethe Schäffer; 30 September 1737; Copenhagen, Denmark
- Died: 6 June 1808 (aged 70); Copenhagen, Denmark
- Known for: Painting
- Spouse: Johan Georg Bärens (m. 1761)

Magdalene Margrethe Bärens (née Schäffer) (30 September 1737 – 6 June 1808) was a Danish still-life painter known for her paintings of flowers. She was one of the first professional female artists in Denmark, and the first woman to be admitted into the Royal Danish Academy of Fine Arts.

Bärens primarily painted flowers, together with birds and insects, almost exclusively in gouache. She was uniquely concerned with ensuring the flowers were depicted with botanical accuracy and therefore preferred a muted, earthy color palette. The realism of her paintings was praised by botanists, and gained her a reputation as the "first and greatest Danish flower painter".

== Early life ==
Magdalene Margrethe Schäffer was born on 30 September 1737 to Elisabeth Hochkirch and Johann Hermann Schäffer, a respected horse expert. In his role as the stable master for the Royal Household of Denmark, her father assisted the sculptor Jacques Saly in illustrating the anatomy of horses.

When Magdalene displayed an early talent for drawing, her father encouraged her to develop her skills. Her mother, however, was more traditional. At the time, the education of women almost exclusively was the concern of their mothers, and Magdalene's mother insisted on training her to be a frugal and well-prepared housewife. Magdalene did not receive a formal education or training as an artist, but through her father's connections was able to discuss her work with Saly and the painter Hans Clio. She stated that Jacques Saly had the greatest influence on her artistic development, having taught her to observe the details of nature in the family's garden.

== Career ==
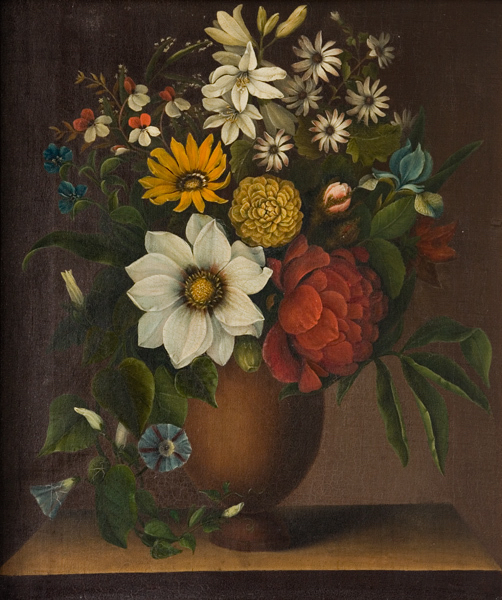
Vase med Blomster, gouache on paper mounted on copper

On 3 July 1761, she married the official Johan Georg Bärens at the age of 23. Although Johan Georg encouraged her painting, she initially stopped all artistic activity. Instead, she dedicated herself to her domestic role and their four children: Johan Hendrich (1761), Elisabeth Catharina (1762), Diedrich (1764), and Friedrich (1765). Eventually, encouraged by the painter Vigilius Erichsen, she resumed painting at the age of 40. In 1779, her paintings of flowers in gouache where presented to the Royal Danish Academy of Fine Arts without her knowledge, and in 1780, she became the first woman to be admitted to the academy. Bärens, however, never actively participated in the assembly of the academy.

Bärens painted still-life paintings, especially flowers, and was appointed royal flower-painter by dowager queen Juliana Maria. To be able to paint flowers during winter, she installed a green house. In 1783 she sent two paintings to Catherine the Great of Russia and was rewarded with a gold medal and 300 ducats.

After an English doctor failed to pay her one thousand rigsdaler for two of her paintings, she and her husband traveled to England. While there on a grant from the crown from 1788 to 1790, her work was viewed favorably and she gained popularity. However, competition from Mary Moser and strict customs laws prevented her from making a profit off of the trip and she was forced to return to Denmark after falling in debt; the original 1000 rigsdaler debt was not settled until 1802. After returning to Denmark, she unsuccessfully applied for a vacant position at the academy in 1795, and in 1796 for a residence at Charlottenborg Palace.

As a widow in 1802, she was given a pension. She died on 6 June 1808 in Copenhagen and was buried in the chapel of Christian's Church.
