= Christian Klingberg =

Danish lawyer

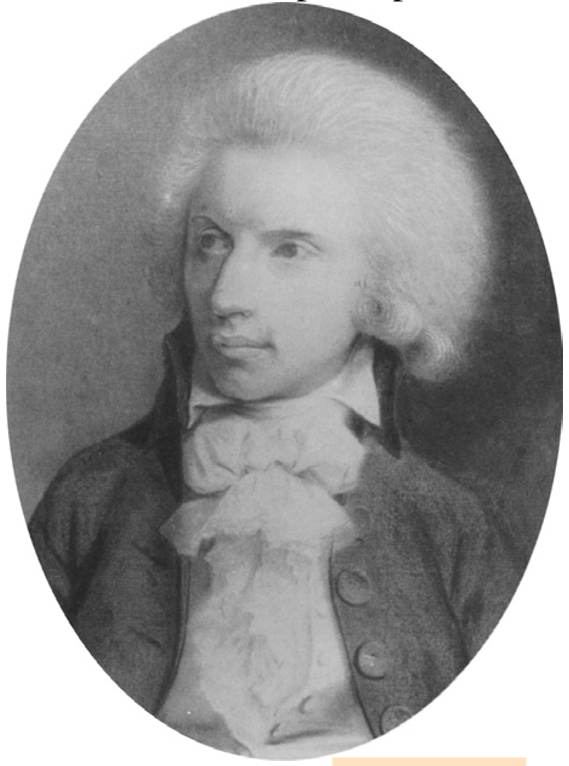
- Pastel portrait by of Christian Klingberg by Jens Juel, 1818
- Born: 16 December 1765; Copenhagen, Denmark
- Died: 9 February 1821 (aged 55); Copenhagen , Denmark
- Occupation: Lawyer

Christian Klingberg (16 December 1765 – 9 February 1821) was a Danish Supreme Court attorney and chief legal officer of the Danish Asiatic Company.

== Early life and education ==
Klingberg was born on 16 December 1765 in Copenhagen, the son of lottery inspector-general Jacob Klingberg (1719–82) and Karen Lund (1733–1806). He graduated from Frederiksborg Latin School in 1783 and earned a law degree (cand.jur.) from the University of Copenhagen in 1787.

== Career ==
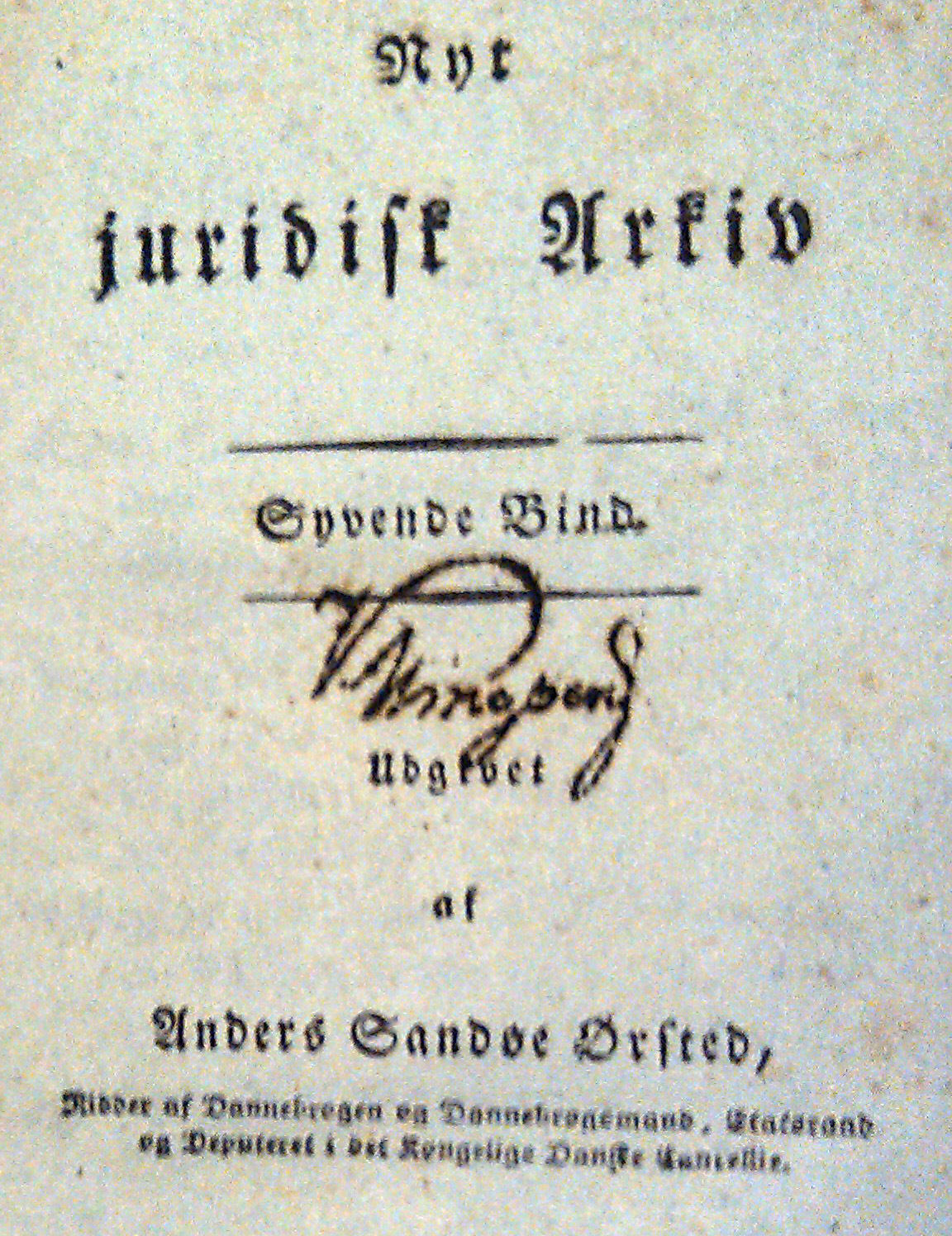
Christian Klingberg's signature on the title page of a volume of A.S. Ørsted's Nyt Juridisk Arkiv (7th volume, 1814).

He was a lawyer at the Hof- og Stadsret from 1791 and became a Supreme Court Attorney in 1792. This was within Denmark–Norway. He was in addition chief legal officer of the Danish Asia Company 1812–19 and briefly served as director of the Bank of Denmark in 1818. In 1813, he was designated as Supreme Court justice but never used this appointment.

Klingberg was recognized as one of the leading lawyers of his time and acted as defense attorney in a number of high-profile cases, for instance for Conrad Malte-Brun.

== Personal life ==
Klingberg married Lovise Elisabeth Klingberg (20 February 1772 – 13 February 1855), a daughter of Lauritz Klongberg (1728–95) and Catharina Elisabeth Schumacher (1745–92), on 28 May 1796 in the Holmen Church.

Klingberg died on 9 February 1821 in Copenhagen and is buried at Valsølille Cemetery.
