= 1871 in Denmark =

- Decades: 1850s; 1860s; 1870s; 1880s; 1890s
- See also: Other events of 1871; List of years in Denmark

Events from the year 1871 in Denmark.

== Incumbents ==
- Monarch – Christian IX
- Prime minister – Ludvig Holstein-Holsteinborg

== Events ==
January

- 2 January – The Stöðulög, laws on the constitutional standing of Iceland within the Danish realm, are passed.

May

- 2 May – The Skanderborg–Silkeborg railway line is inaugurated
- 5 October – Den Danske Landmandsbank, Hypothek- og Vexelbank i Kjøbenhavn, present-day Danske Bank, is founded.

August

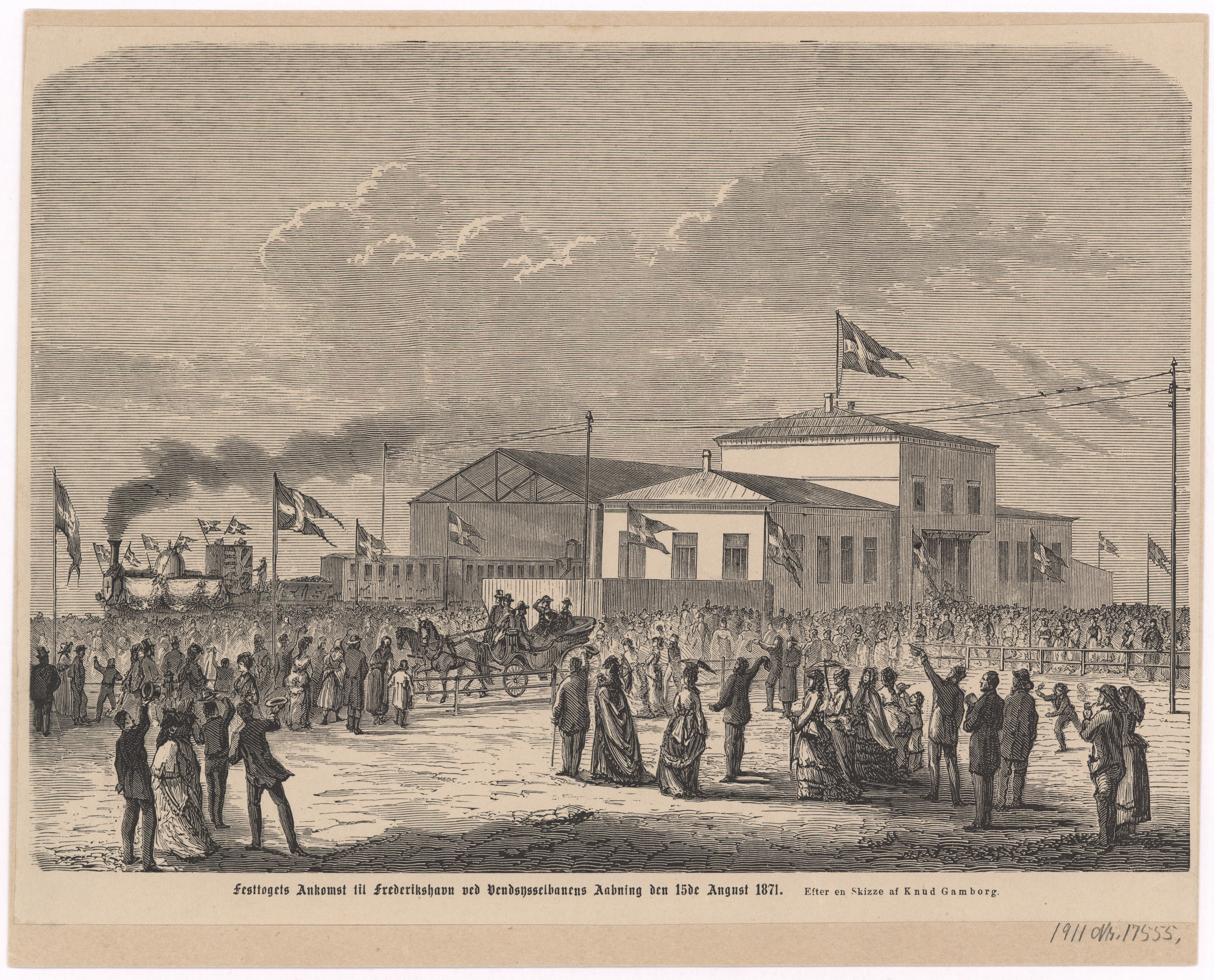
15 August: The first train arrives to Frederikshavn Station at the opening of the Vendsyssel Line.

- 15 August – The Vendsyssel Railway is inaugurated with the first train to Frederikshavn.
- 15 October – The Social Democratic party is founded by Louis Pio, Harald Brix and Paul Geleff.

November

- 8 November – At Lyksborg Slot, Princess Thyra gives birth to a daughter, conceived in a love affair with a cavalry lieutenant. The girl is adopted by a couple in Odense shortly after birth.

=== Date unknown ===
- The first private kindergarten in Denmark is established in Copenhagen by writer Erna Juel-Hansen. Kindergarten with public support are not seen until 1901.
- The Danish Women's Society, the world's oldest women's rights organization, is founded.

== Culture ==
=== Art ===
- Janus la Cour is awarded the Rhorvaldsen Exhibition Medal for the painting Aften ved Nemisøen.

== Births ==
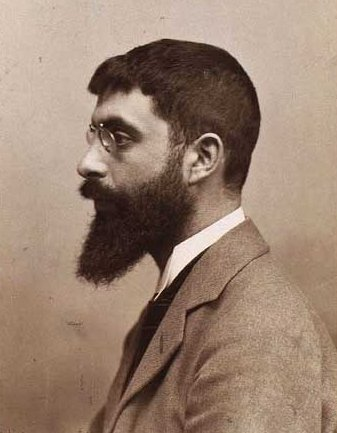
Mogens Ballin.

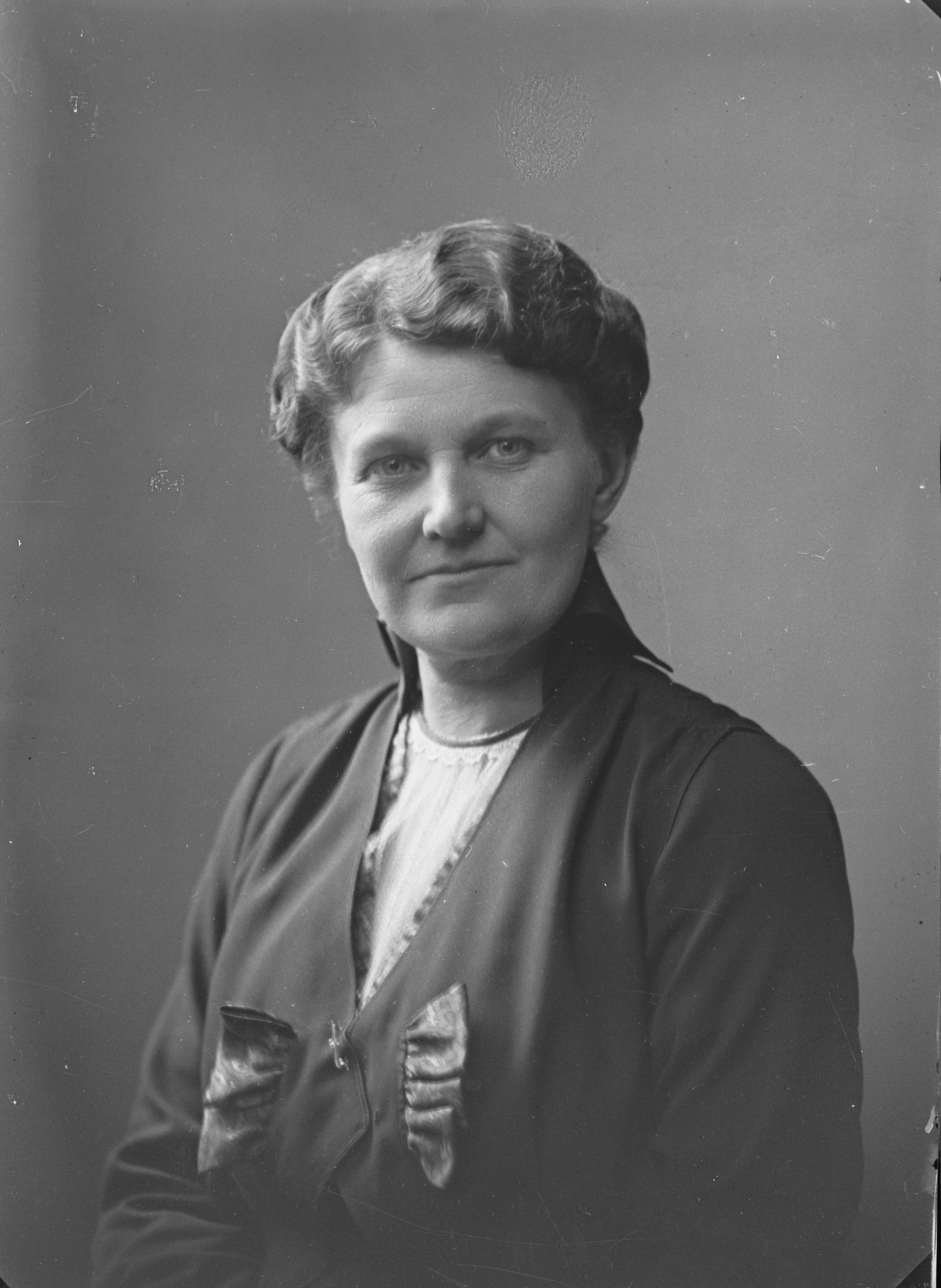
Ingeborg Suhr Mailand.

=== January–March ===
- 15 February – Martin Knudsen, physicist and researcher after whom the Knudsen gas state, the Knudsen number, and the Knudsen layer are named (died 1949)
- 20 March – Mogens Ballin, painter and silversmith (died 1914)

=== April–June ===
- 5 April – Søren Absalon Larsen, physicist active in the field of electroacoustics; the Larsen effect was named after him (died 1957)
- 13 June – Elna Munch, feminist, suffragist and politician, one of the three first women to be elected to the Danish parliament in 1918 (died 1945)
- 14 June – Jacob Ellehammer, politician (died 1946)
- 16 June – Ingeborg Suhr Mailand, educator (died 1969)

=== July–September ===
- 19 July – Lars Jørgen Madsen, multiple Olympic medalist in rifle shooting (died 1925)
- 29 July – August Paulsen, Danish-American businessman and philanthropist (died 1927)

=== October–December ===
- 2 November – Poul Heegaard, mathematician active in the field of topology, professor in mathematics at the University of Copenhagen 1910–1917, professor in mathematics at the University of Kristiania 1917–1941 (died 1948)
- 5 November – Susanne Lindberg, sports cyclist (died 1934)
- 12 November – Dagmar Hansen, cabaret singer and stage performer, Denmark's first pin-up girl (died 1959)
- 29 November – Arnold Busck, bookseller, company founder (died 1953)
- 10 December – Jens Christian Bay, Danish-American writer and librarian (died 1962)
- 14 December – Harald Moltke, nobleman, painter and author (died 1960)

== Deaths ==
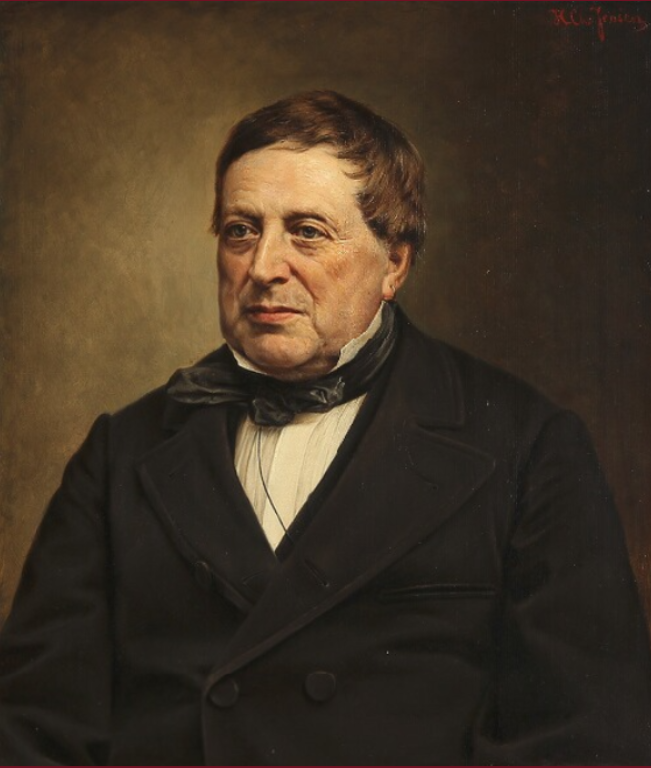
Abraham Marcus Hirschsprung.

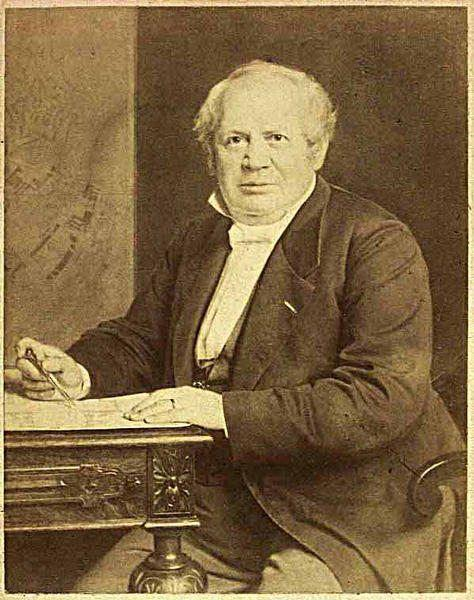
Niels Sigfred Nebelong.

=== January–March ===
- 2 January – Niels Kjærbølling, ornithological writer and lithographer, founder of Copenhagen Zoo (born 1806)
- 28 January – Thorgeir Guðmundsson, Icelandic-Danish clergy and publisher (born 1797)
- 1 March – Johan Henrik Nebelong, architect (born 1817)
- 19 March – Frederik Oxholm, colonial administrator (born 1801)
- 28 March – Johan Vilhelm Gertner, portrait painter (born 1818)

=== April–June ===
- 5 June – Erich Christian Werlauff, historian (born 1781)

=== July–September ===
- 21 August – Abraham Marcus Hirschsprung, businessman born 1793)

=== October–December ===
- 9 October – Niels Sigfred Nebelong, historicist-style architect, resident architect for the Danish lighthouse authority (born 1806)
- 14 October – Johan Frederik Møller, painter and photographer (born 1797)
- 15 October – Oscar O'Neill Oxholm, military officer and landowner (born 1809)
- 2 December – Moritz Unna, photographer (born 1811)
- 12 December – Henrik Rung, composer, conductor and vocal pedagogue (born 1807)
- 27 December – Carl Ferdinand Allen, historian (born 1811)
