= 1781 in Denmark =

- Decades: 1760s; 1770s; 1780s; 1790s; 1800s
- See also: Other events of 1781; List of years in Denmark

Events from the year 1781 in Denmark.

== Incumbents ==
- Monarch – Christian VII
- Prime minister – Ove Høegh-Guldberg

== Events ==
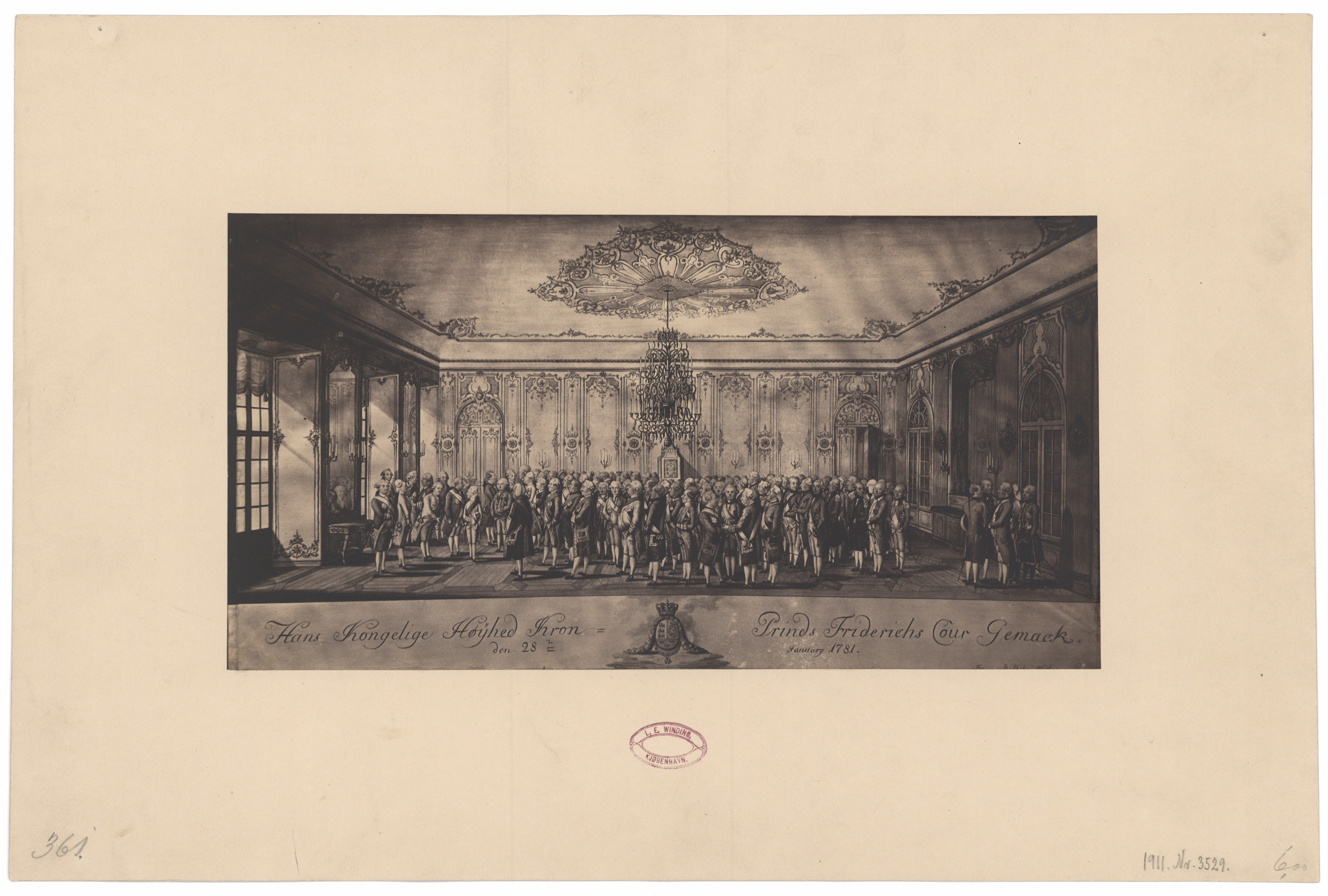
23 January – Hans Kongelige Høyhed Kron-Prinds Friderichs Cour Gemack.

- 18 June – The county of Lindenborg is established by Heinrich Carl von Schimmelmann from the manors of Lindenborg, Gudumlund, Vildmosegaard, Tiendegården, Henriksdal, Louisendal and Thoruphedegård.

Kilder

== Births ==
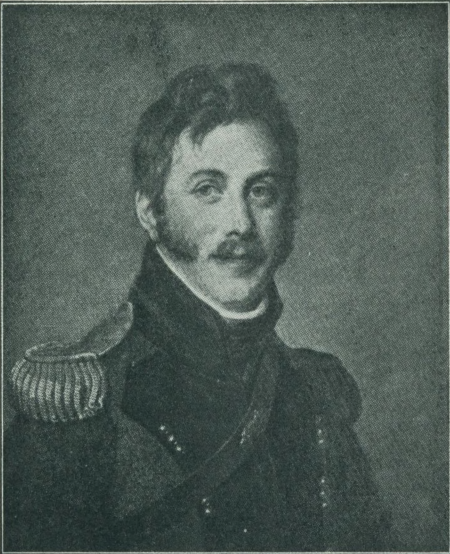
Andreas Buntzen.

- 2 January – Frederik Michael Ernst Fabritius de Tengnagel, military officer and landscape painter (died 1849)
- 12 June – Anne Marie Mangor, cookbook writer (died 1865)
- 2 July – Erich Christian Werlauff, historian (died 1871)
- 18 September – Andreas Buntzen, businessman (died 1830)
- 2 October – Bernt Wilhelm Westermann, businessman and insect collector (died 1868)
- 12 October – Ludvig Mariboe, Norwegian businessman, publisher and politician (died 1841)
- 16 December – Caspar Henrik Wolfsen, privateer and customs inspector (died 1836)

== Deaths ==
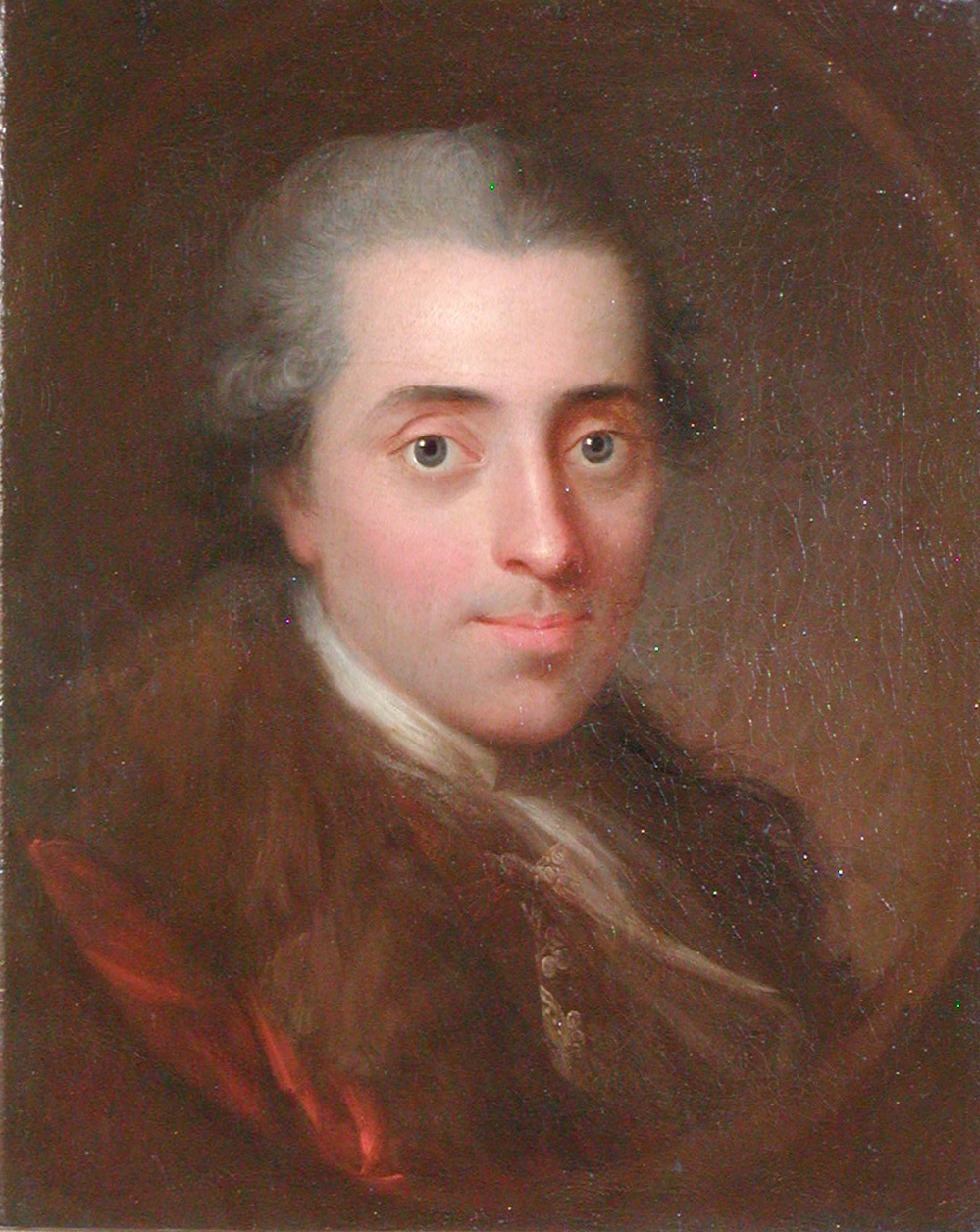
Johannes Rwald.

- 22 February – Anna Magdalena Godiche, publisher (born 1721)
- 17 March – Johannes Ewald, dramatist, poet (born 1743)
- 10 April – Reinhard Iselin, businessperson (born 1714 in Switzerland)
- 25 May – Frederik Horn, chief of police in Copenhagen and president of Hof- og Stadsretten (born 1708)
- 30 August – Georg David Anthon, architect (born 1714 in Germany)
- 25 December – Wolf Veit Christoph von Reitzenstein, county governor and headmaster (born 1810)
