= Kompagnistræde 11 =

Building in Copenhagen, Denmark

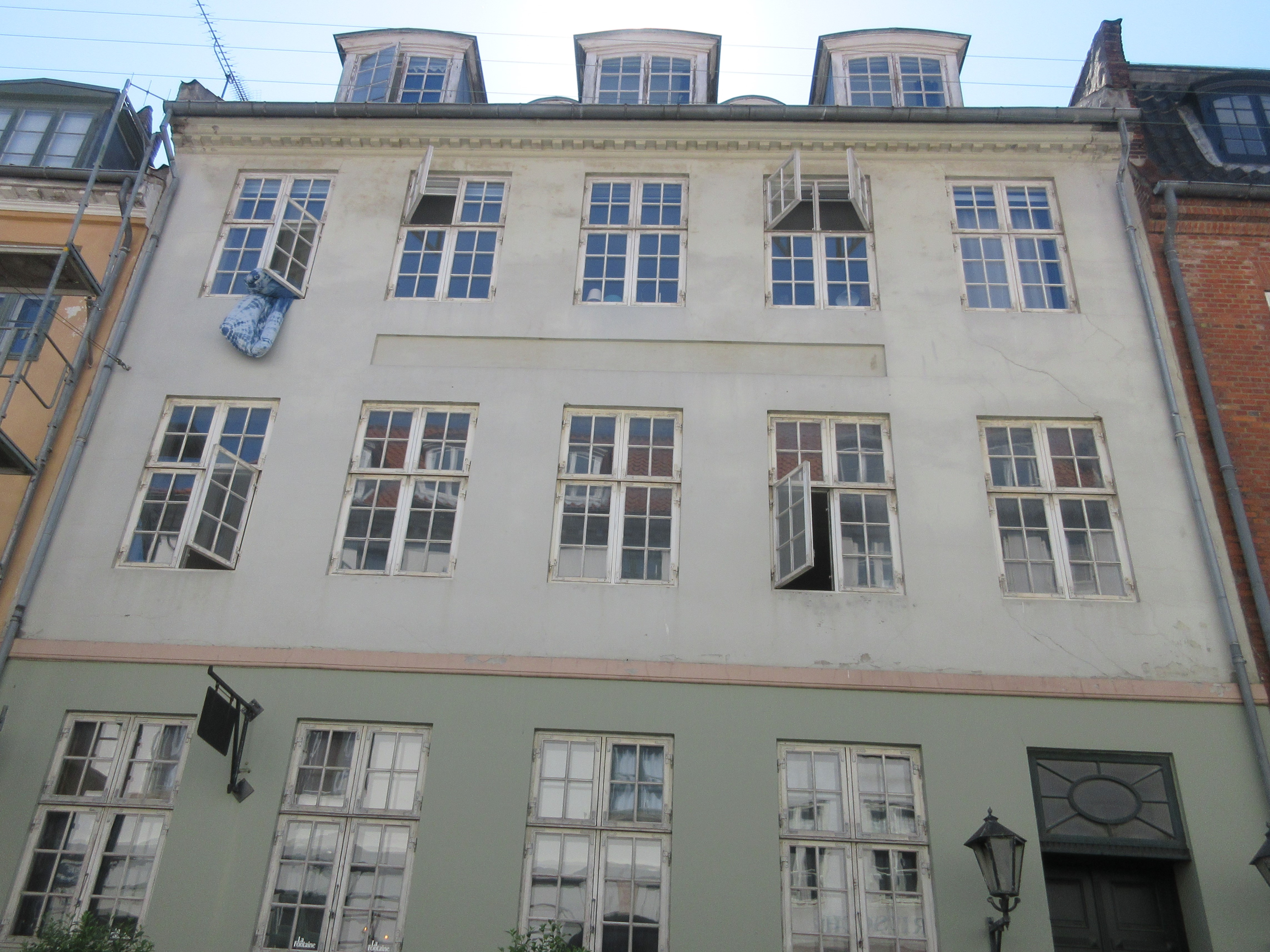
- Interactive map of the Kompagnistræde 11 area

General information
- Location: Copenhagen, Denmark
- Coordinates: 55°40′38.53″N 12°34′34.14″E
- Completed: 1797-98

Kompagnistræde 11 is a Neoclassical building situated on the shopping street Strædet in the Old Town of Copenhagen, Denmark. Like most other buildings in the street, it was built as part of the reconstruction of Copenhagen after the great fire in 1795. It was listed in the Danish registry of protected buildings and places in 1945. The jazz club La Fontaine is located in the building. Notable former residents include the sculptor Friderich Ludvig Zuschlag and the physicist and mathematician Ludvig Lorenz.

== History ==
=== Site history, 1689–1795 ===
Back in the late 17th century, Kompagnistræde 11 and Snaregade 10 were part of the same property. By deed of 28 November 1680, it was acquired by renteskriver Jacob Søfrenssen Smidt. His property was listed in Copenhagen's first cadastre from 1689 as No. 13 in Snaren's Quarter. On 16 June 1706, he sold it to Jacob Søfrensen Rachlev (Hof- og Rejsebager). After his death, by deed of 10 June 1716, it was ceded to Jens Rahr (Kommissariatsskriver). He divided it into two separate properties, a larger one towards Snaregade (No. 13A) and a smaller one on Kompagnistræde (No. 13B). By deed of 11 June 1717, No. 13B was sold to the Jewish man Bernt Jacob. No. 13B belonged to Jens Rahr until at least 1728.

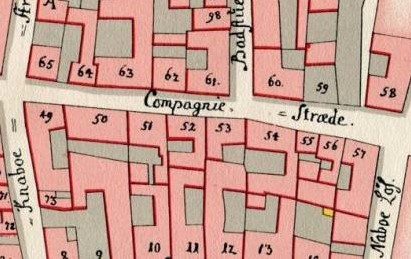
No. 52 seen in a detail from Christian Gedde's map of Snaren's Quarter, 1757

The property on Kompagnistræde was listed in the new cadastre of 1756 as No. 52 in Snaren's Quarter. It belonged to Jens Pedersen Voldbye.

The property was home to three households at the 1787 census. Jens Klidt, a distiller, resided in the building with his wife Kirstine Klidt, their 12-year-old daughter, a distillery worker and a maid. Hejman Levin, a 74-year-old Jewish man, resided in the building with his wife Sophie Depert, their daughter Brune, her two-year-old son Nathan Philip and five lodgers (four of them Jewish). Andreas Jørgensen, a stableman, resided in the building with his wife Maren Jens Datter and their one-year-old son.

=== Jens H. West and the new building ===
The building was destroyed in the Copenhagen Fire of 1795, together with most of the other buildings in the area. The present building on the site was constructed in 1797–98 for mailman Jens Hansen West (1743–1808). He was a so-called "Norwegian mailman" who operated the mail coach between Copenhagen and Kristiania. On 4 October 1773, he had married Cathrine Lindorph. She died in labour with their second child in 1886. On 10 September 1777, he married her sister Anne Elizabeth Lindorph. The building was not his first construction project. Back in 1791, he had thus constructed the building at Springgade No. 13 (now Pilestræde 55, demolished).

On 16 April 1800, West's daughter Catharina Laurentine West married Axel Kehlet. Kehlet was a theology student who had until then been lodging with a beer seller in the basement of her father's building. After the marriage, Kehlet discontinued his studies and established a candle workshop in the building.

Jens West's property was home to four households at the 1801 census. West resided in one of the apartments with his wife Elisabeth (née Lindorff), their three youngest children (aged 17 to 21) and one maid. Axel Kehlet and Catharina Kehlet (née West, 1777–) lived in another apartment with their one-year-old daughter Marie West Kehlet. Erich Bekker, an auditor, resided in a third apartment with his wife Johanna (née Dinesen), and one maid. Anders Pedersen, a beer seller (øltapper), resided in the basement with his wife Karen Andersen, their three children (aged two to six), six lodgers (four students, a widow with a pension and a man from the Poor Authority) and two maids. One of the lodgers were Axel Kehlet's brother Reimar Kejlet (1774–1856).

Reimar Kehlet was married to West's youngest daughter Johanne on 22 February 1804. The couple was later divorced. In the summer of 1885, West bought the property Lille Fiolstræde No. 196 (now Fiolstræde 16).

=== Zuschlag family ===
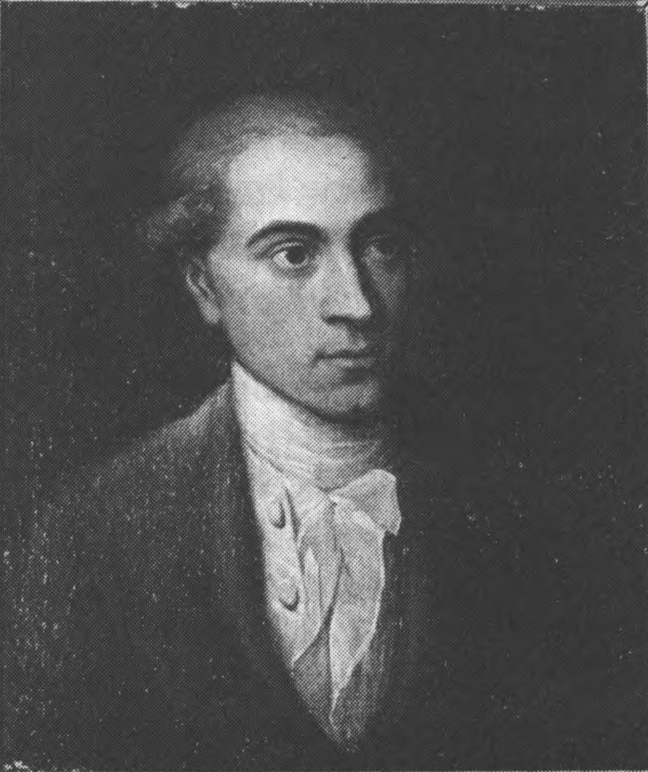
L. Zuschlag

On 24 June 1805, Friderich Ludvig Zuschlag (1759–1808) bought the property. He was married to Lovise Augusta Oppenheim (1878–1829), daughter of wholesaler Philip Oppenheim and Juliane Marie (née Quelette) Oppenheim. In the 1780s, he created a number of small portrait reliefs. In 1789, prior to his wedding, he had given up his artistic career in favour of a more stable life as a government official. In 1801, he and his family had lived in a rented apartment on Vimmelskaftet (No. 166, Snaren's Quarter).

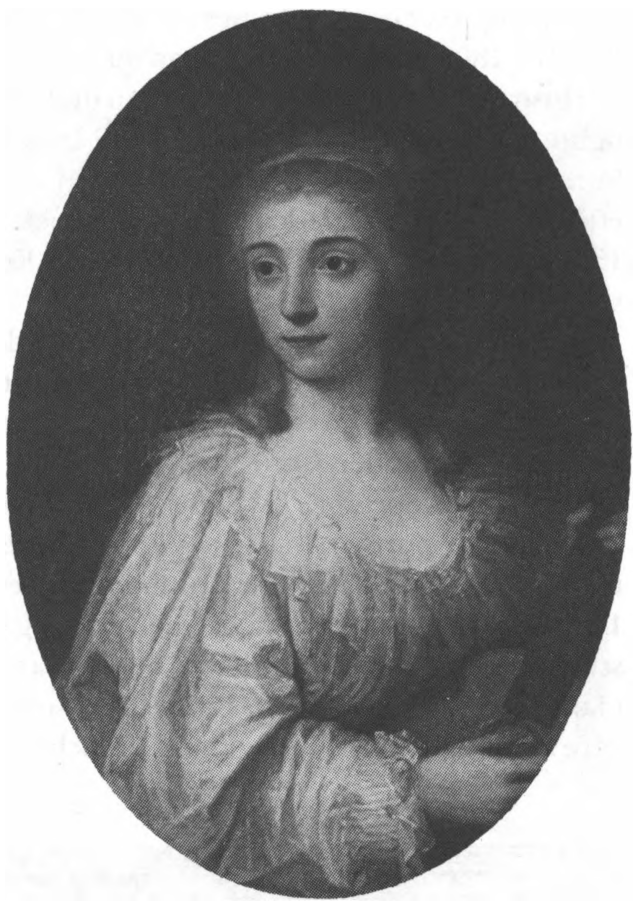
Lovise Augusta Zuschlag, née Oppenheim

In the new cadastre of 1806, Zuschlag's property was listed as No. 55 in Snaren's Quarter. Zuschlag died in 1808. His widow lived in the building until her death in 1829. Their unmarried daughter Henriette lived in the building until her death on 4 October 1842. Their other daughter Julie was married twice, first to customs officer in Næstved Gregers Fanøe and then to her cousin, Philip Julius Knudsen (1792–1850).

=== Køhlert family ===
The property was home to 18 residents in four households at the 1840 census. Henriette Zuschlag resided on the second floor with the school teacher Anna Foss, two girls (boarders/pupils, aged 13 and 16) and one maid. Niels C. Køhlert, rodemester of St. Ann's East Quarter, resided on the first floor with his wife Elisa Køhlert (née Dein), their three children (aged 11 to 19) and one maid. Dorthe Margrethe Thiesen (née Køhlert), a widow bookdealer, resided on the ground floor with one maid.Ane Catharine Møller (née Broberg), a widow tea-and-porcelain merchant, resided in the basement with her three daughters (aged 10 to 15).

The property was home to 15 residents in four households at the 1845 census. Niels and Elise Kønlert still resided on the first floor with their three children and one maid. Dorthe Margrethe Thiesen was also still based on the ground floor with one maid. Peter Christian Mønster, whose profession is listed as Bagtøjt Purser, resided on the second floor with his wife Margarethe Christine Møller, their 18-year-old daughter and one maid. Ane Cathrine Møller resided in the basement with her two daughters (aged 17 and 19).

The property was home to 28 residents in four households at the 1850 census. Niels and Elisa Köhlertstill resided on the first floor with their three children and one maid. Ane Chatrine Møller and her two daughters were also still based in the basement. They had now been joined by her 14-year-old niece Emma Rosalie Larsen. Hertz (Herman) Samiel Levin resided on the ground floor with his wife Jette Meyer Levin, their two children (aged one and two), his wife's three sisters (aged 14 to 34) and three maids (one of them also a wet nurse). Christian Ferdinand Thomsen, a senior clerk (fuldmægtig), resided on the second floor with his wife Caroline Henriette Jensen, their five children (aged two to 10) and one maid.

The property was home to 22 residents in four households at the 1860 census. Niels and Elisa Køhlert had now moved to the new third-floor apartment. They lived there with their three children and one maid. Johannes Ulrichsen, a piano maker, resided on the second floor with his wife Andera Olivia Ulrichsen (née Faith), their 16-year-old daughter and a maid. Gjerløv Christian Krog Schiøler, a theology student (1834–1913; later pastor of Gunderup Parish), resided on the first floor with the widow (of a master shoemaker Hermann Chr. Nielsen, Vingårdstræde No. 132) Lovise Amalie Uttenreitter, her daughter Caroline Emilie Uttenreitter, housekeeper-and-teacher Emilie Augusta Nelthopp and one maid. Anna Cathrine Møller was still based in the basement. They now shared it with a barkeeper, a sailor, and two maids.

The physician Ludvig von Lorentz (1829–1891) was among the residents in 1862.

=== 1880 census ===
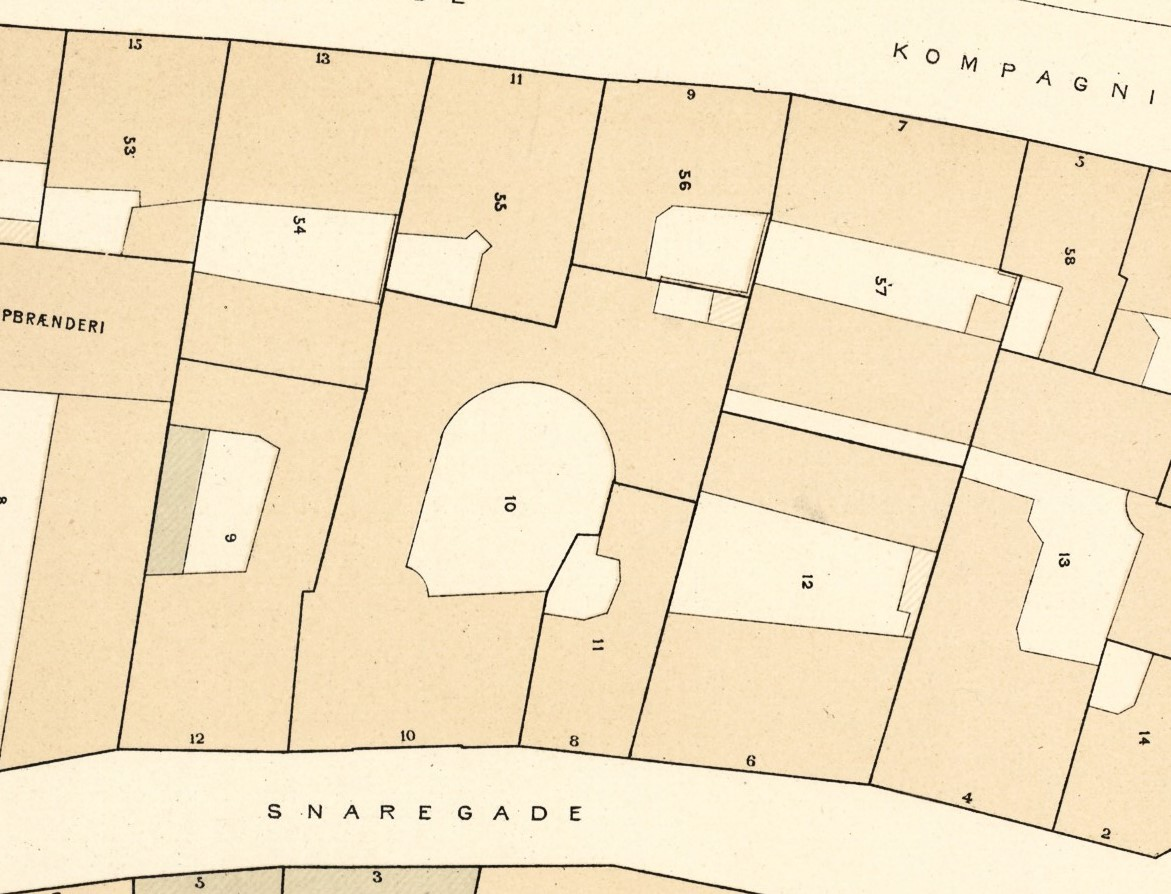
Kompagnistræde 11 seen in a detail from Berggreen's cadastral map of Snaren's Quarter, 1884

The property was home to only nine residents at the 1880 census. Ernst Durandin, a businessman (grosserer), resided on the first floor with his wife Marie Durandin (née Schraaner) and one maid. Laura Marie Stummann, a women's tailor (dameskrædder), resided on the second floor with her mother Christiane Olsen (née Westergaard) and one maid. Ernst Ludvig Christian Tiedemann, a merchant, resided alone on the ground floor. Ludvig Nielsen Skotte, another retailer, resided in the basement with his wife Ida Amalie Skotte.

== Architecture ==
Kompagnistræde 11 is constructed with three storeys over a walk-out basement. The dressed, five-bay-wide facade is finished with a projecting band above the first floor. The main entrance is located in the bay furthest to the right. It is topped by a transom window. The basement entrance is located in the bay furthest to the left. It was originally topped by a hood mould supported by corbels, a characteristic feature of Neoclassical buildings dating from the years after the Copenhagen Fire of 1795. The roof was replaced by a mansard roof in 1847. In recent years, it has been replaced by a pitched roof clad in red tile.

A three-bay-long side wing extends from the rear side of the building along the northeast side of a small courtyard. A canted corner bay improves the integration of the front wing and the side wing. The building at the far end of the courtyard is the rear side of the rear wing of Snaregade 10. The courtyard is separated from that of Kompagnistræde 13 by a wall.

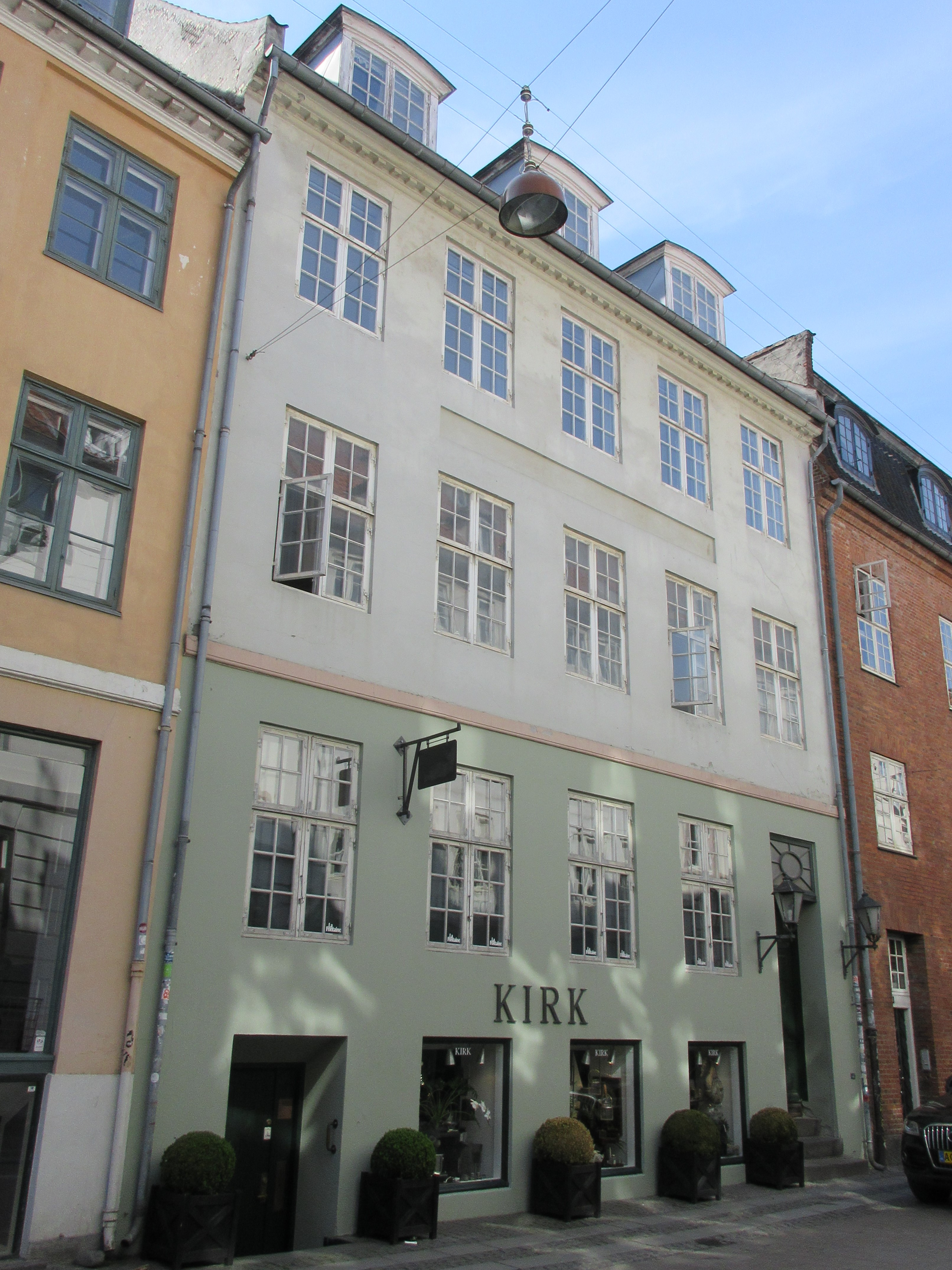
The building viewed from the street

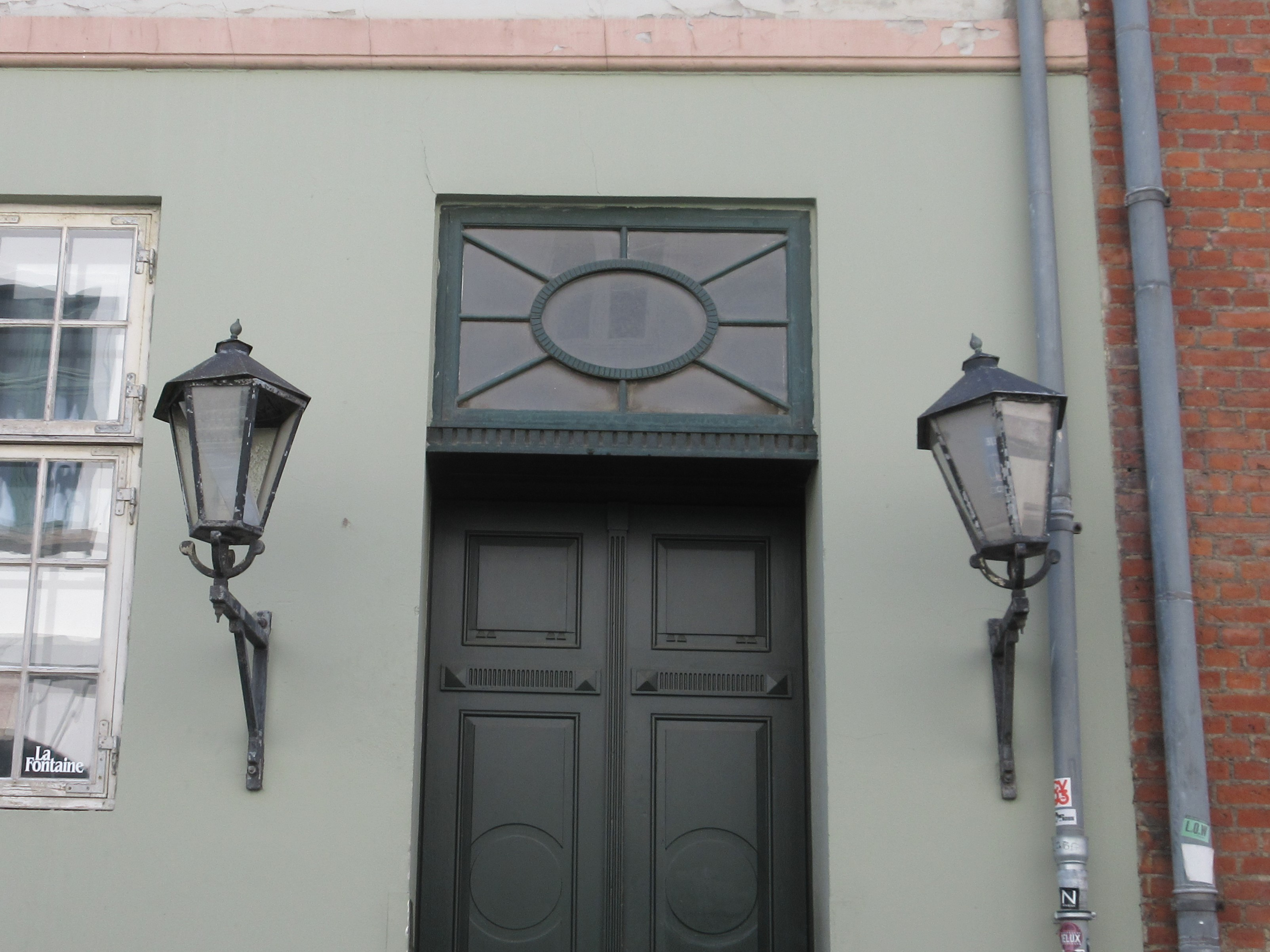
Detail of the main entrance

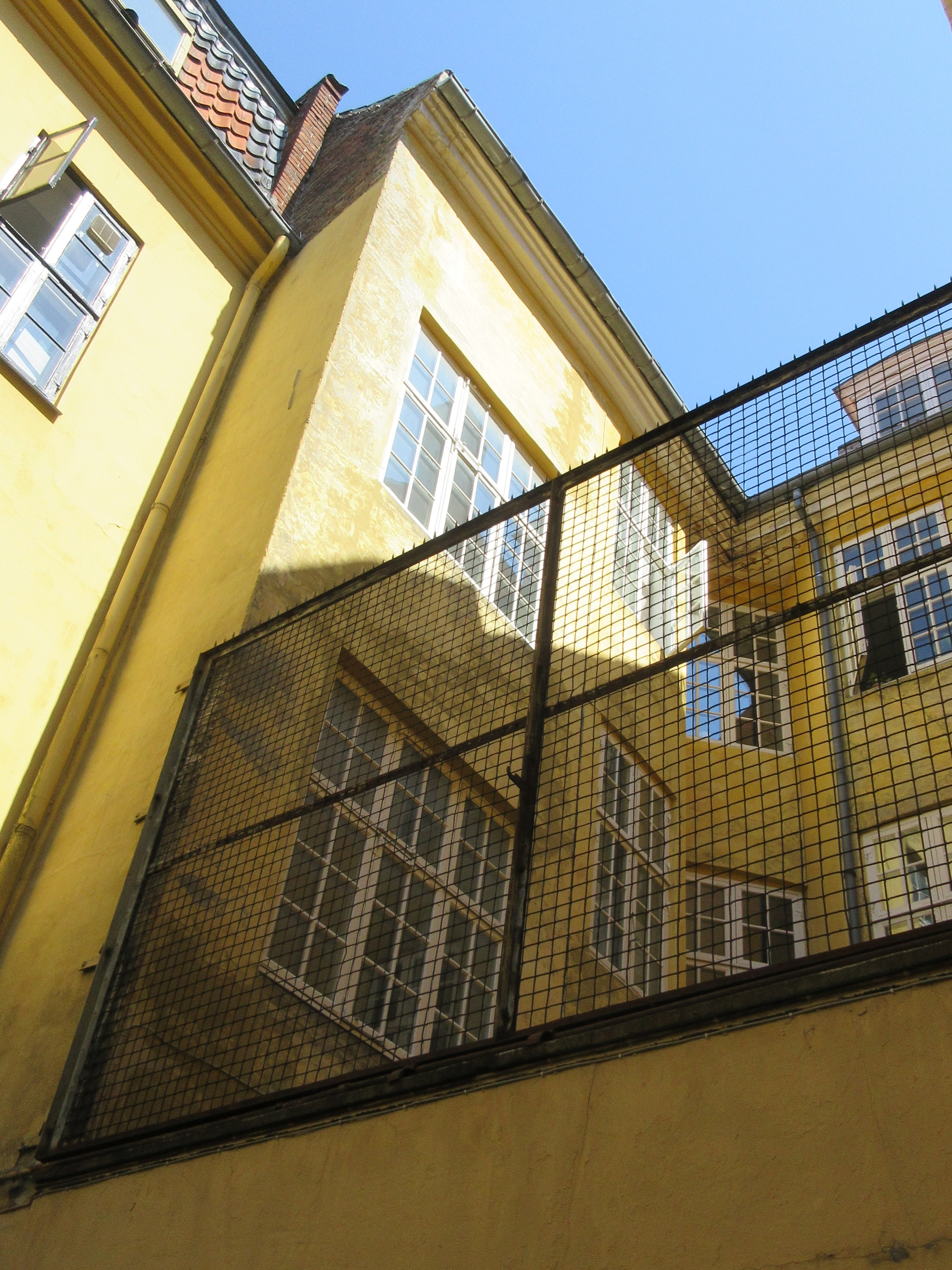
The rear side of the front wing (left) and the canted corner bay, viewed from the courtyard of Kompagnistræde 13

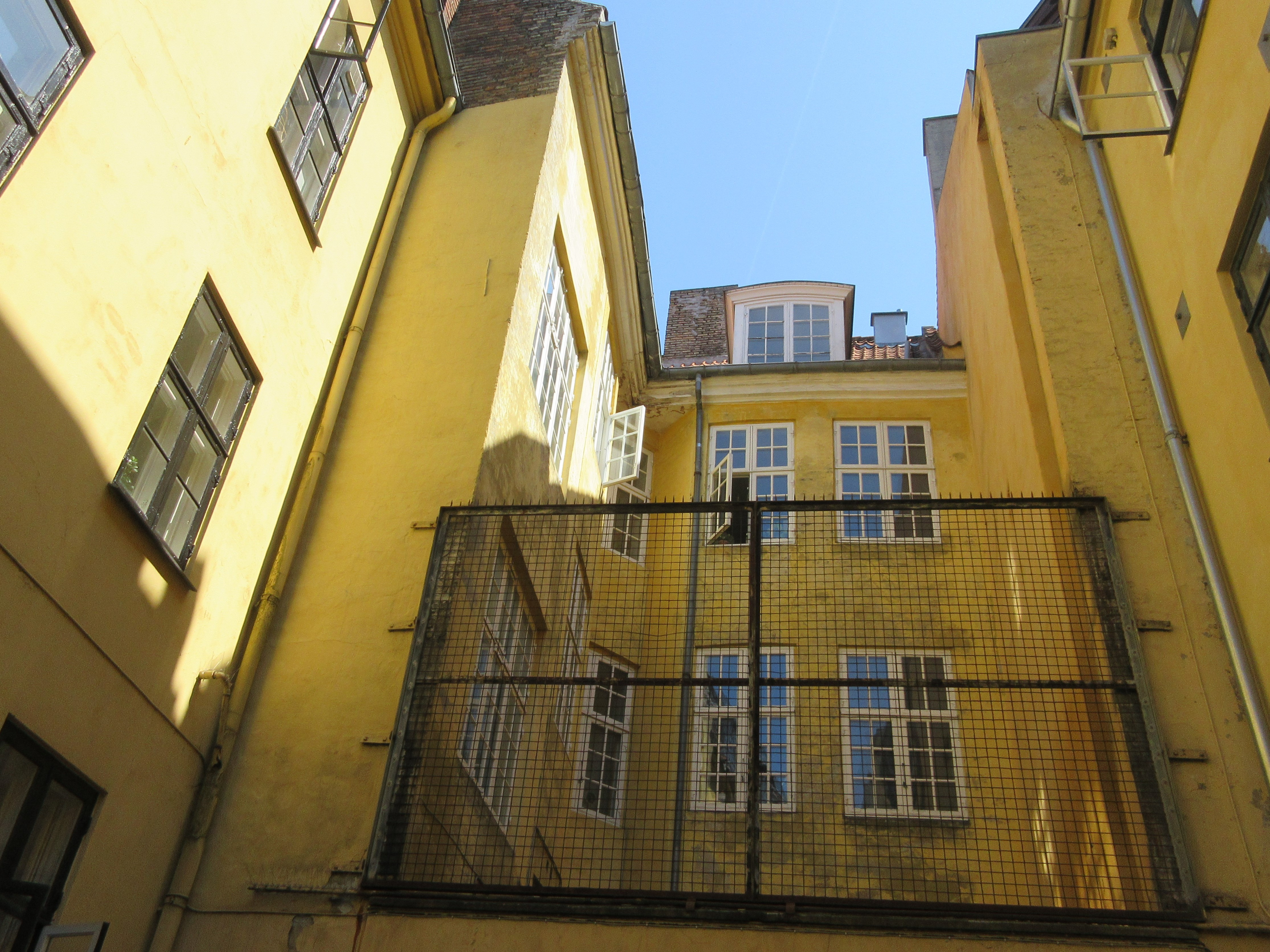
The upper part of the side wing, viewed from the courtyard of Kompagnistræde 13

== Today ==
As of 2008, Kompagnistræde 11 belonged to Peer Langhoff Mikkelsen. The jazz vlub La Fontaine is located on the ground floor of the building. It is the oldest jazz venue in Copenhagen. A shop is located in the basement. The upper floors are residential apartments.
