= Snaregade 8 =

Listed building in Copenhagen

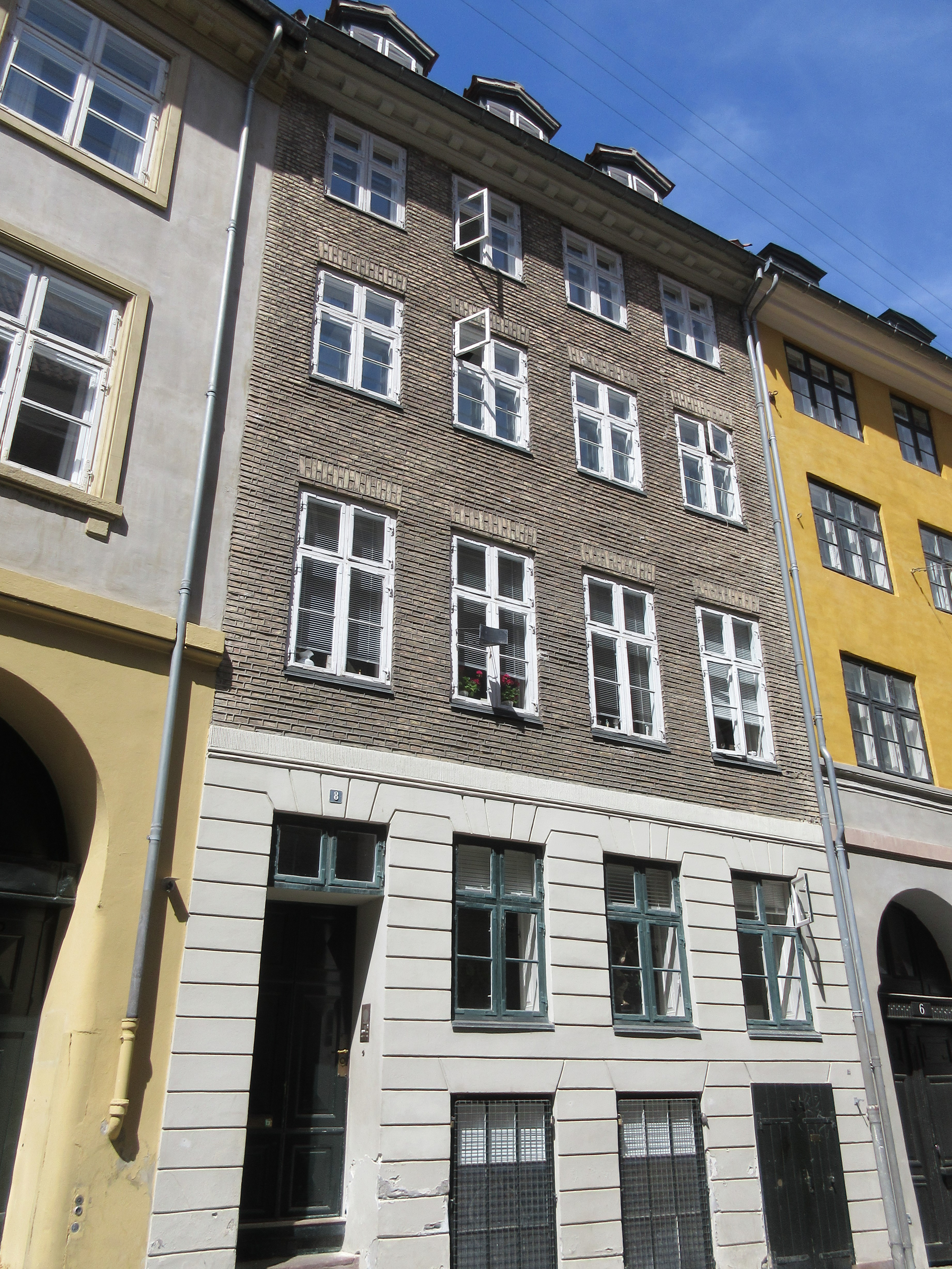
- Snaregade 8 in 2022
- Interactive map of the Snaregade 8 area

General information
- Architectural style: Neoclassical
- Location: Copenhagen, Denmark
- Coordinates: 55°40′37.78″N 12°34′35.83″E
- Completed: 1806–1807

Snaregade 8 is a Neoclassical building situated close to Gammel Strand in the Old Town of Copenhagen, Denmark. It was listed in the Danish registry of protected buildings and places in 1045. Notable former residents include the politician Frederik Frølund.

== History ==
=== 17th and 18th centuries ===
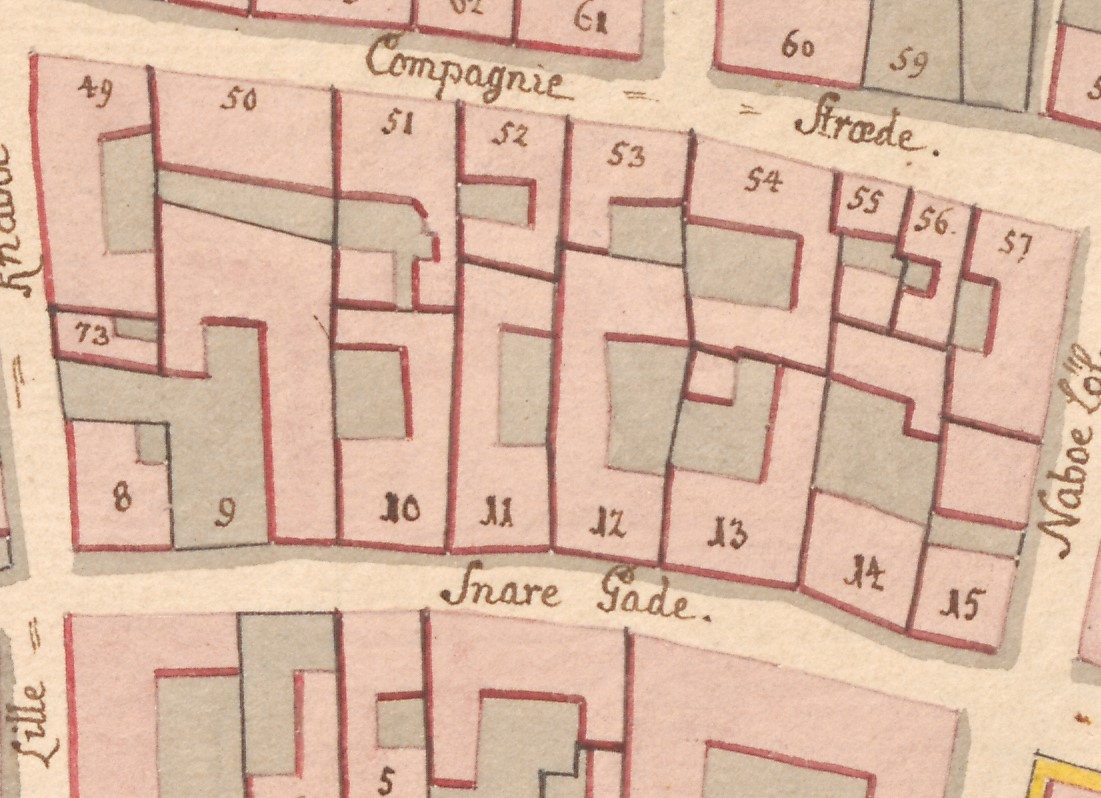
No. 12 seen in a detail from Christian Gedde's map of Snaren's Quarter, 1757

The property was listed in Copenhagen's first cadastre of 1689 as No. 14 in Snaren's Quarter, and was owned by brewer Erik Børgesen at that time. It was listed as No. 12 in the new cadastre of 1756, and was then owned by butcher Jens Stobhack.

The property was home to 43 residents in six households at the time of the 1898 census. Markus Moses Fallentin, a canvas manufacturer, resided in the building with his four children (aged 16 to 21) and two maids. Jacob Moses Magenes, another canvas manufacturer, resided in the building with his wife Bagel Fallentins Datter, their six children (aged three to 13), a 22-year-old son from his first marriage and one maid. Filiip Samuel Frenkel, a 28-year-old Jewish man (no profession mentioned), resided in the building with his wife Bilka Fallentins Datter. Christian Reiman, a master dyer, resided in the building with his third wife Friderike Kæk, their six children (aged one to 10), a 22-year-old daughter from his second marriage, 45-year-old Abigal Hartman, four dyers, two workmen and one maid. Moses Bendix Schiff, a Jewish merchant, resided in the building with his wife Bele Jacob Rafel, their two-year-old daughter and one maid. Gudman Pedersen, a 39-year-old man (no profession mentioned), resided in the building with his wife Maren Hans Datter and an 18-year-old lodger.

The property was destroyed in the Copenhagen Fire of 1795. No residents were registered on the property at the time of the 1801 census.

=== 19th century ===
The property was later acquired by brewer Isaac Bergeschow. He was also the owner of the adjacent property at No. 11 (now Snaregade 10). The old No. 12 was listed as No. 11 in the new cadastre of 1806. The present building on the site was constructed by the master builder Poul Egeroed. The adjacent building at No. 12 (now Snaregade 6) was also constructed by him.

The property was home to 15 residents at the time of the 1840 census. Ane Mandahl, widow of an undertaker, resided on the ground floor with her son Christian Adam Wilhelm Mandahl. Frederik Frølund, a theologian and later politician, resided on the first floor with his wife Anna Christine Frølund and one maid. Heinrich August Malling, a senior clerk in Rentekammeret, resided on the second floor with his Luise Birgitte Malling, his sister-in-law Elise Christiane Hagen and one maid. Christine Margrethe Borgen (née Clausen), a widow, resided on the third floor with her two sons and one maid. Karen Hansen, a widow grocer (høker), resided in the building with one maid.

The property was home to 17 residents in five households at the 1850 census. Ane Mandahl (née Schmidt) was now residing alone in the ground floor apartment. Elisabeth Regina Seifert, a widow, resided on the first floor with one maid. Moritz Albert Frederik Rauch, an army captain, resided on the second floor with his wife Mariane Emilie født Døcker, their two-year-old daughter Emilie Rauch and two maids. Wilhelm Hansen, a royal customs assistant, resided on the third floor with his wife Betzy Packness, a maid and the lodger Otto Carl Christian Schumacher (clerk in Kriminal og Politiretten). Anders Larsen, a doll-maker, resided in the basement with his wife Marie Friis, their two children (aged 12 and 13) and one maid.

The property was home to 18 residents in six households at the 1860 census. Johan Jørgen Petersen, a senior policeman, resided on the first floor with his wife Sophie Fred. Petersen, their 13-year-old son Thor Thorvald Johan Haagensen and one maid. Sara, Sophie and Hette Bendixen, three sisters employed with needlework, resided in another apartment with one lodger. Jens Christian Carl Appel, a teacher at Sankt Petri School, resided in a third apartment with his wife Thora Chatarine Sophie Appel, their infant son Carl Sophus Appel and the 22-year-old student Laurits Christian Appel. Hanne Lund (née Sørensen) resided in a fourth apartment with the 18-year-old student Theodor Adler Lund. Maria Österreich, a widow employed with needlework, resided in the garret with her daughter Fernandine Christina Janetta Österreich (also employed with needlework). Anders Olsen, a clog-maker, resided in the basement with his wife Elisabeth Christine Olsen.

=== 20th century ===
The property was home to 13 residents at the time of the 1906 census. Lauritz Larsen, who owned a fish export company, resided on the first floor with his wife Ane Larsen and his four children (aged seven to 14). Otto Emil Thagesen, a chairmaker, resided on the second floor with his wife Marie Thagesen and three lodgers. Karen Marie Sidse Kristine Andersen and Margrethe Jensen, two widows in their 70s, resided on the third floor.

The property was in the 1950s and 1960s for a while owned by Per Reumert A/S, a retailer of fabrics and sewing equipment. In 1960, H. Greiffenberg was tasked with undertaking a comprehensive refurbishment of the building for the company. In 1951, it received an award from the Copenhagen Municipality.

== Architecture ==
Snaregade 8 is a three-winged complex consisting of a four-bays-wide front wing towards the street, a two-bays-wide side wing and a rear wing. The front wing is constructed with four storeys over a walk-out basement. The dressed ground floor is finished with shadow joints. The main entrance is located in a niche in the bay farthest to the left. The basement entrance is located in the bay furthest to the right. The undressed upper part of the facade features a modillioned cornice below the roof. The roof features three dormer windows towards the street.

== Today ==
The building is owned by E/F Snaregade 8. It contains a single condominium on each floor.
