= Andreas Buntzen =

Danish businessman

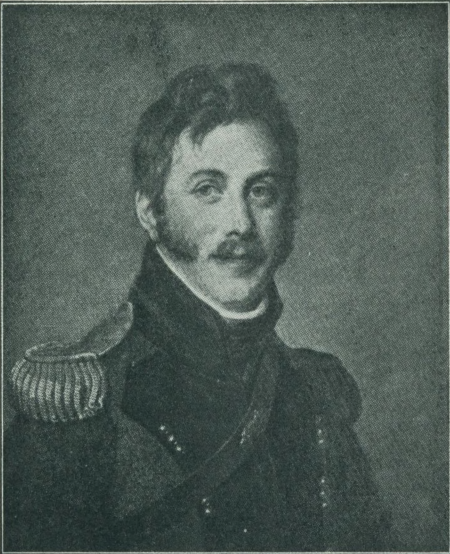
Andreas Buntzen Jr.

Andreas Buntzen (18 September 1781 - 9 June 1830) was a Danish general trader. His home at Overgaden oven Vandet 54–56 in the Christianshavn district of Copenhagen was a meetingplace for many prominent cultural figures of his time. The author Carl Bernhard has described it in Et år i København.

== Early life ==
Buntzen was born in Copenhagen, the son of Andreas Buntzen (1733-1810) and Marie Margrethe Ache. On 17 June 1772, Andreas Buntzen Sr. had acquired citizenship as a wholesale merchant in Copenhagen. He owned a large property at the corner of Overgaden Oven Vandet and Bådsmandstræde in Christianshavn. Andreas Buntzen lived in the building with his parents and sister Anne Bolette Buntzen at the time of the 1787 census. The other members of the household were the mother's mother Bolette Achem Anne Cathrine Buurmeister, an office clerk in the family's trading firm, a caretaker and two maids.

== Career ==
Buntzen received a commercial education in his father's trading firm. In 1804, he was made a partner in the firm which from then on traded as Andreas Buntzen & Søn. He continued the operations alone following the father's death in 1810. On 19 June 1812, he acquired citizenship as a wholesale merchant (grosserer) in Copenhagen. He was hit hard by the Gunboat War and his economic difficulties worsened following the state bankruptcy in 1813. In 1820, the firm went bankrupt. In 1829, he was employed as an official (kornskriver) by the Port Authority.

== Personal life ==
On 6 April 1809, Buntzen married to Camilla Cécilie Victoire Du Puy (1790-1871), daughter of the composer Edouard Du Puy (c. 1770–1822) and the actress Julie Henriette Pauline Moulineuf (a.k.a. Montroze). He was the father of journalist and editor Andreas Buntzen (1811–80).

Their home was a lively meetingplace for members of the extensive Buntzen family. It was also frequented by some of the prominent cultural figures of the time, including Jens Baggesen, Thomasine Gyllembourg (née Buntzen, his cousin) and Peter Andreas Heiberg.

Buntzen's sister was married to the military officer Frederik (Friederich) Julius Christian de Saint-Aubain. (1754–1819) and they lived in an apartment at the corner of Torvegade and Strandgade. Their son Andreas Nicolai de Saint-Aubain, who published his books under the pseudonym Carl Bernhard, has described life in the building in Et år i København ("One year in Copenhagen").
