= Caspar Henrik Wolfsen =

Danish privateer and customs inspector

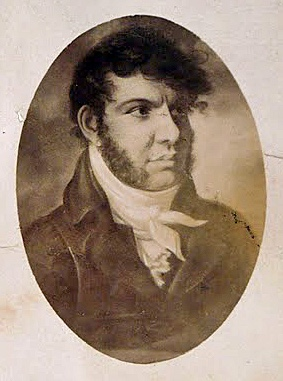
Caspar Henrik Wolfsen

Caspar Henrik Wolfsen (16 December 1781 – 29 November 1836) was a Danish privateer and customs inspector of Bornholm.

== Early life ==
Wolfsen was born in Rønne, the son of captain Christian Leegaard Wolfsen (1746–1809) and Else Catharine Boss (1750–1823). He became a sailor at an early age. He passed his skipper's exams at the age of 24 and started sailing in the Danish West Indies trade. He was also involved in smuggling.

== Privateering ==
The British attack on Copenhagen in 1807 left Denmark without a fleet. Within one week of the British forces departing with the remains of the Danish fleet, Christian VII's government in Copenhagen promulgated the Danish Privateers Regulations (1807). Denmark was at war with Britain, and a part of the fight would fall to privateers. Wolfsen was put in command of first the privateering vessel Mandal and then Danneskjold after having handed Mandal over to a brother. With these ships he captured several British prizes. By 1809, he had captured at least 22 prizes. He was the same year awarded the Order of the Dannebrog for his achievements.

After the war he settled on Bornholm. In 1821, he became a customs officer in Rønne. In 1829, he was promoted to customs inspector of the island. In this capacity, he was particularly successful in combatting smuggling.

== Personal life ==
On 21 September 1804 in Copenhagen, Wolfsen married Maria Elisabeth Undall (1786–1808), daughter of army officer Andreas Undall (1738–1795) and Charlotte Dorothea Røder (1758–1820). After her death just two years later, on 25 June 1811 in Copenhagen he married Johanne Sabine (Sebine) Behrendt (1784–1845), daughter of master klein smith Diderich Behrendt (c. 1743–1808) and Johanne Sabine Tamsen (ca. 1759–1784).

Wolfsen was a highly esteemed civil servant on Bornholm and kept a busy social life. He was colloquially known as Knight Wolfsen (Ridder Wolfsen) among the locals. In 1834, he was a driving force behind the establishment of Rønne Theatre. He was himself an actor in several of its productions.

He died on 29 November 1836 and was buried at Rønne Cemetery. His daughter Else Cathrine Marie Wolffsen (1715–1718) married Lauritz Georg William Hasselriis (1808–1889), with whom she had seven children. Their eldest son was named after his maternal grandfather. A daughter from Wolfsen's first marriage and a son from his second marriage both died in their late teens.

== See also ==
- Lars Bache
