= Susanne Lindberg =

Danish cyclist (1871–1934)

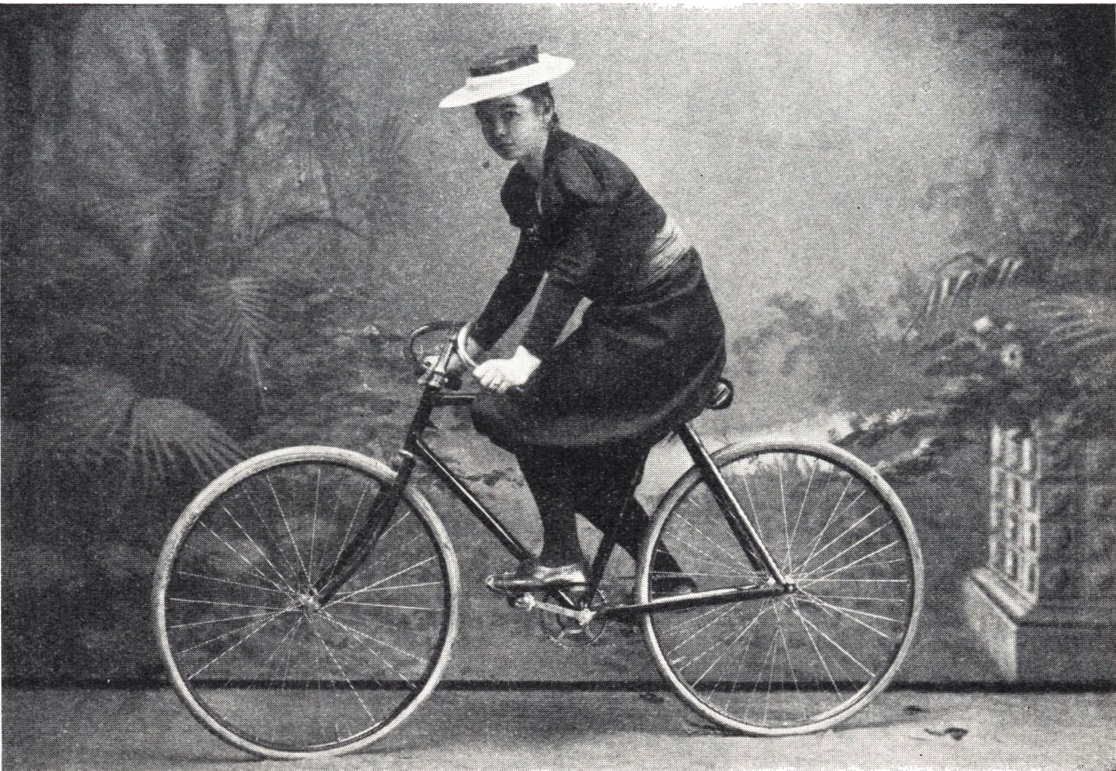
Susanne Lindberg.

Susanne Lindberg (5 November 1871 – 9 March 1934) was one of the first female Danish sports cyclists. In the 1890s, she competed alongside her male counterparts in many of the largest Danish road cycling races. In 1897, she broke the 1000 km world record with the time 54 hours and 18 minutes.

== Early life and education ==
Lindberg was born on 5 November 1871 in Copenhagen, the daughter of Lutheran minister Niels Lindberg (1829–86) and Clara Cathrine Lindberg (née Monrad, 1838–1922). She grew up in a Frundtvigian environment. Her father served as minister for a valgmenighed – a voluntary congregation in the Church of Denmark – in Jerteminde. Before that, he had served as tutor for N. F. S. Grundtvig's son F. K. Grundtvig. Her paternal Elise Lindberg established a school in Sønderjylland. Her mother moved the family to Copenhagen following the death of her husband in 1886. Susanne Lindberg enrolled at Royal Danish Academy of Fine Arts with aspirations to become a painter. He brother was economist and governor of Bank of Denmark Jakob Kristian Lindberg.

== Cycling career ==
Lindberg had her debut in a cycling race in Væddeløbsklubben's Copenhagen–Tønnede—Copenhagen. She finished as No. 5 five of the 20 participants. Later the same year, she won a silver medal in Danish Cycle Club's 18-Mile-Race (1 Danish mile = 7.5 km, making the race 135 km) with the time five hours and 47 minutes. In 1905, she finished as No. 8 of 28 participants in the inaugural Star Race. In 1905, she also participated in the inaugural Copenhagen–Esbjerg–Copenhagen Tace but dropped out on Gunen, on the way back from Rsbjerg, when it became clear that she would not be able to make to Nyborg in time for the ferry. On 1907 she finished as No. 17 in the same race.

On 12–14 September 1897, Lindberg broke the 1000 km world record with the time 54 hours and 18 minutes. This was three hours and two minutes faster than the previous record. Many of Denmark's best road cyclists, including her fiancé, Charles Hansen, acted as pacers during the event. Her achievement attracted international media attention.

== Marriage and later life ==
On 9 September 1899, Lindberg married Charles Hansen (1870–1948). The couple had seven children. They divorced in 1930. Lindberg died on 9 March 1934 in Hvidovre.
