= Snaregade 10 =

Building in Copenhagen Municipality, Denmark

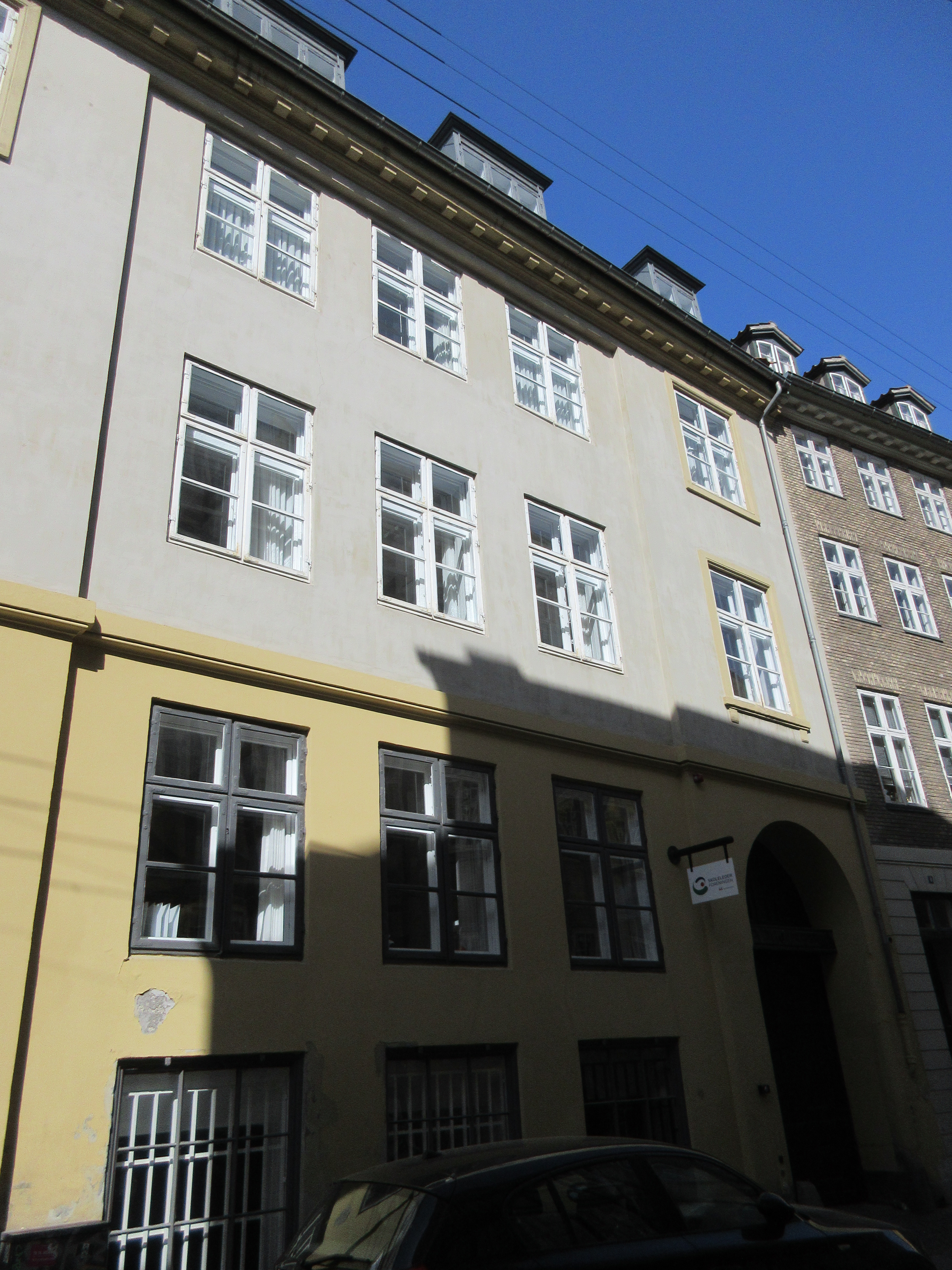

General information
- Location: Copenhagen, Denmark
- Coordinates: 55°40′37.7″N 12°34′35.33″E
- Completed: 1797; 229 years ago
- Renovated: 1971; 55 years ago

Snaregade 10 is a Neoclassical property located close to Gammel Strand in the Old Town of Copenhagen, Denmark. The book printing business J. D. Qvist & Co was from some time during the 19th century and until at least the 1950s based in the building. The football club KB was on 26 April 1876 founded in the apartment of one of the owners. The property was listed on the Danish registry of protected buildings and places in 1945. Its most characteristic feature is the inwardly curved facade of a former warehouse in the courtyard on its rear.

== History ==
=== 18th century ===
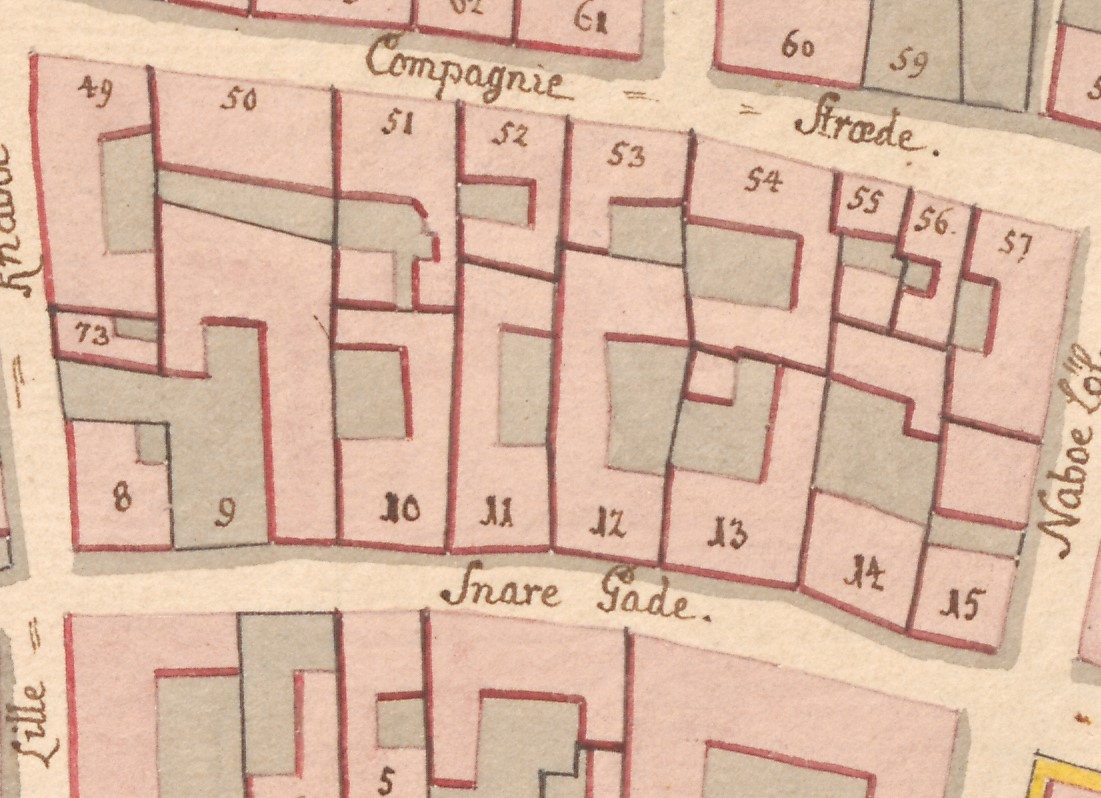
No. 11 seen on a detail from Christian Gedde's map of Snaren's Quarter, 1757

The site was formerly part of a larger property, continuing all the way to Kompagnistræde on the other side of the block. This property was listed in Copenhagen's first cadastre of 1689 as No. 13 in Snaren's Quarter and was owned by renteskriver Jacob Sørensen at that time. It was later divided into two properties, one in Snaregade and one in Kompagnistræde. The property in Snaregade was listed in the new cadastre of 1756 as No. 11, owned by kancelliråd Jens Reh's widow. The other property was listed as No. 62 and belonged to Jens Pedersen Voldbye.

The property was destroyed in the Copenhagen Fire of 1795, together with most of the other buildings in the area. The present building on the site was constructed in 1797 by master mason Johan Martin Quist. Other sources state that No. 10 was not built until 1806–08 and yet others that the building was constructed by master mason P. Eegeroed or that Qvist and Eegeroed may have built it together.

=== 19th century ===
The property was home to 35 residents in four households at the time of the 1801 census. Isack Bergeskou (1755–1812), a textile merchant (hørkræmmer) and brewer, resided in the building with his wife Anna Lund, their two daughters (aged 12 and 14), a brewer (employee), a brewer's apprentice, two grocer's apprentices (hørkræmmerknægte), a caretaker and a maid. Anders Pedersen Grested, who was the proprietor of a tavern in the basement, resided in the associated dwelling with his wife Sidse Marie Larsen and their two children (aged five and eight). Holger Christian Reiersen (1746–1811), an etatståd, resided in the building with his wife Charlotte Kirstine Studsgaard, their five children (aged one to 11), a male servant, a wet nurse and a maid. Anthon Gynther Ellbrecht, a naval captain (possibly commander of'HDNS Thetis), resided in the building with his Birgitte Marie Arnfeldt, their five children (aged ine to five), one male servants, two maids and a wet nurse.

The property was listed in the new cadastre of 1806 as No. 10. It was still owned by Isaac Bergeschow at that time. Lorentz Fjelderup Lassen (1756–1837), who had retired from the navy with rank of counter admiral in 1815, resided in the building from 1825 to 1829. His next home was at Højbro Plads 9.

The property was home to 29 residents at the time of the 1840 census. Jørgen Johannes Bech, a public official ( Justeremester), Diderikke Margrethe Bech (née Petræus(m their four children (aged four to 15), his sister-in-law Westine Petræus and one maid. Peter Margarth Ingwersen, a university student and later farmer and horse breeder, resided on the first floor with official in the Slesvig-Holsten-Lauenburgske Cancelli Heinrich Veltheim and three maids. Jacobine Friers, a 62-year-old widow, resided on the second floor with six of her children (aged 25 to 30) and one maid. Georg Flemming von Tillisch, a clerk in Danish Chancerym resided on the second floor with the sailor Christian Rise Honningdahl Warming. F. W. Saxenhansen, a clerk, I.E. Schmidtfeld and Hans Peter Sørensen—two clerks and a coachman—resided together on the first floor of the side wing. Peter Nielsen, a workman, resided in the basement with his wife Johanne Ponas and their 14-year-old daughter.

Chief librarian at the Royal Danish Library Erich Christian Werlauff was among the residents in 1851.

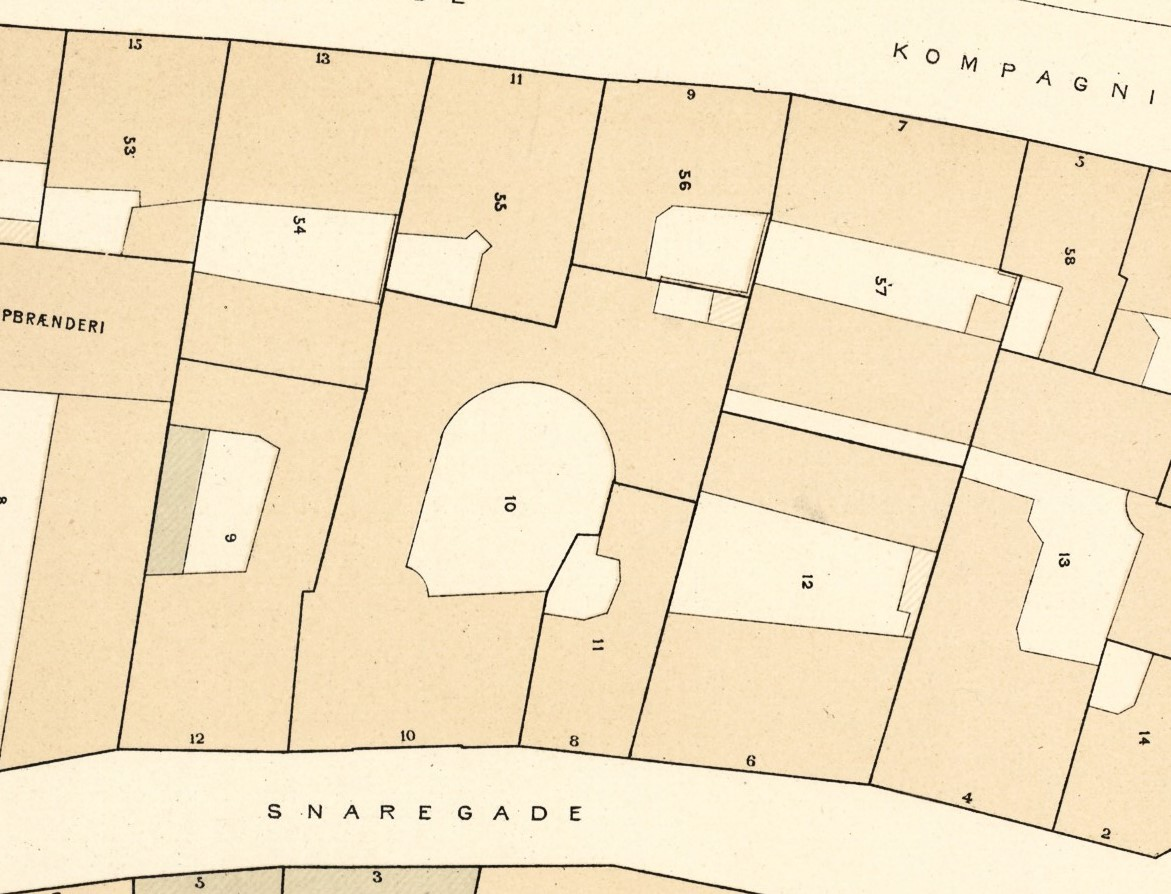
Snaregade 10 seen on a detail from Berggreen's cadastral map of Snaren's Quarter, 1884

The printing business J. D. Qvist & Co. was for many years based in the building. The firm was founded in 1792 by court bookprinter Niels Christensen and later continued by his son E. Christensen. It was later taken over by Jørgen Didrik Qvist (c. 1789 - 10 November 1866), He was a member of the Royal Danish Shooting Society. He partnered with Herman Levison (1811–1875). The printing business was after Levison's death continued by his widow Nielsine (née Nielsen) with their son Vilhelm Frederik Levison (1854–1888) as manager. Kjøbenhavns Boldklub was on 26 April 1876 founded in Vilhelm Frederik Levison's home at Snaregade 10 with himself as its first president. The three other founders present at the meeting were August Nielsen, Georg Møller and E. Semler. On 8 May 1983, Levison also founded a publishing business under the name V. F. Levison. He died on 8 May 1888. His mother owned the company until her death in 1892. It was then continued first by Vilhelm Frederik Levison's widow Hertha Vilhelmine Theodora Petrea née Christensen (1854-) and then after her second marriage on 28 June 1893 by her second husband August Gotlieb Larsen (1843–1906). Levison's son Einar Levison (born 1880) was made a partner in 1905 and became the sole owner when Larsen died the following year. The weekly magazine Danskeren until 1912 published by the firm. J. D. Qvist & Co. was in 1927 converted into a limited company (aktieselskab) with Elith Bloch as managing director. The firm was based at Snaregade until after 1950.

=== 20th century ===
The property was home to just 11 residents at the 1906 census. Anton Scholten, a professor of law, resided on the first floor with Marie Petersen. Hass Holger Georg Hass, a businessman /grosserer), resided on the second floor with his wife Christa Maria Magdalene Hass and one maid. Andreas Christian Silkeborg, a policeman, resided in the garret with his wife Frederikke Vilhelmine Silkeborg and their 23-year-old daughter Elisabeth Theodora Silkeborg (seamstress) and their son Kai Silkeborg. Carl Larsen, manager of the book printing business, resided on the second floor of the rear wing with his wife Sigrid Sophie.

The ballet dancer Ellen Price resided in the apartment on the first floor from 1909 to 1911The building was in the 1970s owned by Sparekassen for København og Omegn restaureret.

== Architecture ==
The building consists of three storeys over a raised cellar and is just five bays wide. The facade is finished by a dentillated cornice. A gateway is located in the right-hand side of the building and a cellar entrance is located furthest to the left. A perpendicular side wing extends from the rear side of the building along the west side of a small courtyard. The side wing is attached to a former warehouse with an inwardly curved facade at the bottom of the courtyard.

The entire three-winged complex was listed on the Danish registry of protected buildings and places in 1945. Hvist & Mølgaard undertook a comprehensive renovation of the complex in 1971 which received an award from the City of Copenhagen the following year.

== Today ==
The building has been converted into condominiums. The property is jointly owned by E/F Snaregade 10.
