= Ingeborg Suhr Mailand =

Danish educator (1871–1969)

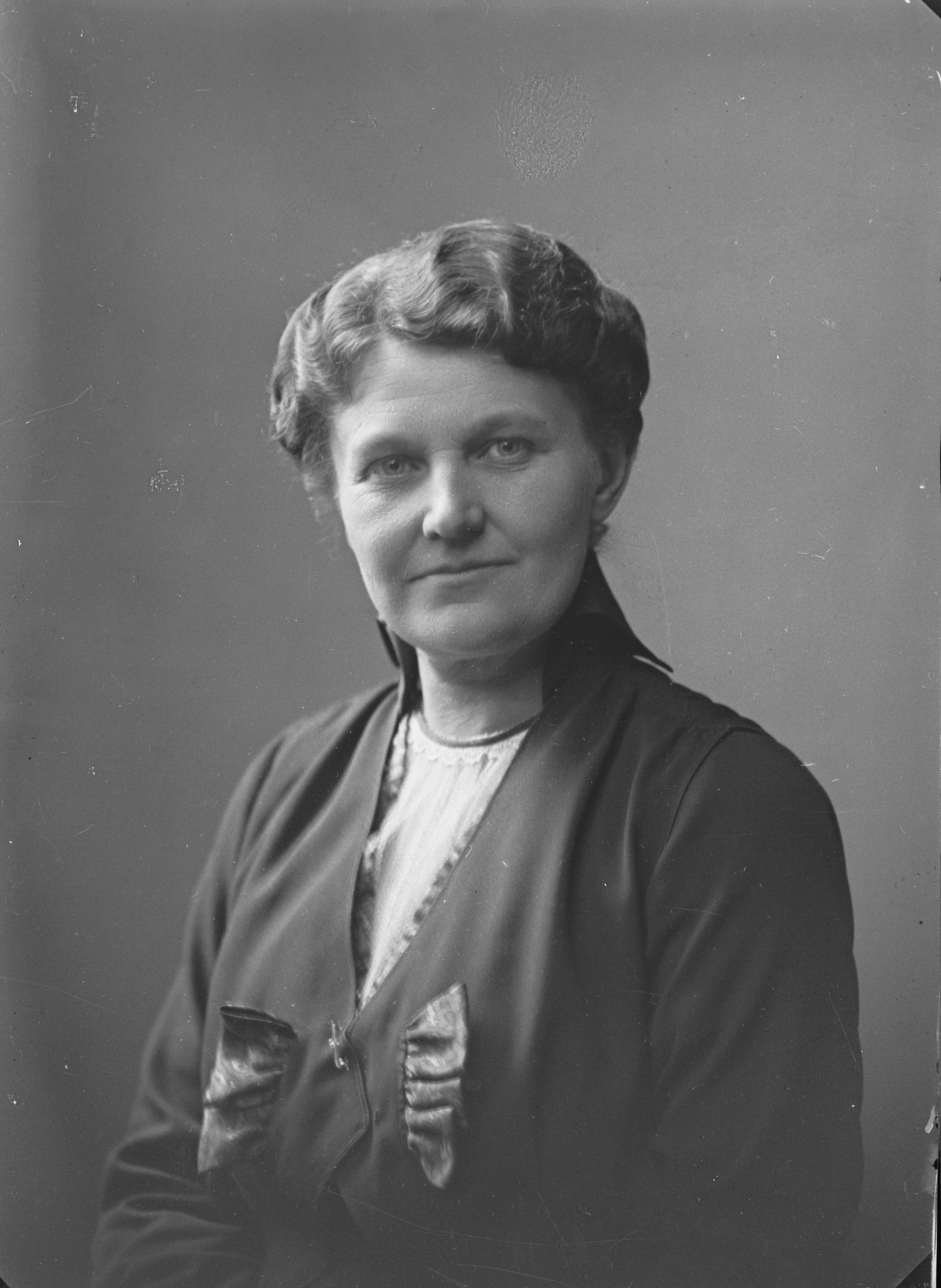
Ingeborg Suhr-Mailand by Peter Elfelt (1901–02).

Ingeborg Rasmine Dorthea Suhr Mailand (16 June 1871, Kølstrup — 27 March 1969, Bagsværd) was a Danish teacher and school principal who in 1901 opened a home economics school in Copenhagen. In 1905, she established a separate teachers' training college specializing in nutrition and housekeeping which she ran until 1951. Suhr Mailand is also remembered for her successful cookbook cum textbook Mad (Food) published in 1909 and frequently republished since.

== Early life, education and family ==
Born on 16 June 1871 in the village of Køhlstrup on the island of Funen, Ingeborg Rasmine Dorthea Suhr was the daughter of the educator and fruit-growing expert Johannes Christian Suhr (1841–1927) and his wife Ane Christine née Jensen (1846–1917). She was the eldest of the family's seven children. Initially tutored by her parents, she attended Askov Folk High School. After a period when she was employed as a hospital administrator, she continued her studies at Landbohøjskolen and followed teacher training courses at the home economics school run by Henriette Schønberg Erken in Oslo, as well as by taking courses in Berlin and Uppsala. In 1900, she followed a newly established course for cooking teachers at Danmarks Lærerhøjskole. In September 1912, she married the ear specialist Carl Adolph Henneke Mailand (1877–1967).

== Career ==
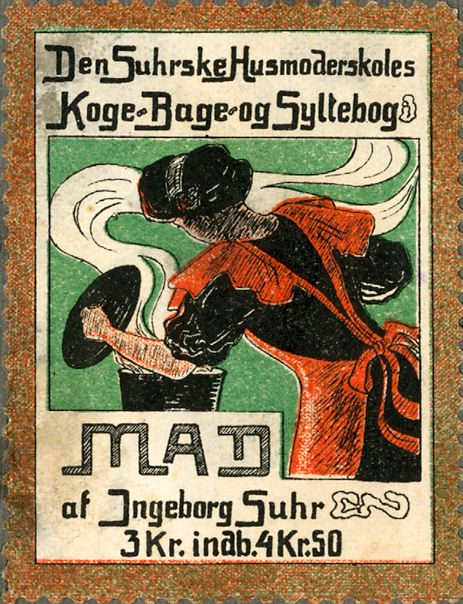
Cookbook by Suhr.

In 1901, despite lack of public support, she succeeded in establishing a home economics school in Copenhagen, initially known as Den Suhrske Husmoderskole. Receiving enthusiastic support from the press, it rapidly attracted many upper and middle-class students. After introducing teacher training courses in 1905, she opened the Suhrs Seminarium college in separate premises. Following her marriage in 1912, accommodation was provided for out-of-town students. She managed the administration of the school herself, leasing it out to Agnes Elgstrøm in 1930 and in 1946 to Ella Saaby. In 1951, she and her husband transformed the school into an independent institution.

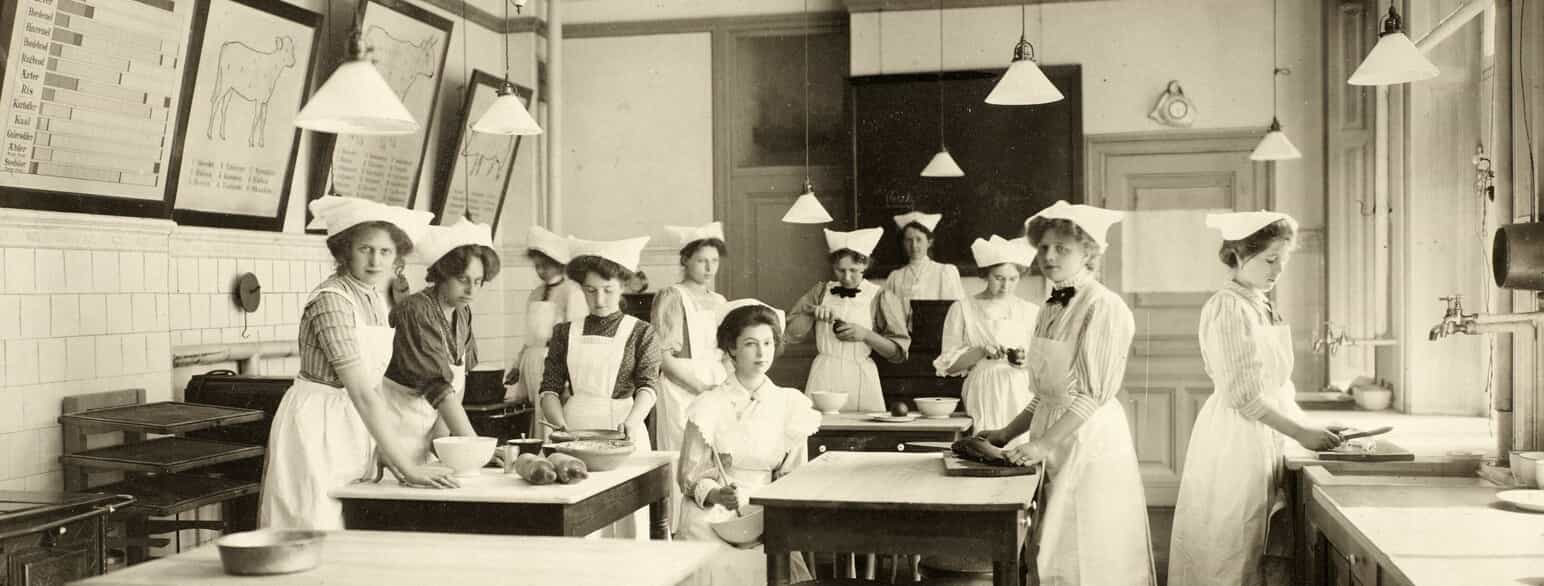
Ingeborg Suhr Mailand with her students

In 1909, Suhr published Mad (Food) which was intended both as a cookbook and a textbook. It was innovative in providing weights and measures as well as cooking and baking times. Later editions also gave nutrient and calorie values. It has been republished and updated over the years, the 17th edition appearing in 2017.

Ingeborg Suhr Mailand died on 27 March 1969 in Bagsværd, aged 97. She was buried in Mariebjerg Cemetery.
