= Erich Christian Werlauff =

Danish historian, librarian and professor

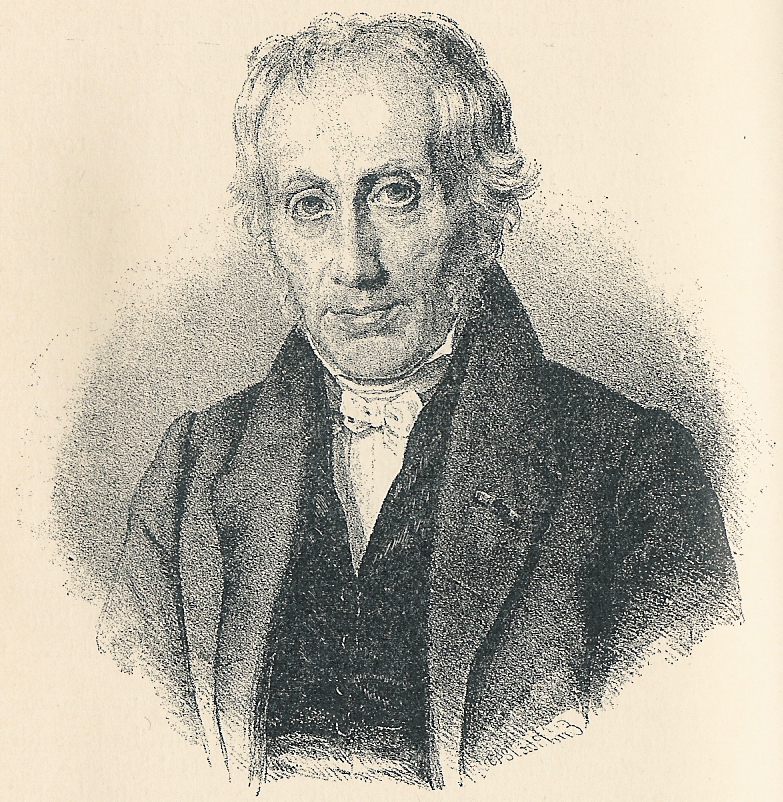
Erich Christian Werlauff

Erich Christian Werlauff (2 July 1781 - 5 June 1871) was a Danish historian, librarian and professor.

== Biography ==
Werlauff was born in Copenhagen, the son of Norwegian-born merchant ship captain (koffardikapitajn) Jens Werlauff (1746–86) and Wilhelmine Frederike Wirth (1747-1804).

In 1798 Werlauff became custodian of the Royal Library's reading room. In 1802 he graduated with honors from the University of Copenhagen. He worked until 1861 at the university library. He was second secretary in 1805, the first secretary in 1814, librarian in 1823 and head librarian in 1829. After receiving his DPhil in philosophy in 1808 on the thesis The Ario multiscio, antiquissimo Islandorum historico

Werlauff was appointed assistant professor at the university (15 August 1810). On 24 February 1812, he became professor extraordinarius and 5 December 1821 professor ordinarius. From 1836 to 1837 he was university rector. Werlauff retired from the university on 31 December 1867.

He was a member of the Royal Danish Society for History from 1806, the Royal Danish Academy of Sciences and Letters from 1820 and the Royal Swedish Academy of Letters, History and Antiquities from 1830. In 1841, he became Commander of the Order of the Dannebrog and in 1855 he received the Grand Cross. He died in Copenhagen and was buried at Assistens Cemetery.

== Selected works ==
- Historiske Efterretninger om det store kongelige Bibliothek (1825)
- Udsigt over Kjøbenhavns Universitetsbygnings Historie (1836)
- Det kongelige danske Selskab for Fædrelandets Historie og Sprog (1847)
- Kjøbenhavns Universitet fra dets Stiftelse indtil Reformationen (1850)

== Literature ==
- List of the deceased Conferentsraad Dr. phil. Erik Christian Werlauff surviving collection of books, chiefly falling to Northern history, Copenhagen 1871
- Erich Christian Werlauff: Of my youth Time: Danish, especially kjøbenhavnske, modes and moods at and after transition to the nineteenth century: EC Werlauff's surviving records. Published by Hans Degen, Hagerup: Copenhagen 1954. Originally published under the title Danish, especially kjøbenhavnske Modes and moods at and after transition to the nineteenth century: Abandoned Records in 1874 by F. Schiern.
- Erich Christian Werlauff: Memoirs of My Life. Published by Julius Clausen and P.Fr. Rist ( Memoirs and Letters, 13), Copenhagen 1910, Reprint 1968.
- Gerhard Munthe, "Library Director Werlauff and his relations with Norwegian researchers". p 5–43 in the journal 'Library History', Vol. 3, 1990.

== Note ==
This article is based partly on his biography in the first edition of the Danish Biographical Lexicon, Published by CF Bricka, Gyldendal (1887-1905).
