= 1887 in Denmark =

- Decades: 1860s; 1870s; 1880s; 1890s; 1900s
- See also: Other events of 1887; List of years in Denmark

Events from the year 1887 in Denmark.

== Incumbents ==
- Monarch – Christian IX
- Prime minister – J. B. S. Estrup

== Events ==
- 28 January – The 1887 Danish Folketing election is held.
- 17 September – The British St. Alban's Church is inaugurated in Copenhagen.

== Culture ==
=== Art ===
- The Thorvaldsen Rxhibition Medal is awarded to Otto Haslund for the painting Concerto and Hans Michael Therkildsen for Køerne vandes.

=== Music ===
- 17 September – Danish composer Carl Nielsen plays the violin at Tivoli Concert Hall in Copenhagen at the premiere of his own Andante tranquillo e Scherzo for strings.
- 29 December – The composer Frederik Rung sets up the Madrigal choir at the Cecilia Association (Caeciliaforening) of Copenhagen.
  - Danish poet Holger Drachmann meets cabaret singer Amanda Nielsen, who becomes his muse.

== Sports ==
- 23 May – Slagelse B&I is founded in Slagelse.
- 12 July – Odense Boldklub is founded.

== Births ==
=== January–March ===
- 28 January – Paul Lassenius Kramp, marine biologist (died 1975)
- 10 February – Richard Gustav Borgelin, army officer (died 1966)
- 4 March – Prince Gustav of Denmark, prince (died 1941

=== April–June ===
- 17 April – Axel Aabrink, painter (died 1065)
- 23 April – Dagmar Overbye, murderer (died 1929)
- 3 May – Ebba Thomsen, actress (died 1978)
- 22 May – A. W. Sandberg, film director and screenwriter (died 1938)
- 30 May – Emil Reesen, composer, conductor and pianist (died 1964)
- 10 June – Prince Aage, Count of Rosenborg (died 1940 in Morocco)
- 16 June – Aage Bendixen, actor (died 1973)
- 16 June – Gundorph Albertus, silversmith (died 1969)
- 18 June – Feodor Asmussen, architect (died 1961)

=== July–September ===
- 3 July – Elith Pio, actor (died 1983)
- 5 August – Thorvald Pedersen, pharmacist and company founder (died 1961)

=== October–December ===
- 5 October – Nils Middelboe, football player (died 1976)
- 13 October – Viggo Brøndal, philologist (died 1942)
- 28 October – Johannes Juul, engineer (died 1969)
- 7 November – Bertel Dahlgaard, politician (died 1972)
- 9 November – Kaj Gottlob, architect (died 1976)
- 1 December – Axel Poulsen, sculptor (died 1972)
- 12 December – Aage Fønss, opera singer (died 1976)

== Deaths ==
=== January–March ===
- 19 March – Ferdinand Didrichsen, physician and botanist (born 1814)
- 28 March – Ditlev Gothard Monrad, politician and bishop (born 1811)

=== April–June ===
- 22 April – Harald Bohr, mathematician (born 1951)
- 28 April – Wolfgang von Haffner, military officer (born 1810)
- 30 April – J.C. Jacobsen, brewer and industrialist, founder of Carlsberg (born 1811)
- 16 May – Edouard Suenson, naval officer (born 1805)
- 25 June – Josephine Schneider, educator and philanthropist (born 1820)

=== July–September ===
- 15 August – Meïr Aron Goldschmidt, journalist, publisher and novelist (born 1819)
- 25 August – Thomas Lange, novelist (born 1829)
- 16 September – Peter Andersen, budinessman (born 1814)

=== October–December ===
- 13 November – Hans Schjellerup, astronomer (born 1827)
- 27 December – Frederik Hegel, bookseller and publisher (born 1817)
