= 1888 in Denmark =

- Decades: 1860s; 1870s; 1880s; 1890s; 1900s
- See also: Other events of 1888; List of years in Denmark

Events from the year 1888 in Denmark.

== Incumbents ==
- Monarch – Christian IX
- Prime minister – J. B. S. Estrup

== Events ==
=== Undated ===
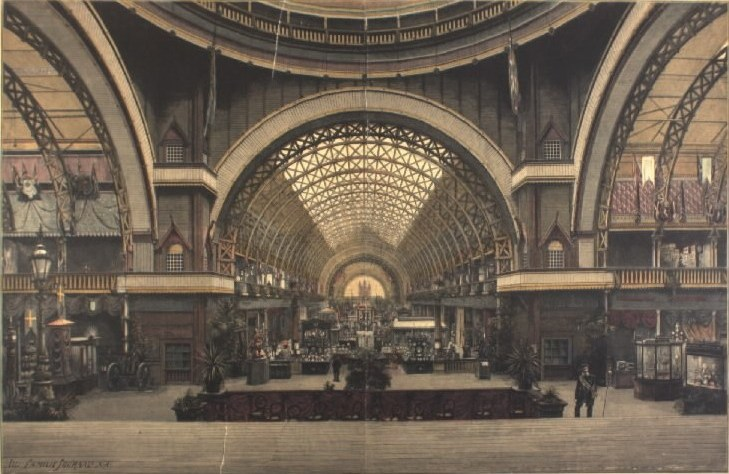
The Interior of the great exhibition hall of the Nordic Exhibition of 1888

- The Nordic Exhibition of 1888 took place in Copenhagen.

== Culture ==
=== Art ===
- The Thorvaldsen Exhibition Medal is awarded to Carl Thomsen for the painting Middag i en Præstegaard efter en Bispevisitats.

=== Music ===
- 5 February – First public performance of Carl Nielsen's String Quartet No. 1 in the smaller hall of the Odd Fellows Mansion in Copenhagen.

=== Theatre, opera and ballet ===
- 19 November – C. F. E. Horneman's opera Aladin premiers at the Royal Danish Theatre in Copenhagen.

== Births ==
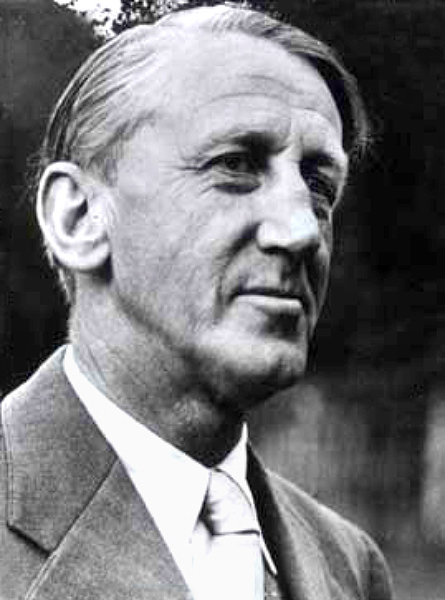
Kaare Klint.

=== January–March ===
- 6 March – Hans Christian Hagedorn, pharmachologist and Novo Nordisk co-founder (died 1971)
- 9 March – Ernestine Nyrop, textile artist (died 1975)
- 15 March – Sophus Nielsen, footballer (died 1963)
- 30 March – Einar Utzon-Frank, sculptor (died 1955)

=== April–June ===
- 26 April – Olaf Henriksen, Major League baseball player (died 1962)

=== July–September ===
- 15 July – Svend Bille, actor (died 1973)
- 28 July – Adam Fischer, sculptor (died 1968)
- 12 August
  - Prince Axel of Denmark (died 1964)
  - John Olsen, film producer (died 1959)
- 9 September – Frederik Zeuthen, economist (died 1959)

=== October–December ===
- 13 December – A. J. Iversen, cabinetmaker and furniture designer (died 1979)
- 15 December – Kaare Klint, architect (died 1954)
- 16 December – Ivan Joseph Martin Osiier, Olympic athlete (died 1965)

== Deaths ==
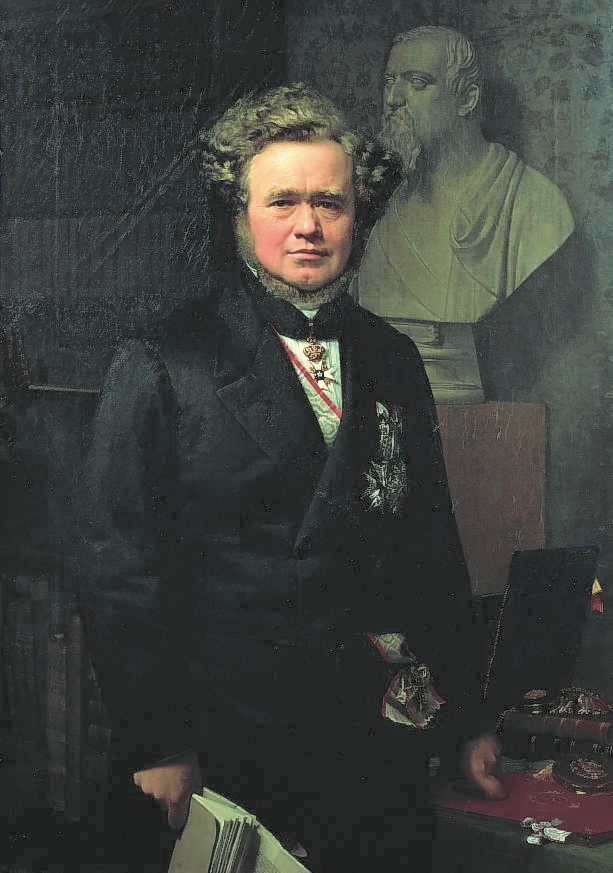
Carl Christian Hall.

- 29 February – Wilhelm Sponneck, nobleman and politician, Danish finance minister (born 1815)
- 12 March – Frederik Wilhelm Dannemand, military officer and landowner (born 1813)
- 8 August – Jørgen Roed, painter (born 1808)
- 14 August – Carl Christian Hall, politician, Danish prime minister (born 1812)
