= 1889 in Denmark =

- Decades: 1860s; 1870s; 1880s; 1890s; 1900s
- See also: Other events of 1889; List of years in Denmark

Events from the year 1889 in Denmark.

== Incumbents ==
- Monarch – Christian IX
- Prime minister – J. B. S. Estrup

== Events ==
- 6 January – the Faroese Society is formed.
- 26 February – Akademisk Boldklub is founded.
- 9 May – the Edouard Suenson Memorial is inaugurated on Store Kongensgade.
- 18 May – the Danish Football Association is established.

Undated

- Langelandsgade Kaserne is completed and opens as a military barracks.
- Kvindevalgretsforeningen is established by Line Luplau to promote women's suffrage.
- The company Dampskibsselskabet Torm is established by Ditlev Torm and Christian Schmiegelow in Copenhagen.

== Births ==
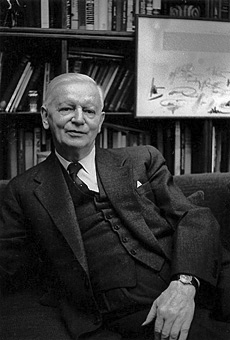
Carl Th,. Dreyer.

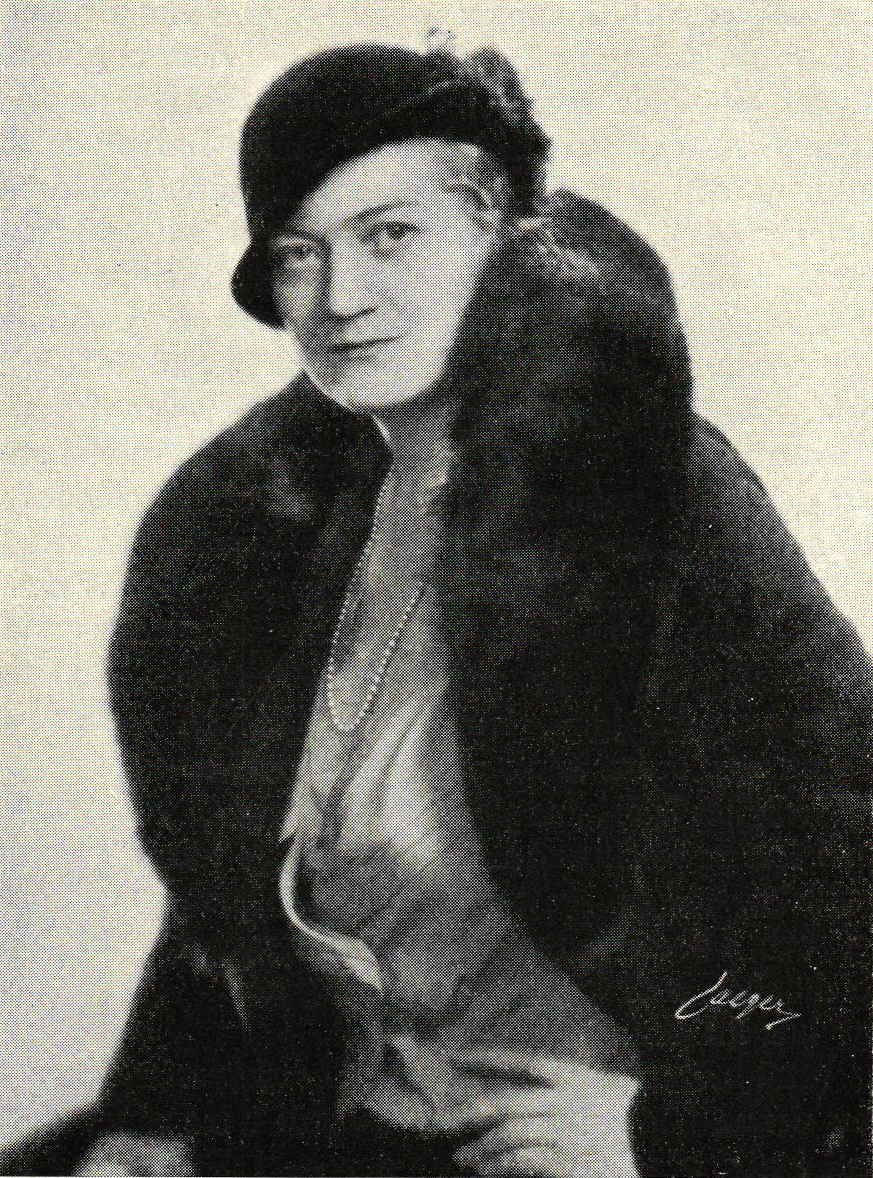
Bodil Ipsen.

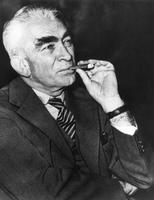
Anker Engelund.

=== January–March ===
- 6 January – Dida Dederding, doctor and academic (died 1955)
- 30 January – Astrid Noack, sculptor (died 1954)
- 3 February – Carl Theodor Dreyer, film director (died 1968)

=== April–June ===
- 16 May – Maria Garland, actor (died 1967)
- 29 May – Aksel Agerby, composer, organist, and music administrator (died 1942)
- 30 May – Anker Engelund, engineer and university professor (died 1861)

=== July–September ===
- 30 August – Bodil Ipsen, actress (died 1964)
- 4 September – Aage Rasmussen, photographer and track and field athlete (died 1983)
- 14 September – Anthon Olsen, footballer (died 1972)

=== October–December ===
- 13 October – Margrete Drejer, textile artist (died 1975)
- 17 November – Axel Saltom ceramist (died 1961)
- 21 November – Niels Larsen, sport shooter (died 1969)
- 1 December – Kirsten Gloerfelt-Tarp, economist, politician, office manager and women's rights activist (died 1977)

== Deaths ==
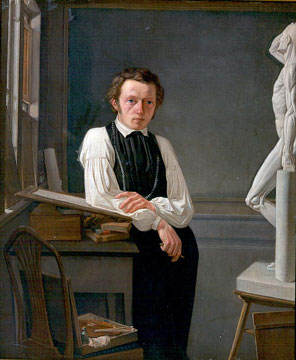
Niels Peter Holbech.

- 11 January – Niels Peter Holbech, painter (born 1804)
- 2 May – Edward Tesdorpf, landowner (born 1817)
- 9 May – William Hammer, painter (born 1821)
- 17 July – Auguste Sophie Friederike, princess of Hesse-Kassel (born 1823)
- 28 November – Erling Eckersberg, engraver (born 1808)
