= 1975 in Denmark =

- Decades: 1950s; 1960s; 1970s; 1980s; 1990s
- See also: Other events of 1975; List of years in Denmark

Events from the year 1975 in Denmark.

== Incumbents ==
- Monarch – Margrethe II
- Prime minister – Poul Hartling (until February 13), Anker Jørgensen

== Events ==
- 9 January – The 1975 Danish parliamentary election is held.

== Sports ==
- September 6 – Ole Olsen wins the 1975 Individual Speedway World Championship at Wembley Stadium in London.

== Births ==
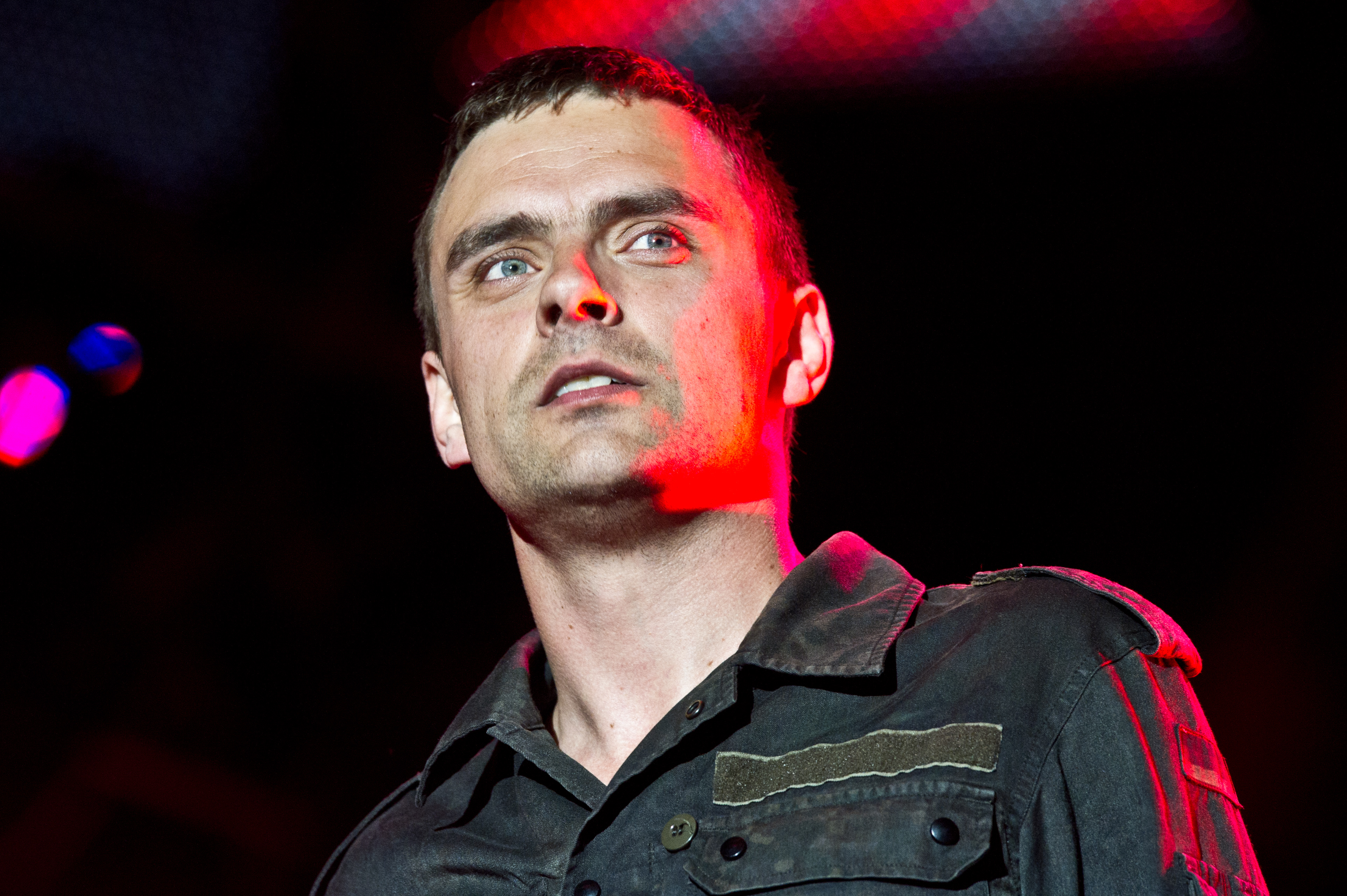
Simon Kvam.

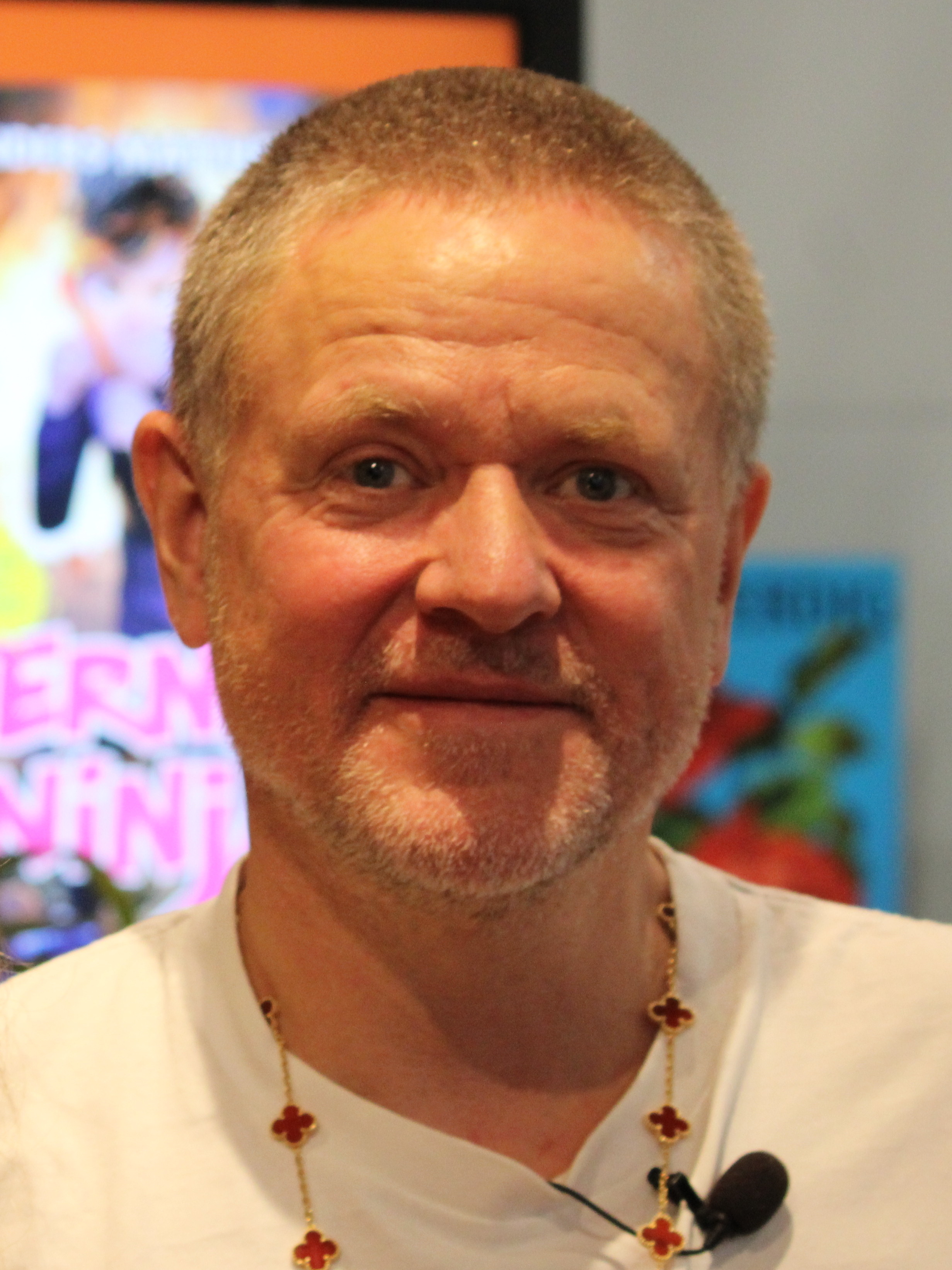
Anders Matthesen,

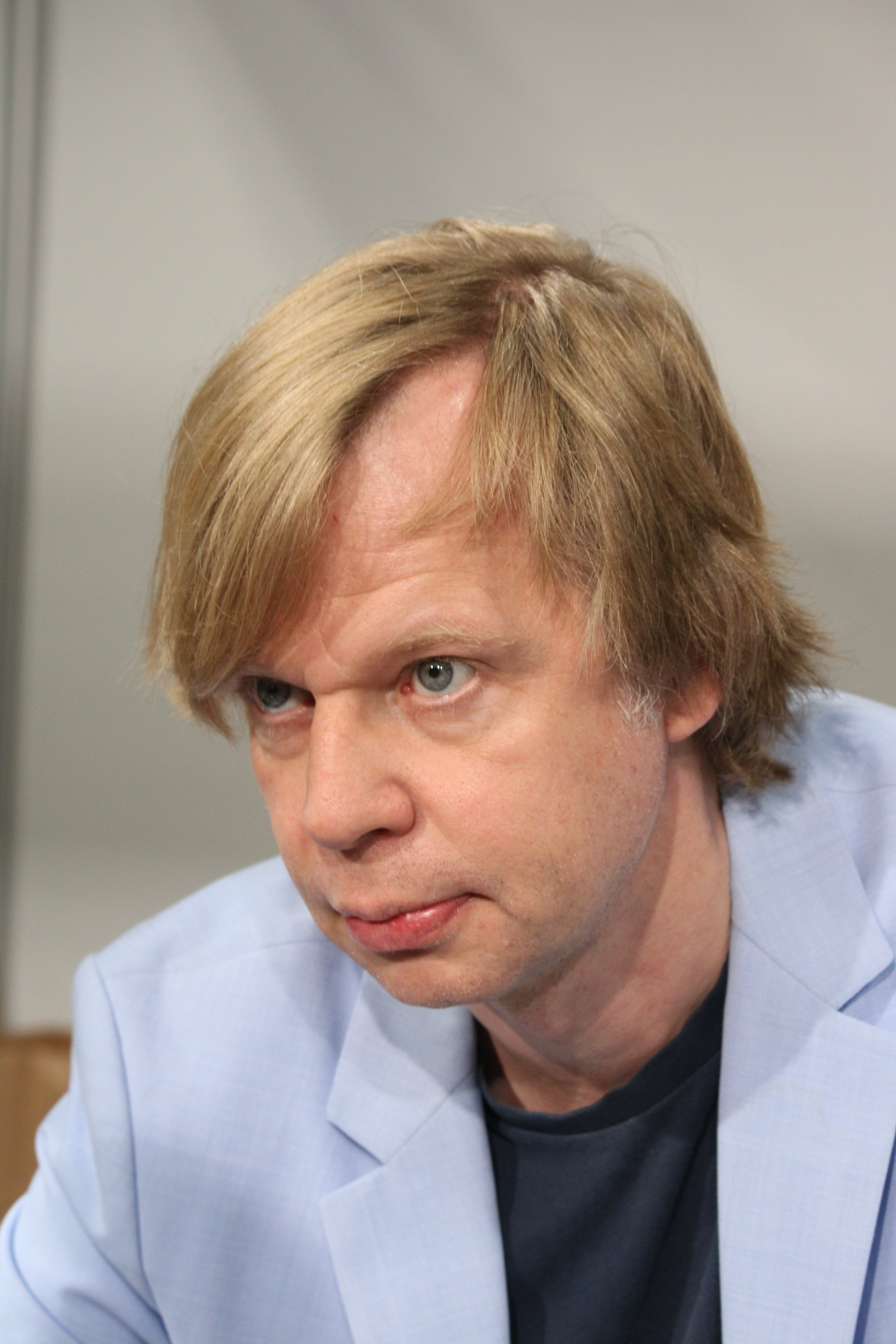
Clement Kjersgaard.

=== January–March ===
- 4 January – Charlotte Eskildsen, fashion designer
- 17 January – Nicolai Frahm, art advisor
- 28 January – Magnus Heunicke, politician
- 18 February – Simon Kvamm, actor and singer
- 12 March – Kristine Roug, sailor

=== April–June ===
- 1 April – Michael Poulsen, rock musician
- 2 May – Princess Nathalie of Sayn-Wittgenstein-Berleburg, royalty and equestrian
- 14 May – Nicki Sørensen, cyclist
- 24 May – Sofie Carsten Nielsen, politician
- 8 June – Brian Jensen, footballer
- 10 June – Henrik Pedersen, footballer

=== July–September ===
- 5 July – Nikolaj Znaider, violinist and conductor
- 6 July – Anders Matthesen, stand-up comedian, actor and rapper
- 8 July – Ole Tobiasen, footballer
- 9 September – Caroline Fleming, entrepreneur
- 20 September – Clement Kjersgaard, journalist

=== October–December ===
- 6 October – Martin Jørgensen, footballer
- 6 November – Michael Strabo, financier
- 3 December – Pernille Vermund, architect and politician

== Deaths ==
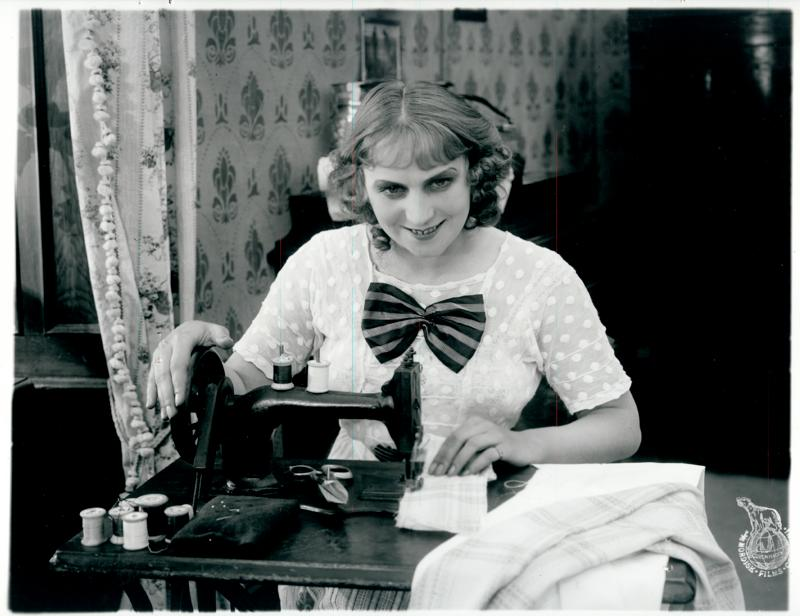
Clara Pontoppidan.

=== January–March ===
- 22 January – Clara Pontoppidan, actress (born 1883)

=== April–June ===
- 2 April – Harriet Bloch, actress (born 1881)
- 19 April – Aksel Schiøtz, singer (born 1906)
- 15 May – Margrete Drejer, textile artist (born 1889)

=== Jily–September ===
- 13 July – Paul Lassenius Kramp, marine biologist (born 1887)
- 30 July – Ernestine Nyrop, textile artist (born 1888)

=== October–December ===
- 2 October – Arne Weel, actor and film director (born 1891)
- 23 October – Kjeld Ammentorp, businessman (born 1895)

== See also ==
- 1975 in Danish television
