= 1977 in Denmark =

- Decades: 1950s; 1960s; 1970s; 1980s; 1990s
- See also: Other events of 1977; List of years in Denmark

Events from the year 1977 in Denmark.

== Incumbents ==
- Monarch – Margrethe II
- Prime minister – Anker Jørgensen

== Events ==
- 15 February – The 1977 Danish parliamentary election is held.

== Sports ==
- 14–21 Susanne Nielsen wins a silver medal in Women's 200 metre breaststroke at the 1977 European Aquatics Championships.

=== Badminton ===
- 26 March – Flemming Delfs wins gold in men's single at the 1977 All England Open Badminton Championships.
- 3—8 May – Denmark wins three gold medals, one silver medal and one bronze medal at the 1977 IBF World Championships.

=== Date unknown ===
- Ole Ritter (DEN) and Patrick Sercu (BEL) win the Six Days of Copenhagen six-day track cycling race.

== Births ==
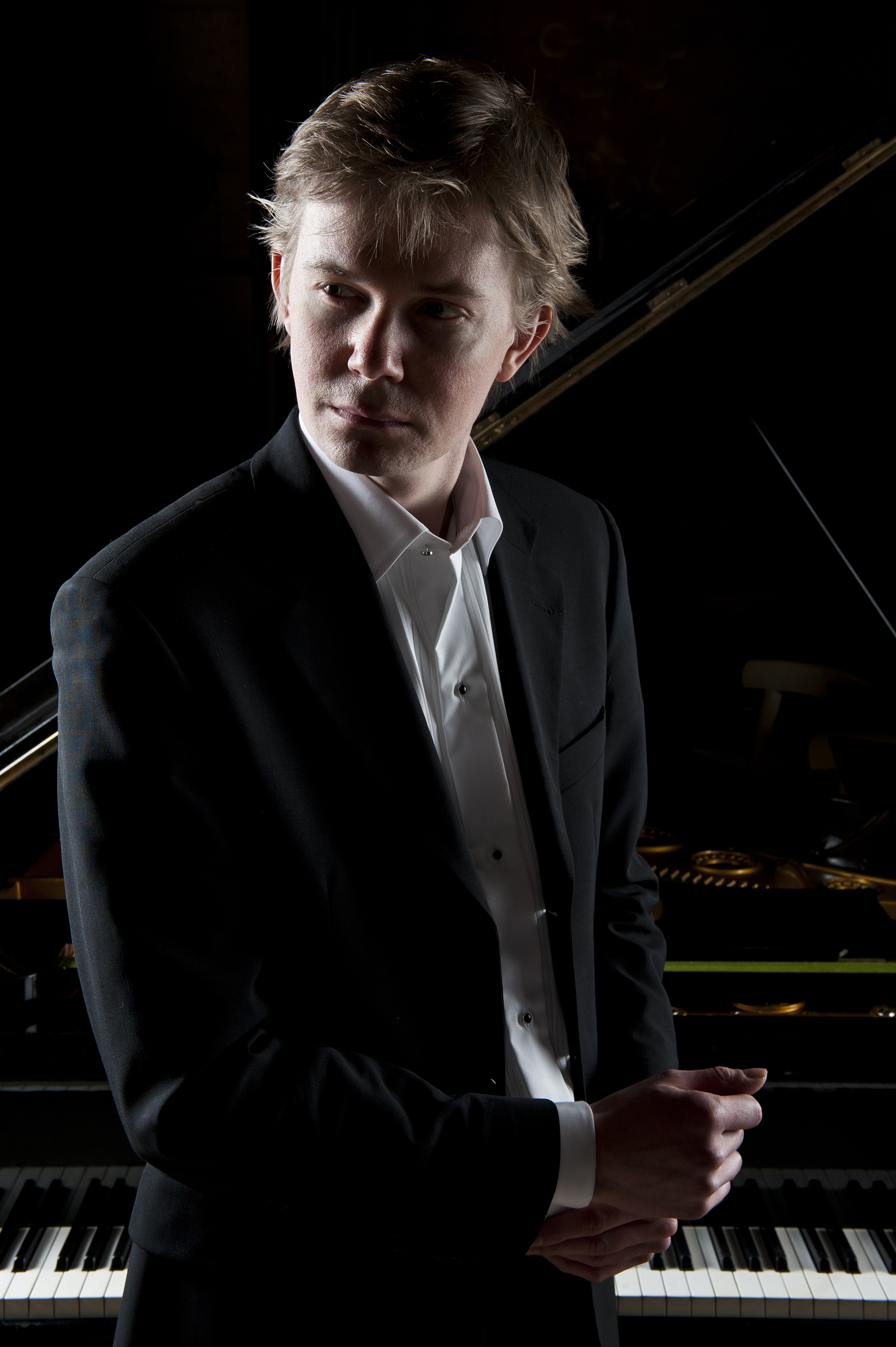
Frederik Magle

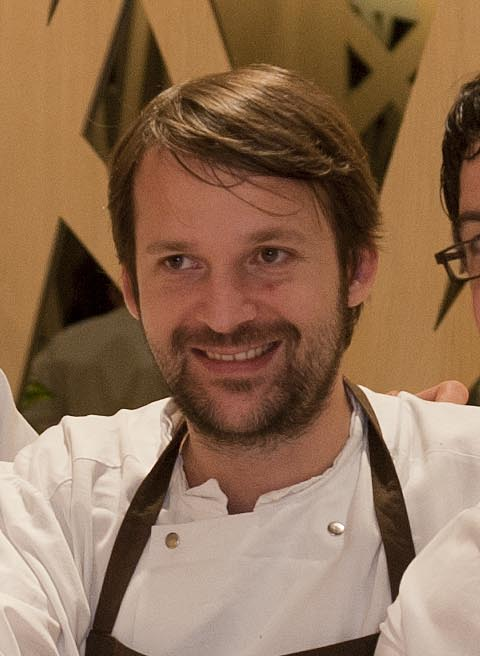
René Redzepi.

=== January–March ===
- 14 March – Ida Corr, singer

=== April–June ===
- 2 April – Nicki Pedersen, speedway rider
- 17 April – Frederik Magle, composer
- 14 May – Brian Priske, football coach and former footballer
- 31 May – Joachim Olsen, shot putter and politician
- 11 July – Casper Crump, actor
- 26 July – Martin Laursen, football player

=== July–September ===
- 6 July – Vicky Holst Rasmussen, politician
- 12 August – Jesper Grønkjær, football player

=== October–December ===
- 14 October – Tina Dico, singer-songwriter
- 16 November – Vicki Berlin, actress
- 19 November – Mette Frederiksen, politician
- 14 December – Kirsten Brosbøl, politician
- 16 December – René Redzepi, chef, co-founder of NOMA

== Deaths ==
=== January–March ===
- 4 January – Princess Margaretha of Sweden (born 1899 in Sweden)
- 16 January – Leif Panduro, author (born 1923)
- 30 March – Kirsten Gloerfelt-Tarp (born 1889)

=== April–June ===
- 1 May – Arne Sørensen, footballer (born 1917)
- 12 May – Lau Lauritzen Jr., actor (died 1910)
- 4 June – Svend Methling, actor (born 1891)

=== October–December ===
- 25 November – Jonas Bruun, lawyer (born 1911)

== See also ==
- 1977 in Danish television
