= 1979 in Denmark =

- Decades: 1950s; 1960s; 1970s; 1980s; 1990s
- See also: Other events of 1979; List of years in Denmark

Events from the year 1979 in Denmark.

== Incumbents ==
- Monarch – Margrethe II
- Prime minister – Anker Jørgensen

== Events ==
- 1 May – Greenland is granted limited autonomy from Denmark, with its own Parliament sitting in Nuuk.
- 23 October – The 1979 Danish parliamentary election is held.

== Sports ==
=== Badminton ===
- 23 March – Lene Køppen wins gold in women's singles at the 1980 All England Open Badminton Championships.
- Gentofte BK wins Europe Cup.

=== Cycling ===
- Gert Frank (DEN) and René Pijnen (NED) win the Six Days of Copenhagen six-day track cycling race

== Births ==
=== January–June ===
- 6 January – Christina Chanée, Musical artist
- 17 January – Asbjørn Sennels, footballer (died 2023)
- 2 February – Anne Sofie Madsen, fashion designer
- 17 February – Juliane Rasmussen, rower
- 1 March – Mikkel Kessler, boxer

=== July–September ===
- 21 July – Tine Baun, badminton player
- 7 June – Julie Berthelsen, singer, songwriter
- 25 June – Daniel Jensen, footballer
- 16 July – Kim Christensen, footballer
- 21 July – Tine Baun, badminton player
- 31 July – Per Krøldrup, footballer
- 4 August – Bo Svenssonm football coach and former footballer
- 17 September – Michel Nykjær, racing driver
- 18 September – Lasse Boesen, handballer
- 20 September – Lars Jacobsen, footballer
- 29 September – Nicolas Winding Refn, film director

=== October–December ===
- 1 October – Nicolai Nørregaard, chef and restaurateur
- 9 November – Casper Ankergren, footballer
- 23 November – Thomas Gaardsøe, footballer

== Deaths ==
=== January–March ===
- 28 January – Hans Scherfig, author and painter (born 1905)
- 15 January – Lis Ahlmann, textile artist (born 1894)

=== April–June ===
- 10 May – Hans Bjerrum, field hockey player (born 1989)

=== July–September ===
- 17 September –, Alf Ross, jurist and philosopher (born 1899)
- 12 September – Carl Theodor Sørensen, landscape architect (born 1893 in Germany)
- 17 December – A. J. Iversen, cabinetmaker and furniture designer (born 1888)

== See also ==
- 1979 in Danish television
