= 1976 in Denmark =

- Decades: 1950s; 1960s; 1970s; 1980s; 1990s
- See also: Other events of 1976; List of years in Denmark

Events from the year 1976 in Denmark.

== Incumbents ==
- Monarch – Margrethe II
- Prime minister – Anker Jørgensen

== Sports ==
- 6–7 April – With two gold medals and three silver medals, Denmark finishes as the second best nation at the 5th European Badminton Championships in Dublin, Ireland.

=== Date unknown ===
- Graeme Gilmore (AUS) and Dieter Kemper (FRG) win the Six Days of Copenhagen six-day track cycling race.

== Births ==
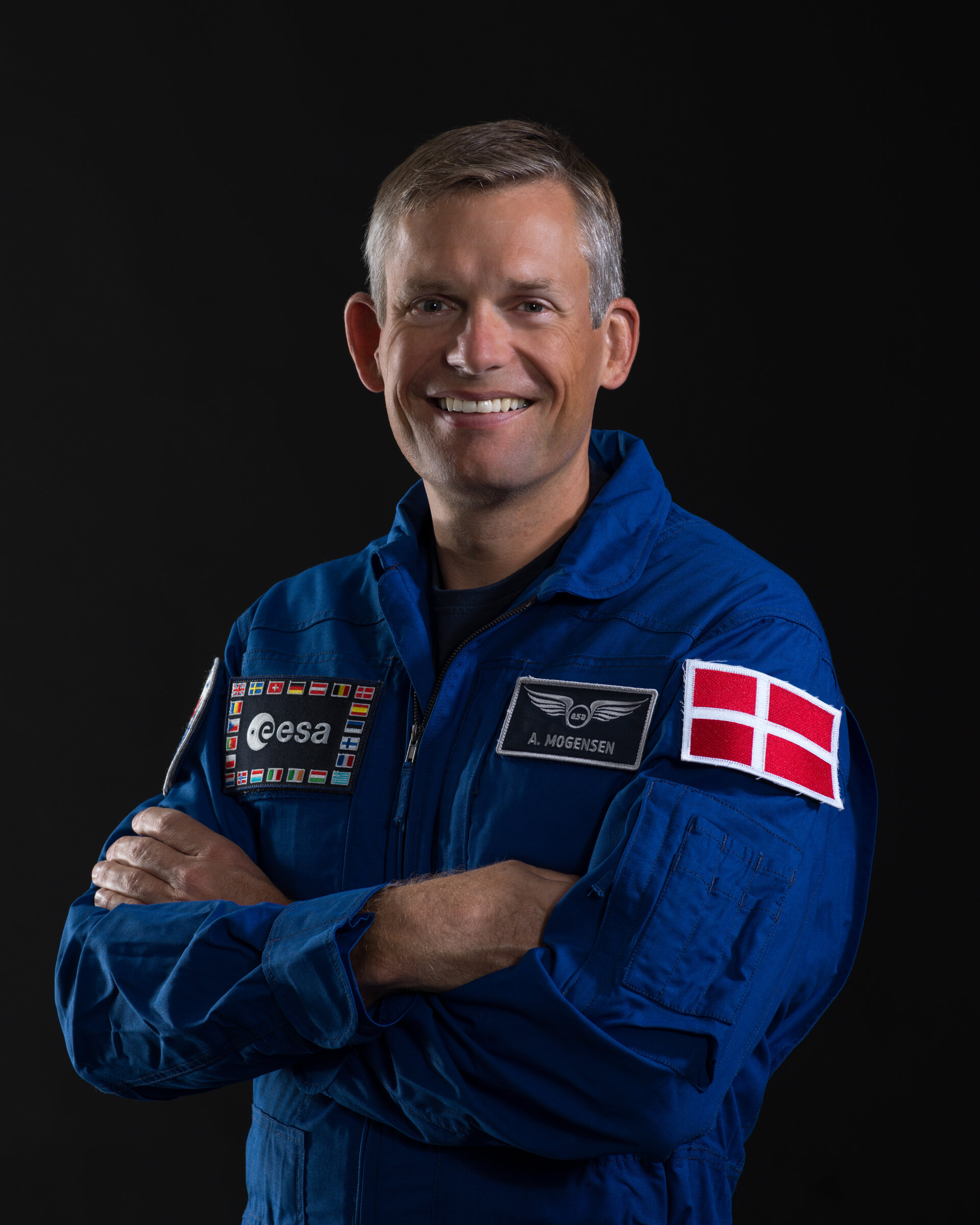
Andreas Mogensen.

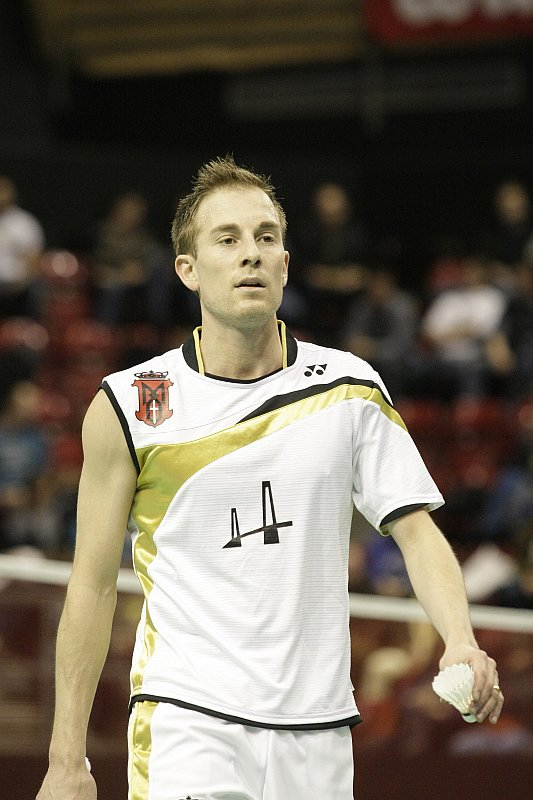
Peter Gade.

=== January–March ===
- 2 February – Gudrun Bojesen ballet dancer
- 6 February – Kasper Hvidt, handballer
- 10 March – Johan Wohlert, musician

=== April–June ===
- 25 April – Kenneth Cortsen, sport management researcher
- 26 June – Janus Friis, entrepreneur, co-founder of skype

=== July–September ===
- 28 July – Rasmus Bjerg, actor, comedian
- 1 August – Søren Galatius, mathematician
- 29 August – Jon Dahl Tomasson, footballer
- 1 September – Heidi Albertsen, model

=== October–December ===
- 13 October – Cathrine Grage, speed skater, inline skater, and cyclist
- 2 November – Andreas Mogensen, astronaut
- 14 December – Peter Gade, badminton player

== Deaths ==
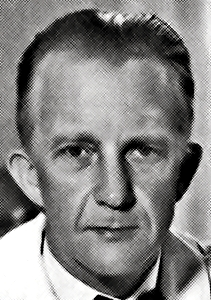
Kaj Gottlob.

=== January–march ===
- 19 February – Henrik Sørensen, writer (born 1897)
- 7 march – Tove Ditlevsen, poet and author (born 1917)

=== April–June ===
- 17 April – Henrik Dam, biochemist and physiologist (born 1895)
- 12 May – Kaj Gottlob, architect (born 1887)
- 3 June – Viggo Kampmann, politician, former prime minister (born 1910)

=== July–September ===
- 21 September – Nils Middelboe, football player (born 1887)
- 30 September – Aage Fønss, opera singer (born 1887)

=== October–December ===
- 29 December – Ingeborg Frederiksen, illustrator (born 1886)

== See also ==
- 1976 in Danish television
