= 1980 in Denmark =

- Decades: 1960s; 1970s; 1980s; 1990s; 2000s
- See also: Other events of 1980; List of years in Denmark

Events from the year 1980 in Denmark.

== Incumbents ==
- Monarch – Margrethe II
- Prime minister – Anker Jørgensen

== Sports ==
- July 19 – July 3 — Denmark at the 1980 Summer Olympics in Moscow: 2 gold medals, 1 silver medal and 2 bronze medals.

=== Badminton ===
- 23 March – Lene Køppen wins gold in women's single at the 1980 All England Open Badminton Championships.
- 27 May – 1 June – Denmark wins four bronze medals at the 1980 IBF World Championships.
- 17–20 April — With two gold medals, two silver medals and three bronze medals, Denmark finishes as the best nation at the 7th European Badminton Championships in Groningen, Netherlands.
- Hvidovre BK wins silver at Europe Cup.

=== Cycling ===
- Albert Fritz (FRG) and Patrick Sercu (BEL) win the Six Days of Copenhagen six-day track cycling race.

== Births ==
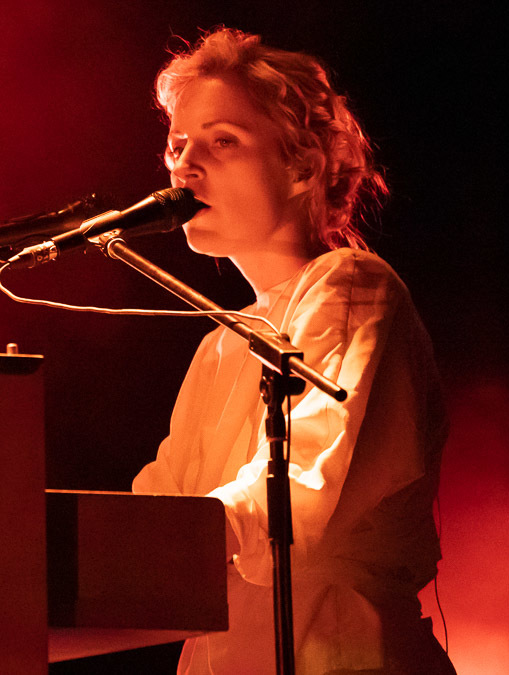
Agnes Obel.

=== January–February ===
- 1 January – Karina Jacobsgaard, tennis player
- 16 January – Lars Bak, bicycle racer
- 29 January – Peter Løvenkrands, footballer
- 1 February – Ellen Trane Nørby, politician
- 17 February – Eva Dyrberg, former tennis player
- 28 February – Christian Poulsen, football player

=== March–June ===
- 21 March – Marit Bjørgen, cross-country skier
- 28 March – Rasmus Seebach, singer
- 31 March – Martin Albrechtsen, footballer
- 5 April – Rasmus Quist Hansen, rower
- 12 April – Peter Plaugborg, actor
- 5 May – Martin Retov, football coach and former player
- 30 June – Morten Skoubo, footballer

=== July–September ===
- 11 July – Mathias Boe, badminton player
- 11 August – Jerry Lucena, Danish-Filipino footballer
- 17 August – Christian Keller, footballer
- 7 September – Rikke Skov, handball player
- 30 September – Jakob Michelsen, football manager

=== October–December ===
- 8 October – Kasper Bøgelund, footballer
- 23 October – Jesper Nøddesbo, handballer
- 25 October – Ditte Jensen, freestyle swimmer
- 28 October – Agnes Obel, musician
- 2 November – Thomas Bredahl, guitarist
- 13 November – Morten Messerschmidt, politician
- 23 December – Matilde Kimer, journalist

== Deaths ==
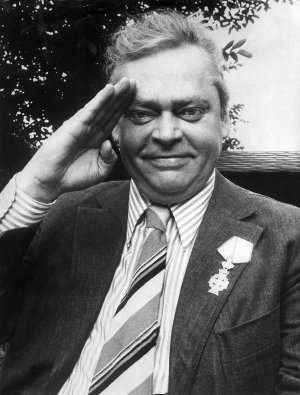
Dirch Passer.

- 19 March – Børge Minerth, Olympic gymnast (1948, 1952) (born 1920)
- 13 April – Karl Stegger, actor (born 1913)
- 18 April – Poul Kjærholm, furniture designer (born 1929)
- 3 September – Dirch Passer, actor (born 1926)
- 6 September – Gustav Weinreich, woodcarver and furniture maker (born 1886)
- 13 December – Svend Olsen, weightlifter (born 1908)

== See also ==
- 1980 in Danish television
