= 1890 in Denmark =

- Decades: 1870s; 1880s; 1890s; 1900s; 1910s
- See also: Other events of 1890; List of years in Denmark

Events from the year 1890 in Denmark.

== Incumbents ==
- Monarch – Christian IX
- Prime minister – J. B. S. Estrup

== Events ==
- 21 January – Folketing election

== Culture ==
- The Thorvaldsen Exhibition Medal is awarded to Georg Achen for the painting ]Johanne Achen. The Artist's Mother.

== Sports ==
- Roskilde Roklub is founded.

== Births ==
=== January–March ===
- 17 February – Harald Hansen, painter (died 1967)
- 20 March – Lauritz Melchior, singer (died 1973)

=== April–June ===
- 7 April – Paul Berth, footballer (died 1969)
- 21 April – Aage Rafn, architect (died 1953)
- 12 June – Karl Jørgensen, actor (died 1956)
- 21 June – Andreas Friis, painter (died 1983)

=== July–September ===
- 20 July – Julie Vinter Hansen, astronomer (died 1960)
- 13 August – Ellen Osiier, fencer (died 1962)
- 22 August – Herman Ipsen Lund, boat builder and designer (died 1981)

=== October–December ===
- 1 November – Henry Nielsen, actor (died 1967)
- 8 November – Prince Erik, Count of Rosenborg (died 1950)

== Deaths ==
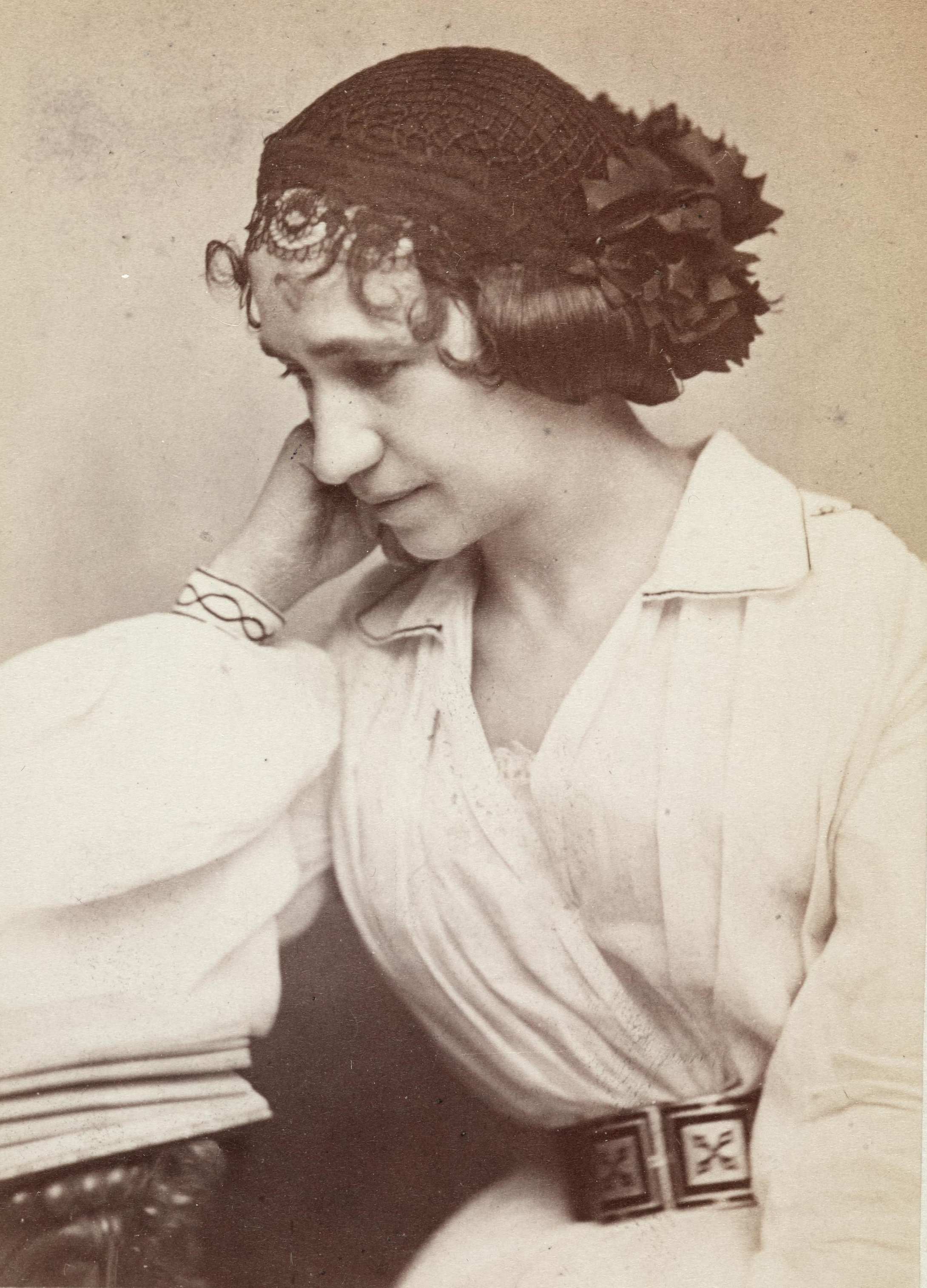
Johanne Luise Heiberg.

=== January–March ===
- 2 January – Henrik Olrik, painter (born 1830)
- 22 February – Carl Bloch, painter (born 1834)
- 2 March – Jørgen Balthasar Dalhoff, goldsmith and industrialist (born 1800)

=== July–September ===
- 24 July – Johannes Peter Langgaard, businessman and brickyard owner (born 1811)
- 10 July – Heinrich Hansen, painter (born 1821)
- 24 September – Rasmus Malling-Hansen, inventor, Lutheran minister and educator (born 1835)

=== October–December ===
- 16 November – Georg Grüner, landowner, politician and co-founder of Landmandsbanken (born 1817)
- 22 November – Johanne Luise Heiberg, actress (born 1812)
- 21 December – Niels Gade, composer (born 1817)
