= 1886 in Denmark =

- Decades: 1860s; 1870s; 1880s; 1890s; 1900s
- See also: Other events of 1886; List of years in Denmark

Events from the year 1886 in Denmark.

== Incumbents ==
- Monarch – Christian IX
- Prime minister – J. B. S. Estrup

== Events ==
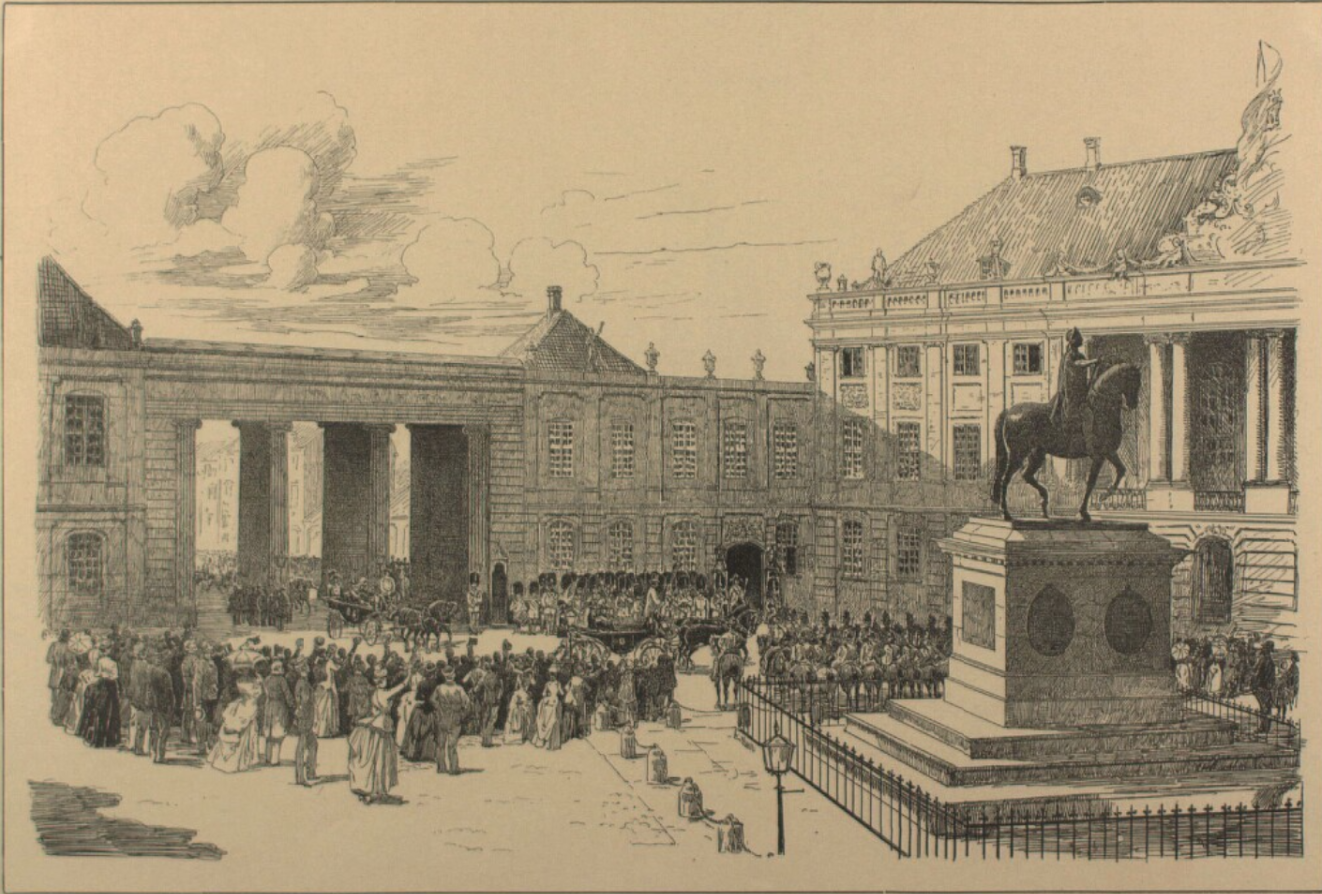
17 August: King Luís I of Portugal arriving at Amalienborg Palace

- 14 April
  - HDMS Iver Hvitfeldt is launched at Nyholm in Copenhagen.
  - Ringkøbing Landbobank is founded.
- 20 April FDB is founded.
- 17 August – King Luís I of Portugal is received at Amalienborg Palace during his visit to Denmark.

=== Undated ===
- The Circus Building in Copenhagen is completed.

== Culture ==
- The Thorvaldsen Exhibition Medal is awarded to Viggo Johansen for the painting Evening talk.

== Sports ==
- 17 July – Boldklubben Frem is founded.

== Births ==
=== January–March ===
- 17 January – Johan Ankerstjerne, cinematographer (died 1959)
- 26 January
  - Johannes Bjerg, sculptor (died 1955)
  - Kræsten Iversen, artist (died 1955)
- 17 February – Ole Falkentorp, architect (died 1948)
- 20 February – Peter Freuchen, arctic explorer and writer (died 1957)

=== April–June ===
- 26 April – Olaf Rude, painter (died 1957)
- 1 May – Ville Jais Nielsen, painter and sculptor (died 1949)
- 12 May – Kay Nielsen, illustrator (died 1957 in the United States)
  - 16 May – Peter L. Jensen, engineer and inventor (died 1961 in the United States)
- 17 May – Oscar Gundlach-Pedersen, architect (died 1960)
- 19 May
  - Sigurd Kielland Brandt, painter (died 1964)
  - Øjvind Winge, biologist (died 1954)
- 30 June – Launy Grøndahl, composer and conductor (died 1960)

=== July–September ===
- 12 July – Jean Hersholt, actor (died 1956 in the United States)
- 15 August – Kay Bojesen, designer (died 1958)
- 13 September – Ellen Dahl, writer (died 1959)
- 29 September – Emilie Sannom, silent film actress and aerial acrobat (died 1931)

=== October–December ===
- 12 October – Gustav Weinreich, woodcarver and furniture maker (died 1980)
- 30 October – William Scharff, painter (died 1959)
- 16 December – Ingeborg Pehrson, asctress (died 1950)

== Deaths ==
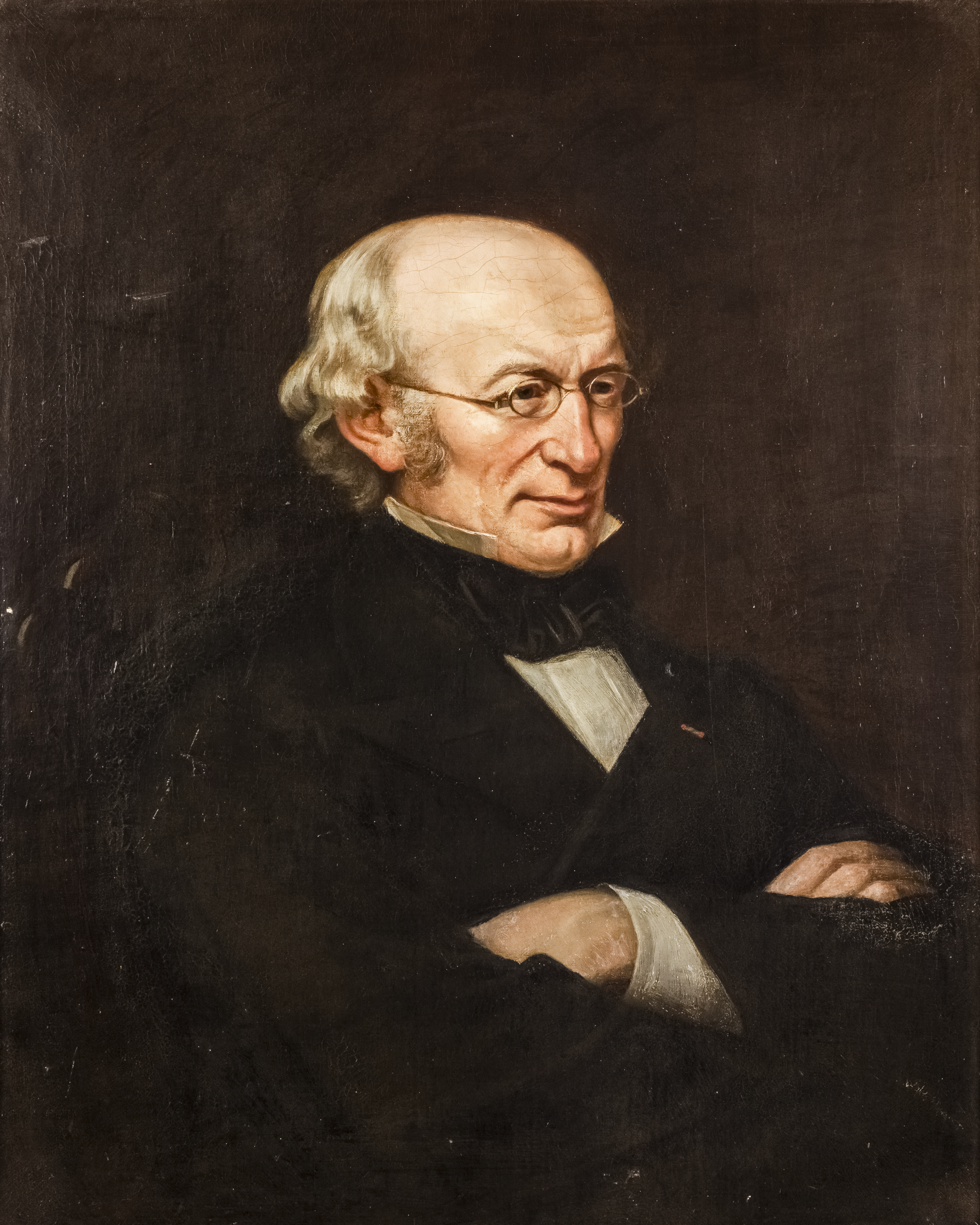
Johan Nicolai Madvig.

- 14 January – Anders Peter Westenholz, businessman and consul-general (born 1825)
- 30 April – Christian August Broberg, businessman and politician (born 1811)
- 15 October – Vilhelm Christian Holm, composer (born 1820)
- 12 December – Johan Nicolai Madvig, philologist and politician (born 1804)
