= 1971 in Danish television =

This is a list of Danish television related events from 1971.

== Births ==
- 20 February – Camilla Bendix, actress
- 12 April – Tomas Villum Jensen, actor
- 30 April – Louise Mieritz, actress
- 6 July – Mia Lyhne, actress
- 28 September – Mads Vangsø, comedian & TV & radio host
- 12 November – Annette Heick, singer, cartoon voice actress, journalist & TV host

== See also ==
- 1971 in Denmark
