= 1974 in Denmark =

- Decades: 1950s; 1960s; 1970s; 1980s; 1990s
- See also: Other events of 1974; List of years in Denmark

Events from the year 1974 in Denmark.

== Incumbents ==
- Monarch - Margrethe II
- Prime minister - Poul Hartling

== Events ==
=== Sports ===
- 14–20 August – Peder Pedersen wins gold in Men's sprint at the 1974 UCI Track Cycling World Championships.
- Fate unknown – KB wins the 1974 Danish 1st Division.
- Date unknown – The Denmark women's national football team wins the 1974 Women's Nordic Football Championship.

== Births ==
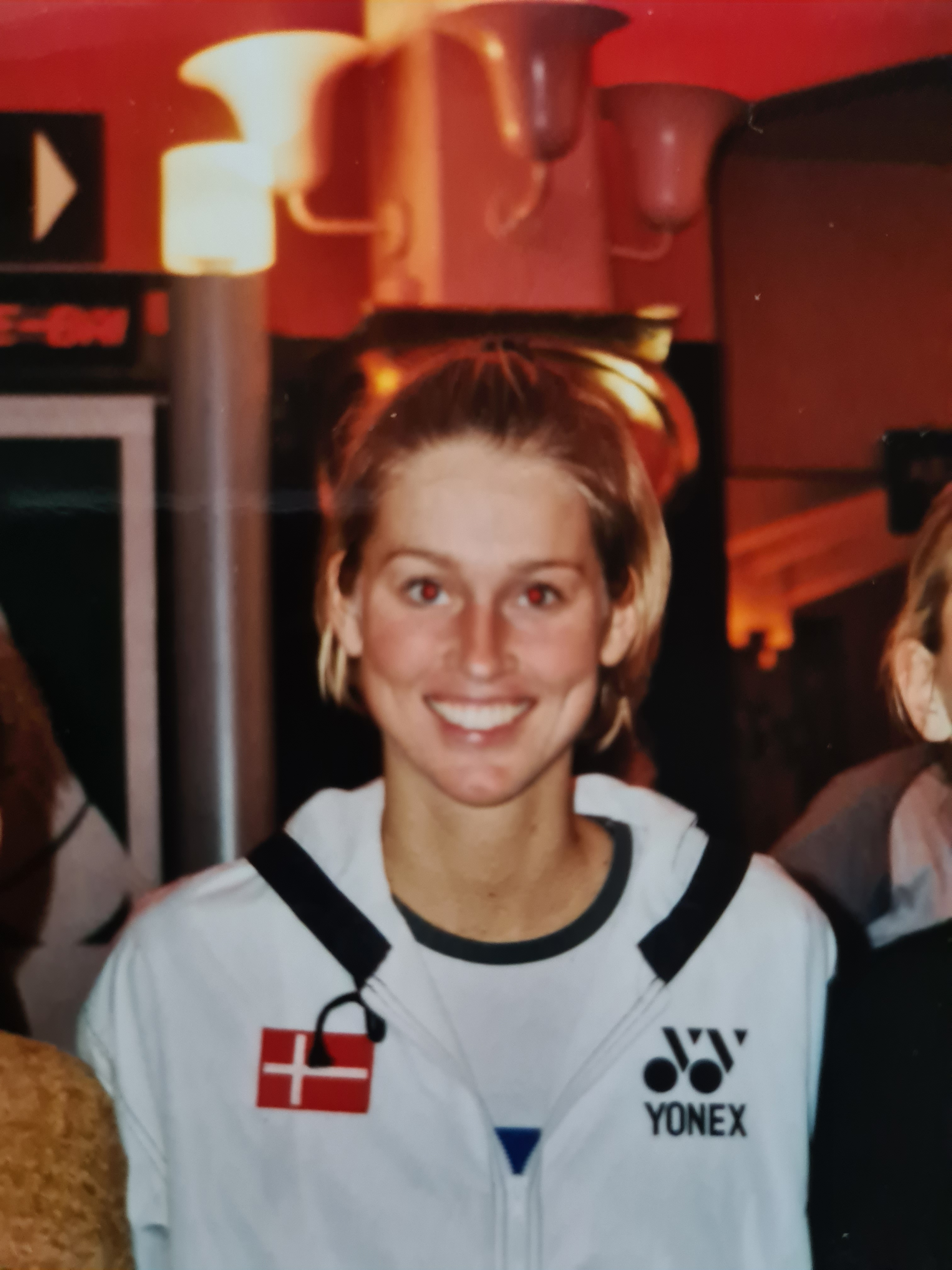
Camilla Martin.

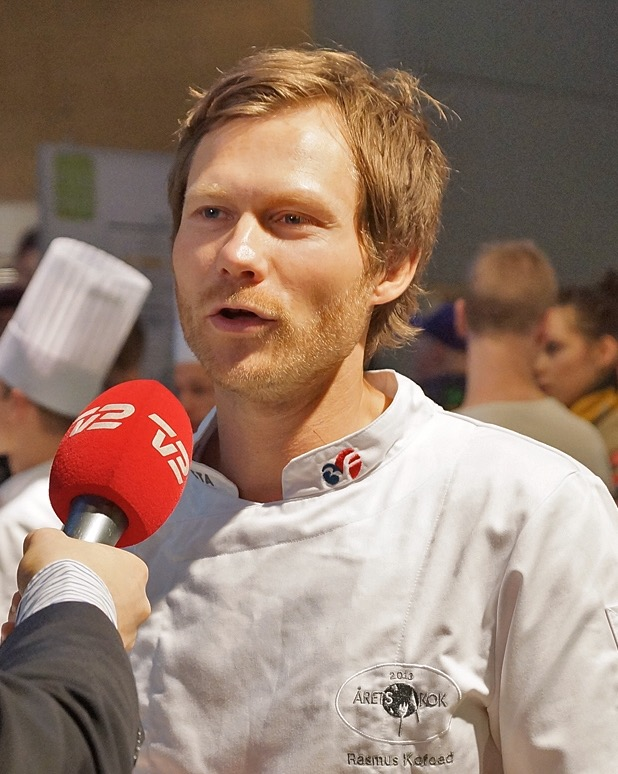
Rasmus Kofoed.

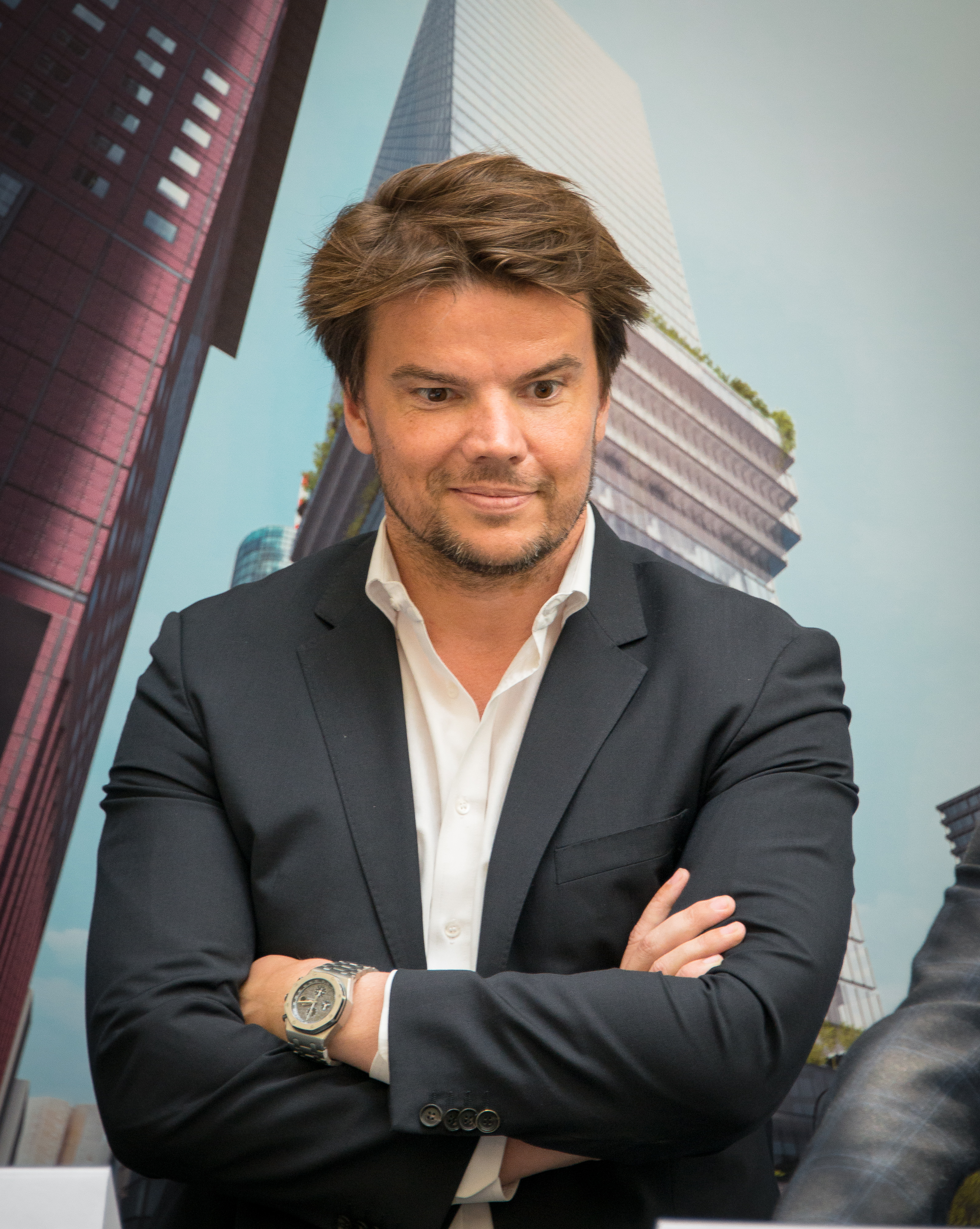
Vjarke Ingels.

=== January–March ===
- 4 January – Sonja Richter, actress
- 21 January – Lise Müller, politician
- 26 February – Mads Blangstrup, ballet dancer
- 7 March – Jeppe Nielsen, freestyle swimmer
- 15 March – Claus Jørgensen, race walker
- 23 March – Camilla Martin, badminton

=== April–June ===
- 6 April – Camilla Sacre-Dallerup, author, life coach, hypnotherapist and former ballroom dancer.
- 19 April – Jens Nordvig, economist, businessman
- 12 June – Jesper Just, visual artist
- 25 June – Morten Bisgaard, football player and coach

=== July–September ===
- 1 August – Jeppe Hein, artist
- 22 August – Rasmus Kofoed, chef and restaurateur
- 27 September – Janus Metz Pedersen, film director and documentary filmmaker.

=== October–December ===
- 2 October – Bjarke Ingels, architect
- 28 October – Peter Sommerm singer
- 29 October – Cecilie Thomsen, actress
- 31 October - Natasja Saad, rapper and reggae singer (dead 2007)
- 2 December – Laura Drasbæk, actress
- 24 December – Thure Lindhardt, actor

== Deaths ==
- 2 June – Tom Kristensen, poet, novelist, critic (born 1893)
- 26 December – Knudåge Riisager, composer (born 1897)

== See also ==
- 1974 in Danish television
