= 1978 in Denmark =

- Decades: 1950s; 1960s; 1970s; 1980s; 1990s
- See also: Other events of 1978; List of years in Denmark

Events from the year 1978 in Denmark.

== Incumbents ==
- Monarch – Margrethe II
- Prime minister – Anker Jørgensen

== Events ==
- 19 September – The 1978 electoral age referendum, leading to a lowering of the electoral age from 20 to 18 years.

=== Undated ===
- The death penalty is abolished for all crimes.

== Sports ==
=== Badminton ===
- 13–15 April — With two gold medals, two silver medals and one bronze medal, Denmark finishes as the second best nation at the 6th European Badminton Championships in Preston, England.
- Gentofte BK wins Europe Cup.

=== Cycling ===
- Donald Allan (AUS) and Danny Clark (AUS) win the Six Days of Copenhagen six-day track cycling race.

=== Other ===
- 2 September — Ole Olsen wins the 1978 Individual Speedway World Championship at Wembley Stadium in London.

== Births ==
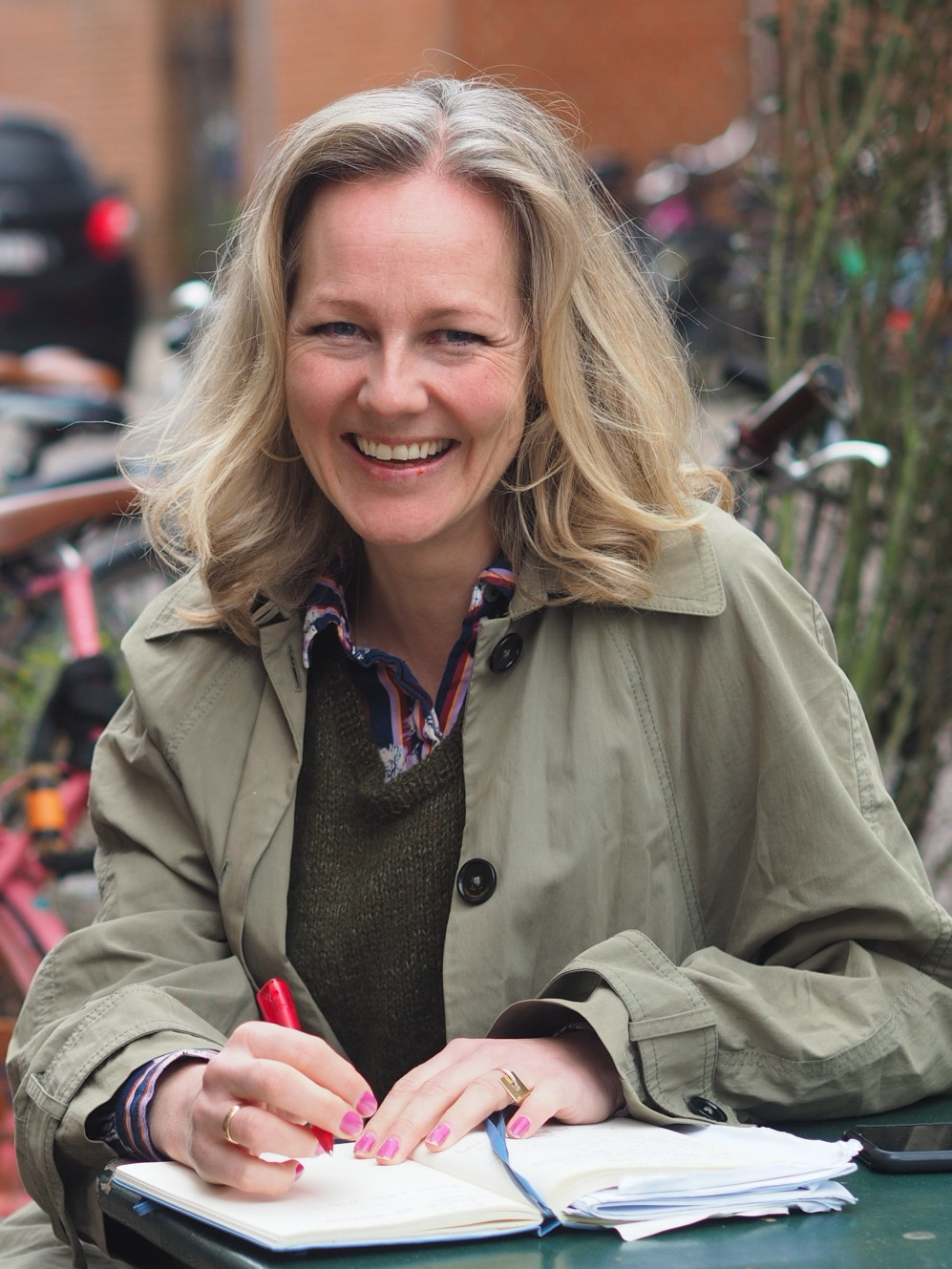
Ida Auken.

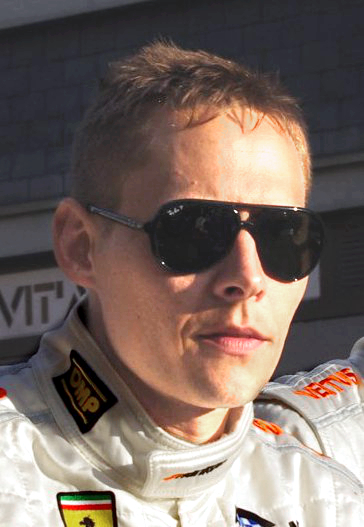
Allan Simonsen.

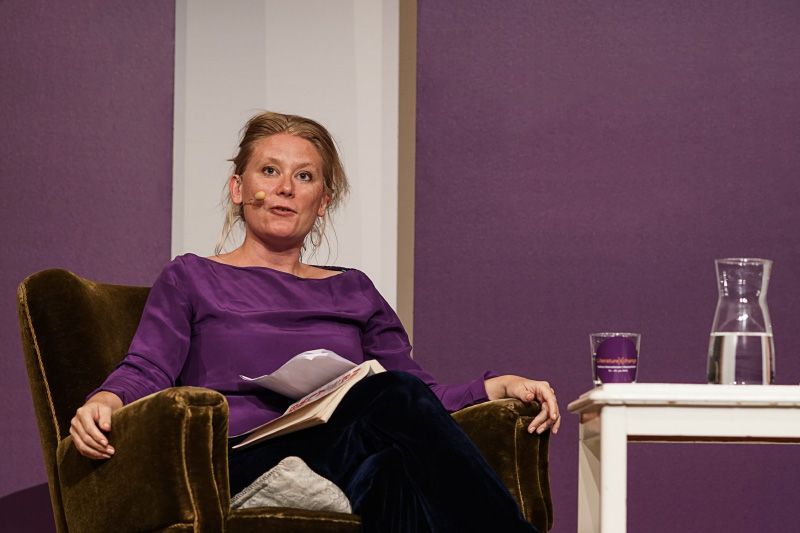
Puk Damsgård.

=== January–March ===
- 9 January — Christina Hembo, designer
- 20 January – Britt Raaby, freestyle swimmer
- 14 February – Rie Rasmussen, actress, film director, writer, model, and photographer
- 3 March – Nicolas Kiesa, racing driver
- 10 March – Kim Staal, Ice hockey player

=== April–June ===
- 3 April – Michael Gravgaard, football player
- 8 April – Christian Tafdrup, actor and filmmaker
- 22 April – Ida Auken, politician
- 26 April – Peter Madsen, footballer
- 30 April – Joachim Boldsen, handballer
- 1 May – Jakob Lange, architect
- 13 May – Jeanette Varberg. historian and curator

=== July–September ===
- 5 July – Allan Simonsen, racing driver
- 12 July – Katrine Fruelund, handball player
- 22 July – Dennis Rommedahl, football player
- 24 July – Ole Yde, fashion designer
- 18 September – Puk Damsgård, journalist

=== October–December ===
- 1 November – Lise Rønne, journalist and television presenter
- 23 November – Joachim Fischer Nielsen, badminton player
- 27 December – Jim Lyngvild, designer

== Deaths ==
- 1 March – Arne Sørensen, politician (born 1906)
- 18 March – Willy Hansen, cyclist (died 1906)
- 19 May – Carl Hansen, footballer (born 1898)
- 22 June – Jens Otto Krag, politician, former Danish prime minister (born 1914)

== See also ==
- 1978 in Danish television
