= 1961 in Denmark =

- Decades: 1940s; 1950s; 1960s; 1970s; 1980s
- See also: Other events of 1961; List of years in Denmark

The following are events of the year 1961 in Denmark.

== Incumbents ==
- Monarch – Frederik IX
- Prime minister – Viggo Kampmann

== Events ==
- 28 March – The Danish Maritime and Commercial Court is created by act.

== Sports ==
=== Badminton ===
- 14–17 March – All England Badminton Championships
  - Erland Kops wins gold in Men's Singles
  - Finn Kobberø and Jørgen Hammergaard Hansen win gold in Men's Doubles
  - Finn Kobberø and Kirsten Thorndahl win gold medal in Mixed Doubles.

== Births ==
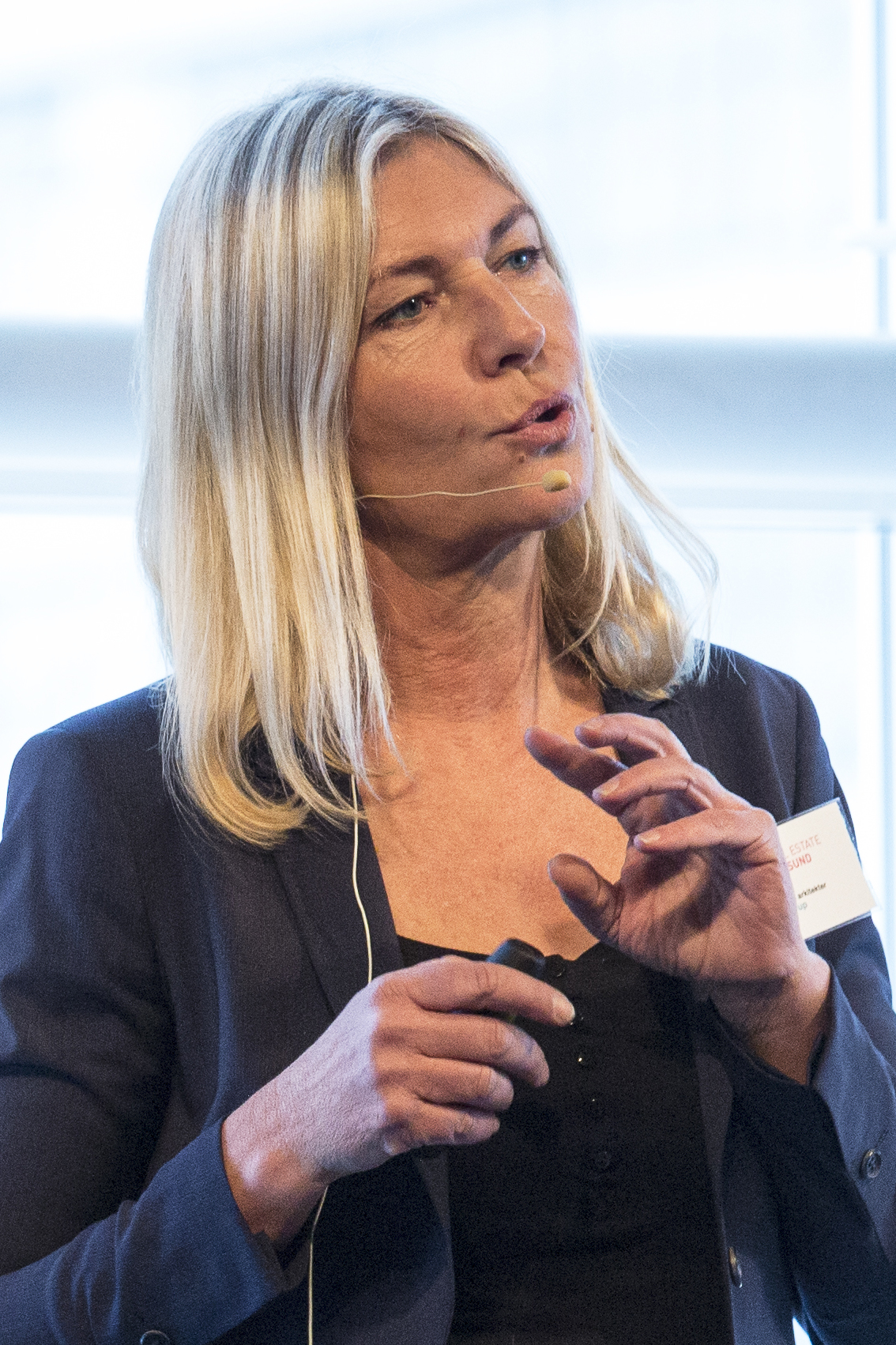
Dorte Mandrup.

=== January–March ===
- 3 March – Bodil Jørgensen, actress

=== April–June ===
- 8 April – Lars Bom, actor
- 21 May – Kåre Schultz, business executive
- 22 May – Dan Frost, cyclist
- 28 May – Frank Jensen, politician, lord mayor of Copenhagen

=== July–September ===
- 20 July – Tommy Christensen, footballer
- 26 July – [[]], architect
- 26 September – Charlotte Fich, actress

=== October–December ===
- 19 November – Pernille Svarre, athlete
- 28 December – Kent Nielsen, footballer and manager

== Deaths ==
=== January–March ===
- 21 March – Axel Salto, ceramist (born 1889)

=== April–June ===
- 21 April – Jean René Gauguin, sculptor (born 1881 in France)
- 6 June – Frants Nielsen, sport shooter, competitor at the 1912 Summer Olympics (born 1874)
- 20 June – Leif B. Hendil, journalist active in the Rescue of the Danish Jews during World War II (born 1898)

=== July–September ===
- 2 July – Pola Gauguin, painter and writer (born 1883)
- 11 July – Elof Risebye, painter (born 1892)
- 18 September – Hans Denver, sport shooter, competitor at the 1912 and 1920 Summer Olympics (born 1876)
- 19 September – Thorvald Pedersen, pharmacist and company founder (born 1887)

=== October–December ===
- 25 October – Mary Willumsen, photographer (born 1884)
- 8 November – Jais Nielsen, painter (born 1885)
- 20 December
  - Johannes Larsen, nature painter (born 1867)
  - Johan Frederik Steffensen, mathematician, statistician and actuary, professor of actuarial science at the University of Copenhagen 1923–43 (born 1873)

== See also ==
- 1961 in Danish television
