= 1961 in Danish television =

The following events related to Danish television occurred in 1961.

== Events ==
- 19 February – Dario Campeotto is selected to represent Denmark at the 1961 Eurovision Song Contest with his song "Angelique". He is selected to be the fifth Danish Eurovision entry during Dansk Melodi Grand Prix held at the Frederecia Teater in Fredericia.

== Births ==
- 26 September – Charlotte Fich, actress
- 8 December – Line Baun Danielsen, ice hockey player, journalist & TV host

== See also ==
- 1961 in Denmark
