= Ole Wanscher =

Danish furniture designer (1903–1985)

Ole Wanscher (16 September 1903 – 27 December 1985) was a Danish furniture designer. He was one of the leading figures in the Scandinavian Design movement (a part of Mid-Century Modernism), at a time when Scandinavian Design achieved worldwide popularity.

== Early life and education ==
Wanscher was born on 16 September 1903 in Frederiksberg, Copenhagen, the son of art historian Vilhelm Wanscher (1875-1961) and painter Laura K. Baagøe Zeuthen (1877-1974). He studied at the Danish School of Art and Design, and was particularly influenced by Prof. Kaare Klint.

== Design career ==
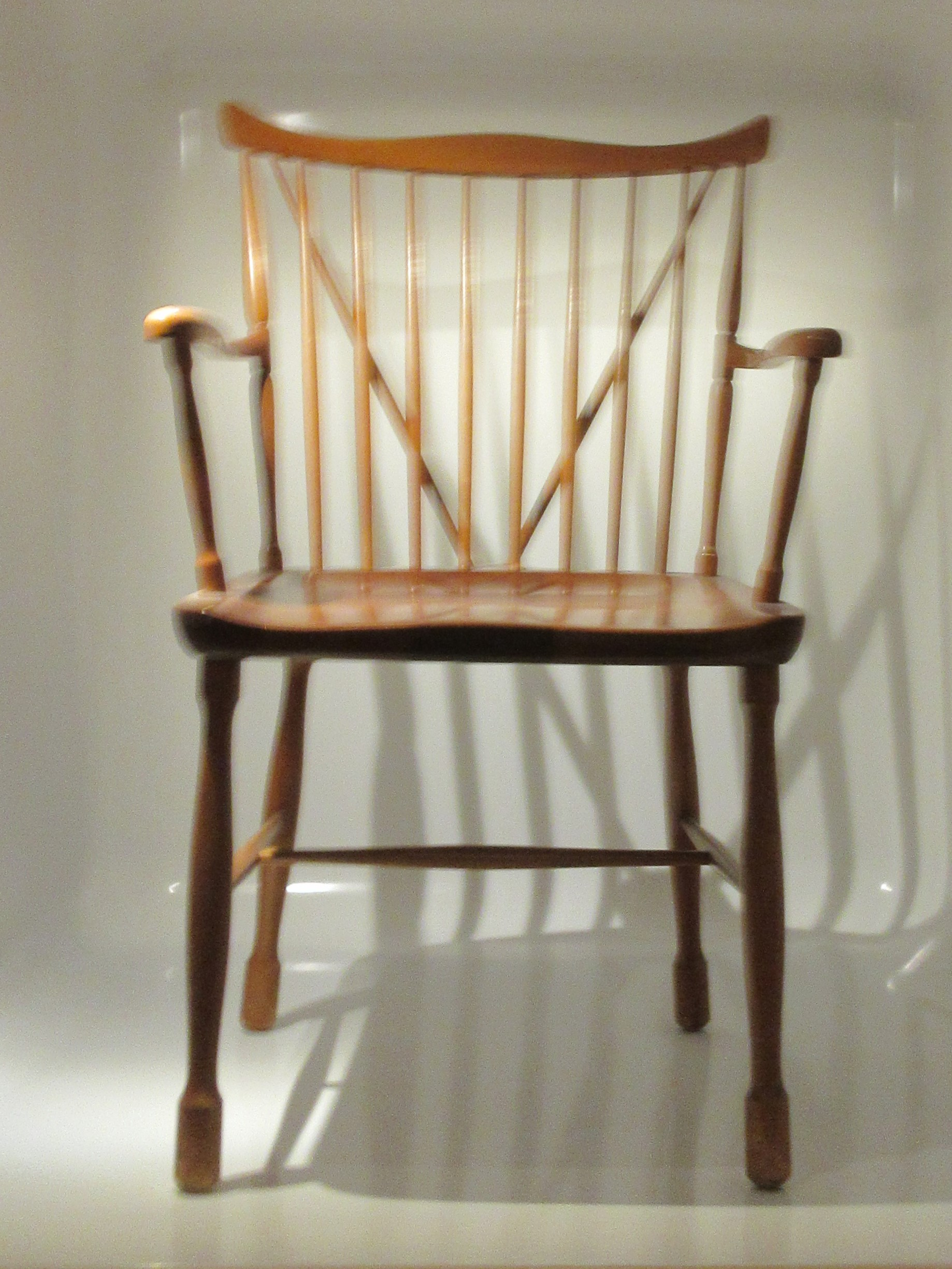
Windsor chair, 1942, Danish Design Museum, Copenhagen

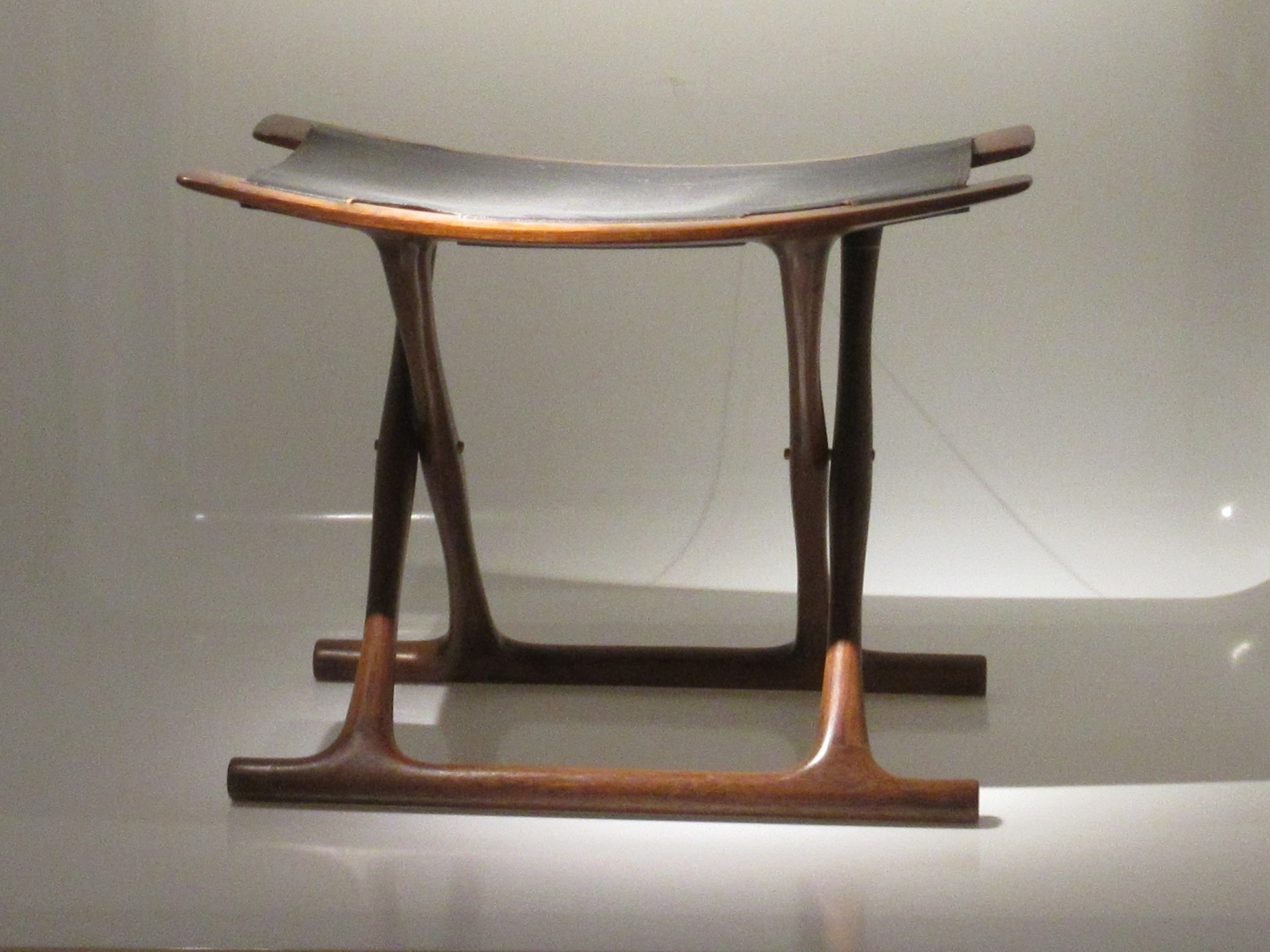
Folding stool, 1957, Danish Design Museum, Copenhagen

After completing his studies, Wanscher worked with Klint from 1924 to 1927, at which time he set up his own office, specializing in furniture design.

Throughout the 1930s and 1940s, Wanscher, working with master joiner A. J. Iversen, produced dozens of designs that are now seen as modern classics. In the 1950s, Wanscher left his private firm and began an association with P. Jeppesens Møbelfabrik A/S that would last for the rest of his professional life.

Like his mentor Kaare Klint, Wanscher was influenced by a variety of sources, from 18th century British design through the furniture design of Ancient Egypt. One of Wanscher's most famous pieces was his so-called "Egyptian Stool" of 1960. He was also influenced by Greek and Chinese design.

While many of Wanscher best known designs were built with master joiner A.J. Iversen, Wanscher also showed a particular interest in the mass production of furniture, and several of his pieces were designed with mass production in mind. One of Wanscher's best known designs is the teak easy chair designed for France & Son in 1951.

== Academia ==
Upon the death of Kaare Klint in 1955, Wanscher replaced Klint as professor at the Royal Danish Academy of Fine Arts, a post he held until his retirement in 1973. Taking a cue from his father, an art historian, Wanscher published several histories of furniture design during his time at the Royal Danish Academy of Fine Arts, including The History of the Art of Furniture and Five Thousand Years of Furniture.

== Reputation ==
Wanscher's work has remained popular with furniture collectors. It has been called "delicate", "elegant", and "orderly".

In 2003, Vance Trimble, a furniture dealer and collector, staged a retrospective of Wanscher's work in New York City, which was well received.

== Personal life ==
Wanscher married twice. His first wife was Hilda Dorothea Pestalozzi (2 March 1906 - 9 July 1992), a daughter of consul Wilhelm Pestalozzi (1861) and Ellen Nicoline Karberg (1871-1944). They married on 22 September 1932 but they were divorced in 1954. His second wife was architect Edith Weinreich (27 March 1918 - 15 January 1990), a daughter of director and later alderman of the Wood Carvers' Guild Gustav Weinreich (1886-1980) and Hertha Jørgensen (1885-1956). They were married on 29 March 1967 at Søllerød Town Hall.

He designed his own house at Gotfred Rodes Vej 5 in Charlottenlund in 1933. It was altered in 1943 and again in 1965.
