= 1891 in Denmark =

- Decades: 1870s; 1880s; 1890s; 1900s; 1910s
- See also: Other events of 1891; List of years in Denmark

Events from the year 1891 in Denmark.

== Incumbents ==
- Monarch – Christian IX
- Prime minister – J. B. S. Estrup

== Sports ==
- 3 May – Vejle Boldklub is founded.

== Births ==
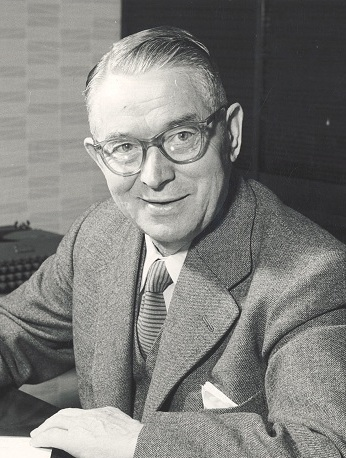
Ole Kirk Christiansen.

=== January–March ===
- 5 January – Grethe Glad, fashion designer and educator (died 1990)
- 5 February – Cai Gundelach, equestrian (died 1954)
- 2 March – Gerda Henning, designer (died 1951)

=== April–June ===
- 7 April – Ole Kirk Christiansen, entrepreneur and businessman, inventor of Lego (d.1958)
- 27 May – Aage Redal, actor (born 1950)
- 11 June – Mogens Bøggild, sculptor (died 1987)

=== October–December ===
- 1 October – Svend Methling, actor (died 1977)

== Deaths ==
=== January–March ===
- 11 March – Jens Levin Tvede, distillerm industrialist and (died 1830)

=== April–June ===
- 8 April – Elise Holst, stage actress (born 1811)
- 9 June – Ludvig Lorenz, mathematician and physicist (born 1829)

=== July–September ===
- 15 August – Louise Sahlgreenm actress (born 1818)
- 20 September – Joseph Glæser, composer and organist (born 1835)

=== October–December ===
- 28 November – Christen Berg, politician (born 1829)
- 21 December – Georg Emil Hansen, photographer (born 1833)
