= Gustav Weinreich =

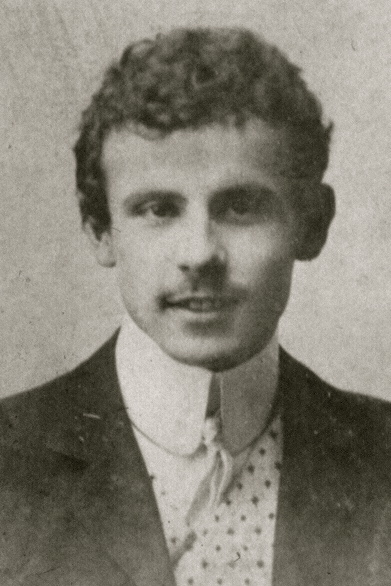
Gustav Weinreich

Gustav Alfred Emil Weinreich (1886–1980) was a Danish woodcarver and furniture maker in Copenhagen, and a leader in the craftsmans' guilds of his day.

== Family life ==
Weinreich was born in Copenhagen on 12 October 1886, the second child of Ferdinand Emil Weinreich and Vilhelmine Frederikke Bolette Sivertsen (1852–1893). Both his older sister Amanda and younger sister Valborg emigrated to the United States, but Gustav remained in Denmark working with his father as a craftsman. Gustav married Hertha Athalia Jørgensen in 1909 and they had 3 children together: Benny Emil, Edith Kate, and Willie Marquard. His daughter Edith Kate, an architect, eventually married Ole Wanscher, a noted Danish furniture designer and author. Weinreich later married secondly Merry Mignon Petersson, and they had two children together: Kirsten Anelise Edith and Bjorn Allen Benny.
The Weinreich's lived at Dronninggårds Allè 37 in Holte, Copenhagen. Later he lived at Borgergade 142 in Copenhagen, and died on 6 September 1980.

== Career ==
After apprenticing with Larsen & Andersens Møbelsnedkeri, Kbh and studying at the Technical Institute (Teknisk Institut), he was an independent master craftsman from 1909–1917. Between 1917–1928 he was the manager of A/S Lysberg & Hansen, a leading Danish furniture maker. In 1928 Weinreich established his own firm, A/S Normina.

Through Normina, Weinreich worked with several noted furniture designers, including his son in law Wanscher and Jens Risom. He also worked on several high profile properties and customers, including the Wivex and Nimb restaurants at Tivoli, and the Marienlyst, Postgården and Terminus hotels. In 1945 A/S Normina was located at 40 Holger Danskers Way in Copenhagen.

Weinreich also carved a number of wooden crucifixes that appear at various roadside locales throughout Denmark, including at least one near Nødebo and another near Maltofte that was stolen in the 1970s and replaced by a local carver.

Later, Weinreich became Director, and then Alderman for the Woodworkers' Guild (Billedskærerlauget) until 1952 after which he became an honorary Alderman. At the guild he was also director of the apprenticeship committee. Gustav was a member of the board of the Craftsman's Association (Håndværkerforeningen) from 1940–1959 and worked on issues for retired workers.
