= 1971 in Denmark =

- Decades: 1950s; 1960s; 1970s; 1980s; 1990s
- See also: Other events of 1971; List of years in Denmark

Events from the year 1971 in Denmark.

== Incumbents ==
- Monarch – Frederik IX
- Prime minister – Jens Otto Krag

== Sports ==
- August 15–September 5 – The 1971 Women's World Cup in Association football (an event not recognized by FIFA) is staged in Mexico: Denmark will be the winners.
- 10 September – Ole Olsen wins the 1971 Individual Speedway World Championship.

== Births ==
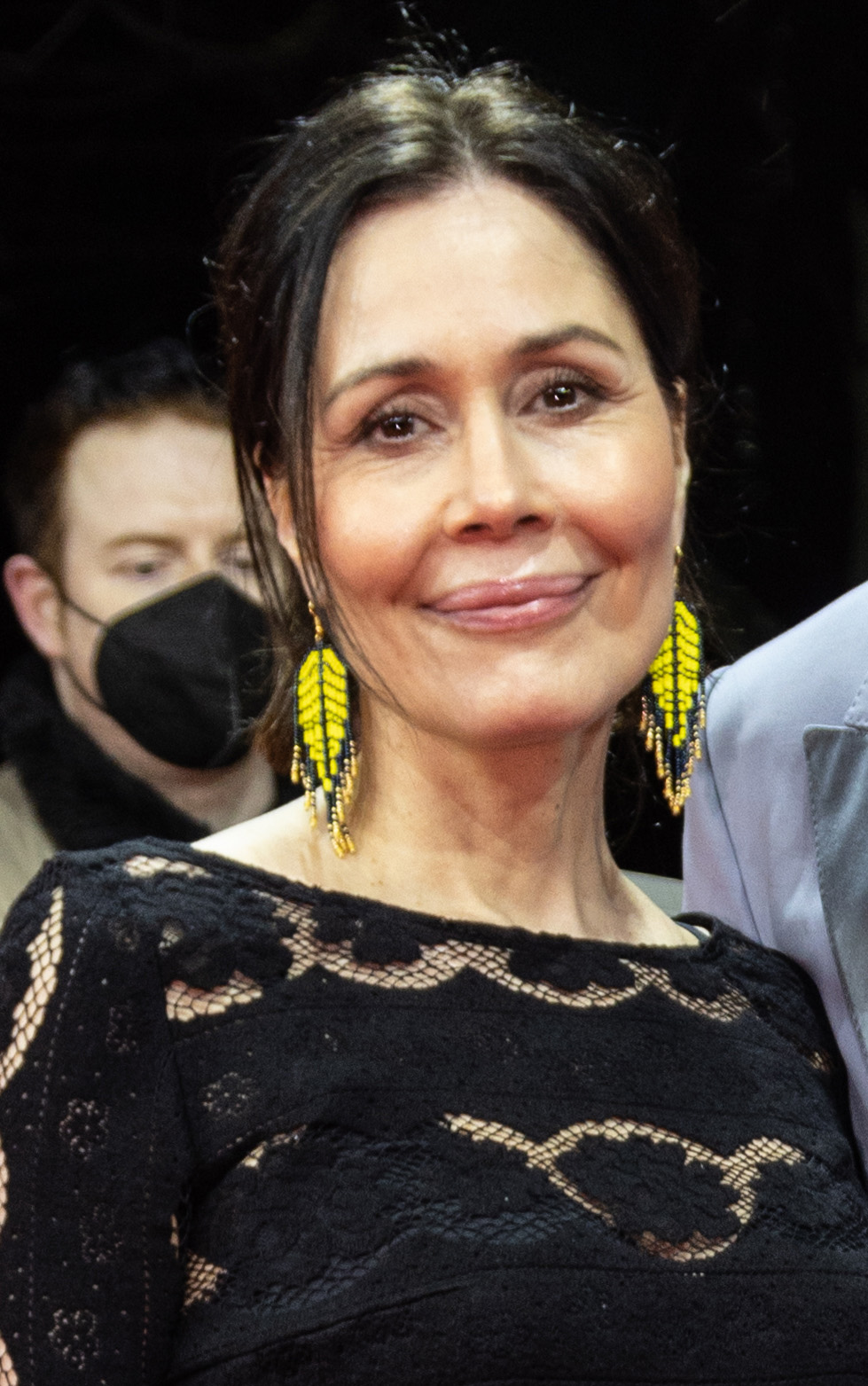
Nukâka Coster-Waldau.

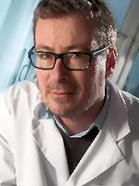
Eske Willerslev.

=== January–March ===
- 12 January - Peter Madsen, convicted murderer, former engineer and entrepreneur
- 13 January – Caspar Phillipson, actor
- 7 February - Nicolai Wammen, politician
- 18 February - Thomas Bjørn, professional golfer
- 23 February - Nukâka Coster-Waldau, actress
- 25 February - Morten Wieghorst, football coach and former football player
- 13 March - Allan Nielsen, footballer

=== April–June ===
- 5 May
  - Helene Kirkegaard, badminton player
  - Anette Hoffmann, handball player
- 21 May – Kristian Jensen, politician
- 5 June
  - Rane Willerslev, anthropologist
  - Eske Willerslev, biologist
- 24 June – Thomas Helveg. footballer

=== July–September ===
- 23 August – Mads Fuglede, journalist and politician

=== October–December ===
- 5 November – Michael Jansson, economist
- 30 November – Pia Olsen Dyhr, politician
- 31 December – Søren Pape Poulsen, politician (died 2024)

== Deaths ==
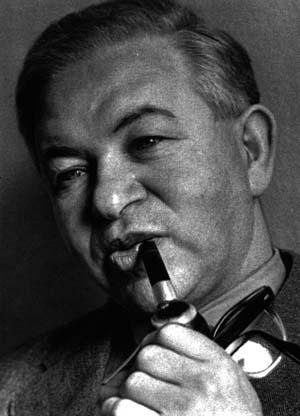
Arne Jacobsen.

=== January–March ===
- 24 March – Arne Jacobsen, architect, furniture designer (born 1902)

=== April–June ===
- 1 May – Ejnar Mikkelsen, Polar explorer and author (born 1880)

=== July–September ===
- 13 September – Harald Lander, dancer (born 1905)

=== October–December ===
- 6 October – Hans Christian Hagedorn, pharmacologist and Novo Nordisk co-founder (born 1888)
- 10 October – Hans Rasmus Hansen, politician (born 1896)

== See also ==
- 1971 in Danish television
