= Jeanette Varberg =

Danish archaeologist and curator (born 1978)

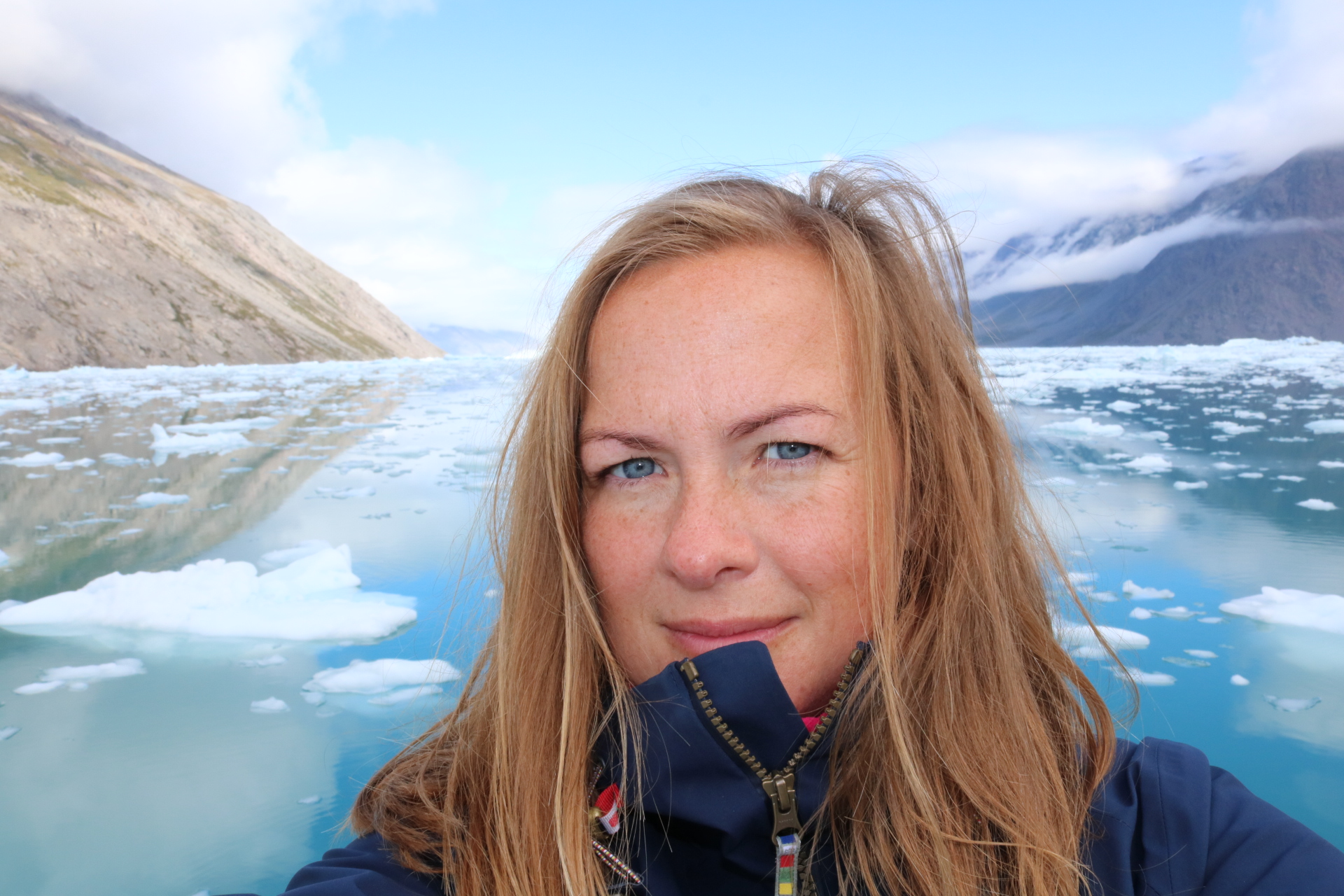
- Varberg in 2017
- Born: May 13, 1978 (age 47); Odense, Denmark
- Occupations: Archaeologist, Writer, Curator

Jeanette Varberg (born 13 May 1978) is a Danish archaeologist, writer and curator who discovered that glass beads found in Denmark had originated in Egypt and Mesopotamia. She published Fortidens Slagmarker - krig og konflikt fra stenalder til vikingetid (Battlefields of the Past - Wars and Conflicts from the Stone Age to the Viking Period), which won DR's Rosenkjæer Prize in 2014 and the Blixen Prize in 2015. Since February 2017, she has been a curator at the National Museum of Denmark.

== Biography ==
Jeanette Varberg was born on 13 May 1978 in Odense, Denmark. Varberg became interested in archaeology from her early childhood when her mother read a book to her about the young Egyptian pharaoh Tutankhamun. She went on to study prehistoric archaeology at Aarhus University, graduating as Mag.art in 2006. The same year, she joined the Third Galathea Expedition which investigated unexplored territories such as the islands of Papua New Guinea. In 2007, she was appointed curator of the bronze age department at Moesgaard Museum near Aarhus. Her responsibility was to develop a more effective approach to the museum's presentations.

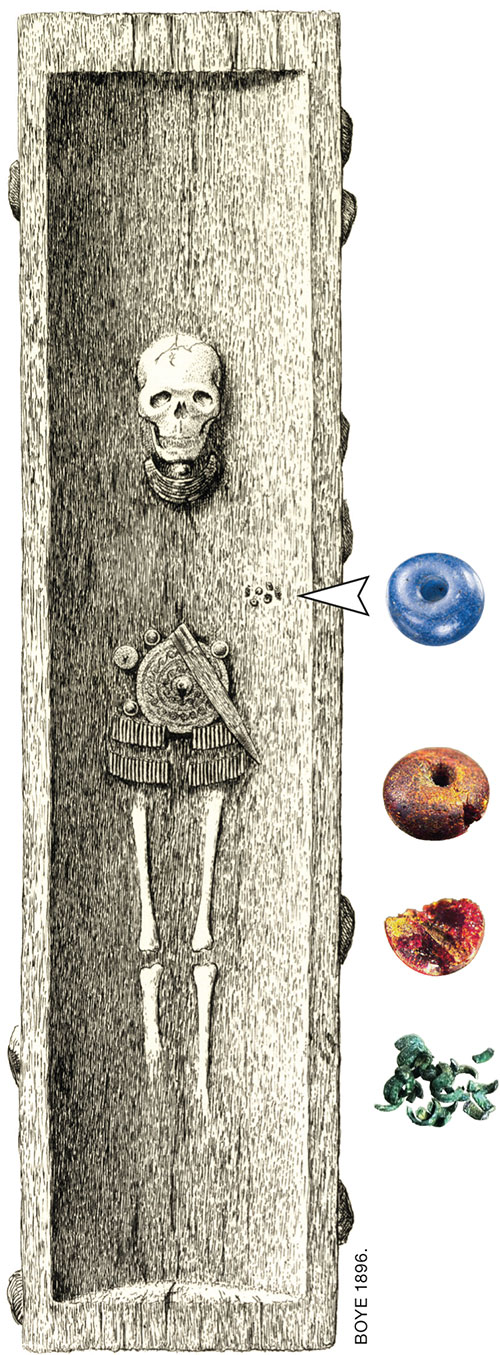
Varburg's sketch of where the beads were found

In 2014, Varberg showed that 23 glass beads found in Denmark had originated in Syria, Egypt and Iraq some 3,400 years ago. This was evidence of migrations on a global scale dating back to the Bronze Age.

In 2014, she published Fortidens Slagmarker - krig og konflikt fra stenalder til vikingetid (Battlefields of the Past - Wars and Conflicts from the Stone Age to the Viking Period), followed in 2017 by Mennesket har altid vandret (People Have Always Migrated).

After spending over 10 years at the Moesgaard Museum, where she was responsible for the Bronze Age department, Varberg took up a new appointment as a curator at the National Museum of Denmark in February 2018. She will also help to modernize the museum's presentations by developing radio and television programmes. The museum's director Rane Willerslev recognizes her talents: "Jeanette Varberg is without doubt one of Denmark's most effective communicators of history and science."

== Awards ==
Jeanette Varberg received DR's Rosenkjær Prize in 2014 and the Blixen Prize in 2015.
