= Dida Dederding =

Danish doctor and academic (1889–1955)

- Born: Dida Dagmar Mary Hansen; 6 January 1889; Copenhagen, Denmark
- Died: 13 November 1955 (aged 66); Ordrup parish, Denmark
- Education: University of Copenhagen
- Occupations: Doctor, academic, sex educator
- Spouse: Poul Vilhelm Dederding (m. 1916)

Dida Dagmar Mary Dederding (née Hansen; 6 January 1889 – 13 November 1955) was a Danish doctor and academic who specialised in inner ear pathology and women's sexual health. She was also known for her work on Ménière's disease, and her theory that it was caused by a water imbalance.

== Early and personal life ==
Dida Dagmar Mary Hansen was born on 6 January 1889 in Copenhagen to Marie Laurine Ferdinandine Vonsild and Hans Christian Hansen. She was raised in a middle-class household and attended Laura Engelhardt's School, from which she graduated in 1908. Following this, she began studying medicine at the University of Copenhagen, earning her bachelor's degree in 1916.

On 27 October 1916, she married lawyer Poul Vilhelm Dederding (1889–1957) in Copenhagen. The couple had no children. She was also a member of the Conservative People's Party.

== Career ==
After completing her medical studies, Dederding began teaching first aid to Girl Scouts and was surprised by their lack of knowledge about their own bodies. As a result, she began lecturing on marriage and sexual health topics at schools, women's associations, and workplaces across Denmark. Although her original aim was to become a gynaecologist, she chose instead to train as an ear specialist due to her own experiences of impaired hearing and recurring dizziness. Despite this, she continued to lecture and teach sexual health. Throughout the 1920s, she campaigned for reforms to sexual health. She was also a member of the feminist Danish Women's Society.

In 1925, Dederding began working at Copenhagen Municipal Hospital as Sidney H. Mygind's assistant and later collaborator. Under Mygind, Dederding began treating patients with Ménière's disease from 1926 and observed its effects outside of the auditory system, including depression, gastrointestinal issues, insomnia, rheumatism, Vasomotor Rhinitis, among others. She also noted that 91% of their patients suffered from headaches. Dederding theorised that the disease was caused by an imbalance of water, and that symptoms could be eased by exercise, massage and reduced water and salt consumption.

In 1939, she published the book Kvinden omkring de halvtreds ("Women around their fifties"), to educate women about sexuality and their own bodies. In the book, she criticised women's attitudes towards menstruation, resulting in the lack of medical attention to issues surrounding it. Two years later, Dederding followed this with a sexual education book Sundhedslære for unge kvinder ("Health Education for Young Women") aimed at women. With this publication, she wrote about the negative impacts of puberty on both sexes and the importance of adolescents regulating their own sexual desires to prevent misconduct in adult life. It also focused on maintaining and improving women's health not only by moderate exercise and healthy nutrition, but also by sexuality, which she considered to be the key to a happy marriage.

== Death ==
Dederding died on 13 November 1955 in Ordrup parish, at the age of 66.

== Sources ==
- Weßel, Merle (2018). An Unholy Union? Eugenic Feminism in the Nordic Countries, ca. 1890-1940. University of Helsinki. ISBN 9789515141040.
