= Axel Aabrink =

Danish painter

Axel Conrad Petersen Aabrink (April 17, 1887 – February 2, 1965) was a Danish painter.

== Biography ==
His parents were Jens Christian Aabrink and Anna Jensen. Aabrink was educated at technical school and at the school of Kristian Zahrtmann. He was a private pupil of H. Gronvold. Aabrink was a close friend of artist Olaf Rude and was influenced by the works of Albert Gottschalk throughout his career.

On September 10, 1925, Aabrink married Emilie Louise Petersen, the adopted daughter of Martin Pedersen and Anna Dorthea Nielsen. Pedersen managed a poorhouse (he was "Fattigaards bestyrer"). Her nickname was 'Mille'.

Axel Aabrink worked as a furniture maker's apprentice to make money for his education as a painter. He became a journeyman under Georg Moller in Copenhagen. He went to art school at night. He was friends with Olaf Rude, but was deeply influenced by Albert Gottschalk's art. From the beginning of the 1920s he lived in Jylland around Hobro, where he lived in peaceful surroundings.

Aabrink was shy and reclusive, spending most of his life painting landscapes and forest scenes from around the areas he lived in. Besides painting, Aabrink was also a successful carpenter and did many pieces of furniture for the Nord Company.

Aabrink had an exhibition of his work in 1919.

== See also ==
- Art of Denmark
