= Nicolai Nørregaard =

Danish chef and restaurateur (born 1979)

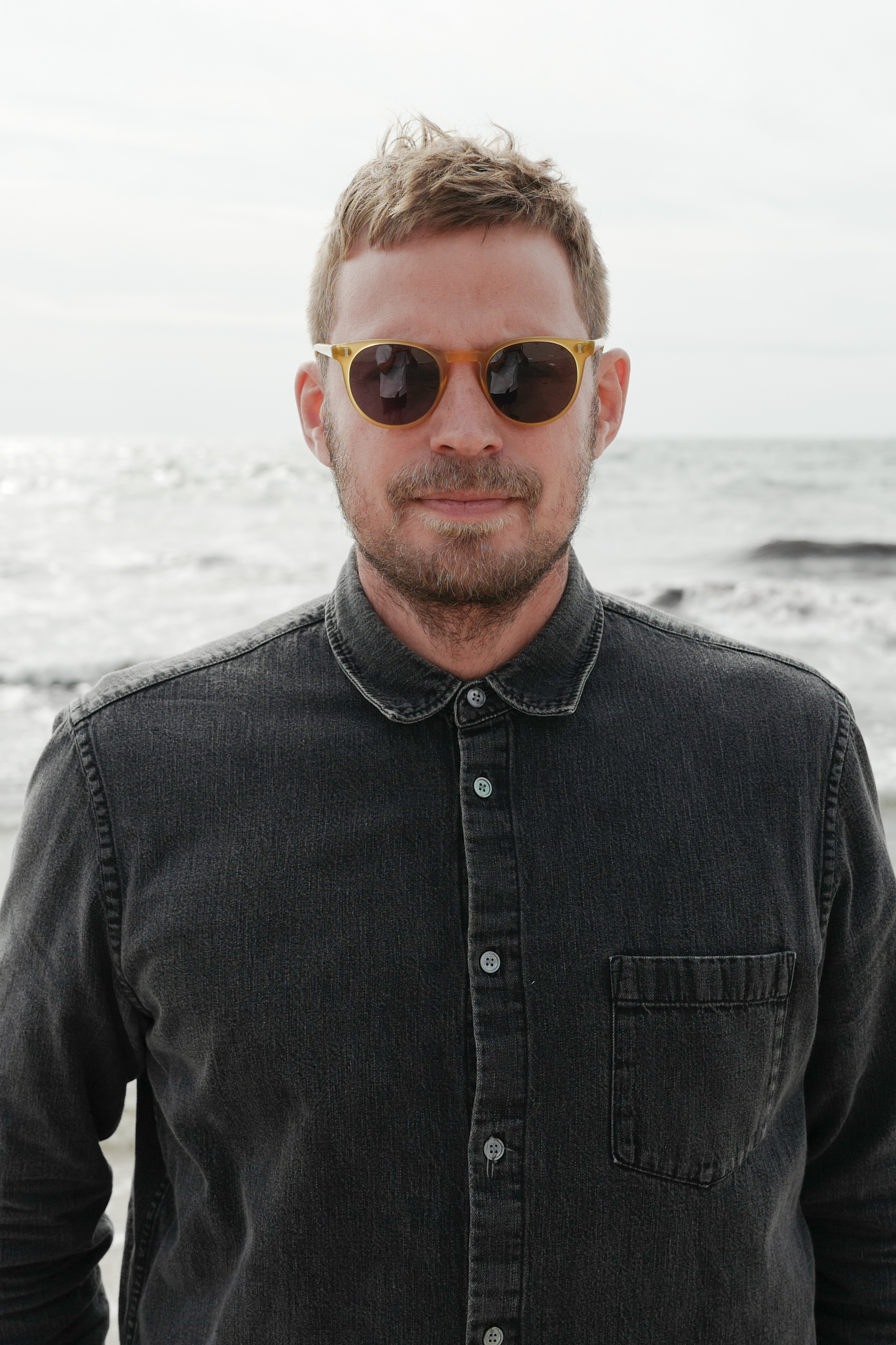
Nicolai Nørregaard on the beach outside Kadeau Bornholm

Nicolai Nørregaard (born 1 October 1979) is the head chef and co-owner of restaurant Kadeau in Copenhagen and Bornholm. He was born and raised on the island of Bornholm, a small Danish Island in the Baltic Sea. As a child he was highly influenced by his grandfather’s cooking, who cultivated and grew his own vegetables, caught much of his own seafood, and preserved ingredients so that he could remain self-sufficient during the winter months.

== Biography ==
Nørregaard grew up in Svaneke on the island of Bornholm. He cooked with his grandfather from an early age. He intended to study architecture but began to work at restaurant Svaneke Pakhus in the summer time. He has no formal education as a chef.

Kadeau Bornholm was founded in 2007 by Nicolai Nørregaard and Rasmus Kofoed, both raised on the Eastern coast of Bornholm. The pair acquired the restaurant Strandhytten and opened Kadeau a few months later. The restaurant features expansive views of the pristine beaches of Sømarken and has successfully retained one Michelin star since 2016. Bornholm is a small island in the Baltic Sea, just off the coast of Sweden, Bornholm is essentially a large rock, with its very own special microclimate. Nicknamed the Sunshine Island, Spring sometimes takes a little longer to arrive but once the sun settles in, the island heats up and maintains its heat until late in the autumn, allowing fruits such as figs, peaches and mulberries to ripen completely.

A key aspect of Bornholm's cuisine that has become a cornerstone of the Kadeau kitchen are the smokehouses on the island – particularly Nicolai’s uncle’s smokehouse on the West coast of the island. The smokehouses mark the island’s landscape with their large and beautiful chimneys, however only ten of them still remain as working smokehouses nowadays. Nicolai’s uncle was one of the last remaining fish smokers who would use the traditional method of cold and hot smoking fish in an open chimney, a lengthy process that means that one must stay by the fire all day long, to ensure no flames erupt from the embers.

As one of the fore-runners in the Nordic food movement, these ways of cooking – very traditional in Bornholm – are what inspired Kadeau and are the foundation of Nicolai’s cooking.

Kadeau is a restaurant that follows the seasons. In the summer, the team picks from the restaurant’s garden, and forages in the forests and on the beaches of Bornholm — the fresh produce is used in both restaurants in the summertime. The menu is constantly evolving through the growing season to ensure it truly reflects the produce growing on the island, from the wild and the garden. A large part of the summer is also spent preserving the abundance of the summer’s growth – this way when winter sets in, the restaurant’s larder is well stocked, and the menus can continue to celebrate Bornholm’s finest ingredients.

Kadeau Copenhagen was founded in 2011 and is now located in the old Christianshavn area of the city. With two distinct seasons throughout the year, the kitchen showcases the best produce and food traditions of Bornholm with a clear focus on foraging and preservation. It has successfully retained two Michelin stars since 2018. Today, Kadeau is open on Bornholm during the summer months – from May to September – and in Copenhagen all year round.
