= String Quartet No. 1 (Nielsen) =

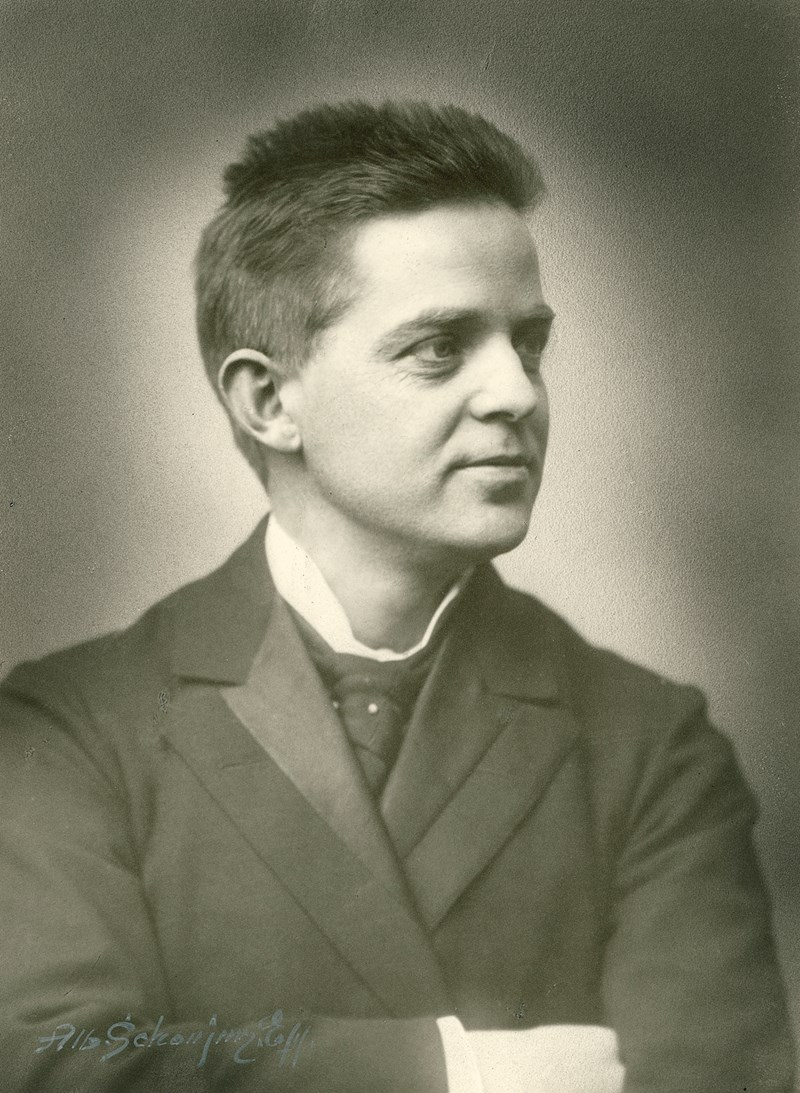
Carl Nielsen in 1901

Carl Nielsen's String Quartet No. 1 in G minor, Op. 13, was first performed privately on 18 December 1889 in Copenhagen. It was the first of Nielsen's four string quartets in the official series.

== Background ==
Originally written in 1889, the piece was later slightly revised for its first public performance on 3 February 1898 in the smaller hall at the Odd Fellows Mansion in Copenhagen under the leadership of violinist Anton Svendsen. In particular, Nielsen added a "Résumé" section in the finale, bringing together themes from the first, third and fourth movements. Although arranged at short notice, the concert, which was devoted to works by Nielsen, was well attended. The other pieces in the programme were: the Humoresque-Bagatelles for piano, the Symphonic Suite, Opus 8, and the Sonata for Violin and Piano in A major, Opus 9.

Published in 1900, it was dedicated to Johan Svendsen on the occasion of his 60th birthday.

== Music ==
After the tension of the first theme, the cello introduces a more lyrical secondary theme. The modulated central development is broken by strident chords which lead into a short recapitulation, the second theme now being played by the first violin. Opening in E♭ major, the lilting Andante evolves into a central section in G minor with a clear shift in key. The Scherzo in C minor is dominated by the central G major Trio with its characteristic bass. The Finale contains a résumé of the main themes of the third and first movements, set in counterpoint against each other and, in an attempt at cyclic unity, ends with the main theme of the first movement.

With a duration of 26 minutes, the quartet is divided into four movements:

1. Allegro energico
2. Andante amoroso
3. Scherzo: Allegro molto
4. Finale: Allegro (inquieto)

== Performances today ==
On the basis of information from the Carl Nielsen Society, the String Quartet in G minor is among the more popular of Nielsen's works and is the most frequently performed of his string quartets.
