= Kirsten Gloerfelt-Tarp =

Member of the Folketing for Eastern Copenhagen constituency
- In office 30 October 1945 – 15 November 1960

Personal details
- Born: Kirsten Gjessing Gloerfelt-Tarp; 1 December 1889 Copenhagen, Denmark
- Died: 30 March 1977 (aged 87) Gentofte, Denmark
- Party: Danish Social Liberal Party
- Spouse: Bror Vigo Valfred Globerfelt-Tarp (m. 1927; died 1958)
- Children: 1
- Education: N. Zahle's School
- Alma mater: University of Copenhagen
- Occupation: Economist; Office manager; Women's rights activist

Kirsten Gjessing Gloerfelt-Tarp (1 December 1889 – 30 March 1977) was a Danish economist, politician, office manager and women's rights activist. She was chairwoman of the Kvinderådet from 1931 to 1946, head of section at the Danish Labour and Factory Inspectorate (today the Danish Working Environment Authority) from 1938 to 1958 and represented the Eastern Copenhagen constituency of the Folketing for the Danish Social Liberal Party from 1945 to 1960. Globerfelt-Tarp was active on committees and commissions focused on social and women's issues, fought for the position of women in the labour market during the mass unemployment of the 1930s and took part in humanitarian activities.

== Early life ==
Gloerbelt-Tarp was born in Copenhagen, Denmark on 1 December 1889, and came from an upper class family. Her father was the wholesaler Hans Jørgen Gjessing and her mother was Karen Margrethe Stadfeldt. Globerfelt-Tarp graduated from N. Zahle's School in 1909. She enrolled at the University of Copenhagen, studying economics because she was interested in social issues. Globertfelt-Tarp graduated from the university with a Master of Science degree in 1915.

== Career ==
Following a brief stint working at the Department of Statistics (today Statistics Denmark), she became an assistant at the Danish Labour and Factory Inspectorate (now the Danish Working Environment Authority) in 1916 and was allowed to supervise the women employees under Annette Vedel. Globerfelt-Tarp initially worked at a tinplate factory in Odense for one month. She then worked as a factory inspector at the Danish Labour and Factory Inspectorate from 1921 to 1938 and was promoted to head of section in December 1938, succeeding Clara Back in the post. Globerfelt-Tarp was primarily tasked with social and economic issues. She left the Danish Labour and Factory Inspectorate in 1958. Globerfelt-Tarp was a member of the board of representatives of the Danish Association for Social Policy in 1933 and was appointed chairwoman of the Danish Women's Social Service in May 1940.

In 1925 Globerfelt-Tarp became a member of the board of the Kvinderådet and was its chairwoman from 1931 to 1946 after Henni Forchhammer (who selected her for an international committee on the interests of women) stood down as chairwoman. She was appointed its honorary president in 1946. In the role, Globerfelt-Tarp she fought for the position of women in the labour market during the mass unemployment of the 1930s and participated in humanitarian activities. She helped children affected by the Spanish Civil War. Together with Thora Daugaard and Mélanie Oppenhejm, Globerfelt-Tarp got around 300 Jewish children from Central Europe into Danish rural homes for Finnish children during the Winter War and did social work across Denmark during the Second World War. From 1927 to 1938, Globerfelt-Tarp was a six-time participant in the Geneva conferences of the International Labour Organization (ILO) as an technical advisor to the Danish government's delegation and she did so again following the Second World War. She was against any special protection for women workers, such as banning women from working night shifts. Globerfelt-Tarp favoured publicly financed, not company-financed, maternity leave.

Globerfelt-Tarp stood for election to the Eastern Copenhagen constituency of the Folketing as a representative of the Danish Social Liberal Party (RV) at the 1945 Danish Folketing election. She won election on 30 October 1945 and was one of eight women elected to parliament. Globerfelt-Tarp was re-elected each year until the 1960 Danish general election on 15 November 1960. She was active on committees and commissions focused on social and women's issues, such as taxation, pregnancy, abortion, wages, housing, maternity leave and single mothers. Globerfelt-Tarp was a member of the Nordic Council association. She was twice a substitute member of the Parliamentary Assembly of the Council of Europe from 1949 to 1951 and again from 1954 to 1960. Globerfelt-Tarp was a member of the editorial board of the Danish Workers' Inspection for the Pas på magazine between 1956 and 1961. She was deputy chairwoman of the RV parliamentary group from 1957 to 1960 and was a member of the ILO's expert committee on women's work until 1960.

During her career, Globerfelt-Taro was the author of a number of articles in professional journals and anthologies. She was co-author and editor of the statistical-sociological work Kvinden i Samfundet in 1937, its English edition called Women in the Community in 1939 and the book's second edition in 1953. Globerfelt-Taro was co-author of Arbejderbeskyttelse in 1943 and Kvinderne og valgrretten in 1965.

== Personal life ==
She was married to fellow economist Bror Vigo Valfred Globerfelt-Tarp from 13 August 1927 until his death on 16 March 1958. They had one child. Globerfelt-Taro died in Gentofte, Denmark on 30 March 1977.
