= 1973 in Denmark =

- Decades: 1950s; 1960s; 1970s; 1980s; 1990s
- See also: Other events of 1973; List of years in Denmark

Events from the year 1973 in Denmark.

== Incumbents ==
- Monarch – Margrethe II
- Prime minister – Anker Jørgensen (until 19 December), Poul Hartling

== Events ==
- 1 January – Denmark joined the European Economic Community (EEC) along with Ireland and the United Kingdom.
- 4 December – 1973 Danish parliamentary election is held, it is later to become known as the Landslide Election (Danish: Jordskredsvalget), because 5 new parties got elected, and more than half the members of the parliament were replaced.

== Sports ==
=== Badminton ===
- 12–17 March – 1973 Denmark Open
  - Elo Hansen and Ulla Strand win gold in mixed doubles

=== Handball ===
- 1 May – GOG Håndbold is founded

== Births ==
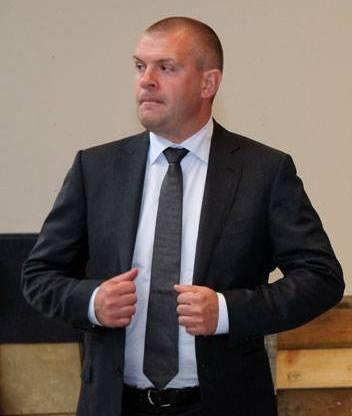
Bjarne Corydon.

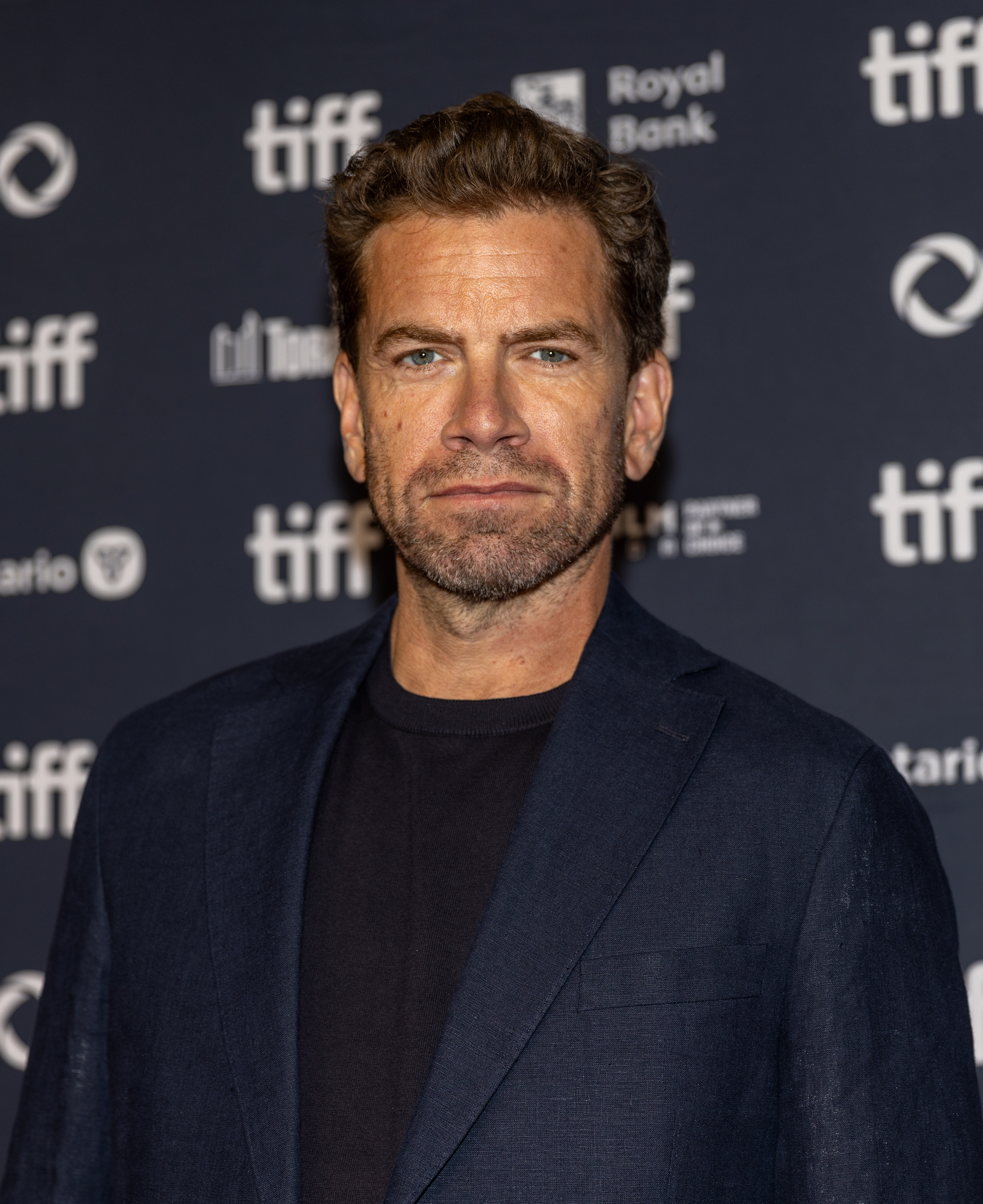
Nikolaj Lie Kaas.

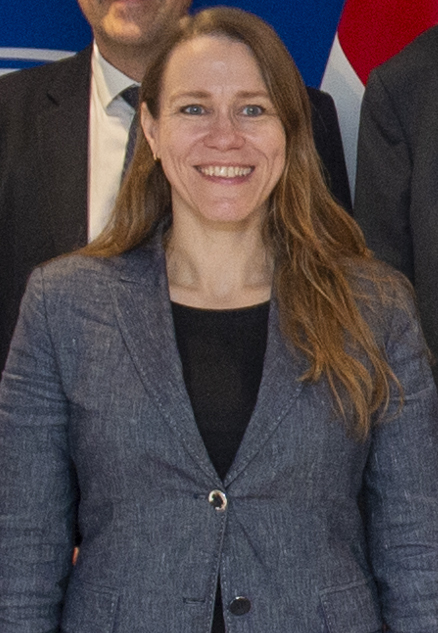
Barbara Bertelsen.

=== January–March ===
- 4 January – Frank Høj, cyclist
- 10 January – Jakob Cedergren, actor
- 11 March – Bjarne Corydon, politician, editor-in-chief
- 16 March – Inger Støjberg, politician
- 24 March – Mette Jacobsen, freestyle and butterfly swimmer
- 29 March – Kasper Holten, stage director

=== April–June ===
- 22 May – Nikolaj Lie Kaas, actor

=== July–September ===
- 29 April – Yildiz Akdogan, politician
- 5 July – Camilla Andersen, handball player
- 23 July – Thomas Ebert, rower
- 24 September – Barbara Bertelsen, civil servant
- 25 September – Jakob Ellemann-Jensen, politician

=== October–December ===
- 9 October – Thomas Frank, football manager

== Deaths ==
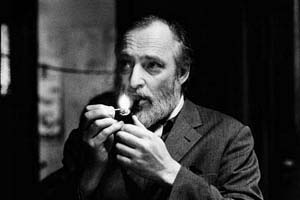
Asger Jorn.

=== January–March ===
- 18 March – Lauritz Melchior, singer (died 1890)

=== April–June ===
- 9 April – Sigurd Swane, painter (born 1879)
- 1 May – Asger Jorn, painter (born 1914)

=== July–September ===
- 9 August – Christian Arhoff, actor (born 1893)

=== October–December ===
- 23 November – Helga Foght, textile artist (born 1902)
- 30 December – Aage Bendixen, actor (born 1887)

== See also ==
- 1973 in Danish television
