= Paul Lassenius Kramp =

Danish marine biologist (1887–1975)

- Born: 28 January 1887; Copenhagen
- Died: 13 July 1975 (aged 88); Gentofte
- Known for: Synopsis of the Medusae of the World
- Spouse: Marie Bolette Blædel
- Scientific career
- Workplaces: University of Copenhagen Zoological Museum

Paul Lassenius Kramp (28 January 1887 – 13 July 1975) was a Danish marine biologist. He is best known for his extensive monographs on jellyfish. Several marine taxa have been named in his honor.

== Eponymous taxa ==
- Aequorea krampi Bouillon, 1984
- Amphinema krampi Russell, 1956
- Calycopsis krampi Petersen, 1957
- Convexella krampi (Madsen, 1956)
- Escharina krampi Marcus, 1938
- Eutima krampi Guo, Xu & Huang, 2008
- Krampella Russell, 1957
- Krampia Ditlevsen, 1921
- Mohnia (Tacita) krampi (Thorson, 1951)
- Ransonia krampi (Ranson, 1932)
- Tomopteris krampi Wesenberg-Lund, 1936
