= 1771 in Denmark =

- Decades: 1750s; 1760s; 1770s; 1780s; 1790s
- See also: Other events of 1771; List of years in Denmark

Events from the year 1771 in Denmark.

== Incumbents ==
- Monarch – Christian VII
- Prime minister – Johann Friedrich Struensee

== Events ==
- January - Mathildeordenen is created.
- 15 June – Hof- og Stadsretten is established by royal charter in an attempt to rationalize the chaotic Danish court system.

=== Undated ===
- The Royal Theatre Ballet School in Copenhagen is founded.
- The company later known as H. H. Thiele is founded by Johan Rudolph Thiele.

== Births ==
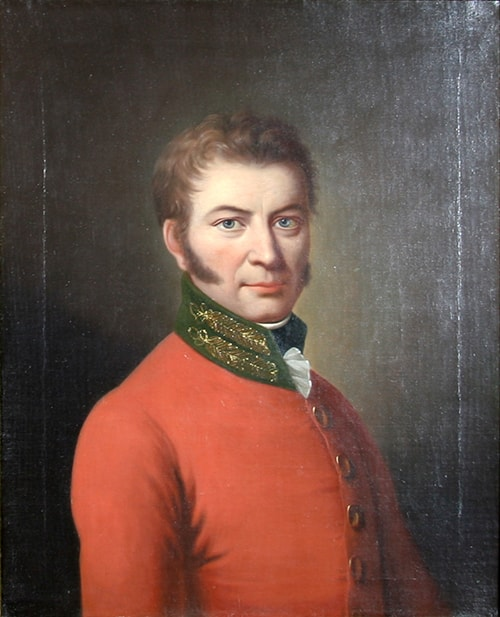
Otto Himmelstrup Hvidberg.

- 20 February – Jørgen Conradt, coppersmith (died 1851)
- 10 February – Lars Bache, ferryman and privateer (died 1809)
- 26 February – Cornelius Høyer, painter (died 1804)
- 24 May – Prince Frederik of Hesse, nobleman, general and governor (died 1845)
- 7 July – Princess Louise Auguste, princess of Denmark, Duchess of Augustenborg (died 1843)
- 25 September – Otto Himmelstrup Hvidberg, chief of police (died 1822)

== Deaths ==
- 28 February – Johann Michael Lavien, planter (born c. 1717)
- 16 April – Christian Rantzau, Governor-general of Norway (born 1684)
- 11 May – Herman Henrik Kønneman, businessman and politician (born 1692)
- 28 May – Gerhard Morell. art dealer and keeper of Kunstkammeret (born c. 1710)
- 20 September – Johannes Valeur, judge and vice mayor of Copenhagen (born 17001))
