= 1884 in Denmark =

- Decades: 1860s; 1870s; 1880s; 1890s; 1900s
- See also: Other events of 1884; List of years in Denmark

Events from the year 1884 in Denmark.

== Incumbents ==
- Monarch – Christian IX
- Prime minister – J. B. S. Estrup

== Events ==
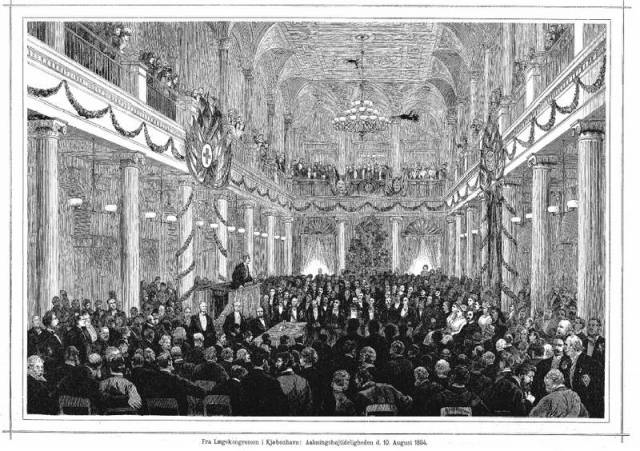
Peter Ludwig Panum speaking at the opening ceremony at the 8th International Medical Congress in Copenhagen

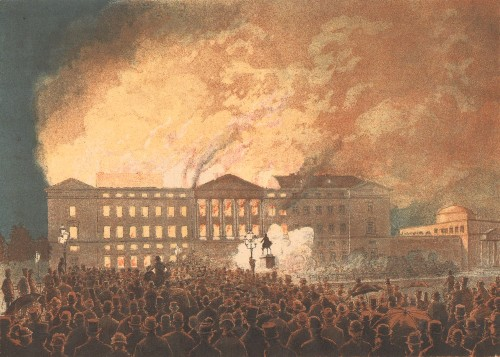
3 October: Fire of Christiansborg Palace

May

- 31 May – The Tommerup–Assens railway line opens on Funen.

June* 25 June – The 1884Danish Folketing election takes place.

- 10–16 August – The 8th International Medical Congress opens in Copenhagen. The participants include Peter Ludvig Panum (President), Louis Pasteur, Rudolf Ludwig Virchow and James Paget.

October

- 1 October – The newspaper Dagbladet Politiken is founded by Viggo Hørup, Edvard Brandes and Hermann Bing.
- 3 October – The fire of the 2nd Christiansborg Palace begins.

== Culture ==
=== Art ===
- The Thorvaldsen Exhibition Medal is awarded to Christian Zacho for the painting Quiet waters in Dyrehaven and to August Jerndorff for a portrait painting (possibly Anne Gerricke).

== Births ==
=== January–March ===
- 4 January – Harald Christensen, wrestler (died 1959)
- 18 March – Oluf Høst, painter (died 1966)

=== April–June ===
- 9 April – Peter Andersen, gymnast (died 1954)
- 14 May – Erik Magnussen, silversmith (died 1861 in the United States)
- 28 May – Harald Krenchel, fencer (died 1922)
- 30 June – Svend Rindomm screenwriter and actor (died 1960)

=== July–September ===
- 13 July – Mary Willumsen, photographer (died 1961)
- 30 September – Carl Pedersen, rower (died 1968)

=== October–December ===
- 1 December – Torben Meyer, actor (died 1975 in the United States)
- 6 November – Elisabeth Neckelmann, painter (died 1956)
- 16 December – Jonathan Leunbach, doctor (died 1955)

== Deaths ==
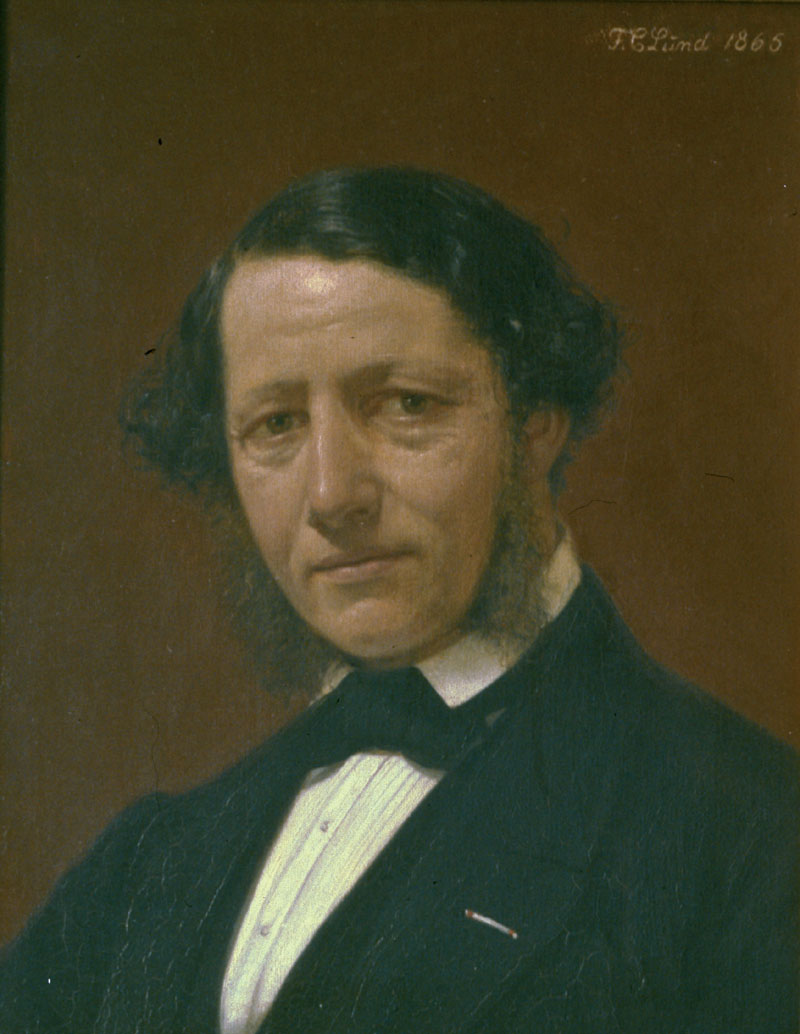
Moritz G. Melchior.

=== January –March ===
- 24 January – Johan Christian Gebauer, composer (born 1806)
- 3 February – Hans Lassen Martensen, bishop and academic (born 1808)
- 16 February – Niels Hoffmeyer, army officer (born 1836)

=== April–June ===
- 18 June – Sophus Berendsen, businessman (died 1829)
- 28 June – Anna Christiane Ludvigsen, poet (born 1794)

=== July–September ===
- 9 August – Annestine Beyer, reform pedagogue and pioneer on women's education (born 1795)
- 19 September – Moritz G. Melchior, businessman (died 1816)
- 23 September – Mads Pagh Bruun, politician (born 1809)
- 30 September –Rasmus Nielsen, philosopher (born 1809)

=== October–December ===
- 28 October – Max Müller, army officer (born 1808)
- 19 December – Alfred Benzon, pharmacist and industrialist (born 1823)
- 30 December – Budtz Müller, photographer (born 1837)
