= 1809 in Denmark =

- Decades: 1780s; 1790s; 1800s; 1810s; 1820s
- See also: Other events of 1809; List of years in Denmark

Events from the year 1809 in Denmark.

== Incumbents ==
- Monarch – Frederick VI
- Prime minister – Christian Günther von Bernstorff

== Events ==
=== Undated ===
- Christoph Ernst Friedrich Weyse, since 1805 organist at Church of Our Lady, has his debut at the Royal Danish Theatre with the singspiel Sovedrikken, and from then on his romances become an important part of the Danish music scene.
- Sporgø Lighthouse is constructed by Poul de Løvenørn.

== Births ==
=== January–March ===
- 6 February – Theodore Cantor, zoologist (died 1860)
- 7 February – Frederik Paludan-Müller, poet (died 1876)
- 18 March – Frederik Ferdinand Helsted, painter and drawing master (died 1875)

=== April–June ===
- 28 April – Oscar O'Neill Oxholm, military officer and landowner (died 1871)
- 13 May – Emil Horneman, composer and art and music tradesman (died 1870)

=== July–September ===
- 4 July –Rasmus Nielsen, philosopher (died 1884)
- 5 September – Mads Pagh Bruun, politician (died 1884)

=== October–December ===
- 9 December – Edouard Buntzen, lawuer and politician (died 1885)

== Deaths ==
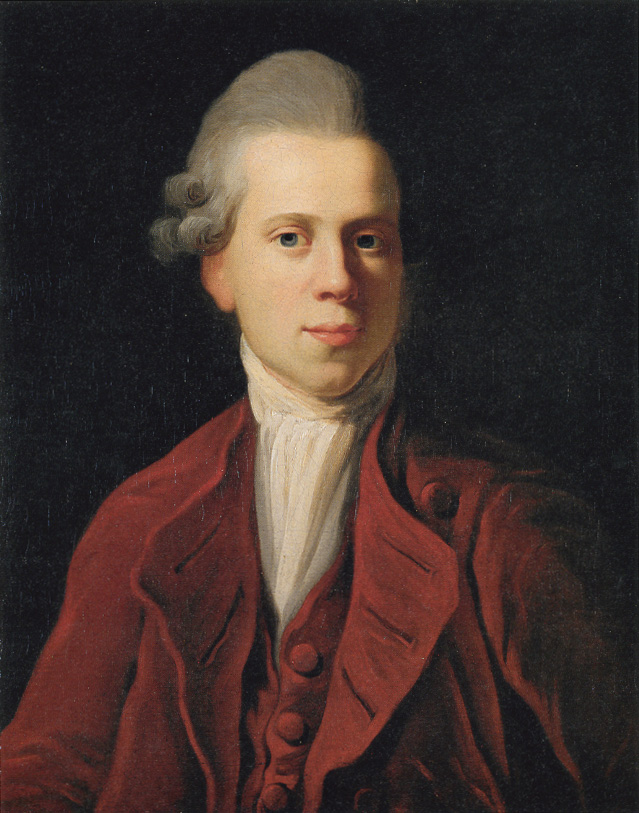
Nicolai A. Abildgaard.

- 2 April – Joachim-Daniel Preisler, actor (born 1755)
- 17 March – Otto Christopher von Munthe af Morgenstierne, civil servant, judge and landowner (born 1735)
- 18 May – Charlotte Elisabeth Henriette Holstein, courtier (born 1741)
- 4 June – Nikolaj Abraham Abildgaard, painter (born 1743)
- 26 July – Lars Bache, ferryman and privateer (born 1771)

=== Full date missing ===
- Birgitte Winther, opera singer (born 1751)
