= 1806 in Denmark =

- Decades: 1780s; 1790s; 1800s; 1810s; 1820s
- See also: Other events of 1806; List of years in Denmark

Events from the year 1806 in Denmark.

== Incumbents ==
- Monarch – Christian VII
- Prime minister – Christian Günther von Bernstorff

== Events ==
June

- 21 June – The wedding of Prince Christian (VIII) and Duchess Charlotte Frederica of Mecklenburg-Schwerin takes place at Ludwigslust.

October

- 27 October – The Barony of Gaunø was established by Otto Reedtz-Thott (1785-1862) from the manors of Gavnø, Lindersvold and Strandegård.

=== Undated ===
- Flights in Copenhagen with manned hot air balloon.

== Births ==
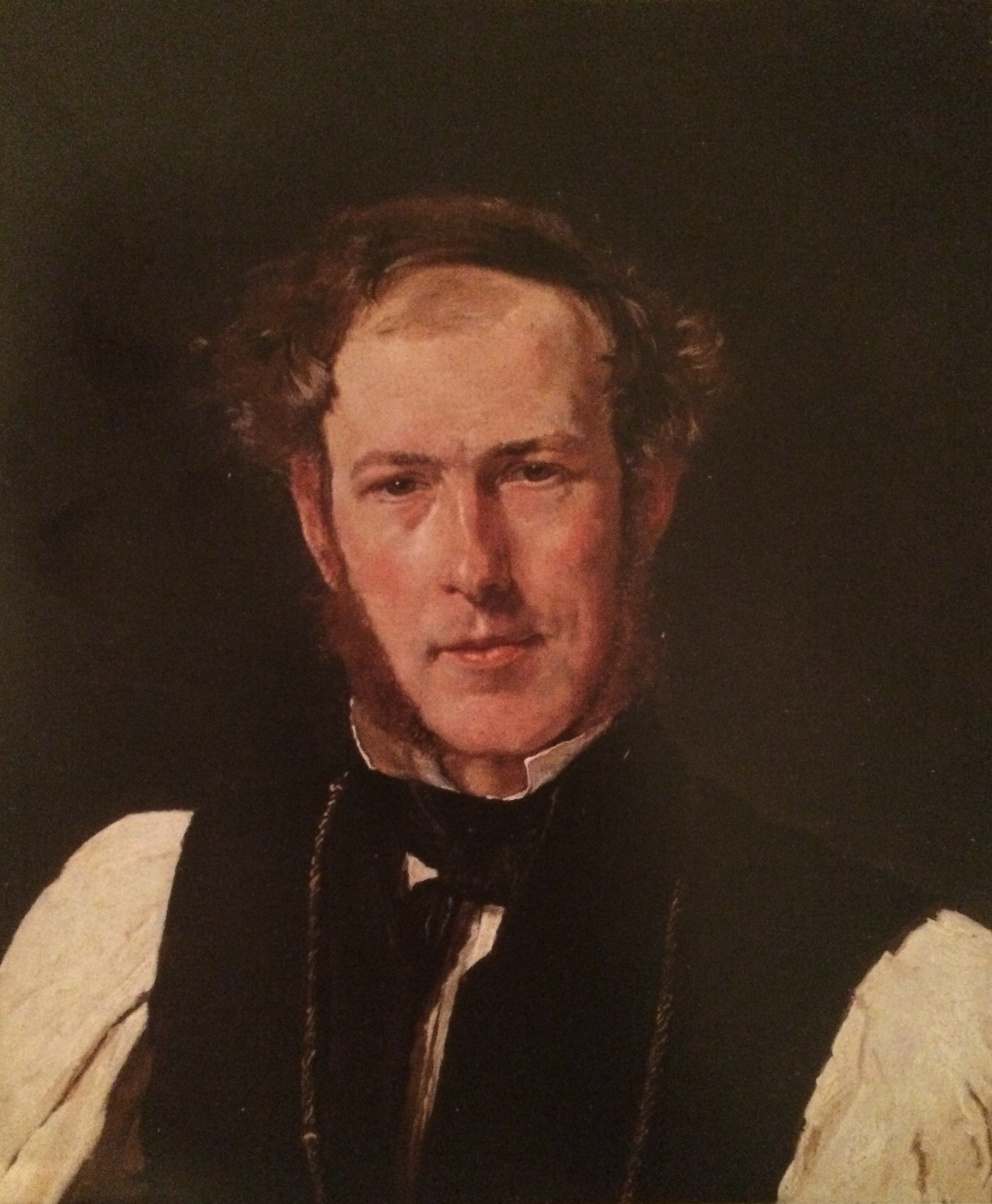
Frederik Christopher Krohn.

=== January–March ===
- 24 February – Christopher Bagnæs Hansen, furniture maker (died 1868)

=== April–June ===
- 26 March – Joachim Bruun de Neergaard (died 1893)

=== July–September ===
- 4 August – Frederik Christopher Krohn, medallist and sculptor (died 1883)
  - 21 Aigist – Johannes Frederik Fröhlich, composer and musician (died 1860)
- 6 August – Johan Christian Gebauer, composer (died 1885)
- 24 September – Niels Christian Kierkegaard, craftsman and lithographer (died 1882)

=== October–December ===
- 11 October – Niels Kjærbølling, ornithological writer and lithographer, founder of Copenhagen Zoo (died 1871)
- 14 October – Niels Sigfred Nebelong, historicist-style architect, resident architect for the Danish lighthouse authority (died 1871)
- 18 October– Peter Raadsig, painter (born 1882)

== Deaths ==
- 16 May – Frederick von Blücher, courtier (born 1760 in Mecklenburg-Strelitz)

Undated

- Ernst Burmeister, architect and painter (born c. 1774 in Germany)
