= 1803 in Denmark =

- Decades: 1780s; 1790s; 1800s; 1810s; 1820s
- See also: Other events of 1803; List of years in Denmark

Events from the year 1803 in Denmark.

== Incumbents ==
- Monarch – Christian VII
- Prime minister – Christian Günther von Bernstorff

== Events ==
=== Undated ===
- Import of slaves to the Danish West Indies is abolished.
- The Port of Odense is established.
- Bertel Thorvaldsen completes his statue of Jason with the Golden Fleece, his first major success.

== Births ==
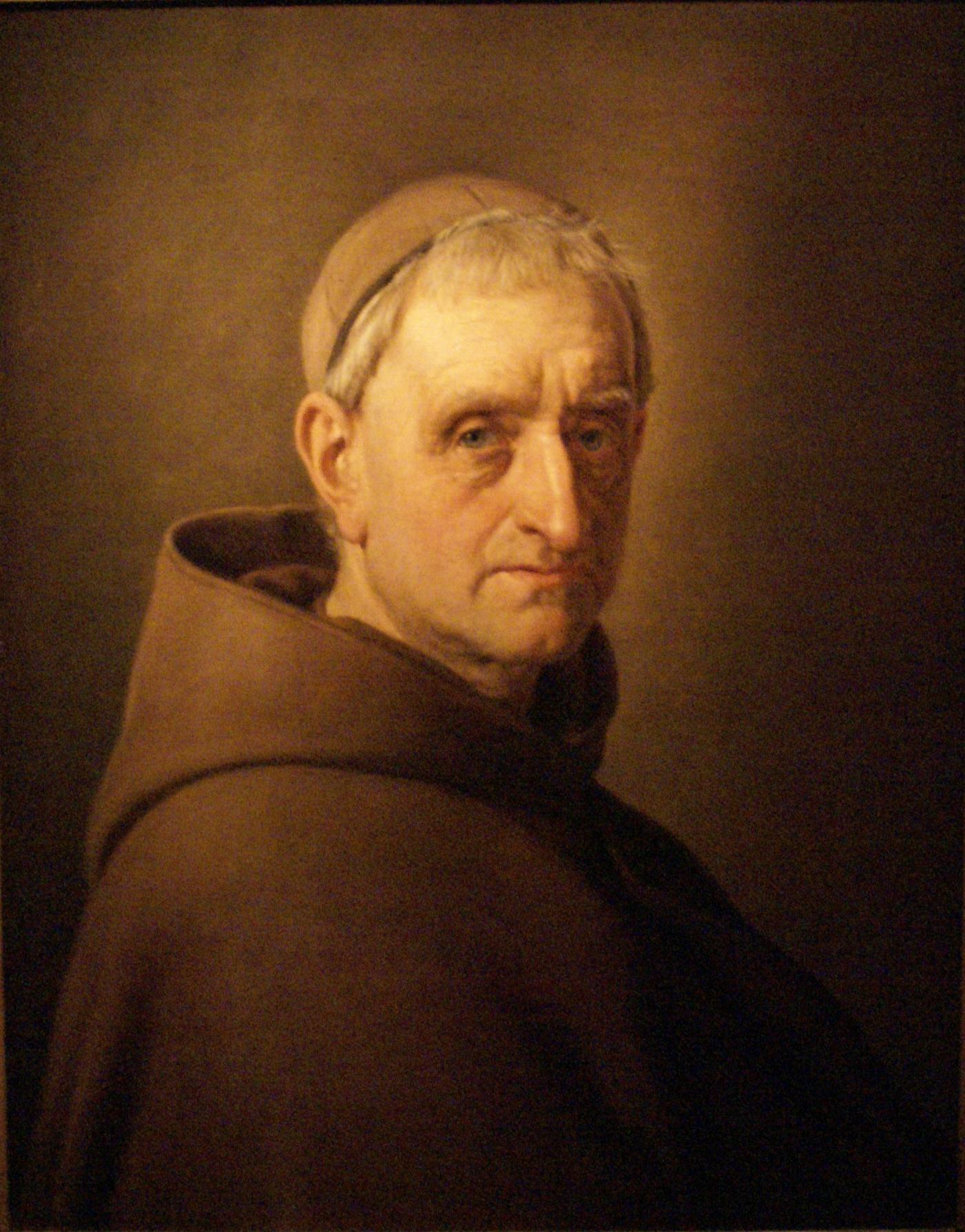
Albert Küchler.

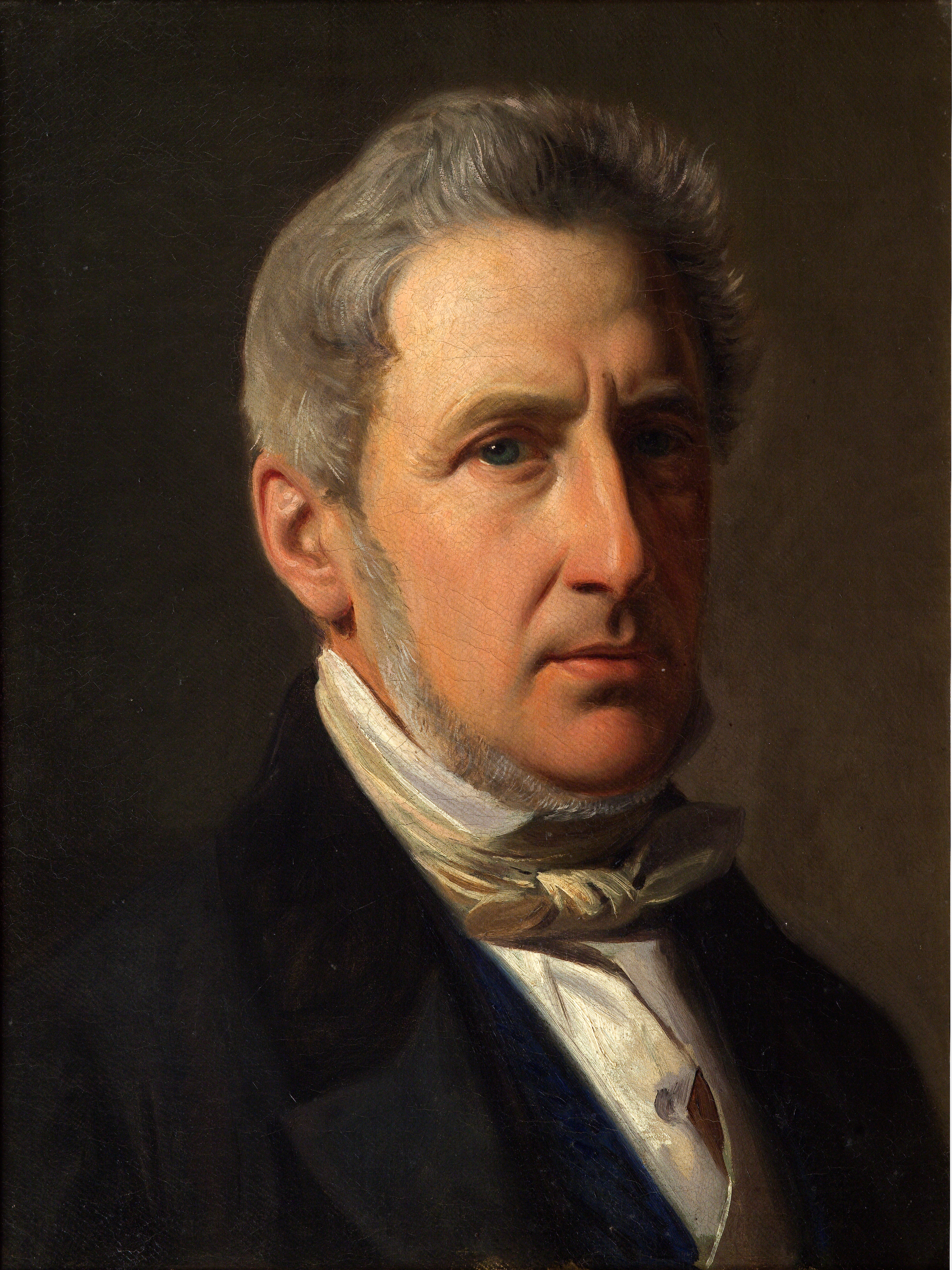
Alfred Hage.

=== January–March ===
- 4 January – Robert Cleaver Chapman, pastor, teacher and evangelist, the apostle of Love (died 1902)
- 12 January – Christian Pløyen, jurist and government official (died 1867)
- 8 March – Ferdinand Thielemann, architect (died 1863)
- 19 March – Christine Løvmand, artist specializing in painting flowers and still lifes (d. 1872)

=== April–June ===
- 20 April – Christian Hansen, architect (d. 1883)
- 23 April – Heinrich Gustav Ferdinand Holm, artist and engraver (d. 1861)
- 2 May – Albert Küchler, painter active in Italy (d. 1886)
- 17 May – Martinus Rørbye, painter (d. 1848)

=== July–September ===
- 3 July – Gustav Skram, railroad director (died 1865)
- 4 September – Anna Nielsen, mezzo-soprano (died 1856)

=== October–December ===
- 5 October - Friedrich Bernhard Westphal, painter (d. 1844)
- 4 December – Knut Jungbohn Clement, linguist (died 1873)
- 31 December
  - Alfred Hage, merchant and landowner (died 1872)
  - Emilie da Fonseca, actress and opera singer (died 1884)

== Deaths ==
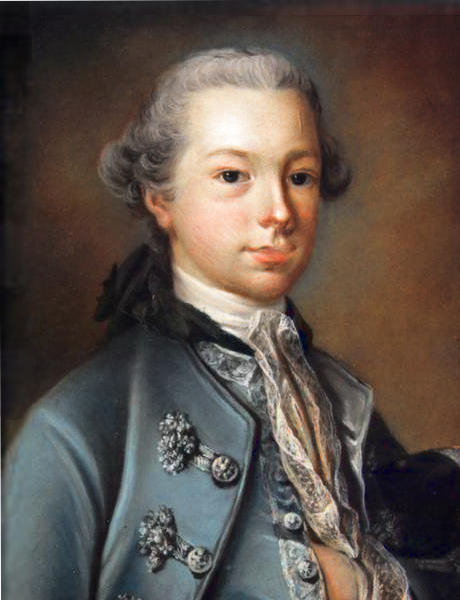
Antoine de Bosc de la Calmette.

- 18 January – Frederik Christian Kaas, naval officer (born 1725)
- 6 February – Peder Rosenstand-Goiske, lawyer and playwright (born 1752)
- 4 June – Peter Ascanius, natural scientist (born 1723)
- 7 April – Antoine de Bosc de la Calmette, county governor (born 1752)
- 11 June – Henrik Brockenhuus, landowner (born 1720)
