= Rosenstand =

Rosenstand is a Danish surname. Notable people with the surname include:

- Peder Rosenstand-Goiske (1752–1803), Danish playwright and lawyer
- Vilhelm Rosenstand (1838–1915), Danish painter and illustrator
