= 1846 in Denmark =

- Decades: 1820s; 1830s; 1840s; 1850s; 1860s
- See also: Other events of 1846; List of years in Denmark

Events from the year 1846 in Denmark.

== Incumbents ==
- Monarch – Christian VIII
- Prime minister – Poul Christian Stemann

== Events ==
- 5 May – The Society of the Friends of Peasants is established in Copenhagen.

=== Undated ===
- The of Den højere Dannelsesanstalt for Damer, the first secondary education school for women, is established by Annestine Beyer and Emil Bojsen.

== Births ==
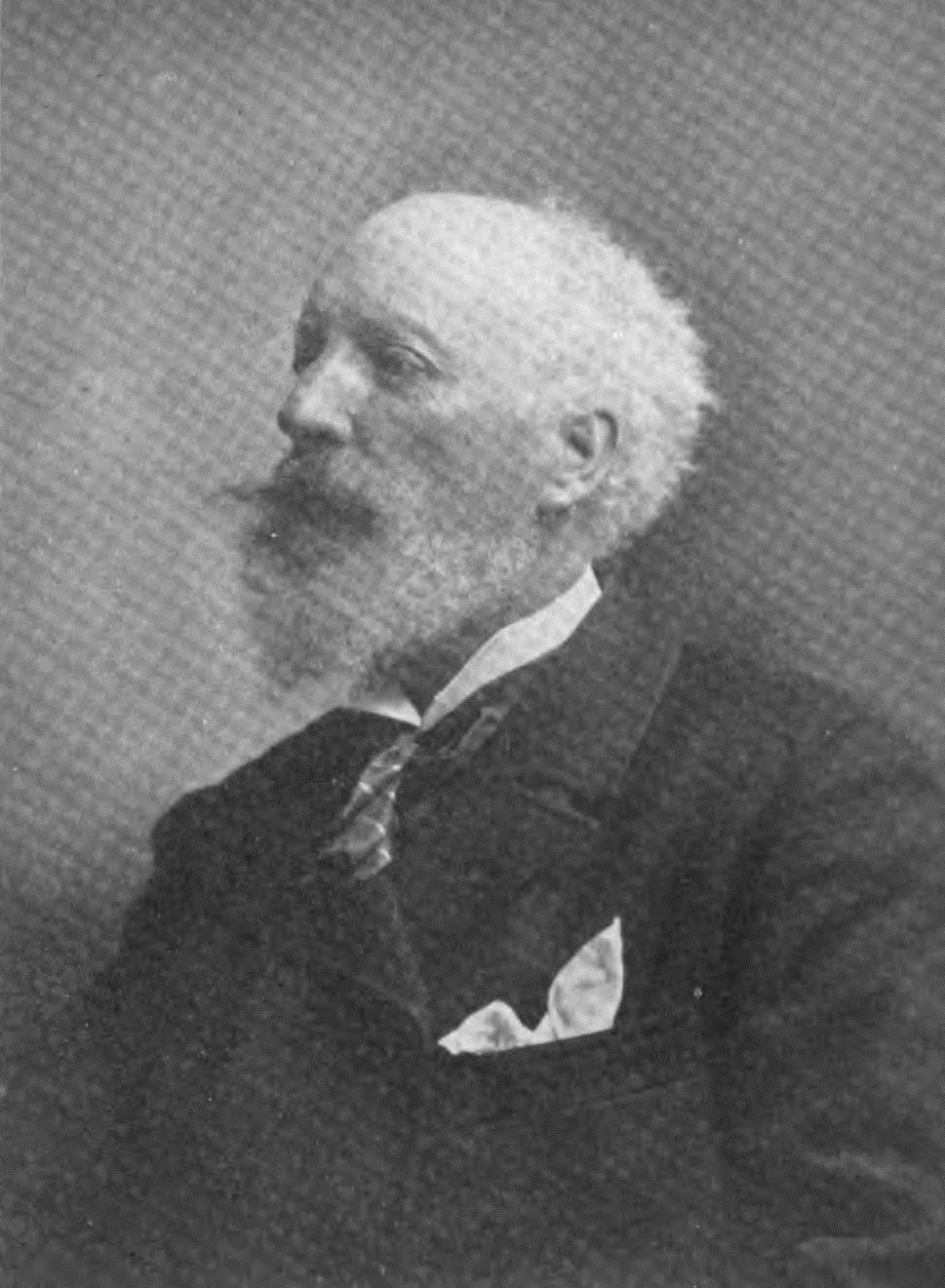
Holger Drachmann.

=== January–March ===
- 11 January – Gustav Budde-Lund, zoologist (died 1911)
- 25 January – August Jerndorff, painter (died 1906)
- 8 March – Gerhard Faye, factory manager (died 1917)
- 19 March – Oscar Wanscher, surgeon (died 1906)
- 22 March – Holger F. Struer, chemist and company founder (died 1931)

=== October–December ===
- 9 October – Holger Drachmann, poet, dramatist and painter (died 1908)
- 2 November – Holger Roed, painter (died 1874)

== Deaths ==
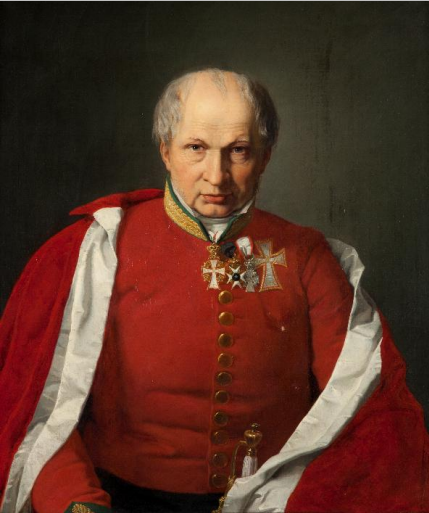
Andreas Christian Kierulff.

- 27 January – Anne Cathrine Collett, landowner (born 1768)
- 24 July – Christian Holm, painter (born 1804)
- 22 August – Andreas Christian Kierulff, chief of police (born 1782)
