= 1807 in Denmark =

- Decades: 1780s; 1790s; 1800s; 1810s; 1820s
- See also: Other events of 1807; List of years in Denmark

Events from the year 1807 in Denmark.

== Incumbents ==
- Monarch – Christian VII
- Prime minister – Christian Günther von Bernstorff

== Events ==
=== January ===
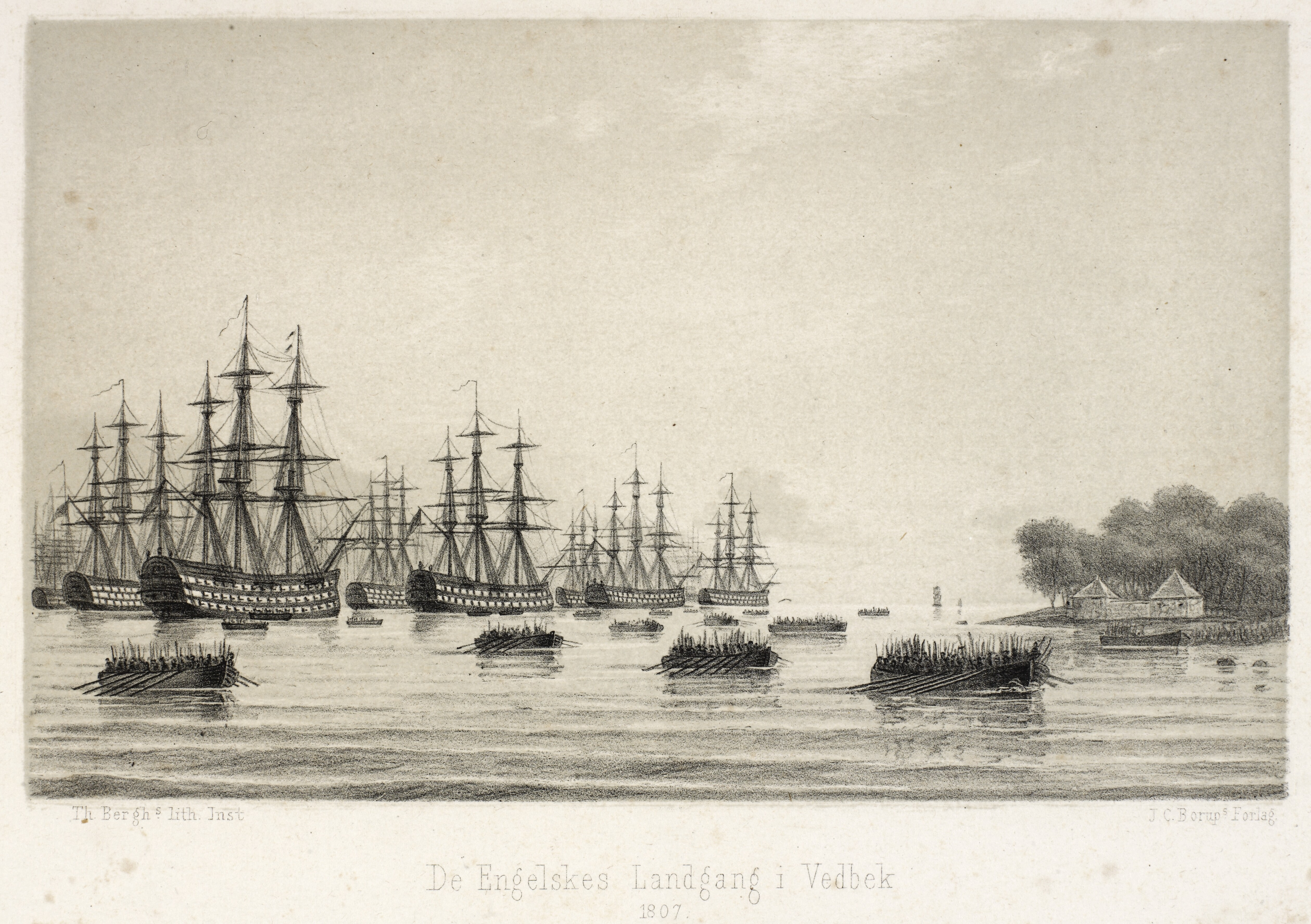
16 August: British troops landing at Vedbæk.

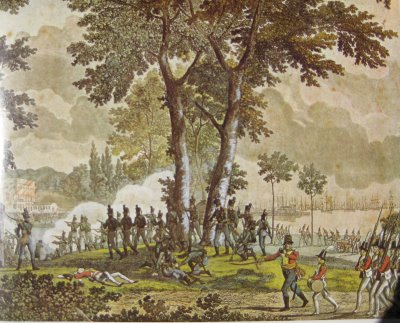
31 August: The assault at Classens Have.

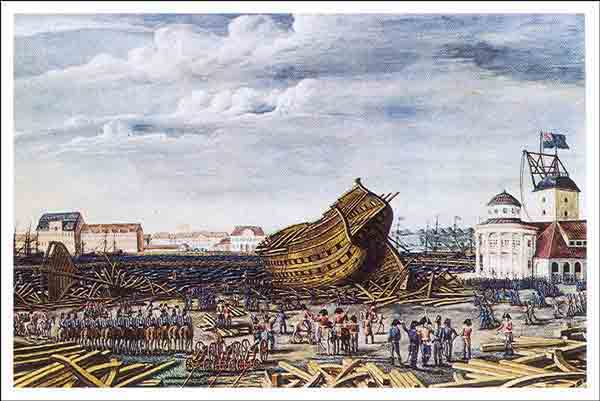
British destruction of ship at Holmen, copy after painting by C. W. Eckersberg.

- 7 January – England declares an embargo against France and its allies, including Denmark–Norway.
- 29 January – The Danish fortress Frederiksnagore surrenders to the British forces and will remain occupied until 1815. Trankebar and the Danish West Indies are also occupied by the British during the conflict.

=== April ===
- 17 April – The Royal Institute for the Deaf is founded in Copenhagen.

=== May ===
- 6 May – Mozart's Don Juan is performed in Copenhagen for the first time, with Édouard Du Puy in the title role.

=== August ===
- 16 August – British troops land at Vedbæk.
- 29 August – The Battle of Køge, also known as the 'Clogs Battle', between British troops besieging Copenhagen and Danish militia raised on Zealand ends in British victory.
- 29–31 August – Battle at Classens Have which is destroyed.

=== September ===
- 2 September – Bombardment of Copenhagen starts: 290 properties burn and another 1,500 to 1,600 are damaged; 2,000 people are killed or wounded; and the Church of Our Lady and the University are among the buildings which burn.
- 7 September – Peymann, the commander of Copenhagen, surrenders to the British after four days of bombardment of the city.

=== October ===
- 21 October – The British sail away with the Danish naval fleet (17 ships of the line, 12 frigates, 8 brigs, 35 smaller vessels and 81 transport ships) after destroying the ships under construction at the Holmen Naval Base.
- 31 October – Denmark–Norway is forced into an alliance with Napoleon.

=== November ===
- 4 November – England declares war on Denmark–Norway.

=== Undated ===
- From this year annual art exhibitions are held at Charlottenborg.
- The first step towards the establishment of the museum for Nordic antiquities are made when a small collection is exhibited in the loft above Trinitatis Church in Copenhagen.

== Births ==
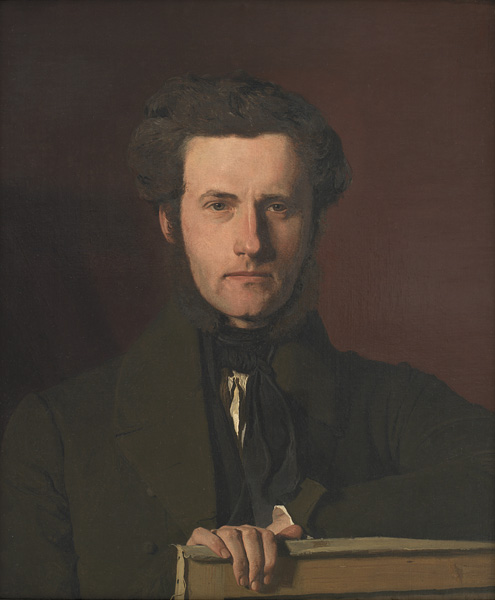
Georg Hilker.

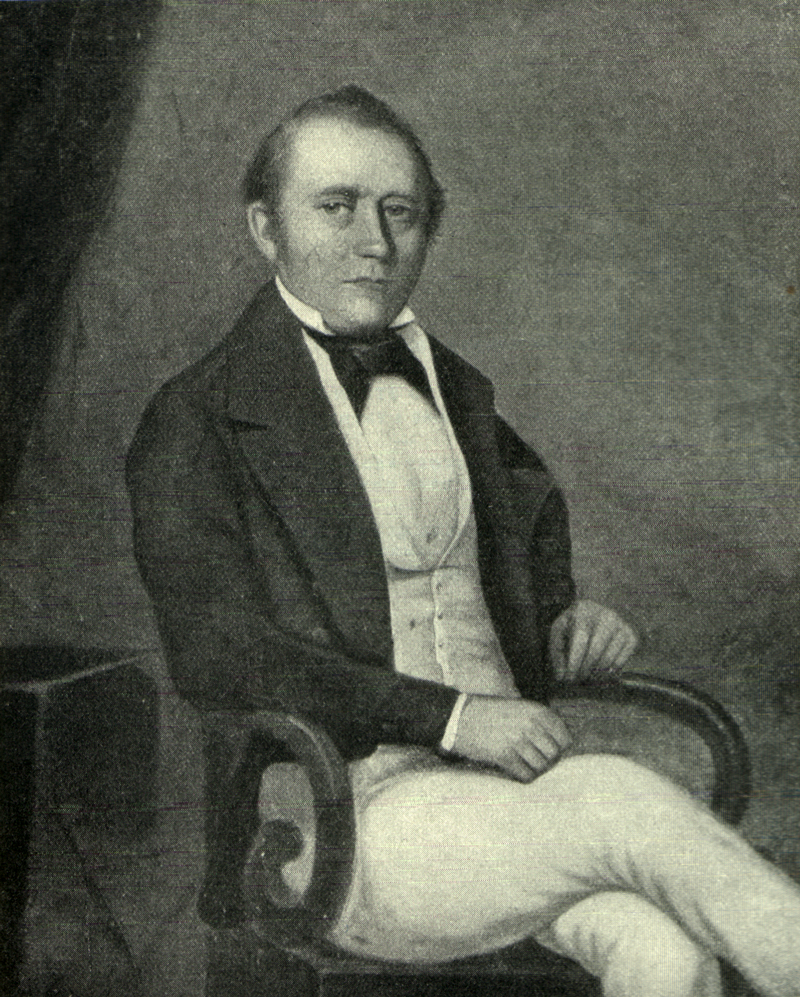
Mads Johansen Lange,

=== January–March ===
- 30 March – Henrik Rung, composer, conductor and vocal pedagogue (died 1871)

=== May–June ===
- 4 May – Emmerik Høegh-Guldberg, painter (died 1881)
- 5 June – Georg Hilker, decorative painter during the Danish Golden Age (died 1875)

=== July–September ===
- 22 August – Emma Hartmann, composer (died 1851)
- 18 September – Mads Johansen Lange, trader, "King of Bali" (died 1856)

=== October–December ===
- 23 Movember – Carl Joachim Hambro, banker, founder of Hambros Bank (died 1877)
- 10 December – Niels Simonsen, painter, lithographer and sculptor (born 1885)

== Deaths ==
- 22 February – Johan Boye Junge, master carpenter, developer and director of Copenhagen Fire Corps (born 1735)
- 19 April – Michael Herman Løvenskiold, district governor and landowner (born 1751)
- 17 August – Johannes Nikolaus Tetens, philosopher, statesman and scientist (born 1736)
- 20 December – Lorenz Spengler, director of the Royal Danish Cabinet of Art and Curiosities (born 1720 in Switzerland)
- 23 December – Peter Leonhard Gianelli, medallist (born 1767)
