= Flindt =

Findt is a surname. Notable people with the surname include:

- Eve Branson (née Evette Flindt; 1924–2021), British philanthropist
- Flemming Flindt (1936–2009), Danish choreographer
- Johan Thomas Flindt (1741-1805), Danish police chief
- Vivi Flindt (née Gelker; born 1943), Danish dancer
