= 1805 in Denmark =

- Decades: 1780s; 1790s; 1800s; 1810s; 1820s
- See also: Other events of 1805; List of years in Denmark

Events from the year 1805 in Denmark.

== Incumbents ==
- Monarch – Christian VII
- Prime minister – Christian Günther von Bernstorff

== Events ==
- 25 August – A. C. Gamél us founded when Augustin Cyrille Gamél opens a delicacy shop on Østergade in Copenhagen.

=== Undated ===
- Christiansø Lighthouse is first lit.

== Births ==
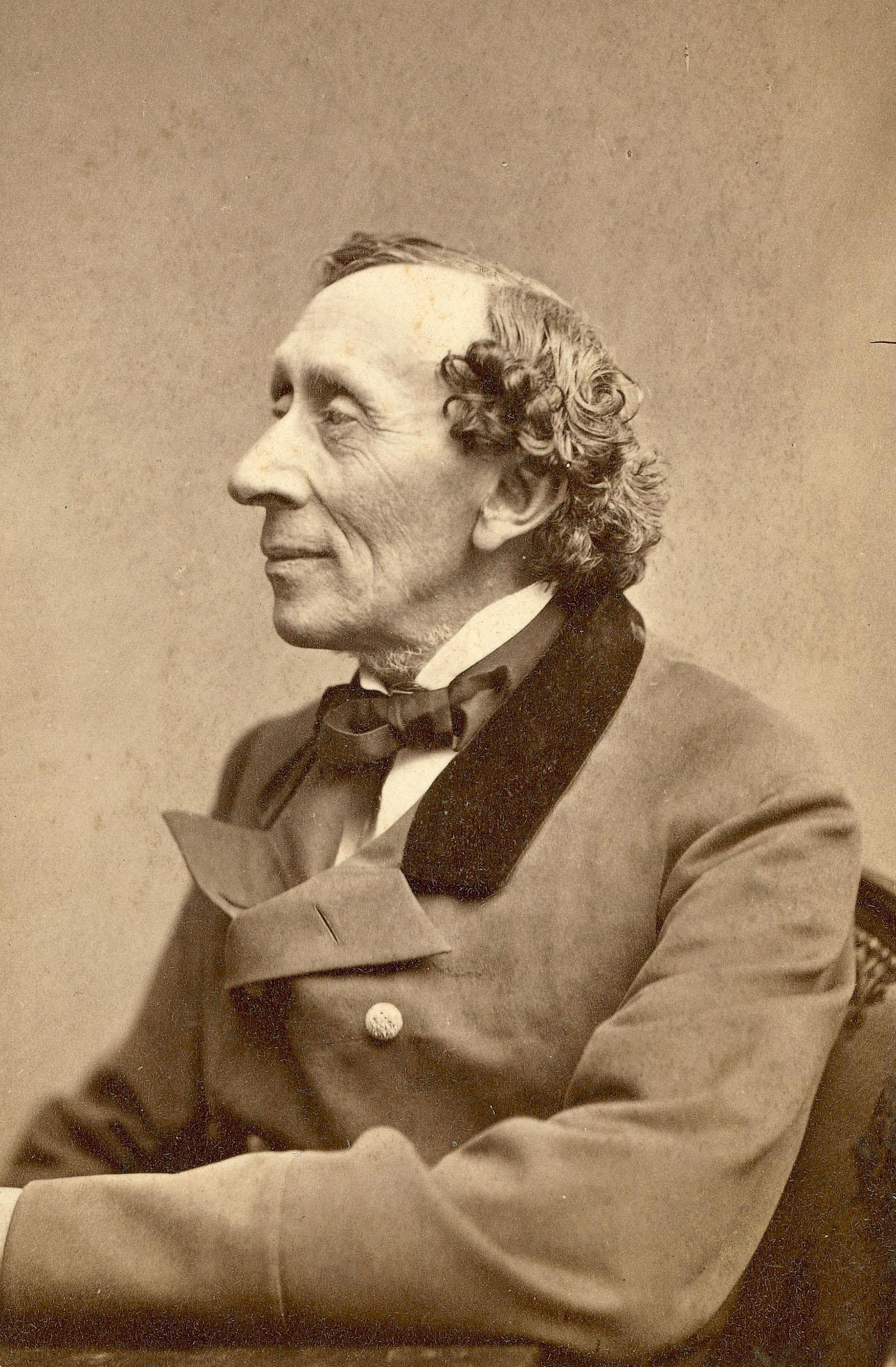
H. C. Andersen

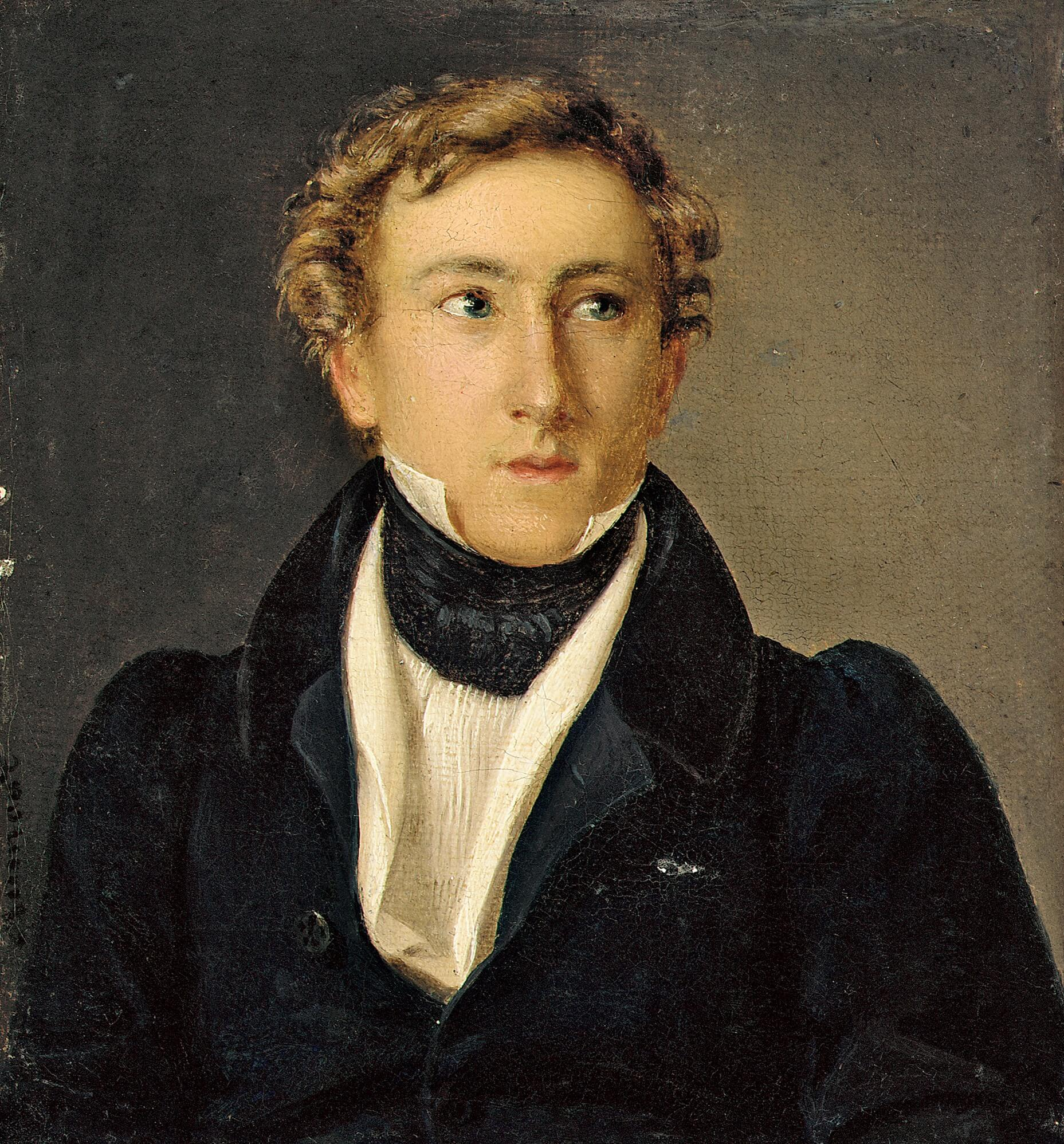
August Bournonville.

=== January–March ===
- 1 January – Fritz Petzholdt, painter (died 1838)
- 7 January – Louis Aumont, painter (died 1879)
- 7 February – Frederik Paludan-Müller, poet (died 1876)

=== March–May ===
- 2 April – Hans Christian Andersen, writer of plays, travelogues, novels, poems and fairy tales (died 1875)
- 13 April – Edouard Suenson, naval officer (died 1887)
- 14 May – Johan Peter Emilius Hartmann, composer (died 1900)

=== July–September ===
- 2 July – Hans Ditmar Frederik Feddersen, civil servant and politician (died 1863)
- 6 July – Peter Kierkegaard, clergyman and politician (died 1858)
- 21 July – Frederik Storch, painter (died 1883)
- 21 August – August Bournonville, ballet master and choreographer (died 1879)

=== October–December ===
- 11 November – Waldemar Tully Oxholm, diplomat and court official (died 1876)
- 15 November – Severine Casse, women's rights activist (died 1909)

== Deaths ==
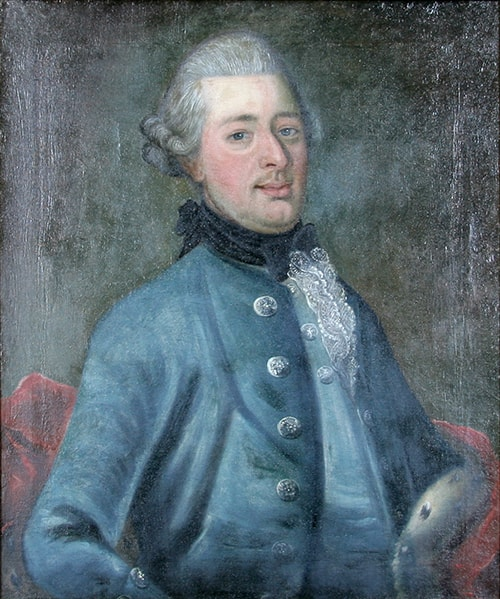
Johan Thomas Flindt.

- 4 March – Hinrich Ladiges, businessman (born 1731)
- 10 November – Johan Thomas Flindt, chief of police in Copenhagen (born 1741)
- 7 December – Frederick, Hereditary Prince of Denmark (born 1753)
- 39 December – Hans Severin Holten, zoological writer and Geheimrat, (born 1770)
