= Johan Rudolph Thiele =

Danish book printer

Johan Rudolph Thiele (30 January 1736 - 30 January 1815) was a Danish book printer. He founded a successful printing business in Copenhagen in 1771 which was later continued as H. H. Thiele by his son Hans Henrik Thiele. The company survived until 1937. Another son, Frederik Anton Thiele, founded N. A. Thiele, a manufacturer and retailer of scientific instruments which would later develop into one of Denmark's leading chains of retail opticians under the name Thiele. A third son was the art historian and writer Just Mathias Thiele.

== Early life and education ==
Thiele was born in Lippe, Westphalia. He came to Copenhagen as a boy in 1748. He apprenticed as a book printer in Ernst Henrich Berling's printing business and continued to work there after completing his training.

== Career ==
In 1770, Thiele purchased a small printing business in Copenhagen and started his own company in 1771. His marriage to the widow of Thomas Larsen Borup, 1726–70) also made him the owner of Borup's former printing business in Store Helliggejststræde (now Valkendorfsgade). Thiele moved his business to the new building and later also purchased the neighbouring property. His customers included the publishing house Gyldendal and the Royal Danish Academy of Sciences and Letters.

Thiele passed the company on to his son Hans Henrik Thiele (1787–1839) in c. 1913. He renamed it H. H. Thiele after his father's death.

== Works ==
One of Thiele's most notable works was the printing of Gyldendal's 1794 edition of LLudvig Holberg's monumental Peder Paars.

== Personal life ==
Thiele married Rebecca Buch (1735-1774) on 16 October 1771. They had one son, Thomas Rudolph Thiele (1773-1841), before her early death after less than two and a half years of marriage in March 1774. Thiele married his second wife, Anna Louise Falchenberg (c. 1737-1785), on 15 November 1775. The marriage did not result in any children. His third wife was Anna Koed de Hemmer (1758-1812). They married on 28 October 1785 and had seven children, of which five survived to adulthood. Hans Henrik Thiele (c. 1787-1839) took over his father's printing business, renaming it H. H. Thiele after his death. * Frederik Anton Thiele (1795-1874) founded N. A. Thiele, a manufacturer of scientific instruments. Just Mathias Thiele achieved a successful career at the Royal Danish Academy of Fine Arts and is also remembered for his work as an arti historian and folklorist.
