= 1808 in Denmark =

- Decades: 1780s; 1790s; 1800s; 1810s; 1820s
- See also: Other events of 1808; List of years in Denmark

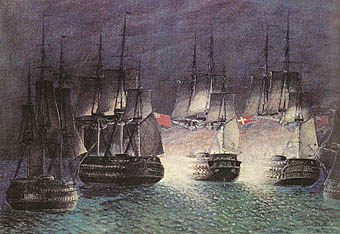
Battle of Zealand Point, where the ship-of-the-line Prins Christian Fredrik was sunk in 1808

Events from the year 1808 in Denmark.

== Incumbents ==
- Monarch – Christian VII (until 13 March), Frederick VI (starting 13 March)
- Prime minister – Christian Günther von Bernstorff

== Events ==
- 2 March – Action of 2, a naval battle between the British 18-gun Brig-sloop HMS Sappho, and the Danish 28-gun Danish brig of war Admiral Yawl
- 20 March – In the Battle of Zealand Point, Prins Christian, the last Danish ship-of-the-line, is defeated by a British squadron off Sjællands Odde. Peter Willemoes are among the Danish casualties.
- 9 June – The Battle of Saltholm

== Births ==
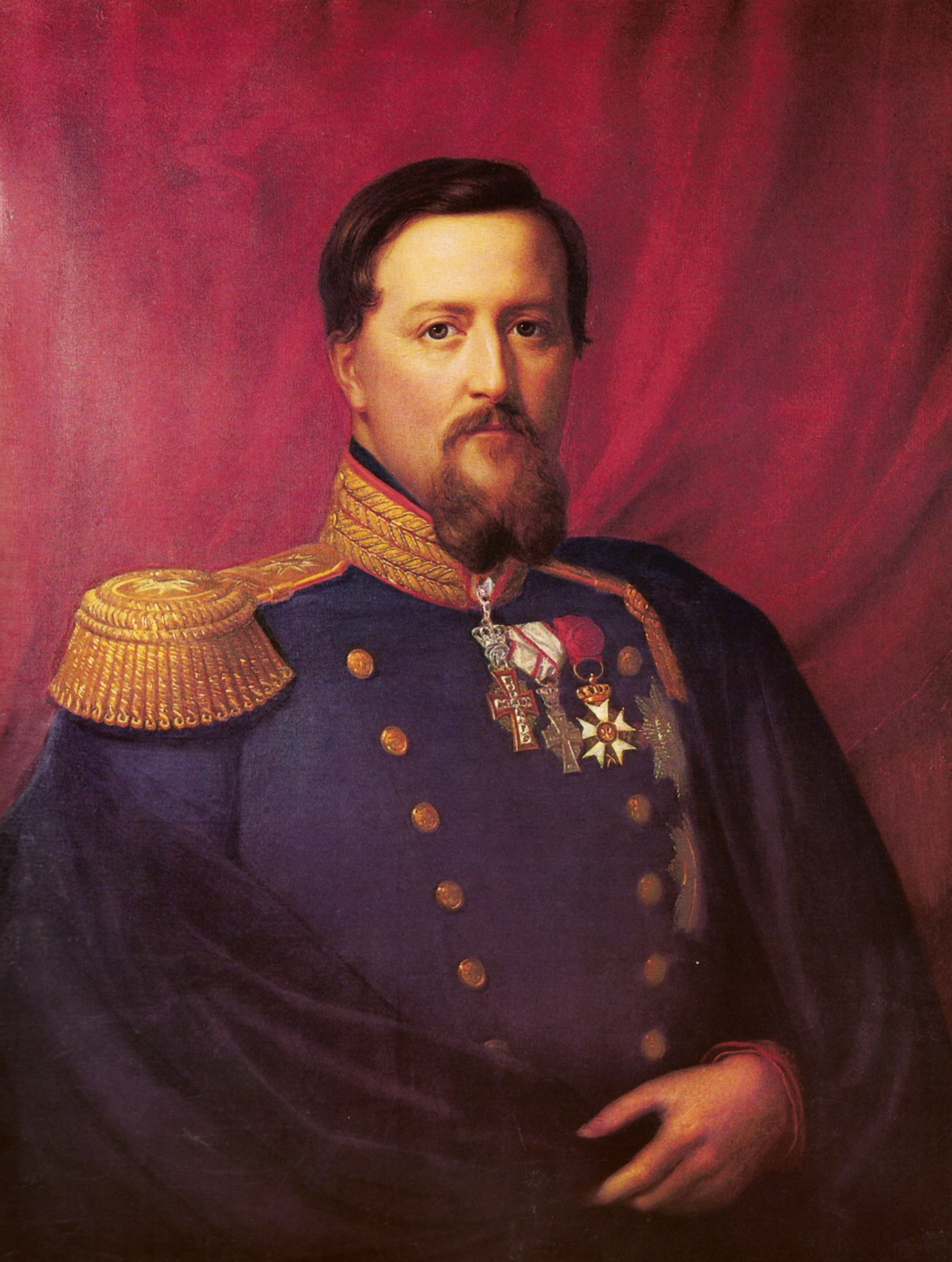
Frederick VII.

- 3 January – Jørgen Roed, painter (died 1888)
- 19 August – Hans Lassen Martensen, bishop and academic (died 1884)
- 25 September – Erling Eckersberg, engraver (died 1889)
- 6 October – Frederick VII, king of Denmark (died 1863)

== Deaths ==
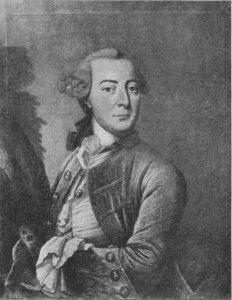
John Brown.

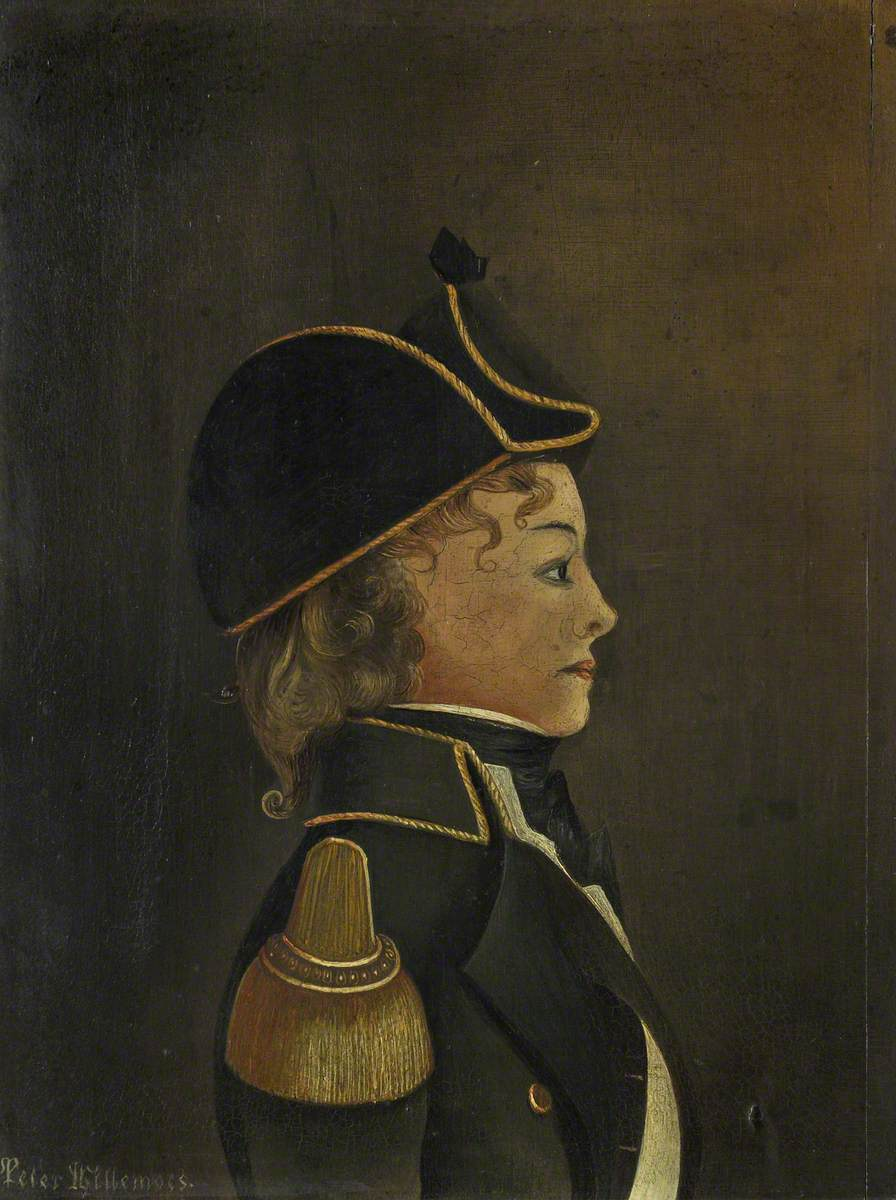
Peter Willemoes.

=== January–March ===
- 16 January – John Brown, merchant and ship-owner (born 1723)
- 7 February – Ove Høegh-Guldberg, statesman, historian, and de facto prime minister of Denmark (born 1731)
- 3 March – Johan Christian Fabricius, zoologist (born 1745)
- 24 March – Johan Friedrich Heinrich, colonial administrator (born 1730)
- 13 March – Christian VII, king of Denmark (born 1749)
- 22 March – Peter Willemoes, naval officer (born 1783)
- 29 March – Ulrik Christian Kaas, naval officer (born 1729)

=== April—June ===
- 3 April – Daniel Adzer, medallist (born 1732)
- 17 May – Carl Gottlob Rafn, physician (born 1769)
- 6 June – Magdalene Bärens, flower painter (born 1737)

=== October–December ===
- 22October – Max Müller, army officer (died 1884)
