= H. H. Thiele =

Former printing company in Denmark

H.H. Thiele, also known as Det Thieleske Bogtrykkeri, was a Danish printing company based in Copenhagen, Denmark. It was known for its printing of high quality illustrations, and printed banknotes for the Bank of Denmark as well as postal stamps for the Royal Danish Mail.

== History ==
The company was founded by Johan Rudolph Thiele (1736-1815) in Copenhagen in 1771. On his death, the company was continued by his son H. H. Thiele (1787-1839). His two sons, Just Thielse (1823-1876)and Anders Thiele (1825-1907), were only 17 and 14 years old when their father died in 1839 and the company was therefore managed by an uncle for a few years until they were old enough to take over the operations.

Søren Wedege (born 1857), Just Thiele's son-in-law, became a partner in the company in 1896.

The company ceased operations in 1937.

== Location ==
The company was based at Valkendorfsgade 7 (now No. 7-9) in central Copenhagen. The two current buildings at the site were built for Just and Anders Thiele in 1870 and 1875.

== See also ==
- Thiele
