= 1804 in Denmark =

- Decades: 1780s; 1790s; 1800s; 1810s; 1820s
- See also: Other events of 1804; List of years in Denmark

Events from the year 1804 in Denmark.

== Incumbents ==
- Monarch – Christian VII
- Prime minister – Christian Günther von Bernstorff

== Events ==
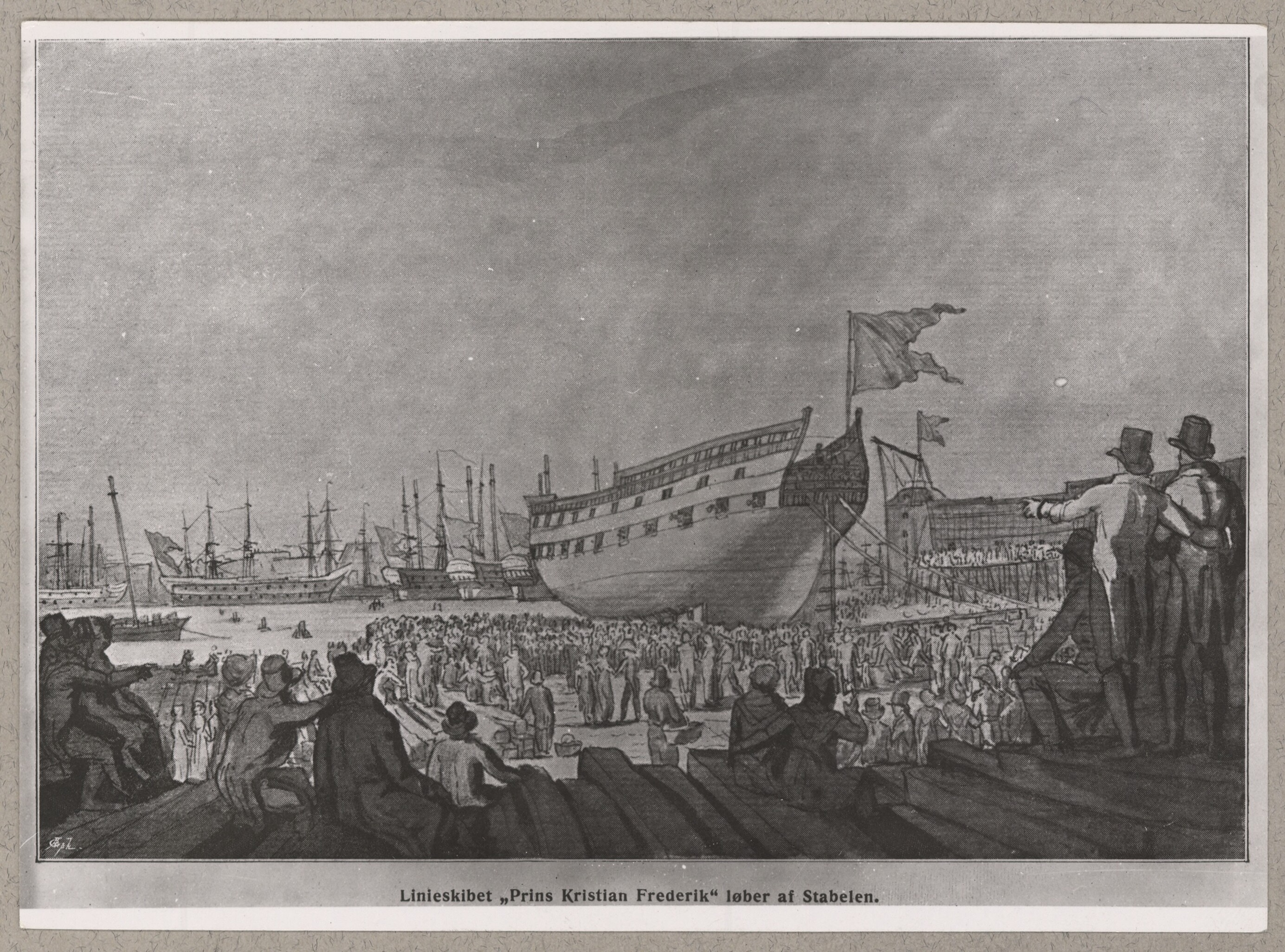
C. W. Eckersberg: HDMN Prinds Christian Frederik is launched from Oræosværftet in Copenhagen, 6 October 1804.

- 6 October – HDMS Prinds Christian Frederik is launched from Orlogsværftet on Nyholm in Copenhagen.

== Births ==
=== January–March ===
- 18 February – Christian Holm, painter (died 1846)
- 28 February – Carl van Dockum, naval officer (died 1893)
- 20 March – Wilhelm Bendz, painter (died 1832)

=== July–September ===
- 7 August – Johan Nicolai Madvig, philologist and politician (died 1886)
- 14 September – Niels Peter Holbech, painter (died 1889)

=== October–December ===
- 3 November – Constantin Hansen, painter (died 1880)
- 1 December – Carl Edvard Sonne, printmaker (died 1878)

== Deaths ==
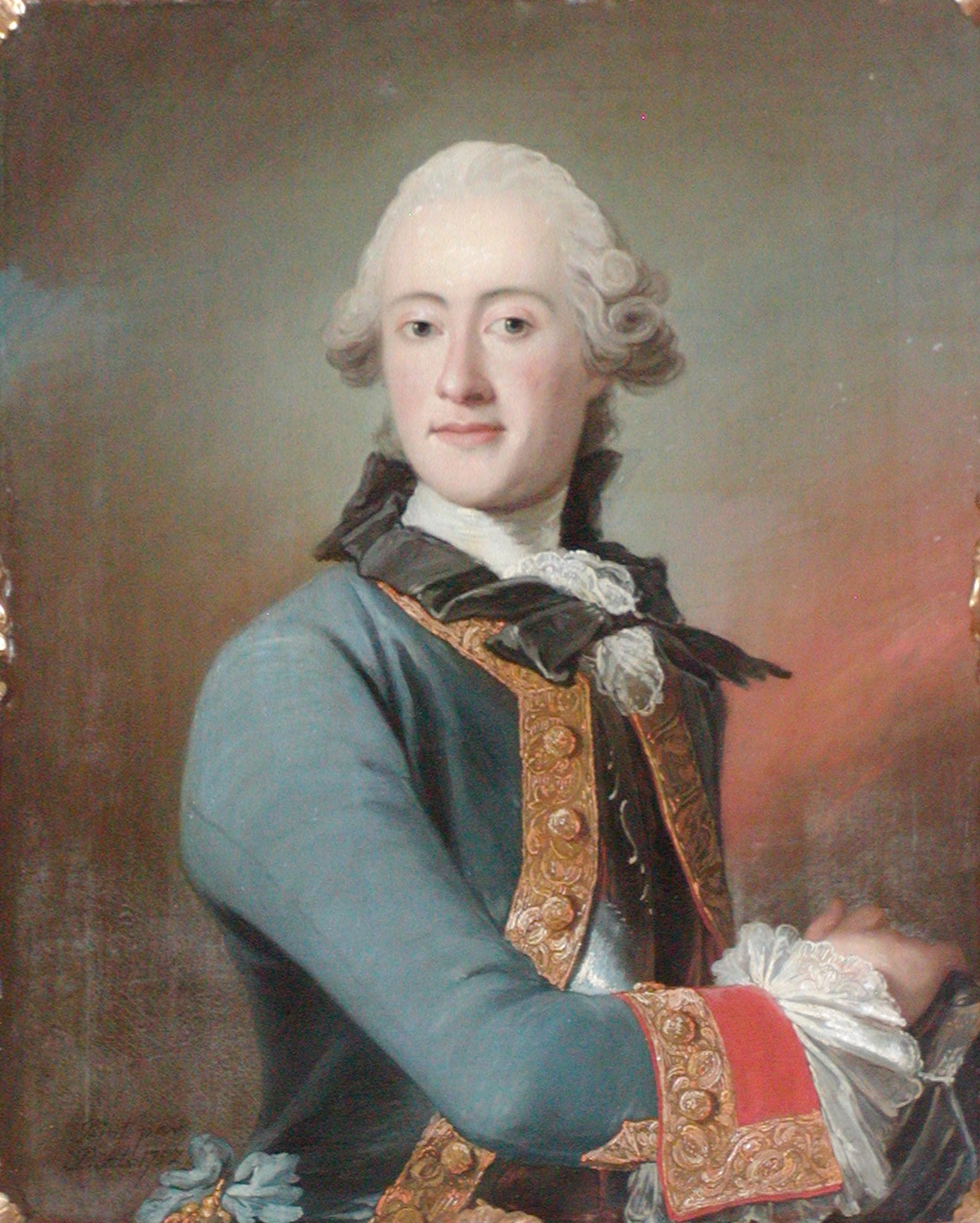
Frederik Christian Kaas.

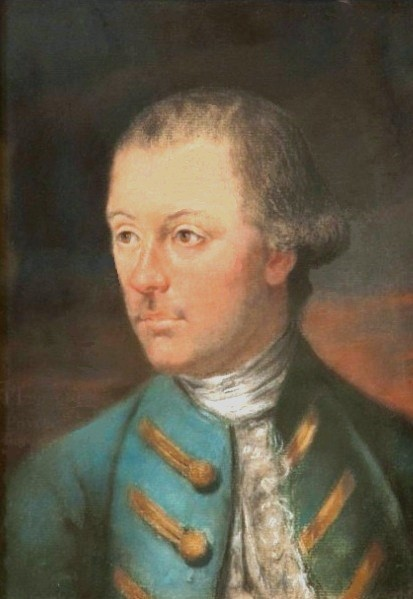
David Brown.

=== January–March ===
- 9 January — Frantz Hohlenberg, naval officer (born 1764)
- 28 March – Frederik Christian Kaas, Admiral, landowner (born 1727)

=== April–June ===
- 13 May – David Brown, merchant and Governor of Tranquebar (born 1734)
- 2 June – Cornelius Høyer, miniatures painter (born 1741)
- 26 June – Jørgen Landt, priest, botanist and author (born 1751)

=== July–September ===
- Marie Martine Bonfils, brewer
- 5 July – Jacob Baden, philologist, pedagogue, and critic (born 1735)
- 29 August – Niels Rybergm businessman (born 1725)
- 7 September – Christian Henrik Biering, clergy and writer (born 1729)

=== October–December ===
- 21 October – Poul Abraham Lehn, nobleman and landowner (born 1732)
- 24 December – Martin Vahl, naturalist (born 1749)
