= Johannes Frederik Fröhlich =

Danish violinist, conductor and composer

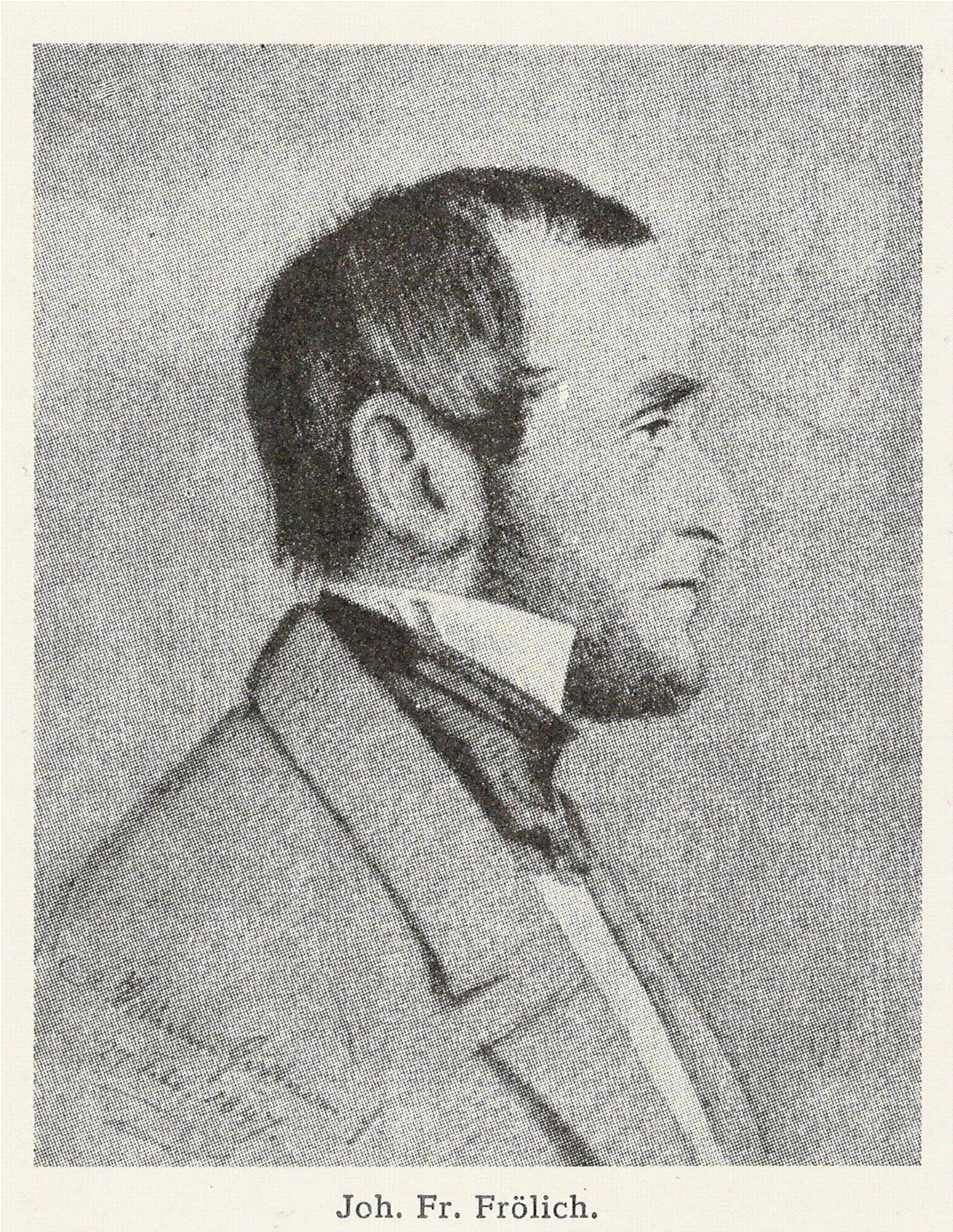
Johannes Frederik Frølich

Johannes Frederik Fröhlich (21 August 1806 – 21 May 1860) (or Frølich), a Danish violinist, conductor and composer, was a precursor of Niels Gade and J.P.E. Hartmann, and a central figure in Danish musical circles during the Romantic era.

== Biography ==
He was a pupil of violinists Claus Schall and Friedrich Kuhlau. From 1827 he worked at the Royal Theatre, Copenhagen, where he was chief conductor from 1836. Fröhlich was a co-founder of the Music Society of Copenhagen and its first chairman.

== Works ==
He wrote a symphony (in E-flat, Op. 33), and choral works and chamber music, as well as violin and piano compositions and a violin concerto. He wrote ballet music for the ballet-master and choreographer August Bournonville, founder of the Danish ballet tradition.

The main cache of his musical manuscripts is conserved in the Kongelige Bibliotek, Copenhagen.

== Notable works ==
- op. 1 Strygekvartet nr. 1 i d-mol (1825)
- op. 2 Strygekvartet nr. 2 i A-dur
- op. 3 violinkoncerter (1825)
- Ouverture til Kong Salomon og Jørgen Hattemager (1825)
- op. 4 Koncertino for Violin (1826)
- op. 6 Introduktion og Polonaise for Violin med Orkester
- op. 7 violinkoncert
- op. 14 violinkoncert
- op. 15 Strygekvartet (1827)
- op. 17 Strygekvartet (muligvis 3 kvartetter 1827)
- op. 19 Kvartet for 4 Horn (1827)
- op. 20 Koncertino for Violin og 4 horn (1827)
- Ouverture til Freias Alter (1828)
- op. 24 Introduktion og Rondo for Horn med Orkester (1829)
- Sonate i a-mol for Piano og Fløjte
- op. 30 Violinkoncert (1829)
- op. 30 Symfoni (1830)
- op. 33 Symfoni i E^{b}-dur
- Natten før Brylluppet (syngespil 1829)
- op. 39 koncertouverture for Orkester
- op. 40 Marche og Jagtstykke for 9 Horn (1832)
- Nina (ballet)
- Tyrolerne (ballet)
- Valdemar (ballet 1835)
- Festen i Albano (ballet 1839)
- Fædrelandets muser (ballet 1840)
- op. 51 Erik Menveds Barndom (ballet - med Riberhusmarch - 1843)
- Rafael (ballet 1845)
- Hertas Offer (ballet)
- Abekatten (vaudeville af Johanne Louise Heiberg)
- Majgildet (ouverture)
- Maurerbrüder hemmet nicht die Zähre
- Kantate til Christian 8.s kroningsfest
- En Søndag på Amager

== See also ==
- List of Danish composers
