= Harald Krenchel =

Danish fencer

Personal information
- Born: 28 May 1884 Viborg, Denmark
- Died: 9 January 1922 (aged 37) Copenhagen, Denmark

Sport
- Sport: Fencing

Harald Krenchel (28 May 1884 – 9 January 1922) was a Danish fencer. He competed in the individual sabre event at the 1908 Summer Olympics.
