= Jørgen Conradt =

Danish coppersmith (1771–1851)

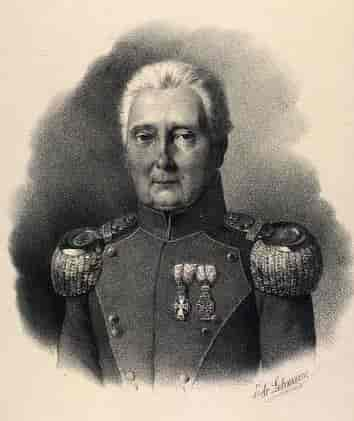
Jørgen Conradt by Edvard Lehmann, 1837.

Jørgen Conradt (20 February 1771 - 1 February 1851) was a Danish coppersmith. He started the Institute for Metalwork in his house on Købmagergade in Copenhagen. On his retirement, it was merged with the Institute of Advanced Technology.

== Early life and education ==
Conradt was born in Copenhagen on 20 February 1771, the son of coppersmith and borgerkaptajn Johan Joachim Conradt (c. 1739–1816) and Berthe Bentzen (c. 1748–1814). His father served as alderman of the Coppersmiths Guild in Copenhagen. Conradt completed his apprenticeship in his father's workshop in 1799 and later continued his education in England.

== Career ==
In 1792, Conradt established his own workshop at Købmagergade 11 in Copenhagen.He was a committee member of Selskabet til håndværkerstandens forædling i Danmark (Society for the Promotion of Crafts in Denmark). In November 1807, at private initiative, he established the Institute for Metalwork in his own house on Købmagergade. Apprentices from the metalworking trade received training in disciplines such as turning, engraving, driving and chiselling. The institution was not only frequented by apprentices but also by trained craftsmen and master craftsmen. In 1832, Conradt retired as director of the institute and it was instead placed under the Institute of Advanced Technology. In the late 1850s it was transferred to the Technical Society.

Conradt was also active in the Civilian Guard (borgervæbningen). He started out as a corporal, was later promoted to colonel and then to commander of the civilian infantry and artillery. From 1836 to 1848 he was Stadshauptmand in Copenhagen.

== Personal life ==
Ib 15 April 1796, Conradt married to Sophie Amalie Holm (7 April 1769 - 4 December 1842). She was a daughter of coppersmith Christian Berntsen Holm (c. 1722–89) and Kirstine Magdalene Haderslev (c. 1731-c. 1789).

== Awards ==
In 1728, Conradt was created a Knight in the Order of the Dannebrog. In 1836, he was awarded the Cross of Gonour.
