= Erik Magnussen =

Danish silversmith and designer

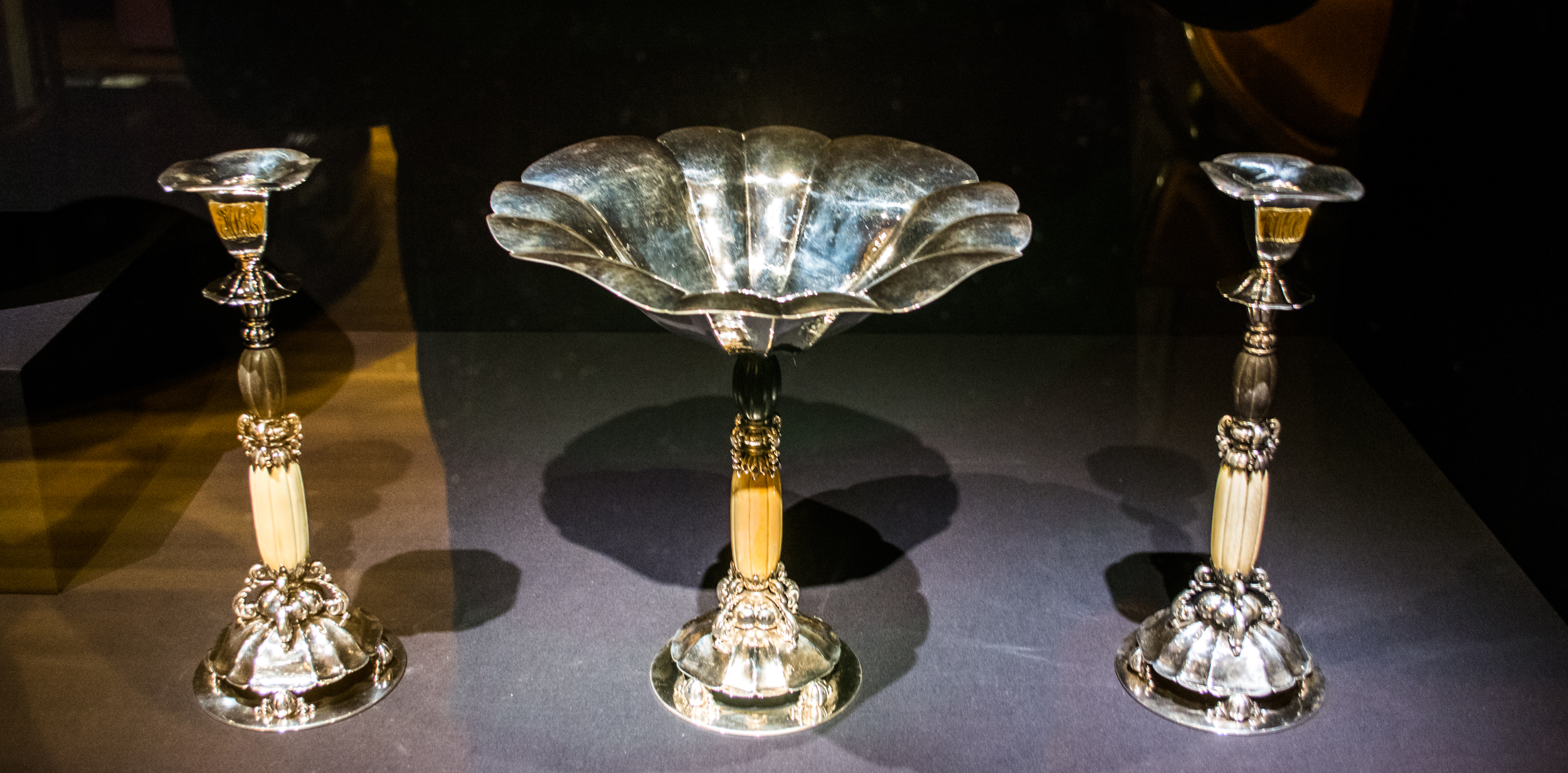
Console set was hand-made by Magnussen for the Women Decorators' Club show in New York City, 1927.

Erik Magnussen (14 May 1884 – 24 February 1961) was a Danish silversmith and designer. He was from 1925 to 1939 based in the United States, initially as artistic director of the Gorham Manufacturing Company in New York City and later with his own workshop in first Chicago and then Los Angeles.

== Life ==
=== Early life and education ===
Magnussen was born on 14 May 1884 in Frederiksberg, Copenhagen, the son of author and translator Johannes Julius Claudi Magnussen and Hedvig Charlotte Claudine Sommer.

In 1898–1901, Magnussen was a sculptor's apprentice in his uncle's art gallery Winkel & Magnussen. He also studied sculpting under Copenhagen-based Norwegian sculptor Stephan Sinding, and silver chasing under the silversmith Viggo Hansen (1859–1930). In 1907–09, he worked as a chaser in Otto Rohloff's workshop at the Unterrichtsanstalt des königlichen Kunstgewerbe-Museums (Royal School and Museum of Applied Arts) in Berlin, Germany.

=== Career in Denmark, 1908–25 ===
Back in Copenhagen, Magnussen opened his own jewelry and silver workshop, where he designed items in a style similar to that of Georg Jensen as well as various types of silver items. He closed the shop in 1912 and accepted a post as Director of the Department of Arts and Crafts at Bing & Grøndahl, where he designed porcelains decorated with gold and silver. In 1913, he left Bing & Grøndahl to once again open his own silver workshop. In 1922 one of his designs won the grand prize at thIndependence Centenary International Exposition in Rio de Janeiro.

In 1921–25, Magnussen worked for the P. Ipsens Enke terra cotta factory. He continued to make jewelry, and in 1922 one of his designs won the grand prize at the International Exposition in Rio de Janeiro.

=== America, 1925–39 ===
In 1925, Magnussen emigrated to the United States and set up a studio in New York City. That same year, the Gorham Manufacturing Company hired him as its artistic director to reinvigorate its line of household silver goods. Initially, he designed Neoclassical items with decorative elements such as domes, vines, talons, tulips, and fluting. In 1927, he attracted considerable attention by designing a Cubist-inspired tea set. However, Magnussen's work for Gorham began just as the Great Depression set in, and his work sold poorly. He left Gorham in 1929 to work for the New York branch of the German firm August Dingeldein & Sohn. In 1932, he moved to Chicago to set up his own workshop. He moved it to Los Angeles in 1933 and closed it in 1939.

=== Career in Denmark, 1939–1951 ===
In 1939, Magnussen returned to Denmark. Faced with a scarcity of materials after the unset of World War II, he mainly created jewelry.

He married Esther Margrethe Franck (13 October 1895 – 27 June 1992) a daughter of metalsmith and later rentier Frederik Wilhelm F. and Cathrine Frederikke Jensen, on 13 September 1941 in Skovshoved.

== Works ==
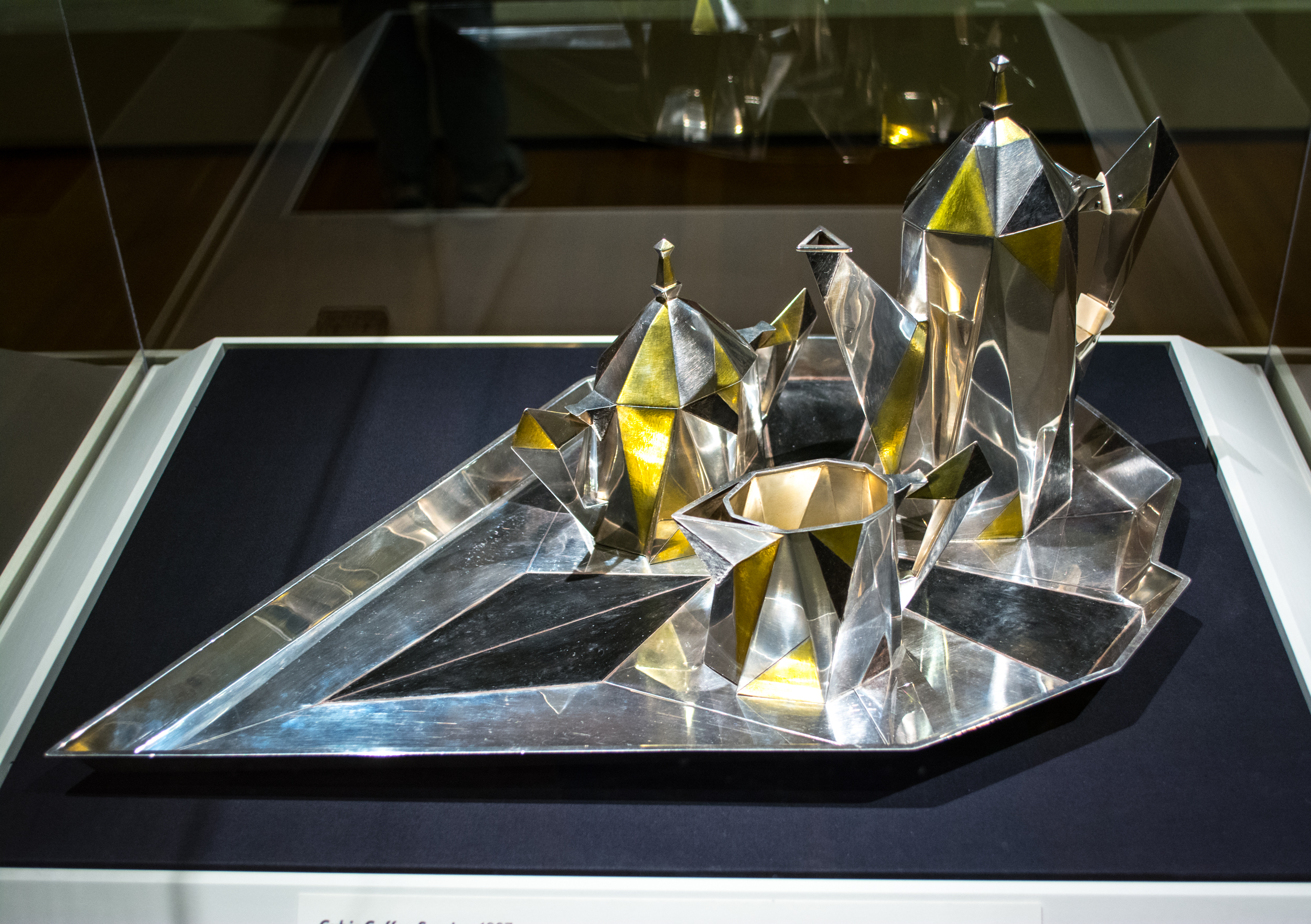
Cubist tea set, 1927

Magnussen's early jewelry is designed in the style locally known as Skønvirke. They are with their use of insects and semi-precious stones inspired by René Lalique. His work from the years in America are designed in the Art Deco style with inspiration from cubism and skyscraper architecture.
