= Georg Hilker =

Danish painter (1807–1875)

Georg Christian Hilker
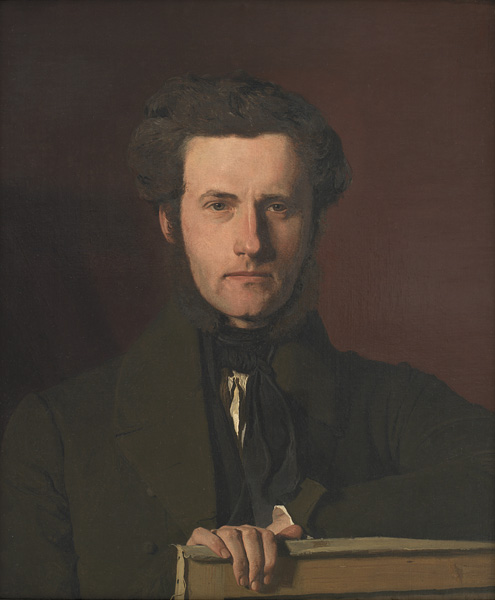
- Georg Hilker, portrait by Christen Købke (1837)
- Born: 5 June 1807; Copenhagen, Denmark
- Died: 13 January 1875 (aged 67); Copenhagen, Denmark
- Education: Royal Danish Academy of Fine Arts
- Known for: Decorative painting
- Movement: Danish Golden Age

Georg Hilker (5 June 1807 – 13 January 1875) was a Danish decorative painter active during the Danish Golden Age in the first half of the 19th century. He collaborated with painter Constantin Hansen (1804–1880).

== Early life and career ==
Hilker was born to navigator Christian Hilker and Marie Margrethe (née Vest) and Christian Hilker, a shipmaster who later served as a customs officer. At the age of 13, he enrolled at the Royal Danish Academy of Fine Arts. After first training in landscape painting and winning two silver medals at the model school, Hilker turned to decorative painting. While still a student, he participated in decorating the residence of Hermann Ernst Freund (1786–1840), an academy professor of sculpture, in the former Supply Building on Slotsholmen. This project introduced him to the Pompeian Styles which would characterize much of his later work. He also worked on other notable projects, including the decoration of Christiansborg and Amalienborg Palaces.

== Italy, 1838–41 ==
Hilker was awarded support from the Fonden ad usus publicos. He traveled to Rome traveled with the painter Christen Købke who had received a travel stipend from the Royal Academy. This gave him the opportunity to study Pompeian art and Raphael's works at the Vatican. The following summer, he also went to Naples, Pompeii and Capri where he lived and worked with Christen Købke and fellow Danish painters Constantin Hansen and Jørgen Roed.

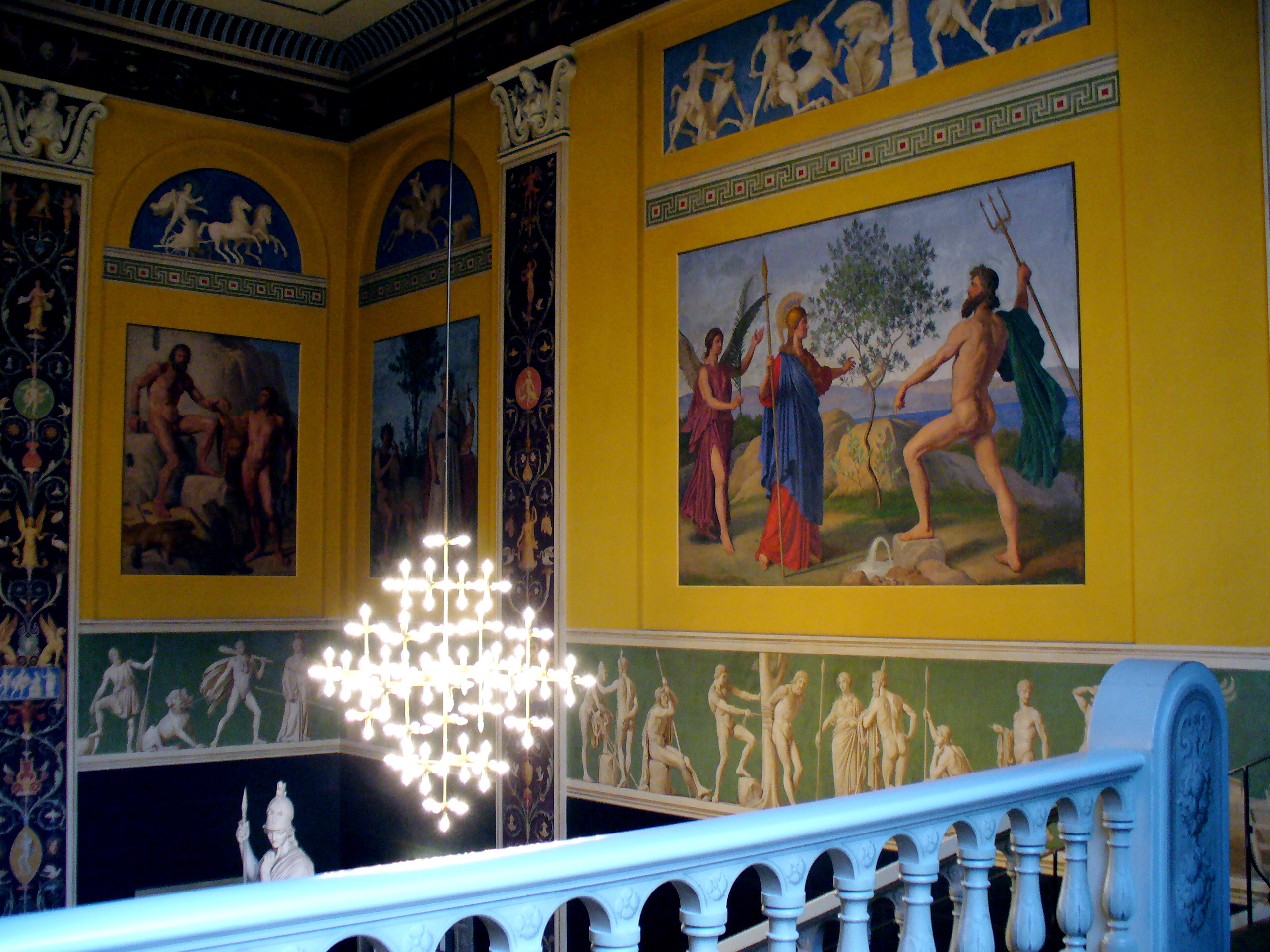
The vestibule in the main building of University of Copenhagen, with frescos by Hilker and Constantin Hansen

== Back in Denmark ==
Back in Denmark in 1841, Hilker's career was launched when he received an important commission from architect Michael Gottlieb Bindesbøll (1800–1856) to decorate rooms in Thorvaldsens Museum. Hilker commenced a collaboration with Constantin Hansen. One of their most important assignments was the decoration of the vestibule of the new main building for the University of Copenhagen from 1844 to 1853.

In 1847, Hilker married Elise Boline Schou (1820–1867). In 1848–49, he taught at the Copenhagen Technical College, and starting in 1853, he taught the Art Academy's decoration class. He was commissioned to decorate Festsalen at the Herlufsholm School (Herlufsholm Skole) at Næstved (1869–70), the Agricultural College at the Sorø Academy (1860–63), and the university's Festsal (1862–65), where he employed a rich neo-Renaissance style. Other commissions were Copenhagen's new bank building (1869) and various private properties in Copenhagen as well as in the province. These projects displayed antique motifs either directly or in the modified Neo-Renaissance form and frequently involved collaborations with other artists, especially Constantin Hansen.

Hilker's wife died in 1867. Shortly before his own death in 1875, he was appointed a knight of the Order of the Dannebrog. He was buried at the Assistens Cemetery (Copenhagen).

== See also ==
- Art of Denmark
