= Christian Holm (painter) =

Danish painter (1804–1846)

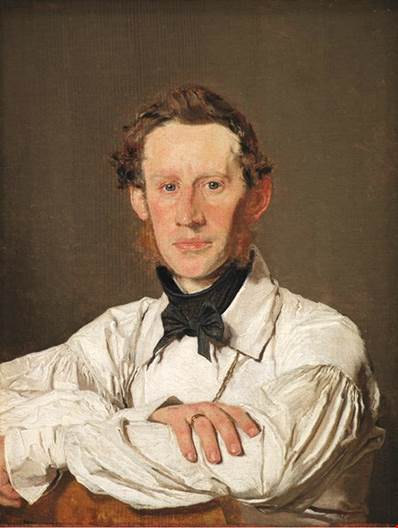
Christian Holm; portrait by Christen Købke (late 1840s)

Christian Frederik Carl Holm (18 February 1804, Copenhagen – 24 July 1846, Tivoli) was a Danish painter; known primarily for his animal and hunting scenes.

== Biography ==
His father was a goldsmith. As an only son, he was expected to follow his father's profession, but after arriving at the Royal Danish Academy of Fine Arts, decided to become an artist instead. He began by studying engraving with Johan Frederik Clemens, then did modeling, but eventually settled on being a painter. In 1823, he exhibited copies of paintings by Frans Pourbus the Younger, which he had seen at the Rijksmuseum.

Two years later, he won a silver medal and was studying with Christian David Gebauer. At first, he wanted to become a battle painter but, owing to a long period of peace, had no opportunity to observe a battle in person. Gebauer then encouraged him to become an animal painter, but he persisted with his plans and presented his interpretations of historical events, such as the Battle of Lützen and the Battle of Colberger Heide. The latter was purchased for the Royal Collection.

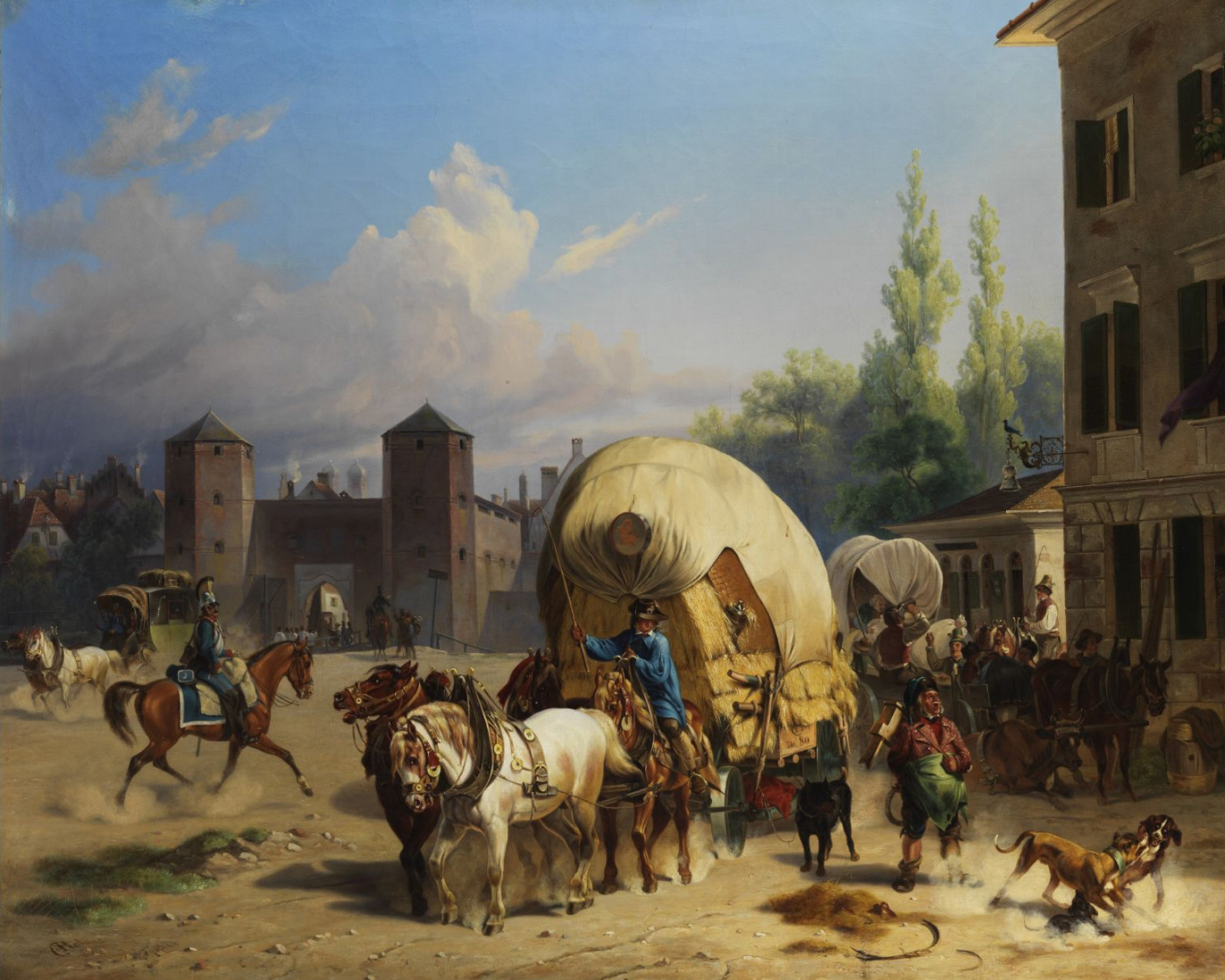
Colorful Bustle in Front of Sendlinger Tor in Munich (1840)

In 1829, he was granted money from the "Fonden ad usus publicos", a fund devoted to supporting the arts and sciences. This was meant to support him for two years but, in 1830, the second half was withheld due to lack of productivity. Nevertheless, he went to Dresden and Munich (apparently at his own expense) and took Gebauer's advice; producing his first serious animal paintings. In 1832, he married Rosalie Petit (1807-1873) and settled in Munich.

It was there that his career took hold; beginning with the sale of a large painting depicting a reindeer hunt to the prominent Jenisch family of Hamburg. He made several visits to Rome, beginning in 1838, and moved his family there in 1845. Shortly after, King Christian VIII ordered several paintings from him; some of which were not exhibited until after his death.

He apparently overworked himself in the hot summer sun and developed a fever. He died several days later, watched over by his wife and his friend, Albert Küchler, a painter who later became a Catholic friar. After the burial, his widow Rosalie returned to Copenhagen with their children and took up engraving, which Christian had taught her.

== Other sources ==
- Christian Holm from Bryan's Dictionary of Painters and Engravers @ Google Books.
- Christian Holm. In: Ulrich Thieme, Felix Becker: Allgemeines Lexikon der Bildenden Künstler von der Antike bis zur Gegenwart. Vol.17, E. A. Seemann, Leipzig 1924, pg.387.
