= Lars Bache =

Danish ferryman and privateer

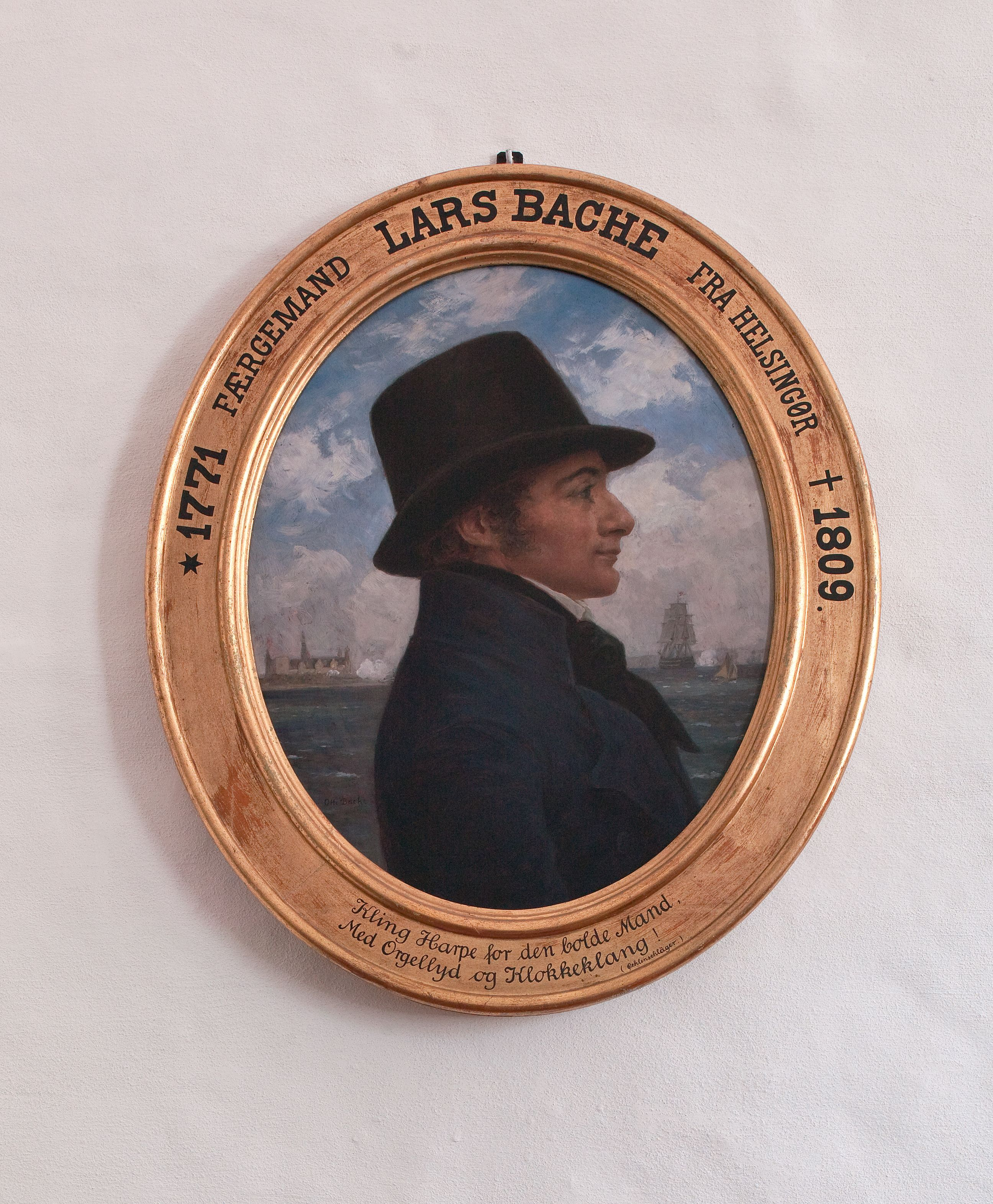
Epitaph in Lyderslev Church

Lars Bache (10 February 1771 – 26 July 1809) was a Danish ferryman and privateer. He was the grandfather of painter Otto Bache.

== Early life ==
Bache was born in Helsingør, the son of ferryman Niels Bache (1745–1775) and Johanne Gregersdatter (1738–1781). After his father's death, his mother married ferryman Niels Nielsen Leth in 1777.

== Career ==
Lars Bache became a ferryman in his home town. On 3 November 1801, together with five other men, during a storm at the Roads of Copenhagen, Bache managed to rescue the crew from a capsized Flensburg brig. The wholesale merchant Hans Staal Hagen, who had spotted the desperate situation, had promised a reward of 100 Danish rigsdaler to whoever could save them. Bache refused to receive the money, asking that the money instead be distributed among the crew members, stating that he "did not save people for money". The incident made him an instant celebrity. The king awarded him a medal Pro meritis, Grosserer-Societetet presented him with a silver cup, Adam Oehlenschläger honoured him with a poem, and Frederik Høegh-Guldberg also mentions him in his writings. In 1807, during the Battle of Copenhagen, he brought dispatches from Kronborg to Copenhagen at great risk to his life. On 10 November in the same year he obtained a letter of mark for his ferry boat Makrelen, with which he and a select crew targeted British merchant shipping.

== Personal life and legacy ==
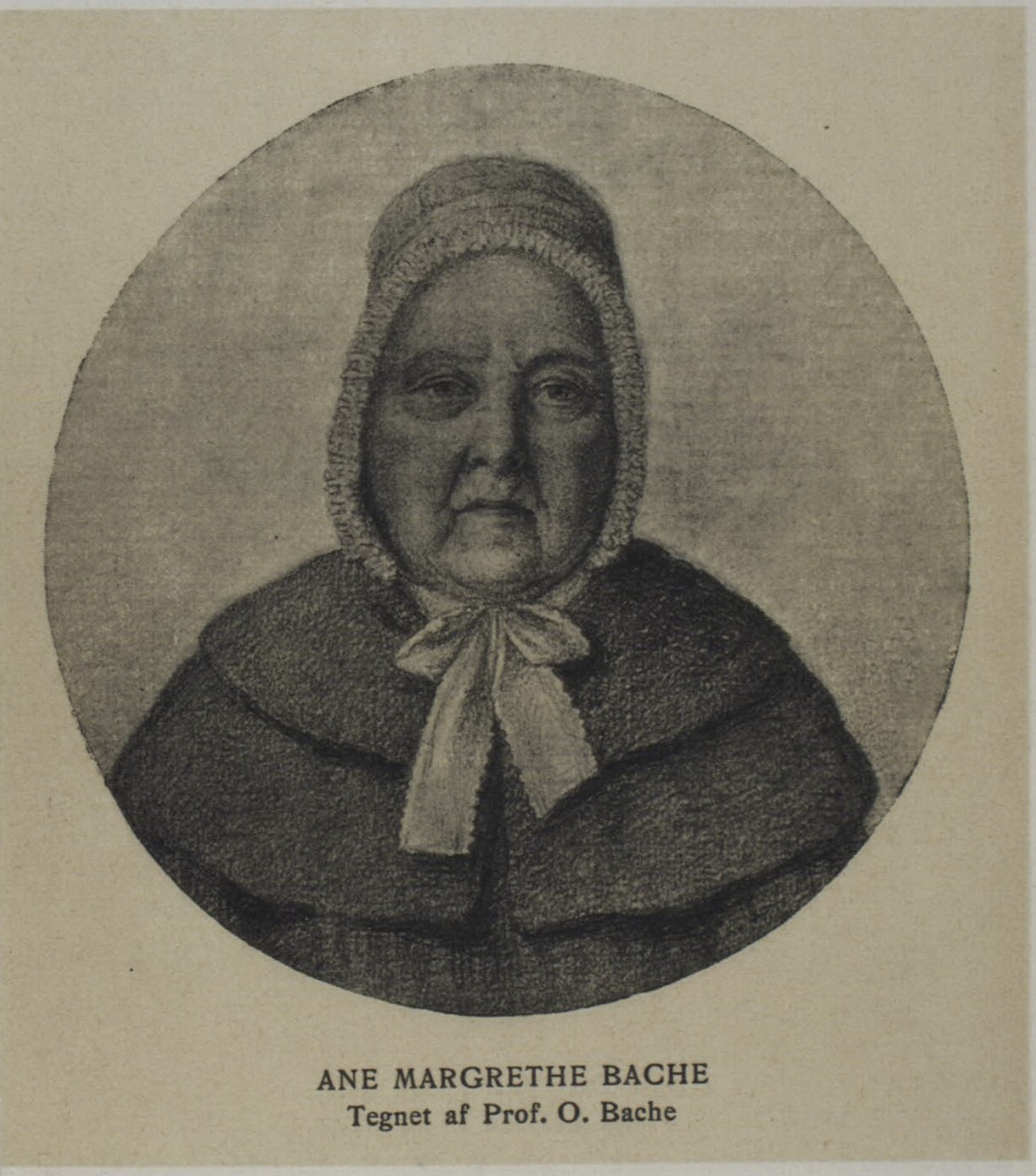
Ane Margrethe Bache

On 27 November 1795 in St. Olai's Church in Helsingør, Bache married Anne Margrethe Bache (1772–1857), daughter of fisherman and strandfoged in Rungsted Ole Olsen Bagge (1746–1802) and Marie Larsdatter (1745–1814). She had until then served as housekeeper for Nicolas Fenwick, at Strandgade 85–87. In 1801, Bache purchased Stengade 27.

On 26 July 1809, the Makrellen sailed in a storm off Stevns, and the entire crew drowned. Lars Bache's body drifted ashore on 7 August 1809 on Vemmetofte foreshore. He was buried at Lyderslev Cemetery.

Bache's widow moved to Copenhagen in 1821. She died in Copenhagen in 1857. Their eldest son Niels has described his childhood memories in his memoirs. He was the father of painter Otto Bache and school director Niels Bache. An epitaph to Lars Bache painted by his grandson was installed in Lyderslev Church in 1901. A Cenotaph is located Helsingør Cemetery. The stone has later been moved to his mother's grave.
