= Thiele (retail opticians) =

Thiele is a chain of retail opticians headquartered in Copenhagen, Denmark. The company is owned by Jens Henrik Brandt (95%) and Profil Optik (5%).

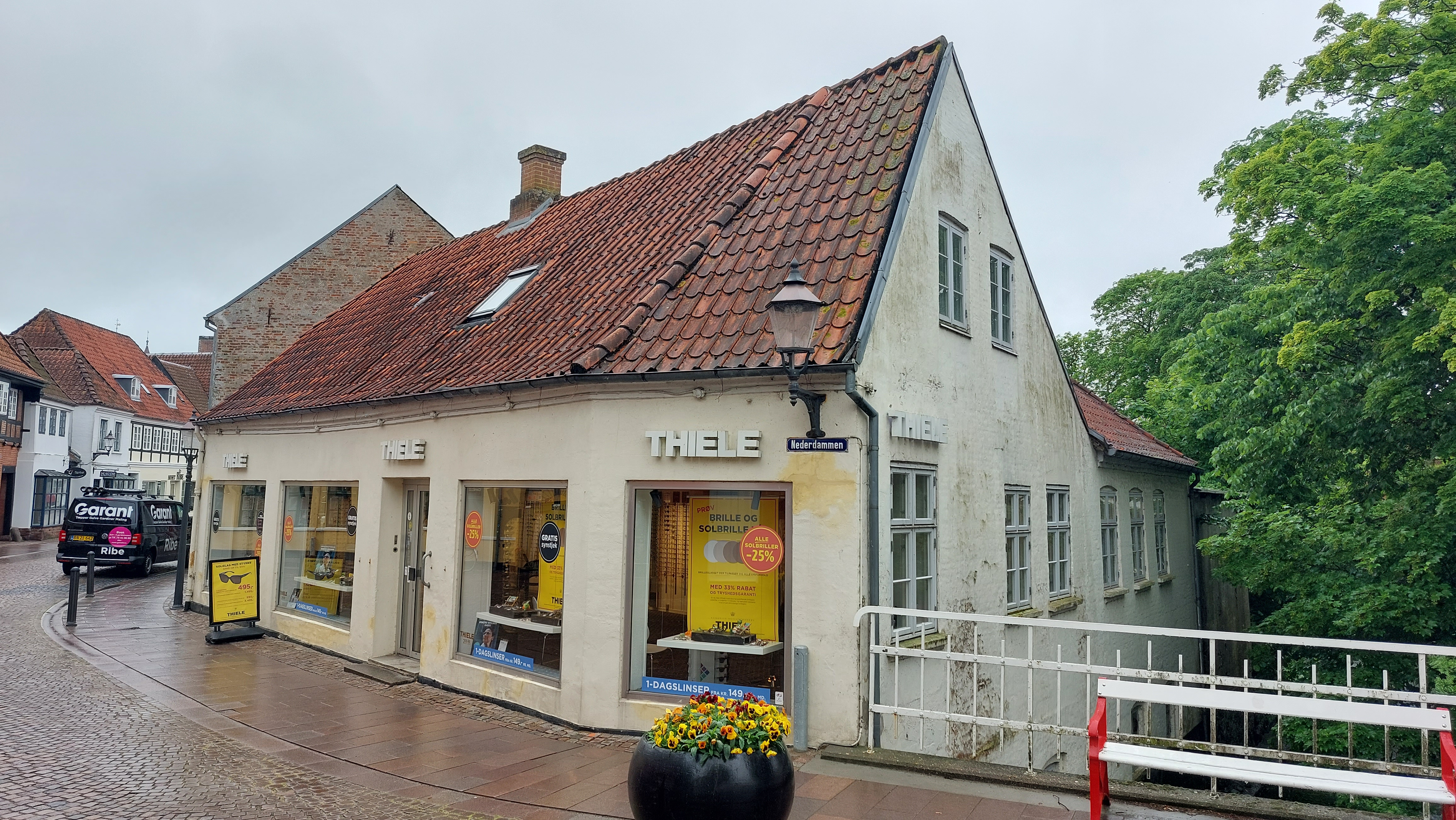

== History ==
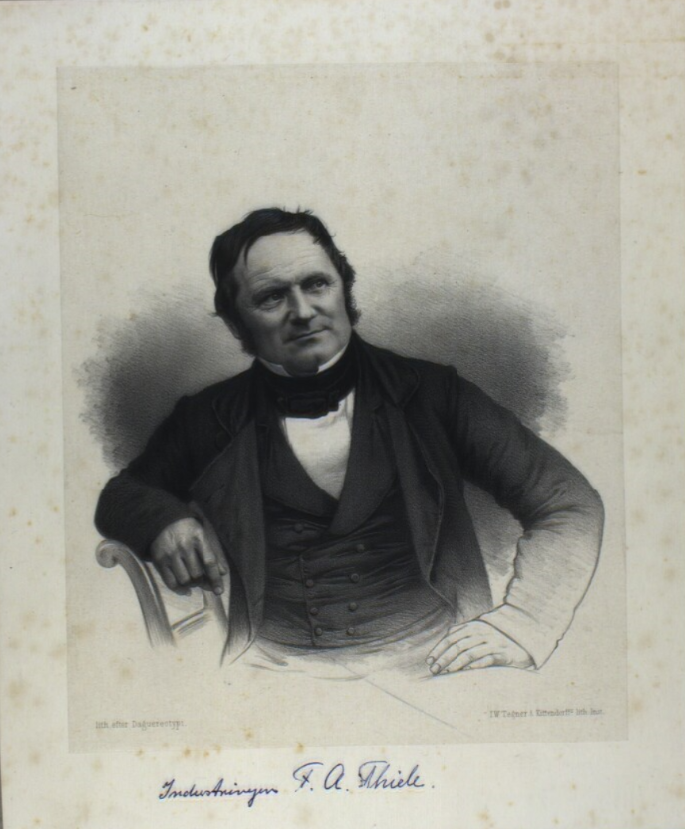
Frederik Anton Thiele, lithography by I.W. Tegner & Kittendorff

The company was founded in 1817 when Frederik Anton Thiele (1792-1859) was granted a royal license to "manufacture and sell any kind of astronomic, mathematical, chemical, physical, optical, mineralogical and mechanical instrument or device".

His son Johan Christian Thiele, who had studied both at the College of Advanced Technology and abroad, took on the company following the death of his father in 1859. He expanded the business but died just 39 years old in 1871. His widow then continued the operations until their son Frederik Axel Thiele (1866-1944) was ready to join it in 1888 after completing his training in Professor Jürgensen's mechanical workshop and at the College of Advanced Technology. He was the sole owner of the company from 1891. His eldest son, Johan F. A. Thiele, joined him in 1921.

The company was converted into an aktieselskab in 1824. It was granted status of Purveyors to the Court of Denmark in 1931.

The first branch opened in Bispestræde in Aalborg in 1929. Ot was followed by many new branches in the 1960s and 1970s.

Jens F.A. Thiele, fifth generation of the Thiele family to own the company, sold it to Jens Henrik Brandt (95 %) and Profil Optik (5 %) in 2005.
