= Peder Rosenstand-Goiske =

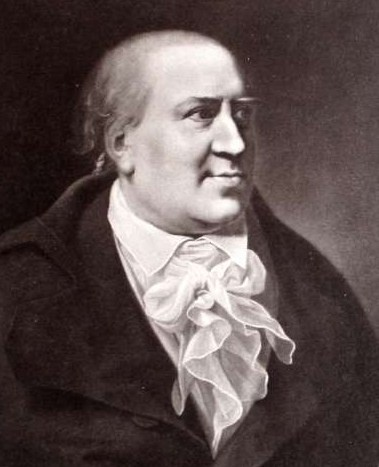
Peder Rosenstand-Goiske

Peder Rosenstand-Goiske (1752 – 6 February 1803) was a Danish playwright and lawyer. As a 19-year-old student in October 1771 he anonymously published the first issue of Den Dramatiske Journal (The Dramatic Journal), the oldest Danish theater magazine. He lived during the time of Denmark-Norway.

== Education and career ==
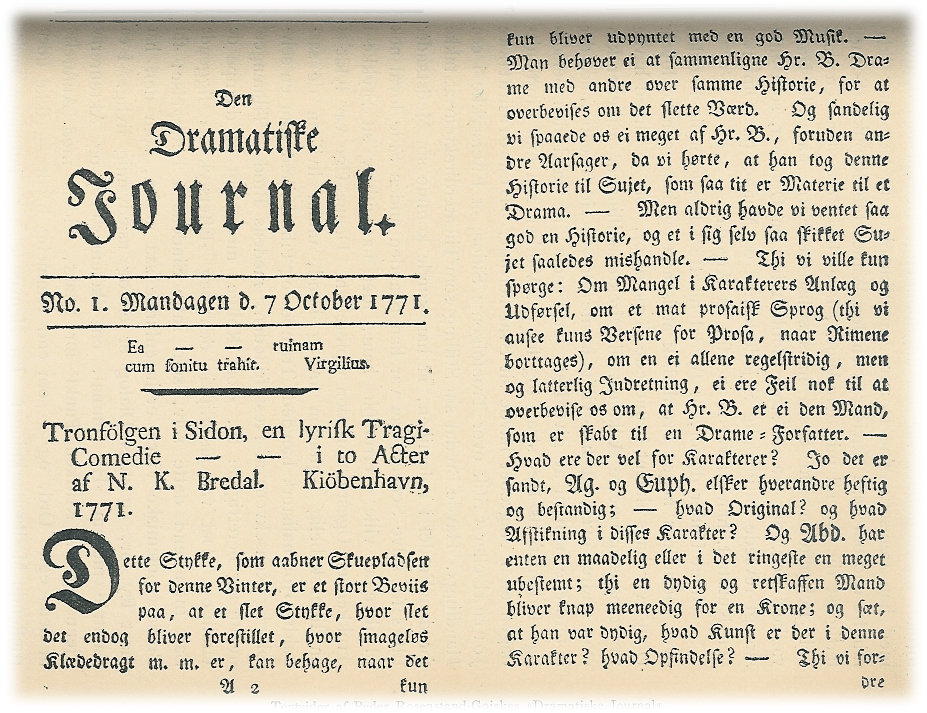
Den Dramatiske Journal No. 1 for Monday 7 October 1771

Rosenstand-Goiske was taught by his father, the theological professor P. Rosenstand-Goiske (1704–69) and graduated in 1769. As a young man deep in aesthetic and in particular dramaturgical studies, Lessing's Hamburgische dramaturgie had made a strong impression on him, and he decided to give it a Danish counterpart. The first issue of Den Dramatiske Journal was released in October 1771, making it the first Danish theater magazine, which, despite its short two-season lifespan, became a very important source of national theatrical history.

A sharp criticism of theater director Niels Area Bredal's 1771 operetta Tronfølgen i Sidon egging this to open a polemic against the unwelcome a reviewer from the scene boards with by piece Den Dramatiske Journal, which gave rise to a tremendous scandal with fights and uproar in the theater house. It was this "dramatic war" which spawned Ewald's De brutale Klappere. Another theater historical work of Rosenstand-Goiske, Kritiske Efterretninger om den danske Skueplads (Critical news of the Danish Theater) (1778–80) remained in manuscript until it was published by Christian Molbech in 1839.

In 1780 Rosenstand-Goiske became employed as theater censor, and between 1786 and 1792, he was also a member of the theater management. At the same time he worked as a lawyer. In 1775 he took the Danish legal examination, and the following year he was auditor, and in 1783, after passing in Latin-law degree, an attorney by Supreme Court. For three years (1794–97), he served as Deputy Prime Minister and Prime Minister in Norway, and thrived there.

== About the understanding of the genre ==
Gerhard Schepelern wrote that Rosenstand-Goiske harshly judged songs from plays that do not reveal the importance of the music's role as conveyor of action, ideas and mood. The same attitude was shared by Knud Lyne Rahbek, who for many years pursued the music-dramatic genre from the same viewpoint. Rahbek considered it "a devastating poison that not only kills our theater, but spears our National-Character". According to Schepelern, Rosenstand-Goiske was the only person in those years who publicly expressed a deeper understanding of the essence of operatic art.
