= Rasmus Nielsen (philosopher) =

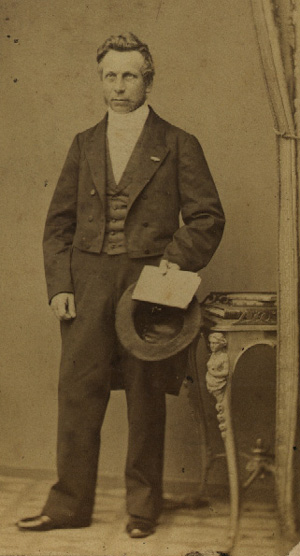
a photo of Rasmus Nielsen

Rasmus Nielsen (4 July 1809 – 30 September 1884) was a Danish philosopher and professor, as well as a critic of Søren Kierkegaard.

Nielsen was the son of a farmer. He studied theology at the University of Copenhagen, starting in 1832 and graduating in 1837. He then went on to get a licentiate degree and, after giving some lectures on theological topics, succeeded Poul Martin Møller as professor of moral theology.

== Bibliography ==
- Philosophical Propadeutic (Danish: Philosophike Propœdeutik)
- The Logic of Basic Concepts or The Logic of Fundamental Ideas (Danish: Grundideernes Logik), 1864
- The Philosophy of Religion (Danish: Religionsfilosofi), 1869
