= Johan Thomas Flindt =

Norwegian politician (1777–1856)

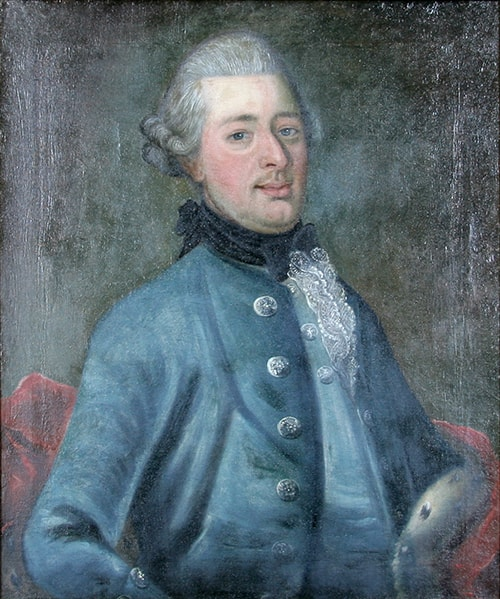
- Portrait of Flindt by Ulrich Ferdinand Beenfeldt in Copenhagen Police Headquarters.

Chief of Copenhagen Police Force
- In office 1788–1794
- Monarch: Christian VII
- Preceded by: Christian Fædder
- Succeeded by: Christian Magdalus Thestrup Cold
- Constituency: Copenhagen Police Force

Personal details
- Born: 3 October 1741 Kerteminde, Denmark
- Died: 10 November 1805 (aged 64) Copenhagen, Denmark
- Occupation: Chief of police

Johan Thomas Flindt (8 October 1741 - 10 November 1805) served as chief of police in Copenhagen from 1788 to 1794.

== Early life and education ==
Flindt was born on 8 October 1741 in Kerteminde, the son of army officer Henrik Flindt (1716–91) and Vilhelmine Charlotte Merckel (1725–1802). He earned a degree in Danish law (as opposed to Latin law) from the University of Copenhagen in 1763.

== Career ==
In 1768, Flindt was employed as byfoged in Rudkøbing and herredsfoged of Langeland Herred. In 1769, he was awarded the title of generalauditør.

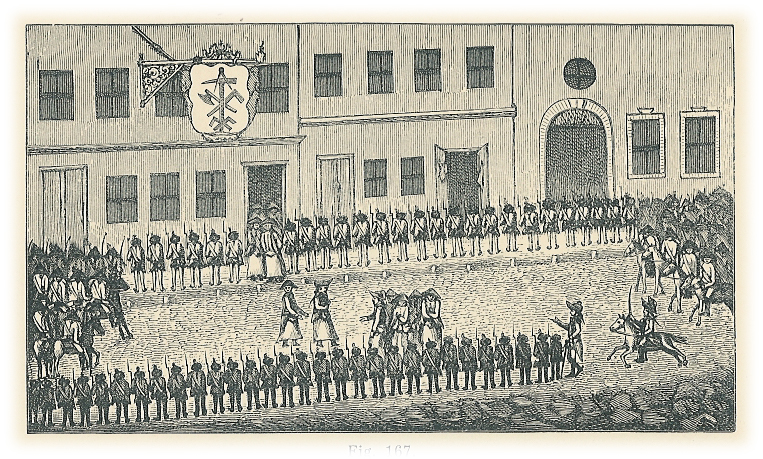
The Copenhagen Carpenters Strike.

On 6 June 1788, he succeeded Christian Fædder as chief of police in Copenhagen. The background for selecting a young and inexperienced low-ranking official from a rather remote island in the provinces for the important position in the capital is not known. In 1783, he was also appointed deputy burgermaster. In 1790. he confiscated Peter Andreas Heiberg's Indtogsvise and presented the author the a fine of 150 rigsdaler. The intervention made him very unpopular in the population. His poor handling of the so-called Post Office Riots (Posthusfejden) and Filosofgangen Riots (fiolsofgangesfejden) as well as the 1794|Carpenter Strike made him even more unpopular with the city's population. On 12 August 1794, he handed in his resignation.

== Personal life ==
On 19 April 1769, Flindt married to Birgitte (Berta) Cathrina Thrane (1730–1797). She was the widow of byfoged in Rudkøbing Christian Pedersen Møller til Vejstrupgård and Biskopstorp(1717–68). Her parents were estate manager at Kørupgård Rasmus Thrane (died 1755) and Dorothea Frederikke van Haven (1693–1762).

Flindt's son Henrik Wilhelm Flindt (1770–1817) was an army officer wityh rank of ritmester. He was married to Nielsine Henrikke de Moldrup (1776–1839), a daughter of chamberlain Peder Jensen de Moldrup (1735–1787) of Vestervig Kloster and Ørum Slot. Flindt died on 10 November 1805 and is buried at Assistens Cemetery.
