= 1968 in Denmark =

- Decades: 1940s; 1950s; 1960s; 1970s; 1980s
- See also: Other events of 1968; List of years in Denmark

Events from the year 1968 in Denmark.

== Incumbents ==
- Monarch – Frederik IX
- Prime minister – Jens Otto Krag

== Events ==
- 12 February – The Balle Hoard is discovered in Balle near Grenå.
- 7 June – The Original Legoland opens.

== Sports ==
- August – Ole Ritter becomes the first non-Italian to win the Trofeo Matteotti.

== Births ==
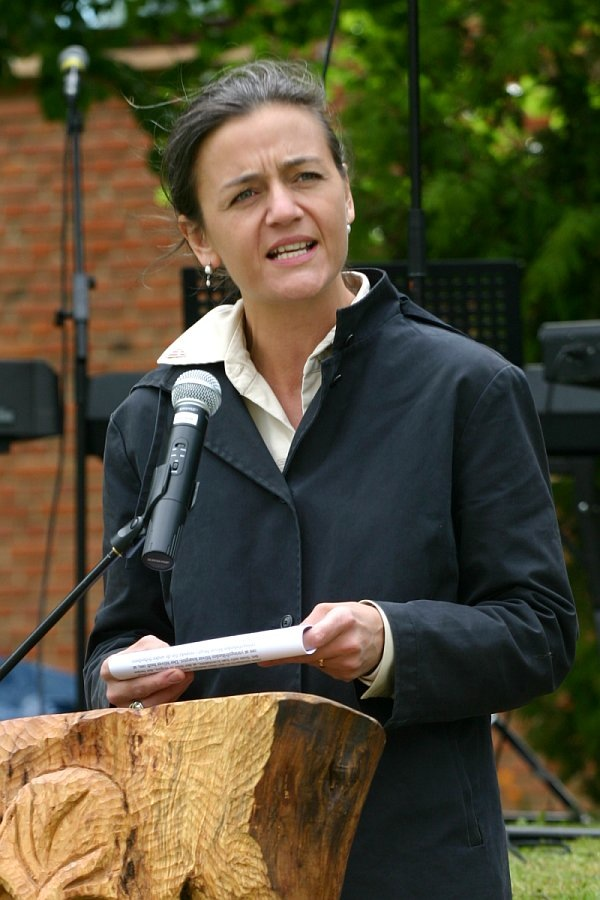
Margrethe Vestager.

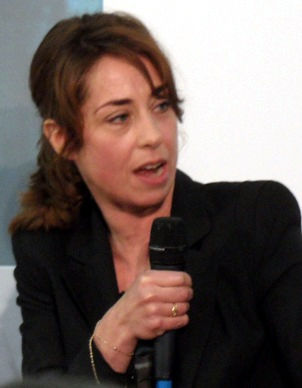
Sofie Gråbøl.

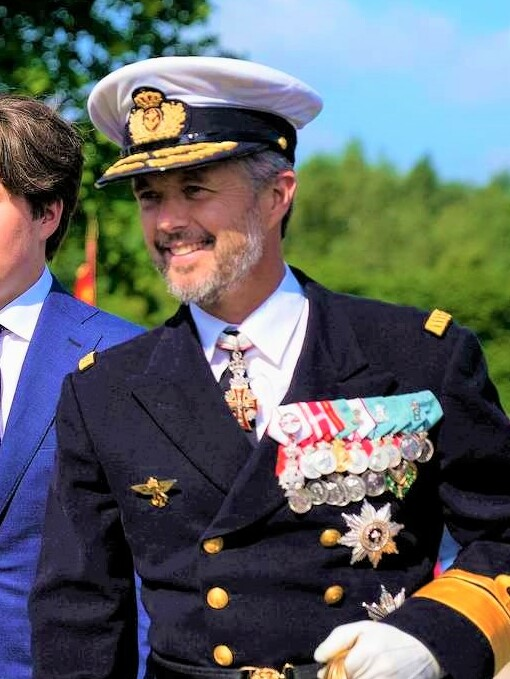
King Frederik X

=== January–March ===
- 7 February – Katja K, former pornographic actress
- 12 February – Lisbeth Zornig Andersen, economist and author

=== April–June ===
- 12 April – Signe Wenneberg, journalist, environmental activist and politician
- 13 April – Margrethe Vestager, politician
- 17 April – Julie Fagerholt, fashion designer
- 26 May – Frederik X, King of Denmark
- 19 June – Peter Tanev, weather presenter and author

=== July–September ===
- 30 July – Sofie Gråbøl, actress
- 2 August – Thomas Lund, badminton player
- 10 August – Lene Rantala, handball player
- 22 August – Casper Christensen, comedian
- 27 August – Johnny Bredahl, boxer
- 13 September – Ole Bjur, footballer

=== October–December ===
- 21 November – Jørgen Vig Knudstorp, businessman
- 22 November – Sidse Babett Knudsen, actress
- 2 December – Jan Grarup, photographer
- 25 December – Helena Christensen, model

== Deaths ==
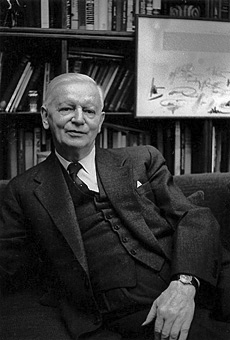
Carl Theodor Dreyer.

=== January–March ===
- 18 January – Adam Fischer, sculptor (born 1888)
- 4 March – Ellen Price, actress and ballerina (born 1878)
- 20 March – Carl Theodor Dreyer, film director (born 1889)

=== April–June ===
- 11 April – Ellen Aggerholm, actress (born 1882)
- 19 April – Poul Reumert, actor (born 1883)
- 8 May – Ernst Hansen, painter (born 1892)
- 21 June – Ingeborg Spangsfeldt, actress (born 1895)

=== July–September ===
- 3 September – Carl Pedersen, rower (born 1884)

=== October–December ===
- 18 October – Eyvin Andersen, composer (born 1914 in the United States)
- 8 December – Anders Petersen, sport shooter, competitor at the 1920 Summer Olympics (born 1876)
- 31 December – Einar Middelboe, footballer (born 1883)

== See also ==
- 1968 in Danish television
