= 1815 in Denmark =

- Decades: 1790s; 1800s; 1810s; 1820s; 1830s
- See also: Other events of 1815; List of years in Denmark

Events from the year 1815 in Denmark.

== Incumbents ==
- Monarch – Frederick VI
- Prime minister – Joachim Godske Moltke

== Events ==
May

- 22 May – The wedding of Prince Christian and Caroline Amalie of Augustenburg takes place at Augustenborg Palace.

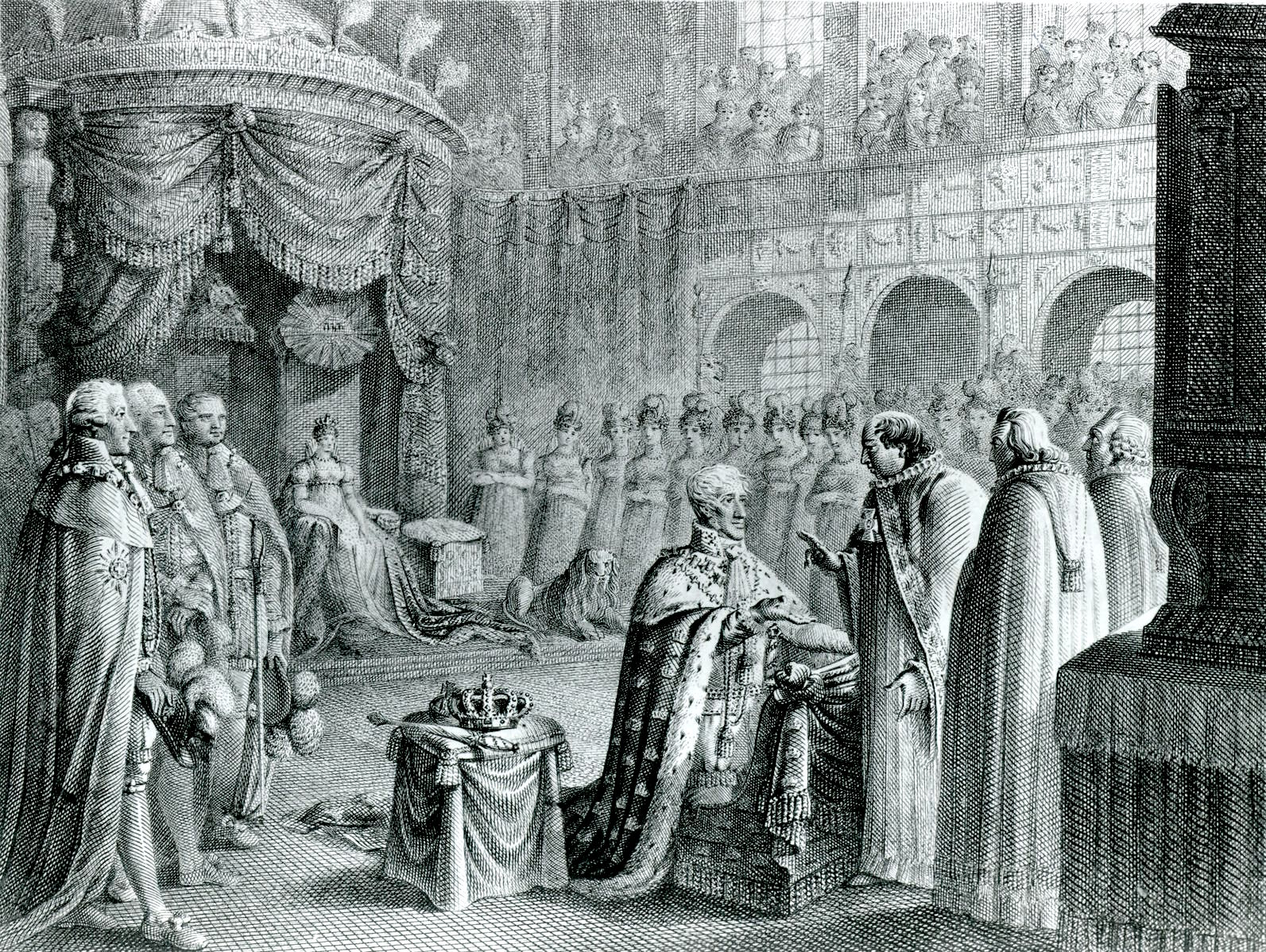
31 July: Anointment of King Frederick VI of Denmark in Frederiksborg Castle Church.

October

- 31 July – The anointment of King Frederick VI of Denmark takes place at Frederiksborg Chapel.

December

- 13 December – The County of Hardenberg Reventlow is established by Christian Henrik August Hardenberg-Reventlow from the manors of af Hardenberg (Krenkerup), Christiansdal, Nielstrup, Rosenlund, Nørregård and Sæbyholm.

== Births ==
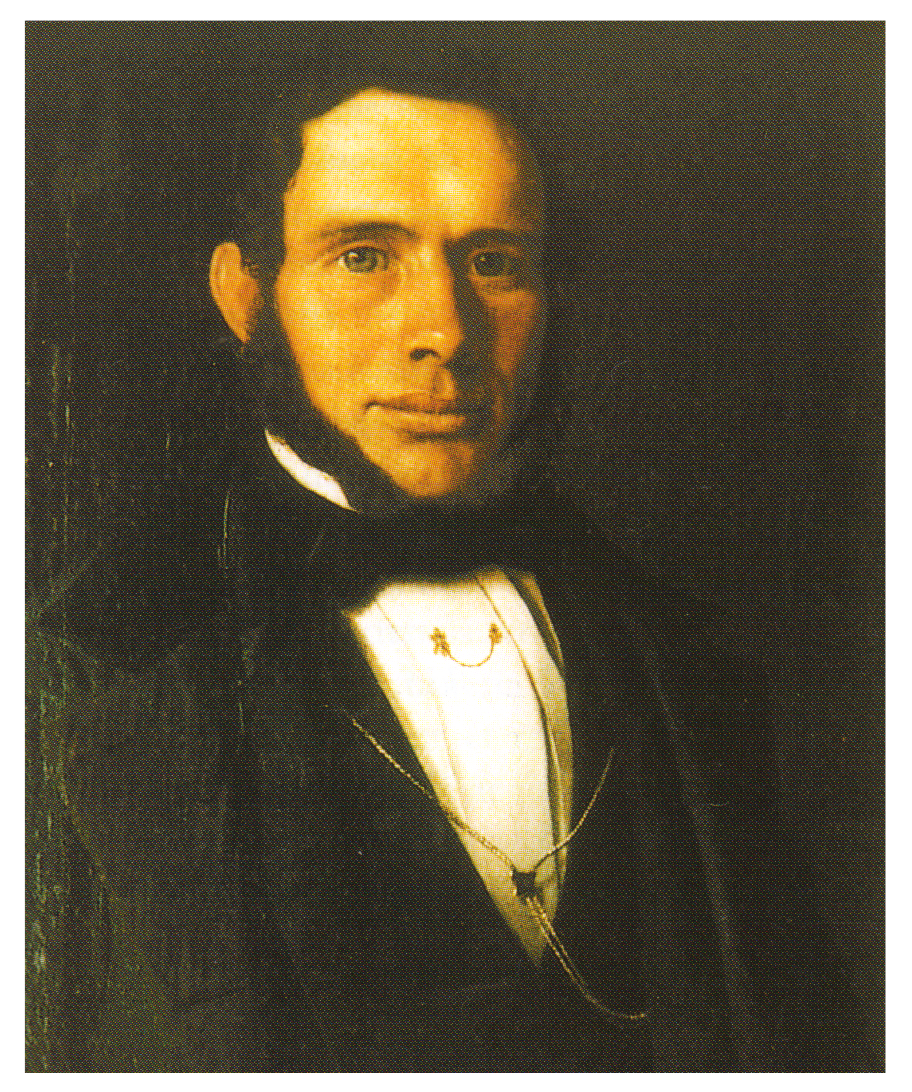
Hans Nielsen Jeppesen.

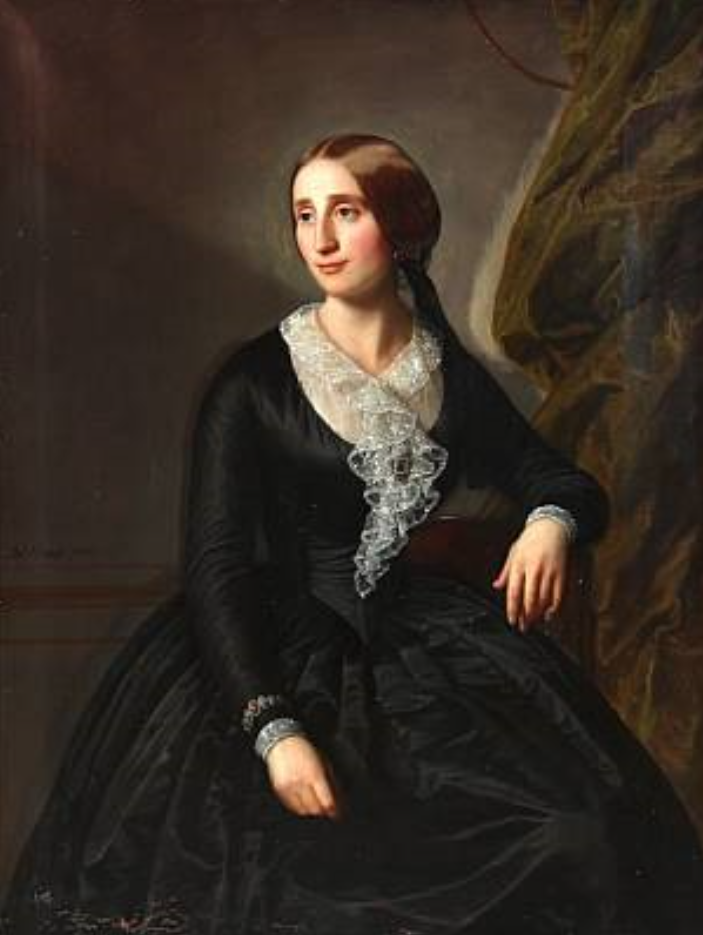
Erhardine Adolphine Hansen.

=== January–March ===
- 15 February – Hans Nielsen Jeppesen, businessman (died 1883)
- 16 February – Wilhelm Sponneck, nobleman and politician, Danish finance minister (died 1888)

=== April–June ===
- 21 April – Louise Rasmussen, ballet dancer and stage actor (died 1874)
- 23 June – Isaac Wilhelm Tegner, lithographer (died 1893)

=== July–September ===
- 29 July – Anker Heegaard, businessman (died 1893)
- 23 September – Erhardine Adolphine Hansen, actress (died 1893)

=== October–December ===
- 29 December – Hans Jørgen Hammer, painter (died 1882)

== Deaths ==
- 15 January – Thomas Bugge, astronomer and surveyor (born 1740)
- 30 January – Johan Rudolph Thiele, book printer, company founder (born 1736)
- 10 April – Frederik Carl Krag-Juel-Vind-Frijs, landowner, Supreme Court justice and county governor (born 1864)
- 20 December – Carl Conrad Gustav Knuth, landowner (born 1761)
