= 1893 in Denmark =

- Decades: 1870s; 1880s; 1890s; 1900s; 1910s
- See also: Other events of 1893; List of years in Denmark

Events from the year 1893 in Denmark.

== Incumbents ==
- Monarch – Christian IX
- Prime minister – J. B. S. Estrup

== Events ==
- 19 May – B 93 is founded.
- October – The first edition of Johannes Jørgensen's Taarnet is published.
- 7 November – Aarhus Municipal Hospital opens with a building designed by architect Thomas Arboe.

Undated

- Akademisk Boldklub wins the 1892–93 Football Tournament.

== Births ==
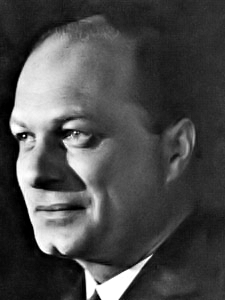
Kay Fisker.

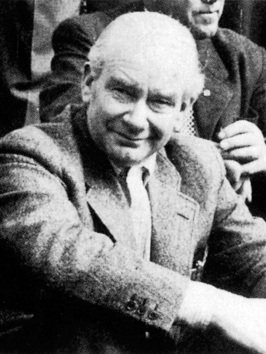
Carl Theodor Sørensen.

=== January–March ===
- 26 January – Christian Arhoff, actor (died 1973)
- 5 February – Alsing Andersen, politician (died 1962)
- 14 February – Kay Fisker, architect (died 1965)
- 21 March – Emil Bønnelycke, poet (died 1953)

=== April–June ===
- 26 May – Vilhelm Lundstrøm, painter (died 1950)
- 12 June – Helga Frier, actress (died 1972)

=== July–September ===
- 24 July – Carl Theodor Sørensen, landscape architect (died 1979)
- 28 July – Rued Langgaard, composer and organist (died 1952)
- 4 August – Tom Kristensen, poet and critic (died 1974)

=== October–December ===
- 25 December – Prince Viggo, Count of Rosenborg (died 1970)

== Deaths ==
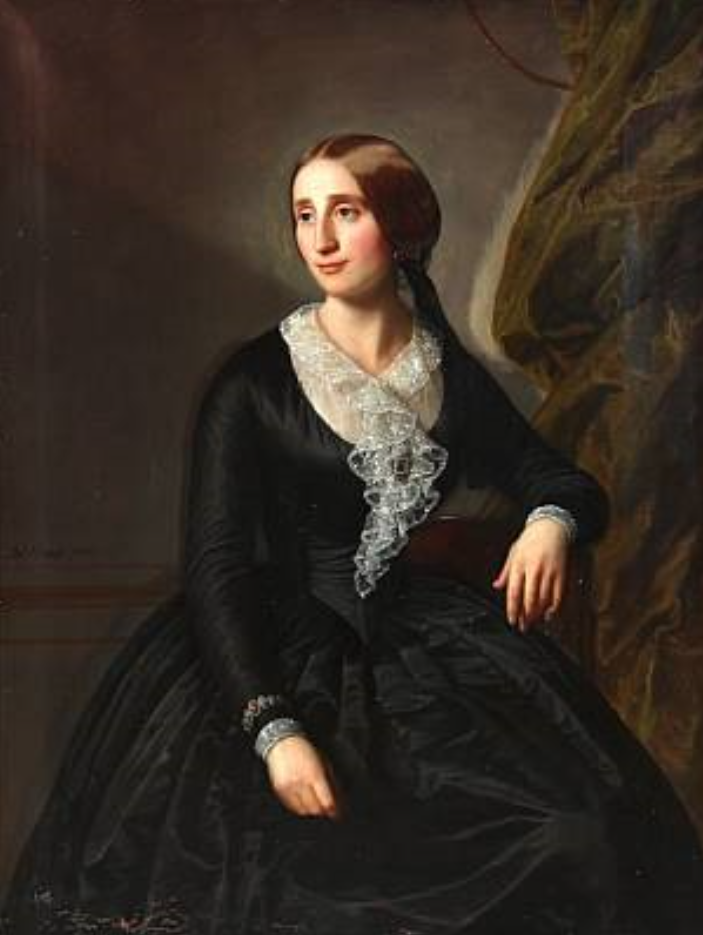
Erhardine Adolphine Hansen.

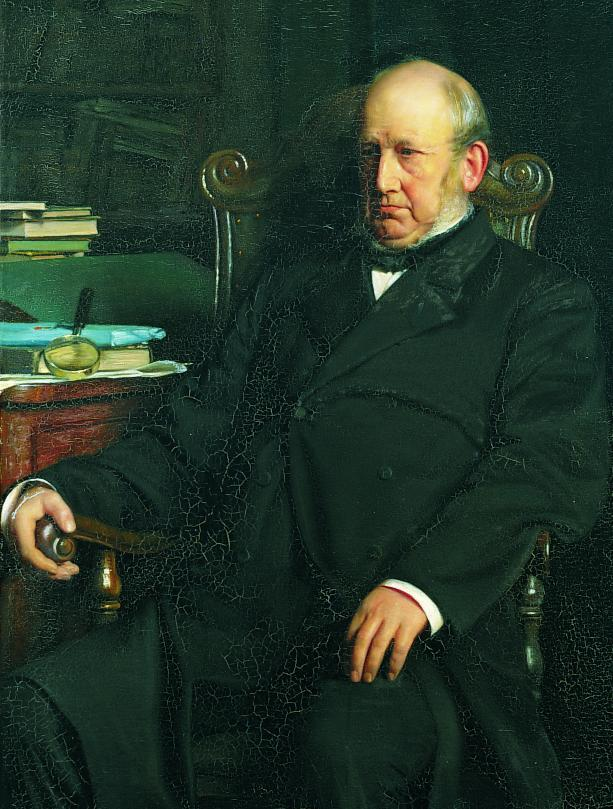
Andreas Frederik Krieger.

=== January–March ===
- 28 January – Joachim Bruun de Neergaard, landowner and politician (born 1806)
- 2 February – Carl Christoffer Georg Andræ, politician (born 1812)

=== April–June ===
- 13 April – Charles Abrahams, architect (born 1838)
- 24 April – Lauritz Rasmussen, zinc and bronze caster (born 1824)
- 10 June – Erhardine Adolphine Hansen, actress (born 1815)

=== July–September ===
- 14 August – Carl Balsgaard, painter (born 1812)
- 7 September – Israel B. Melchior, photographer (born 1827)
- 13 September – Carl Ludvig Gerlach, composer and opera singer (born 1832)
- 19 September – Anker Heegaard, businessman (born 1815)
- 27 September – Andreas Frederik Krieger, politician (born 1817)

=== October–December ===
  - Hinrich Johannes Rink, geologist (born 1819)
  - Philip Heyman, businessman (born 1837)
- 21 December – Isaac Wilhelm Tegner, lithographer (born 1815)
