= 1883 in Denmark =

- Decades: 1860s; 1870s; 1880s; 1890s; 1900s
- See also: Other events of 1883; List of years in Denmark

Events from the year 1883 in Denmark.

== Incumbents ==
- Monarch — Christian IX
- Prime minister — J. B. S. Estrup

== Events ==
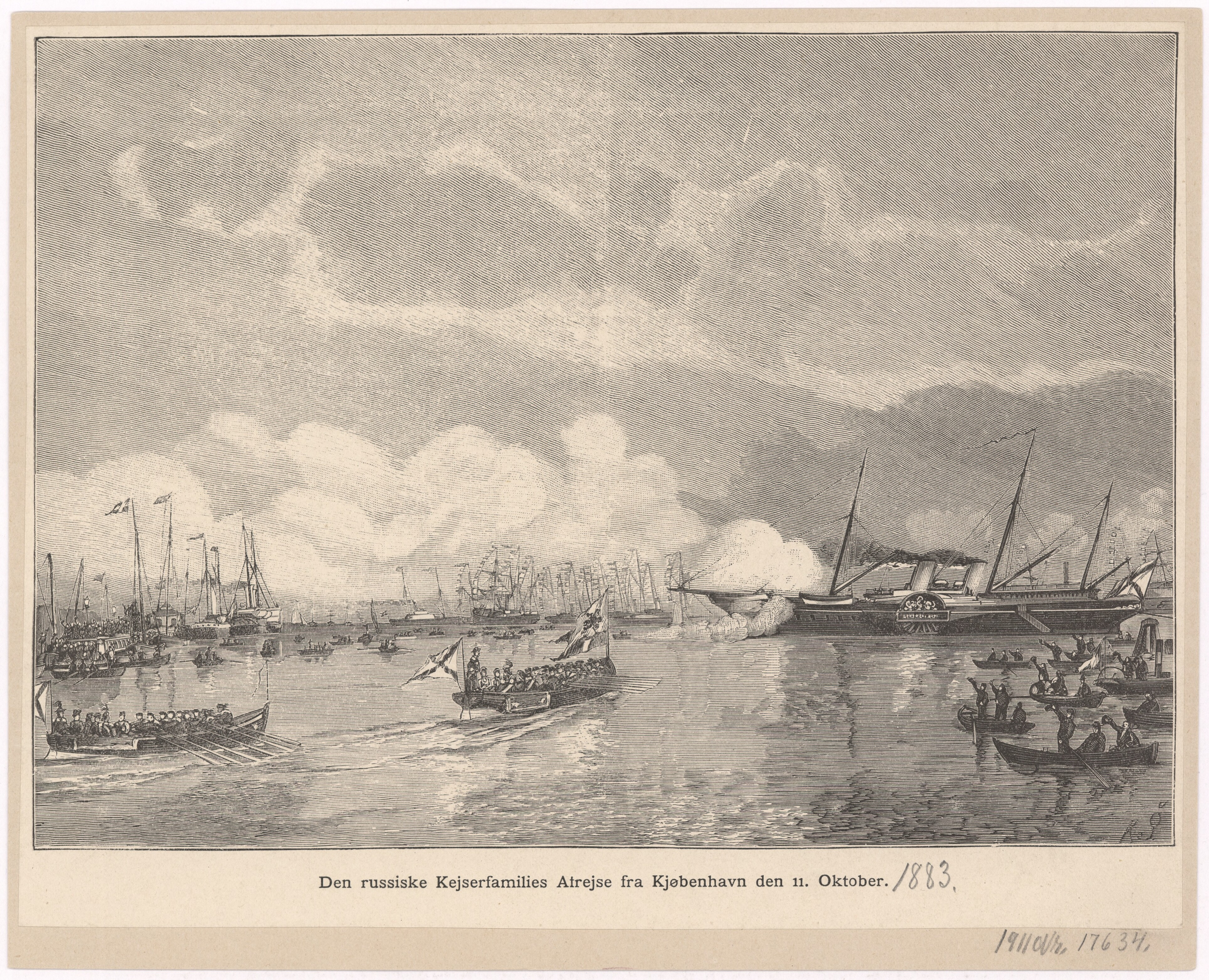
11 Pctpber_ The Russian tsar family departs from Copenhagen.

;July

- 3 July – The temperate reaches 35.0 °C at Flintholm Manor, which was then the highest temerature ever recorded in Denmark.

October

- 11 October – The Russian tsar family departs from Copenhagen.

December

- 1 December – The first Great Belt ferries, H/F Korsør and H/F Nyborg, goes into service.

=== Undated ===
- Emil Christian Hansen from Carlsberg develops a method for propagating pure yeast which revolutionises the brewing industry. The yeast is named Saccharomyces Carlsbergensis after the brewery.
- Harboe's Brewery is founded in Skælskør.
- The Slagelse Hoard is discovered in Slagelse.

== Culture ==
=== Art ===
- The Thorvaldsen Exhibition Medal is awarded to Thorvald Niss for Winter Scene from Folehaven and Bertha Wegmann for Portrait of the Artist's Sister.

=== Music ===
- Danish composer Johan Svendsen is appointed principal conductor of Copenhagen's Royal Theatre Orchestra, despite his lack of experience in the role.
  - Danish composer Carl Nielsen, aged 18, visits Copenhagen where he is introduced to Niels Gade. Gade suggests he enrol at the Royal Danish Academy of Music.

== Births ==
=== January–March ===
- 3 February – Aksel Jørgensen, painter and wood engraver (d. 1957)
- 11 February – Paul von Klenau, composer and conductor (d. 1946)
- 22 February – Olga Svendsen, actor (died 1942)
- 26 March – Poul Reumert, actor /died 1968)

=== April–June ===
- 8 April – Thorvald Andersen, architect /died 1935)
- 23 April – Clara Pontoppidan, actress (died 1975)
- 23 May – Vilhelm Hvalsøe, architect (died 1958)

=== July–September ===
- 19 August
  - Emilius Bangert, composer and organist (d. 1962)
  - Helga Ancher, painter (died 1064)
- 23 August – [[]], composer (died 1959)
- 25 September – Einar Middelboe, footballer (died 1968)

=== October–December ===
- 3 October – Harry August Jansen, entertainer/magician (died 1955 in the United States)
- 8 October – Otto Andrup, museum director (d. 1953)
- 25 October – Ulrik Birch, aviator (died 1913)
- 7 November – Johannes Pedersen, scholar (died 1977)
- 2 December – Pola Gauguin, painter and writer (died 1961)

== Deaths ==
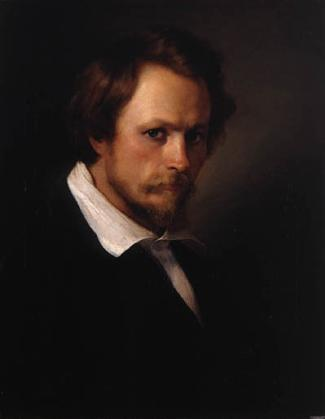
Jens Adolf Jerichau.

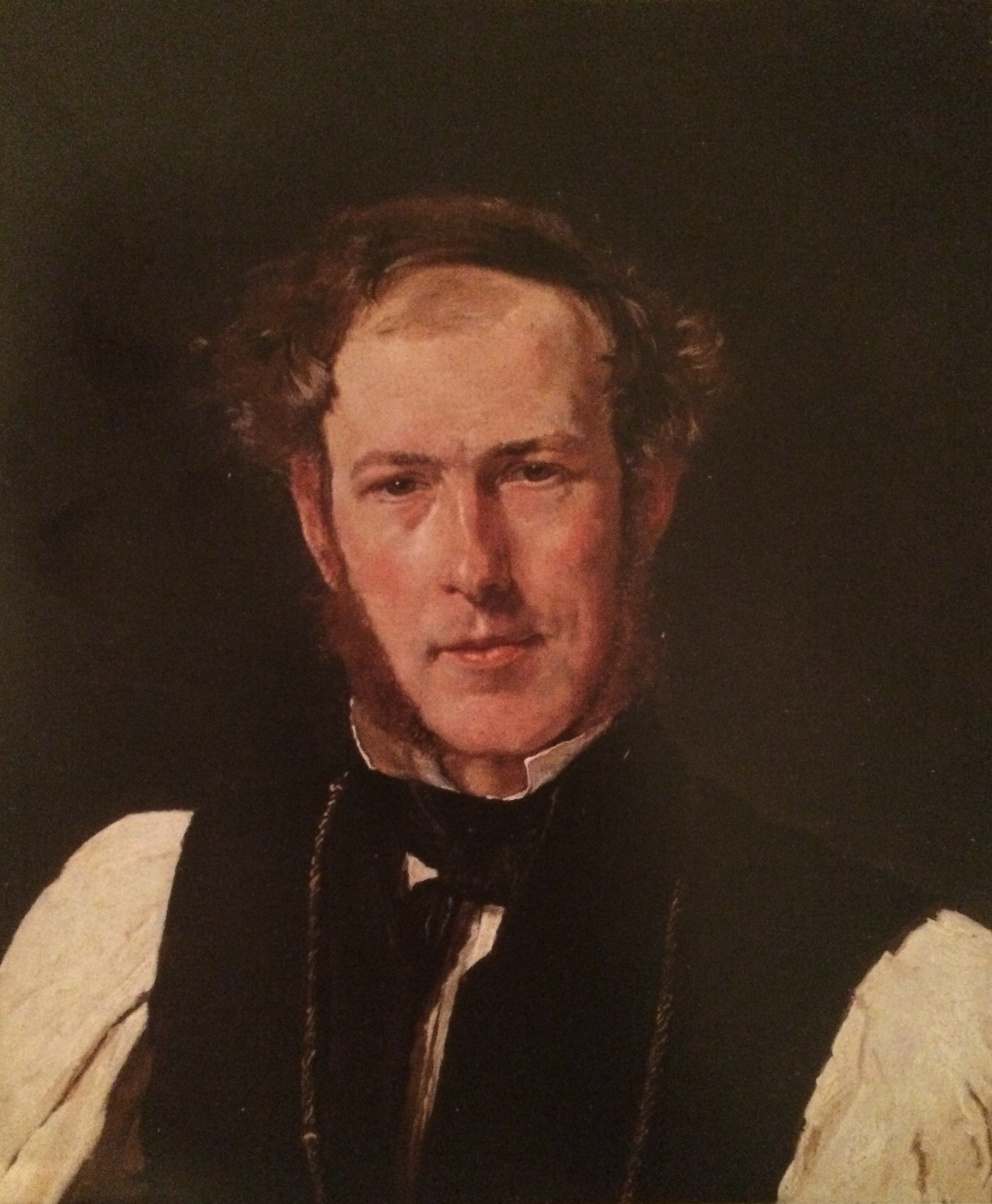
Frederik Christopher Krohn.

=== April–June ===
- 2 May
  - Christian Hansen, architect (b. 1803)
  - Steen Andersen Bille, naval officer (born 1797)
- 4 May — Thorald Brendstrup, painter (b. 1812)

=== July–September ===
- 14 July – Svend Grundtvig, literary historian and ethnologist (born 1824)
- 25 July — Jens Adolf Jerichau, painter (b. 1816)
- 2 September – Frederik Storch, painter (born 1805)
- 13 September – Frederik Christopher Krohn, medallist and sculptor (born 1806)

=== October–December ===
- 8 October – Hans Nielsen Jeppesen, businessman (born 1815)
- 24 October – Frederik Adolph de Roepstorff, philologist (born 1842 at sea)
- 30 November – Adda Ravnkilde, writer (born 1862)
- 24 December – Camillus Nyrop, instrument maker (born 1811)
