= 1812 in Denmark =

- Decades: 1790s; 1800s; 1810s; 1820s; 1830s
- See also: Other events of 1812; List of years in Denmark

Events from the year 1812 in Denmark.

== Incumbents ==
- Monarch – Frederick VI
- Prime minister – Frederik Moltke

== Events ==
=== Undated ===
- Andreas Marschall establishes a piano factory in Copenhagen.

== Births ==
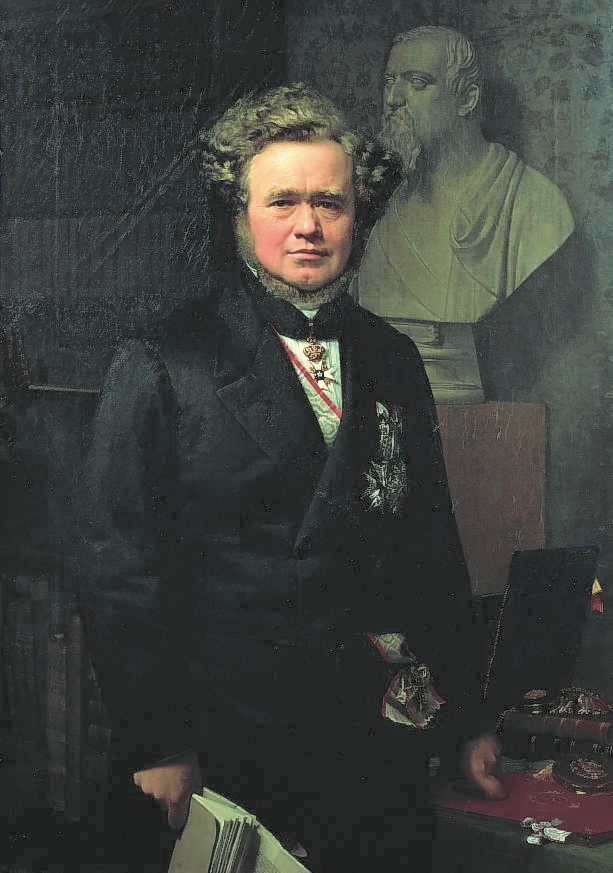
Carl Christian Hall.

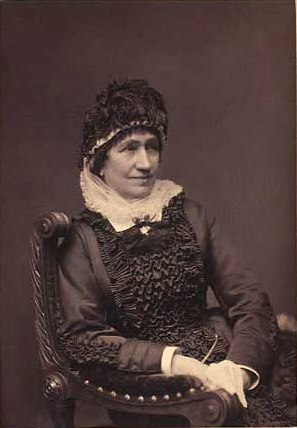
Johanne Luise Heiberg.

=== January–March ===
- 25 February – Carl Christian Hall, politician, Danish prime minister (died 1888)
- 8 March – Louis Gurlitt, painter (died 1897)
- 24 March – Carl Dahl, painter (died 1865)

=== April–June ===
- 25 May – Thorald Brendstrup, painter (died 1883)

=== July–September ===
- 29 August – Adolph Peter Adler, theologian (died 1869)

=== October–December ===
- 14 October – Carl Christoffer Georg Andræ, mathematician and politician (died 1893)
- 22 November – Johanne Luise Heiberg, actress (died 1890)
- 17 December – Vilhelm Petersen, painter (born 1812)
- 24 December – Carl Balsgaard, painter (died 1893)

== Deaths ==
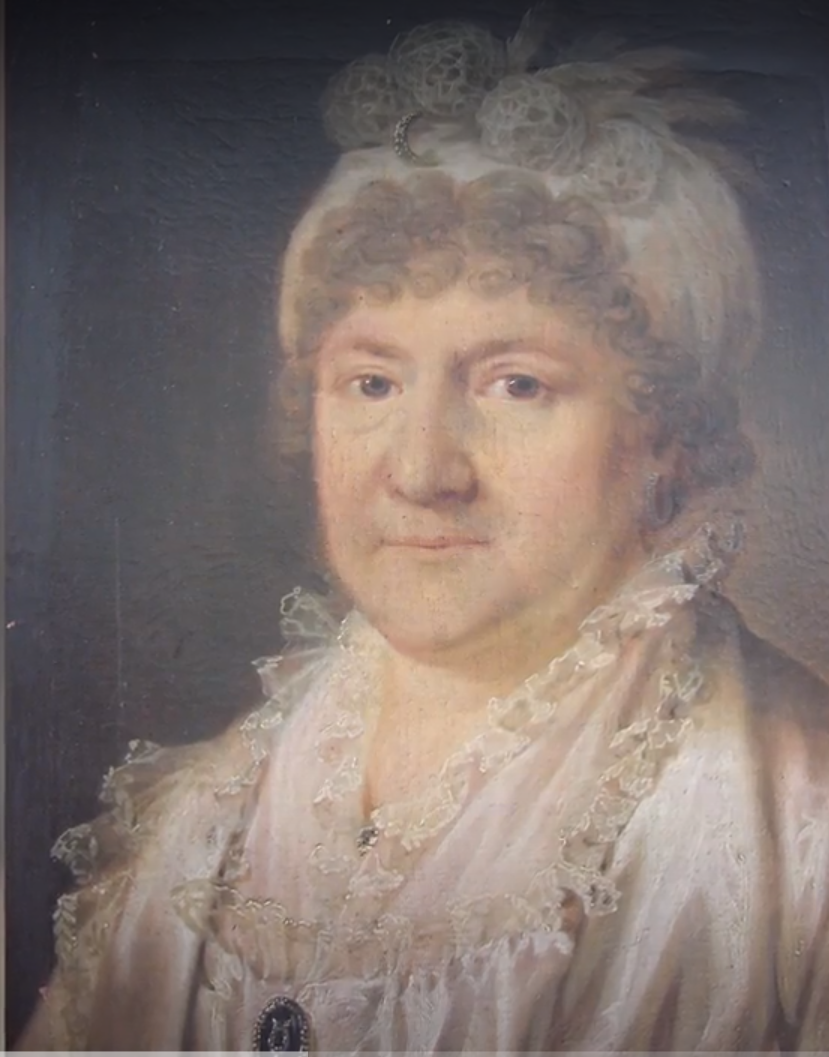
Martha Wærn.

- 16 January – Pierre Peschier, merchant (born 1739)
- 27 January – Martha Wærn, philanthropist (born 1741)
- 7 March – Thomas Ter-Borch, businessman (born 1762)
- 21 September – Poul Skibsted, lawyer (born 1753)
- 26 October – Hans Peter Holm, naval officer (born 1772)
