= 1965 in Denmark =

- Decades: 1940s; 1950s; 1960s; 1970s; 1980s
- See also: Other events of 1965; List of years in Denmark

Events from the year 1965 in Denmark.

== Incumbents ==
- Monarch – Frederik IX
- Prime minister – Jens Otto Krag

== Births ==
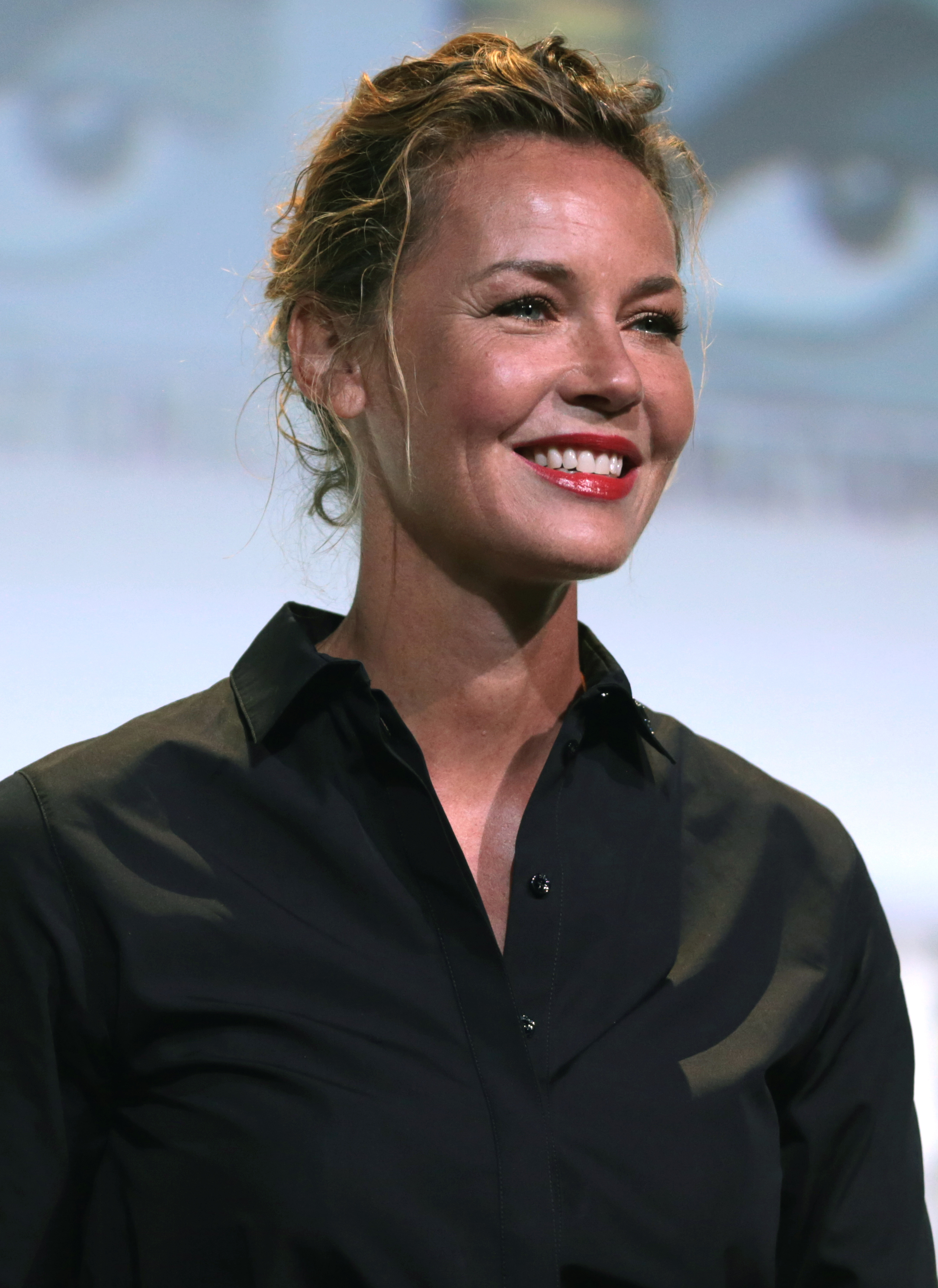
Connie Nielsen.

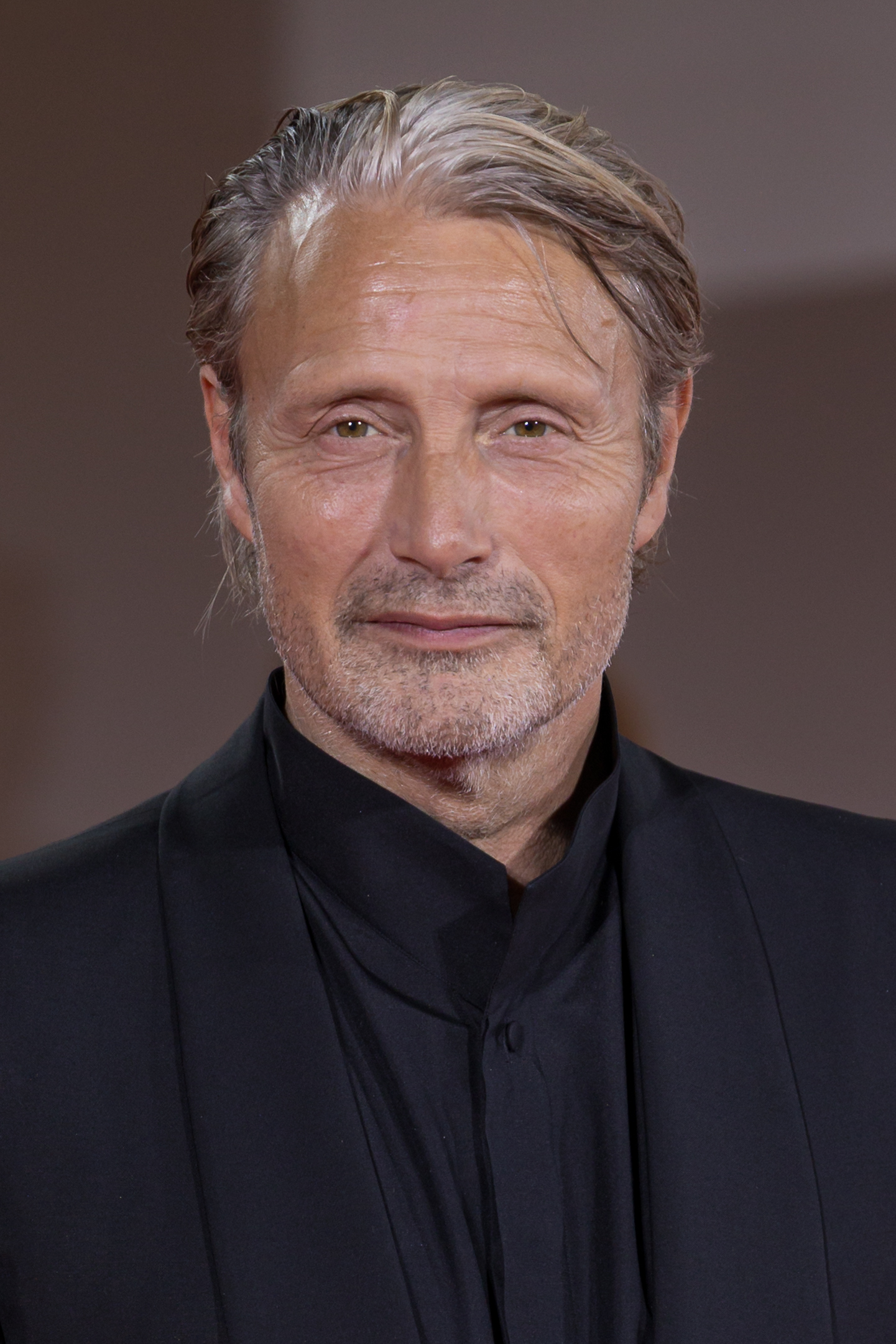
Mads Mikkelsen.

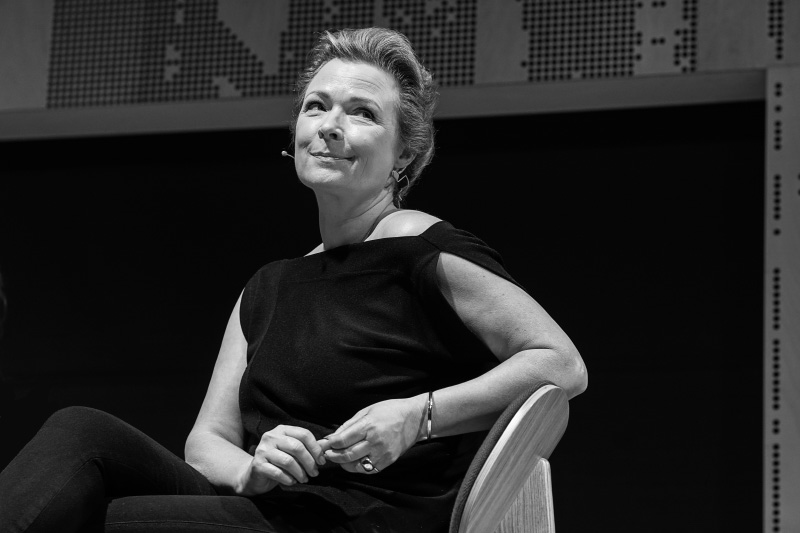
Helle Helle.

=== January–March ===
- 3 January – Jens Albinus, actor
- 6 January – Bjørn Lomborg, author
- 19 February – Jan E. Jørgensen, politician
- 31 January – Christian Frederiksen, canoer
- 11 February – Michael Mio Nielsen, footballer
- 29 March – Henrik Nielsen, footballer

=== April–June ===
- 1 April – Brian Nielsen, boxer
- 12 April – Kim Bodnia, actor
- 20 April – Rolf Sørensen, cyclist
- 23 April – Lasse Spang Olsen, filmmaker
- 12 May – Renée Simonsen, former model
- 1 June – Alexander Kølpin, hotel owner and former ballet dancer

=== July–September ===
- 3 July – Connie Nielsen, actress
- 20 September – Poul-Erik Høyer Larsen, badminton player and president of the World Vadminton Federation
- 23 September – Master Fatman, media personality (1965–2019)
- 26 September – Lene Espersen, politician

=== October–December ===
- 16 October – Ann Eleonora Jørgensen, actress
- 30 October – Julian LeFay, video game designer (d. 2025)
- 22 November – Mads Mikkelsen, actor
- 14 December – Helle Helle, author

== Deaths ==
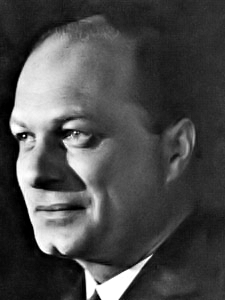
Kay Fisker.

=== January–March ===
- 6 January – Søren Marinus Jensenm wrestler (born 1879)
- 31 January – Cay Lembcke, co-founder of the Danish Boy Schots movement (died 1885
- 2 February – Axel Aabrink, painter (born 1887)
- 5 March – Frits Schlegel, architect (died 1896)
- 23 March – Viggo Jarl, sculptor (born 1879)

=== April–June ===
- 3 April – Else Jacobsen, swimmer (born 1911)
- 12 June – Arnold Peter Møller, shipping magnate, founder of A. P. Moller-Maersk (born 1876)
- 21 June – Kay Fisker, architect (born 1893)

=== July–September ===
- 6 August – Aksel Sandemose, author (born 1899)

=== October–December ===
- 20 December – Olga Aae, Danish artist
- 23 December – Ivan Joseph Martin Osiier, Olympic athlete (born 1888)

== See also ==
- 1965 in Danish television
