= 1953 in Denmark =

- Decades: 1930s; 1940s; 1950s; 1960s; 1970s
- See also: Other events of 1953; List of years in Denmark

Events from the year 1953 in Denmark.

== Incumbents ==
- Monarch – Frederik IX
- Prime minister – Erik Eriksen (until 30 September), Hans Hedtoft

== Events ==
In 1953 the Danish constitution was amended, allowing for female succession to the throne. King Frederik IX's eldest daughter (and child) Princess Margrethe, replaced her uncle Prince Knud as heir-presumptive.

== Sports ==
=== Badminton ===
- 22 March – Marie U. Nylen wins gold in Women's Singles at the All England Badminton Championships

=== Cycling ===
- Date unknown – Lucien Gillen (LUX) and Ferdinando Terruzzi (ITA) win the Six Days of Copenhagen six-day track cycling race.

=== Football ===
- 20 January – Boldklubben Avarta is founded.

== Births ==
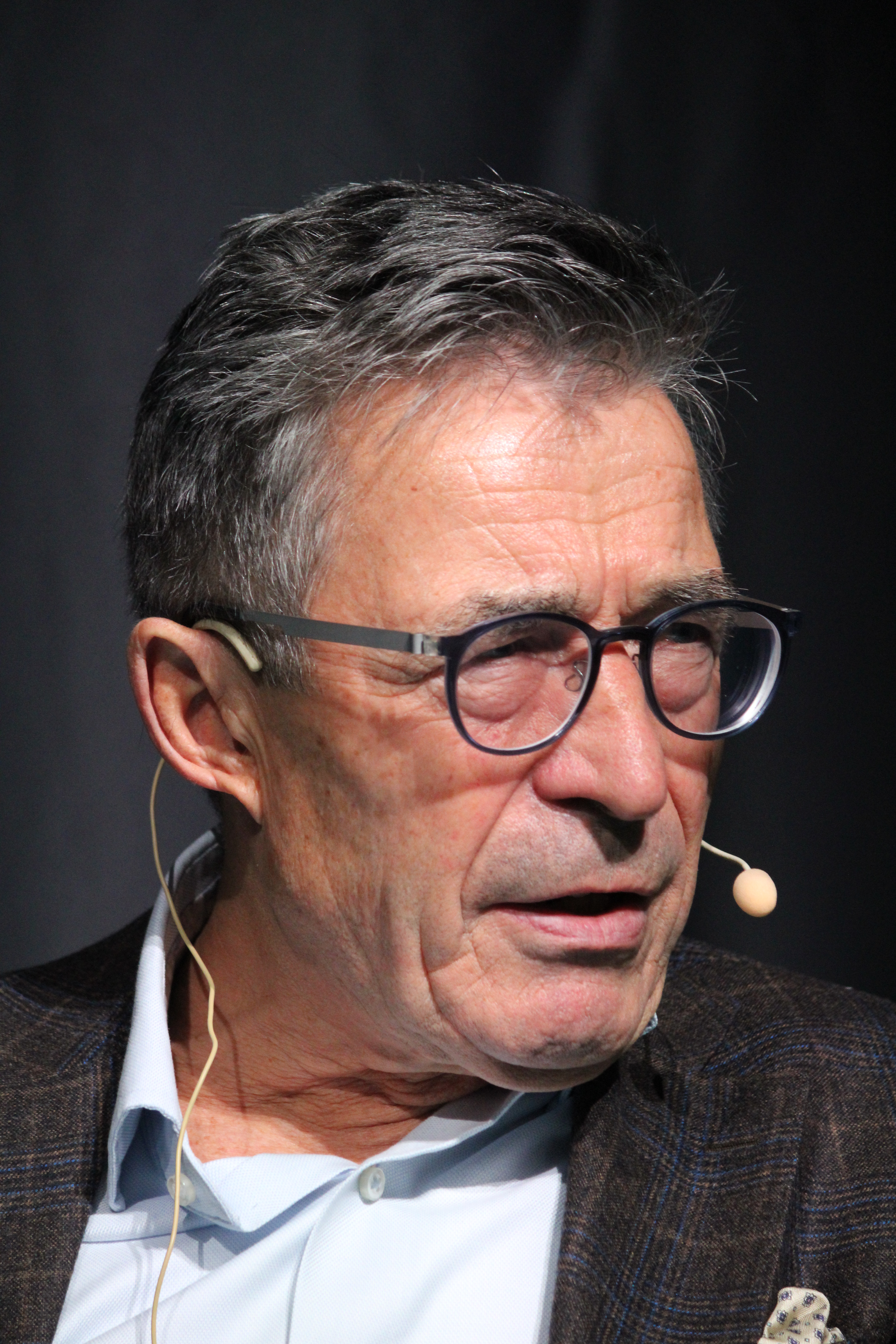
Anders Fogh Rasmussen.

=== January–March ===
- 26 January – Anders Fogh Rasmussen, politician, Prime Minister of Denmark 2001–09, Secretary General of NATO 2009–14
- 29 January – David Gress, historian
- 29 March – Jørgen Emborg, jazz pianist

=== April–June ===
- 10 April – Søren Busk, footballer
- 15 April – Frank Andersen, ballet dancer, choreographer and ballet master
- 5 May – Lene Køppen, badminton player

=== July–September ===
- 30 July – Anne Linnet, singer, composer، and writer
- 10 September – Michael Schønwandt, conductor
- 11 September – Lars H.U.G., musician and painter

== Deaths ==
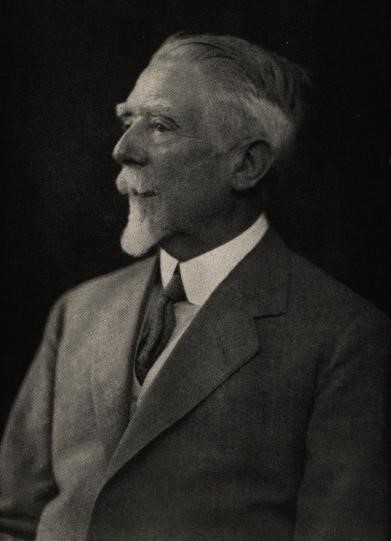
Carl Brummer.

=== January–March ===
- 16 January – Valdemar Henckel, businessman, company founder (born 1877)
- 17 January – Hans Peter Hansen, journalist and politician (born 1872)
- 14 February – Carl Brummer, architect (born 1864)
- 15 February– Karen Poulsen, actress (born 1881)
- 22 February – Arnold Busck, bookseller, company founder (born 1871)
- 16 March – Svend Ranulf, philosopher (died 1894)

=== April–June ===
- 3 April – Vilhelm Andersen, writer and historian (born 1864)
- 30 April – Morten Pedersen Porsild, botanist (born 1872)
- 7 May – Aage Rafn, architect (born 1890)

=== July–September ===
- 22 July – Charlotte Wedell, mathematicians (born 1867)
- 27 July – Jørgen Arenholt, tennis player, competitor at the 1912 Summer Olympics (born 1876)
- 24 August – Otto Andrup, museum director (born 1773)

=== October–December ===
- 25 October – Holger Pedersen, linguist (born 1867)
- 25 November – Anna Bloch, actress (born 1868)
- 27 November – Emil Bønnelycke, poet (born 1893)
