= 1892 in Denmark =

- Decades: 1870s; 1880s; 1890s; 1900s; 1910s
- See also: Other events of 1892; List of years in Denmark

Events from the year 1892 in Denmark.

== Incumbents ==
- Monarch – Christian IX
- Prime minister – J. B. S. Estrup

== Events ==
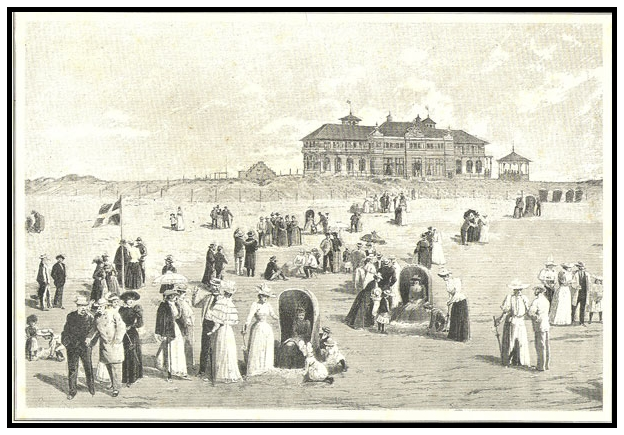
22 June: The inauguration of Fanø Nordsøbad, illustration from Illustreret Tidende

- 20 April – The 1892 Danish Parliamentary Election takes place.
- 22 June – Fanø Nordsøbad is inaugurated on the island of Fanø.
- 4–9 July – The 14th Scandinavian Scientist Conference is held in Copenhagen.

== Culture ==
=== Music ===
- 8 April – Carl Nielsen's String Quartet No. 2 is for the first time performed in public in Copenhagen.

== Births ==
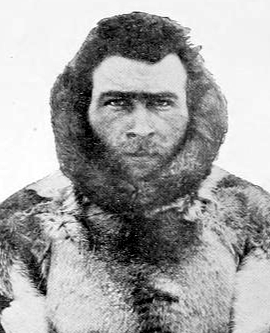
Lauge Koch.

- 17 February – Poul Jørgensen (gymnast), gymnast (died 1973)
- 3 April – Elof Risebye, painter (died 1961)
- 4 April – Charles Christian Lauritsen, Danish-American physicist (died 1968)
- 5 July – Lauge Koch, geologist and Arctic explorer (died 1964)
- 9 August – Thomas Dinesen, Danish-Canadian military officer and recipient of the Victoria Cross (died 1979)
- 29 October – Ernst Hansen, painter (died 1968)

== Deaths ==
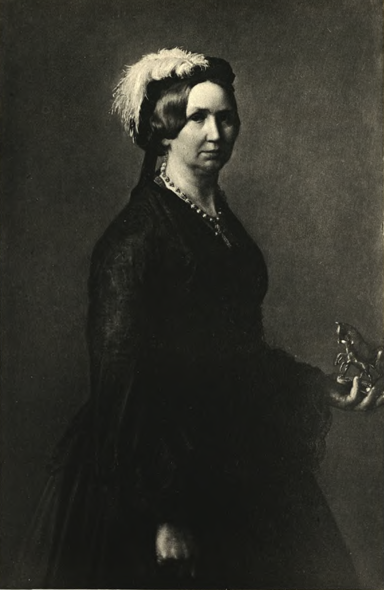
Adelgunde Voigt.

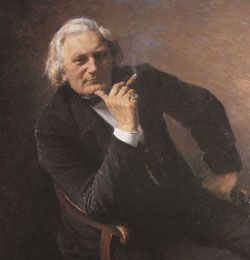
Mads Christian Holm.

=== January–March ===
- 12 January – Heinrich Buntzen, painter (born 1808 in the Holy Roman Empire)
- 10 March – Gottlieb Abrahamson Gedalia, banker (born 1816)

=== April–September ===
- 10 June – Adelgunde Vogt, sculptor (born 1811)
- 6 August – Ernst Immanuel Cohen Brandes, economist, writer, and editor (born 1844)
- 23 September – Mads Christian Holm, shipbuilder and ship-owner (born 1827)

=== October–December ===
- 17 December – Christian Richardt, writer (born 1831)
- 22 December – M Wilhelm Hellesen, industrialist and inventor /born 1836)
