= Tsanev =

Tsanev (Bulgarian: Цанев) is a surname. Notable people with the surname include:

- Nikola Tsanev (1939–2004), Bulgarian footballer
- Stefan Tsanev (born 1936), Bulgarian writer, known for his essays, plays, poems, and historical novels

== See also ==
- Tanev
