= 1965 in Danish television =

This is a list of Danish television related events from 1965.

== Births ==
- 1 June – Camilla Miehe-Renard, TV host
- 23 September – Morten Lindberg, singer, comedian & TV host (died 2019)
- 21 November – Anne-Grethe Bjarup Riis, actress

== See also ==
- 1965 in Denmark
