= D/S Norden =

Danish shipping company

Dampskibsselskabet Norden A/S
- Company type: Publicly traded Aktieselskab
- Traded as: Nasdaq Copenhagen: DNORD
- Industry: Shipping
- Founded: 1871
- Founder: Mads Christian Holm
- Headquarters: Hellerup, Denmark
- Key people: Jan Rindbo(CEO), Klaus Nyborg (Chairman)
- Products: Tankers, dry cargo
- Revenue: US $2.190 billion (2010)
- Operating income: US $222.5 million (2010)
- Net income: US $244.8 million (2010)
- Total assets: US $2.250 billion (end 2010)
- Total equity: US $1.998 billion (end 2010)
- Number of employees: 420 (average, 2010)
- Subsidiaries: Norient Product Pool A/S (With Interorient Navigation Company Ltd.)
- Website: www.norden.com

Dampskibsselskabet Norden A/S (commonly abbreviated D/S Norden or NORDEN) is a Danish shipping company operating in the dry cargo and tanker segment worldwide.

The company headquarters are located in Copenhagen, Denmark and the company is listed on the Copenhagen Stock Exchange.

== History ==
=== Early years ===
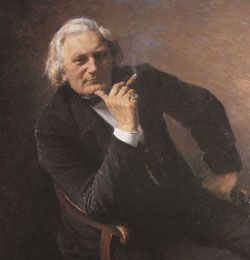
Mads Christian Holm painted by Bertha Wegmann

D/S Norden is one of Denmark's oldest shipping companies, founded in 1871 by Mads Christian Holm. It was named after its first vessel, a Glasgow-built steamship. The company is composed of a dry cargo and a tanker division.

=== Merger with D/S Orient ===
In the years after World War II, D/S Norden entered into an operational collaboration with D/S Orient. In 1946 Orient began to buy shares. The acquisitions continued until Orient in 1955 was granted the status of majority shareholder in D/S Norden. The majority shareholder of D/S Orient was another shipping company, A/S Motortramp, founded on 15 July 1925 by Orient's vice-chairman Arnold Eugen Reimann.

In 1962, Orient's director Aage A. Tonboe became D/S Norden's 4th CEO, and immediately.

=== 21st century ===
In 2002 rival shipping company DS TORM tried to take over NORDEN. Despite resistance from some shareholders, TORM eventually gained control of almost 33% of NORDEN's shares. Although the takeover attempt was unsuccessful, rising stock prices meant that TORM held onto the shares until 2007.

== Operations ==
=== Dry cargo ===
In dry cargo, NORDEN is one of the world’s largest operators of Supramax and Panamax dry cargo vessels and has activities in the Handysize and Post-Panamax vessel types as well.

=== Tanker ===
In tankers, NORDEN is active in the Handysize, MR and LR1 product tanker vessel types

The product tanker activities are operated through the Norient Product Pool, which is jointly owned by NORDEN and Interorient Navigation Company Ltd.

== Fleet ==
NORDEN's fleet is among the most modern and competitive in the industry and the firm operates in total about 300 dry cargo- and tanker vessels (a mix of owned and chartered tonnage).

NORDEN has its head office in Hellerup (north of Copenhagen), Denmark and offices in Singapore, Shanghai, Annapolis, Rio de Janeiro, Dubai, Santiago, Melbourne and Vancouver. At its offices the company has in total about 310 employees and about 640 are employed on the Company’s owned vessels.

NORDEN was a founding member of the Danish Shipowners' Association in 1884 and has been a member ever since. It is also a member of the international organisations; Intertanko (The International Association of Independent Tanker Owners), BIMCO (The Baltic and International Maritime Council) and ICC Denmark (International Chamber of Commerce).
