= Tanev =

Tanev (Bulgarian: Танев) is a Bulgarian surname. Notable people with the surname include:

- Aleksandar Tanev, Bulgarian Army officer
- Anton Yugov (Anton Tanev Yugov), Bulgarian politician
- Badr Salem Nayef (born Petar Tanev), Qatari weightlifter
- Brandon Tanev, Canadian ice hockey player
- Christopher Tanev, Canadian ice hockey player
- Ivan Tanev, Bulgarian former hammer thrower
- Lachezar Tanev, Bulgarian former footballer
- Milcho Tanev, Bulgarian footballer
- Milen Tanev, Bulgarian footballer
- Peter Tanev, Danish/Bulgarian weather presenter
- Todor Tanev, Bulgarian political scientist and sociologist
- Vasil Tanev, Bulgarian tried for complicity in the Reichstag fire in 1933.
