= Balle Hoard =

17th-century hoard discovered in Denmark

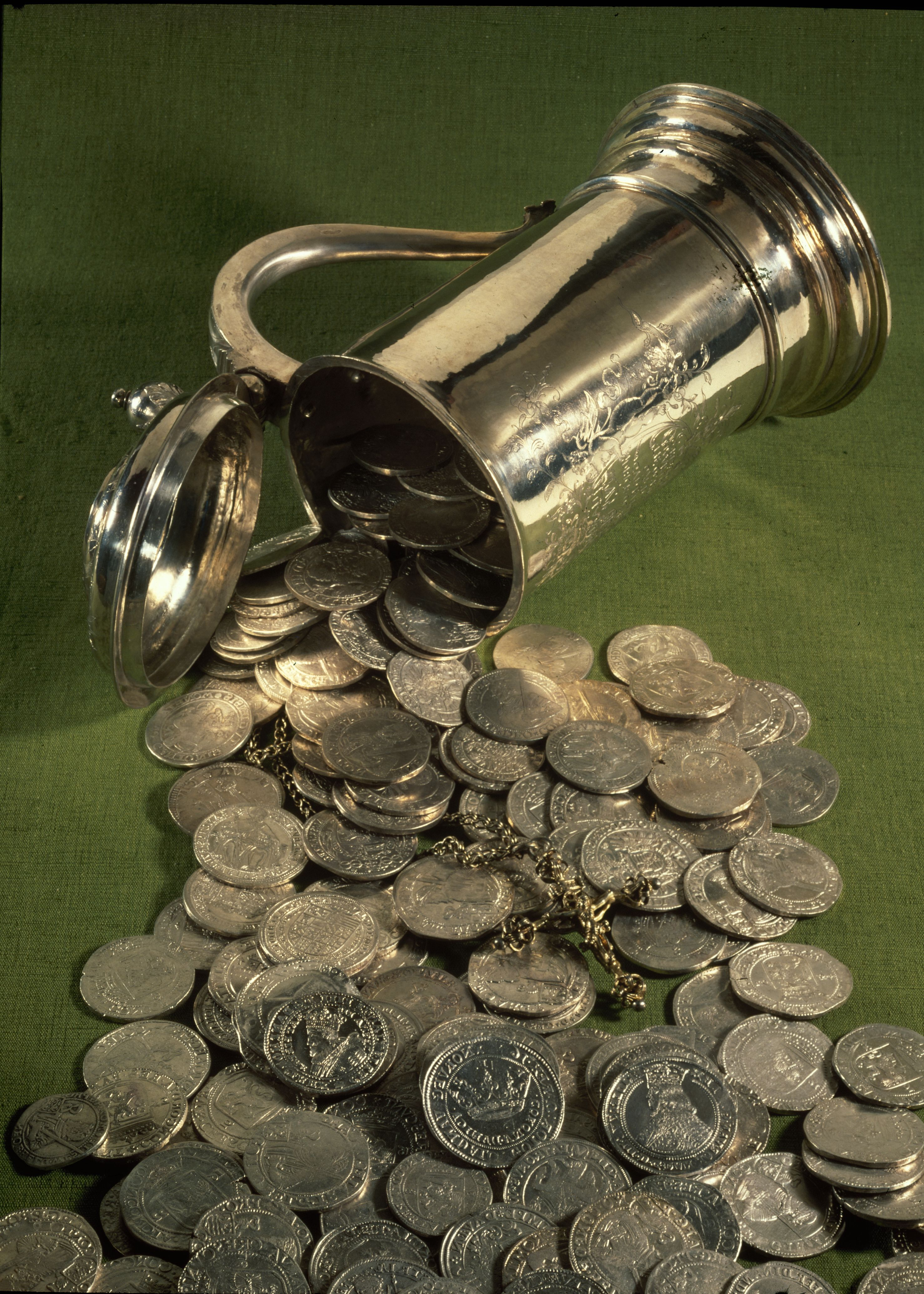
Part of the Balle Hoard.

The Balle Hoard (Danish: Balleskatten), found in Balle, Djursland, is one of the largest 17th-century hoards ever discovered in Denmark. It consists of 12,121 coins, a silver tankard, a smaller silver cup, jewellery and garment components. The youngest of the coins date from 1658, indicating that the hoard was buried during the early stage of the Second Northern War when Charles X Gustav of Sweden's troops ransacked Jutland.

== Discovery ==
The Balle Hoard was discovered on 12 February 1968 when a bulldozer worked on the construction of a new parking lot at Balle Post Office. It was found by the construction workers Marius Jensen (Attrup Kær) and Charles Sørensen (Ny Balle). Agnete Jørgensen from Balle Post Office assisted them contacting Djursland Museum. The excavation work was carried out by Hovesen. Jensen and Sørensen would later receive DKK 12,000 in Danefæ compensation.

== Description ==
The Balle Hoard comprises a total of 12,121 coins. 11,569 of them are Danish coins struck during the reigns of Christian IV and Frederick III.

359 of the foreign coins were thalers (277 one-thalers, 49 half-thalers and 38 quarter-thalers). They mainly entered the country through the cattle trade and Sound Dues where they were subsequently circulated alongside the Danish coins.

The other objects include:

- A large silver tankard
- A smaller silver cup
- Silver spoons
- Jewellery (silver cross, gold ring)
- A silver belt
- Garment components (including two gold buttons)

The Balle Hoard was discovered just 30 cm (12 in) below the surface of the ground. The objects were placed in a wooden trough or tray. Many of the larger silver coins were together with the small silver cup, the silver cross and the silver belt placed inside the tankard.

== See also ==
- Slagelse Hoard
- Kirial Hoard
