= Kirial Hoard =

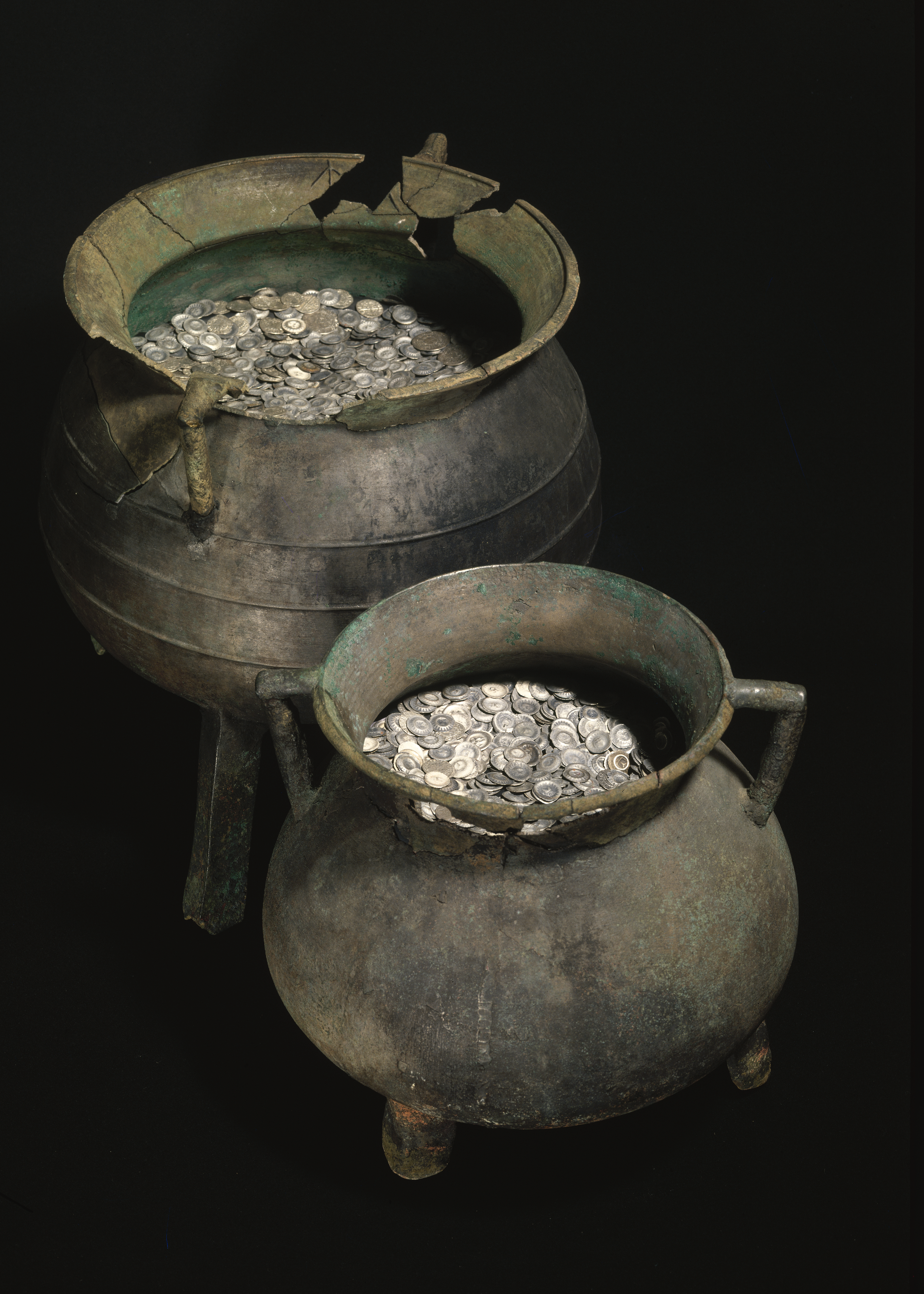
The Kirial Hoard.

The Kirial Hoard (Danish: Kirialfundet or Kirialskatten), found near Kirial, Djursland, is the largest treasure trove ever found in Denmark. It consists of 81,422 silver coins buried in two iron pots and dates from around 1365. Most of the hoard is now on display in the National Museum of Denmark. A minor share of the coins is on display in the local Djursland Museum in Grenå.

== Discovery ==
The Kirial Hoard was discovered in November 1867 when a local farmer was ploughing his fields. His plough hit one of the two iron pots. He found the other pot shortly thereafter. He would later receive DKK 80,000 in Fanefæ compensation.

== Description ==
The Kirial Hoard consists of 81,422 silver coins from the 13th and 14th centuries. None of the coins were minted in Denmark. Most of them are German hollow pfennigs.

== See also ==
- Balle Hoard
