= Michael Mio Nielsen =

Danish footballer (born 1965)

Personal information
- Full name: Michael Elmer Dahl Nielsen
- Date of birth: 11 February 1965 (age 61)
- Place of birth: Denmark
- Position: Defender

Team information
- Current team: Fremad Amager (sporting director)

Senior career*
Years	Team	Apps	(Gls)
1984–1987	Albertslund IF		
1988–1990	BK Frem	60	(8)
1990–1992	Lille		
1992–1993	→ BK Frem (loan)	29	(4)
1993–2001	FC Copenhagen	231	(2)

International career
1993	Denmark	1	(0)

Managerial career
- 2008–2015: FC Copenhagen (youth)
- 2016: BK Frem (caretaker)
- 2017: Fremad Amager (head of youth)
- 2017–: Fremad Amager (sporting director)
- * Club domestic league appearances and goals

Michael Elmer Dahl Nielsen (nicknamed Mio; born 11 February 1965) is a Danish former professional footballer who played as a defender. He works for Fremad Amager as the person responsible for the youth players and talents. He is most famous for playing 231 league matches for F.C. Copenhagen. He also made one appearance for the Denmark national team, against the United States in 1993.

After his retirement as a player he was team head in the club, and general manager for F.C. Copenhagen School of Excellence.

In October 2016 he became caretaker manager of Boldklubben Frem together with René Henriksen.

== Honours ==
FC Copenhagen

- Danish Superliga: 2000-01
- Danish Cup: 1994-95, 1996–97
- Danish Super Cup: 1995, 2001
