= Mads Christian Holm =

Danish shipbuilder and ship-owner

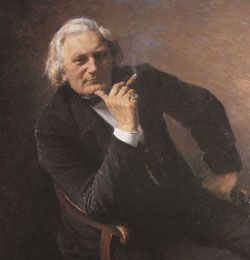
- M. C. Holm painted by Bertha Wegmann
- Born: 19 October 1827; Nykøbing Mors, Denmark
- Died: 23 September 1892 (aged 64); Copenhagen, Denmark
- Occupations: Shipbuilder and ship-owner

Mads Christian Holm (19 October 1827 - 23 September 1892) was a Danish shipbuilder and ship-owner. He founded the shipping company D/S Norden in Copenhagen in 1861 and Helsingør Dockyard in Helsingør in 1882. He is also remembered for his charitable donations to the church, an orphanage and a school in his home town Nykøbing Mors.

== Early life and education ==
Holm was born in Nykøbing Mors, the illegitimate son of Maren Nielsdatter (1794–1854). His father is in the church records listed as servant Esper (Esben) Nielsen (1795–1880) but may have been a district bailiff (by- og hjerredsfoged) and justice councilor named Rummelhoff. Either way. Esper Nielsen ended up marrying a well-to-do widow of a farmer, leaving Maren Nielsdatter and her son in very poor circumstances. Mads Christian frequently had to go out begging to get food on the table. He assumed the surname Holm after his mother married ship carpenter Lars Christensen Holm (1812–53) in 1838. After completing an apprenticeship as a ship carpenter in Thisted, following in his step father's footsteps, he worked on shipwarfs in Aalborg and Helsingør.

== Years abroad ==
Holm enrolled on a barque bound for Boston. He then continued to San Francisco before, in 1854, founding a shipyard in Oakland, California, which specialized in revamping abandoned ships. He left it in the trust of his partner to return to Europe about one year later. His intention at that point was to return to America after visiting the exposition Universelle in Paris and his home country.

== Career in Denmark ==
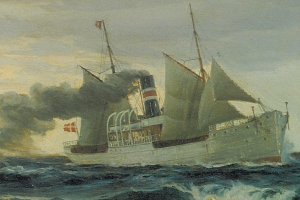
D/S Norden's first ship, Norden

Back in Denmark, Holm initially visited his home town Nykøbing Mors. After a while he ended up leasing a shipyard in Åbenrå in a business partnership with sea captain Bot Bendixen (1792–1861).

In 1862 he moved to Copenhagen to study business at the Business College. In January 1871, he successfully invited interested investors to participate in a share subscription for a steam ship for tramp service, leading to the foundation of D/S Norden on 11 February 1871. Norden, an ironbuilt screw steamer with a load capacity of one thousand tons deadweight, was launched from Aitken & Mansel at Glasgow in February 1872. Holm headed the company until his death in 1892 and its fleet had by then grown to five ships.

He established Helsingør Jernskibs- og Maskinbyggeri in Helsingør in 1882. Carl Frederik Tietgen had tried to obstruct the plans.

== Personal life and legacy ==
Holm had a relationship to a girl named Arlette Lund during his years in Aalborg. In 1851 it resulted in a son, Ferdinand Jørgen Peter Holm, but Arlette Lund's parents, who were wealthy restaurateurs, would not let their daughter marry him. Holm later wrote her many letters but she ended up marrying another man. After his return from America, in 1861, Holm married Emilie Bendixen (30 May 183? - 27 August 1914), a daughter of captain Boy Bendixen, his collaborator in Åbenrå. They lived in Nyhavn after moving to Copenhagen.

He made several large donations to the church, a children's asylum and a new school in Nykøbing Mors. The school is still named M. C. Holms Skole ("M. C. Holm's School") after him. The local Freemasons Lodge is also named Lodge No. 67 "M. C. Holm" after him.

Holm died on 23 September 1892 from appendicitis. He is buried in Nykøbing Mors Cemetery. Peter de Nelly Brown took over the management of the company after Holm's death. The company's next new ship was named M.C. Holm in 1894.

Helsingør Jernskibs- og Maskinbyggeri closed in 1983. The buildings were repurposed into a cultural centre named Kulturværftet, which opened in 2010.

In 2023, the musical Horisonten opened at Kulturværftet. The musical was written by Anna Karlin and Albert Mikkelsen and centered around the opening of Helsingør Jernskibs- og Maskinbyggeri, Holm's relationship with Arlette and his marriage to Emilie, and Ferdinand's attempt to reunite with his father. Holm was portrayed by Magnus Hauge Nielsen.
