= Olga Aae =

Danish artist

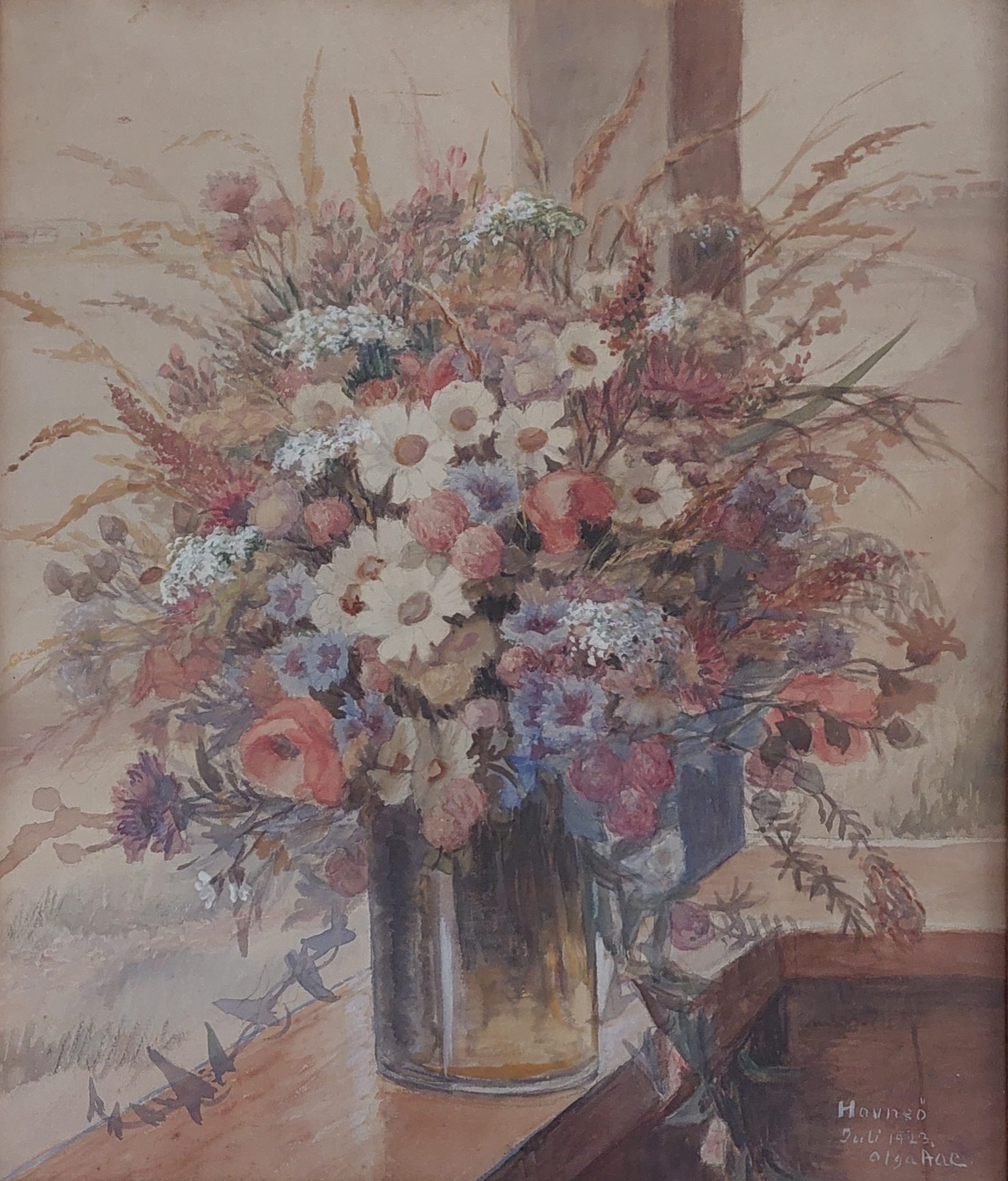
A still life painting of a bunch of Danish Wild Flowers by Olga Aae painted in July 1923

Olga Harriet Aae (born Olga Harriet Rasmussen; 20 August 1877 – 20 December 1965) was a Danish artist.

She was born in Ordrup. Her parents were Carl Christian Rasmussen, a wholesaler, and Anna Nicoline Schou.

== Art career ==
From 1901 to 1905 she studied under Harald Foss in Copenhagen. In the summer, she painted under Foss in the open air. From 1920 to 1923, she worked as a painter at the Royal Porcelain Factory in Copenhagen.

She had personal exhibitions in Århus, Horsens, Odense and Copenhagen. In 1942, her works were in Johan Hansen's watercolor auction. She painted flowers and landscapes, mainly watercolors. Through Harald Foss, she was influenced by Vilhelm Kyhn and PC Skovgaard.

Among her works are four watercolor landscapes from Italy (formerly in the Johan Hansen collection) and watercolors (in the Museum of Medical History in Copenhagen).

== Personal life ==
On 15 April 1905, she married painter Arvid Aae in Frederiksberg.

She died on 20 December 1965.
