= Svend Ranulf =

Danish sociologist and philosopher (1894–1953)

Svend Ranulf (26 March 1894 in Odense - 16 March 1953 in Aarhus) was a Danish philosopher and sociologist. From 1939 until his death he was professor of philosophy at the University of Aarhus, where he came into conflict with Theodor Geiger, who also taught in Aarhus, in the so-called "Danish positivism dispute".

== Career ==
Ranulf trained as a teacher in Odense until 1916 and then turned to philosophy. In 1922 he passed his master's degree and in 1924 he received his doctorate. During study trips to Leipzig and Paris his interest in sociology arose, which never waned, and he saw himself as a student of Émile Durkheim. In 1938 he applied unsuccessfully for the first Danish professorship for sociology in Aarhus, which was then awarded to Theodor Geiger. Ranulf had been in a tense competitive relationship with Geiger since the latter's emigration in 1933 and jealously watched how Geiger gained recognition in the still poorly structured Danish social sciences, first in Copenhagen and then in Aarhus. Ranulf did not accept the appointment of Geiger, who was much better qualified in the field, to the newly created chair - even when he was appointed to a professorship for philosophy in Aarhus in 1939. After Geiger returned from Sweden (he had to leave Denmark during the German occupation of the country), Ranulf involved him in the so-called "Danish positivism dispute." In the process, he revealed significant gaps in his academic knowledge that were detrimental to his reputation. His second attempt to become a professor of sociology at the University of Copenhagen also failed in 1949.

In his 1946 book on methods (Socialvidenskabelig metodelære), Ranulf criticized the vagueness and untestability of German sociology, which was oriented towards the humanities. Specifically, Ranulf took issue with the understanding of methods in Geiger's Danish-language overview work Sociologi. Grundrids og Hovedproblemer from 1939. He also considered Geiger's earlier works, in particular his contribution to Vierkandt's Dictionary of Sociology from 1931, to be the epitome of problematic methodology. He found that the interpretative sociology of the Weimar Republic, especially Geiger's writings, was too imprecise and demanded empirical precision. Ranulf also accused Geiger of having opened the door to National Socialist thinking with his sociology - albeit unintentionally. As early as 1939, Ranulf had also counted Ferdinand Tönnies among the "scientific forerunners" of fascism.

Geiger, who had lost his professorship in Braunschweig in 1933 for "national unreliability", saw the accusations as malicious insinuations and blatant distortions of his understanding of science and as damage to his reputation in the period immediately after the end of the Second World War, when the harassment and atrocities of Nazi barbarism in occupied Denmark were still fresh in memory. He responded with the polemic "Ranulf contra Geiger. An attack and an offensive defense", written in just a few days. In it he stated that Ranulf used an outdated understanding of methods that did not go back directly to Durkheim, but to the simplified version of his student François Simiand, who wanted to seamlessly transfer the research methods of the natural sciences to the social sciences. Ranulf did not address the fact that this put him in opposition to Max Weber, whom he admired. In his reply, Geiger criticized Ranulf's vague terminology and theoretical conception, in which the importance of research methodology was greatly overestimated. Geiger pointed out that no methodological approach, no matter how sophisticated, could replace one's own reflection on the context of the problem.

After reading Geiger's polemic, Ranulf recognized in a letter that "we are actually less at odds than I had thought," but continued his attacks nonetheless. The conflict only ended with Geiger's death in 1952.

Looking back after the deaths of the two opponents, René König considered the affinity claimed by Ranulf between phenomenology and National Socialism to be not unreasonable and called Ranulf an "extremely original Danish sociologist" and a "very astute methodological thinker."
