= 1968 in Danish television =

This is a list of Danish television related events from 1968.

== Births ==
- 16 May – Sidsel Agensø, actress & TV host
- 1 July – Gry de la Cour, TV host
- 30 July – Sofie Gråbøl, actress.
