= Isaac Wilhelm Tegner =

Isac Wilhelm Lauritzen
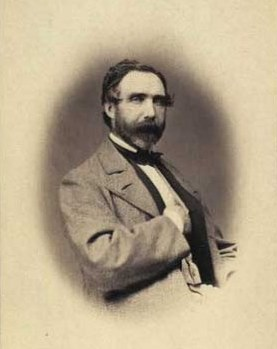
- Portrait of Tegner by N. Willumsen, 1868.
- Born: 13 June 1815; Helsingør, Denmark
- Died: 21 December 1893 (aged 78); Copenhagen, Denmark
- Known for: Portrait lithography

Isaac Wilhelm Tegner (23 June 1815 - 21 December 1893) was a Danish lithographer who was a co-founder of I.W. Tegner & Kittendorff.

== Early life and education ==
Tegner was born in Helsingør, the son of master carpenter and boatbuilder Friderich Christian Tegner (1770–1837) and Inger Marie Poulsen (1780–1835). His father was a captain in Helsingør Fire Corps. Tegner began his education as an apprentice painter and became a journeyman in 1834. Already during his apprenticeship he began attending classes at the Royal Danish Academy of Fine Arts and was admitted to the model class. However, he soon moved on to learn lithography in Carl Henckel's workshop.

== Career ==
In 1838, he began working for Emil Bærentzen's institute, the most well-known company in the industry at the time. Together with two colleagues, Adolph Kittendorff and Karl Muller, he won 2,000 Danish rigsdaler in the lottery. They intended to invest the money in setting up their own company and thought of buying the Berlin Brothers' lithographic institute (founded 1840). However, Muller's death and the outbreak of the First Schleswig War delayed their plans. In 1836, Tegner partnered with a brother as Chr. And I. Tegner's Stentrykkeri. In 1840, he left it to start I.W. Tegner & Kittendorff. While Kittendorff mainly devoted himself to reproducing artistic works, Tegner's specialty was portrait lithography. With the support of the Reiersen Foundation, he had sought further education in Berlin, Dresden and Paris, and his ability to make a likeness, his careful if somewhat dry execution made his works very popular. However, portrait lithography died out as photography improved and became more available. However, the company continued until Tegner's death.

== Personal life ==
Tegner married on 4 November 1848 in Trinitatis Church to Ane Emilie Hansen (1825–1862), daughter of gardener Hans Christian Hansen (1786–1827) and Gertrud Christine Lochte (1792–1882). She died at Jtske Asyl in 1862. He married secondly on 31 October 1863 in the Garrison Church to Athalia Frederikke Henriette Thaae (1832–1888), widow of the luithographer Andreas Christoffer Møller Hansen (1823– 62). Her parents were Icelandic merchant David Christian Frederik Thaae (1802–71) and Christine Marie Biermann (1802–80). He died on 21December 1893and is buried at Solbjerg Cemetery. He was survived by three sons from his first marriage and two sons and a daughter from his second marriage. His third-eldest son Hans Tegner would become an illustrator and porcelain painter.

== Legacy ==
Tegner is probably the Danish lithographer who has executed the most portraits; The Royal Danish Library's records show that in the years 1851–91 approx. 1,200 portraits from the company Tegner & Kittendorff. Some of his works were based on oil paintings. This was for instance the case with his portraits of Bertel Thorvaldsen (painting by Horace Vernet, Johanne Louise Heiberg (painting by Wilhelm Marstrand) and Peter Tordenskiold (painting by Balthasar Denner). Other works, such as his portraits of Bjørnson and Frithjof Nansen, Other works were created after live models.
