= Otto Andrup =

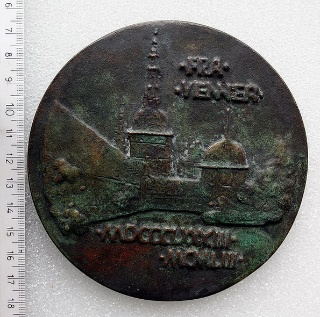
Otto Andrup commemorative medal.

Otto Andrup, Henrik Otto Ludvig Lauritz Andrup (8 October 1883 - 24 August 1953) was a Danish literary historian and cultural administrator. He served as director of the Museum of National History at Frederiksborg Castle from 1931. He is also remembered for rediscovering the original manuscript for Leonora Christine's Jammers Minde.

== Early life and education ==
Andrup was born on 8 October 1883 in Randers, the son of pharmacist Otto William Andrup (1853–1909) and Frederikke Mariane Louise Levring (1855–1902). He matriculated from Randers Latin School.

== Career ==
Andrip started working for the Frederiksborg Museum in 1910. He became a museum inspector in 1010 and the museum's 1st inspector in 1927. In 1931 he was appointed as the museum's director.

== Awards ==
Andrup was created a Knight of the Order of the Dannebrog in 1926. He was awarded the Cross of Honour in 1933. He became a 2n-class Commander of the Order of the Dannebrog in 1948.
