= Ernst Hansen =

Danish painter

- Born: 29 October 1892; Ringkøbing, Denmark
- Died: 8 May 1968 (aged 75); Copenhagen, Denmark
- Occupation: Painter

Ernst Hansen (29 October 1892 – 8 May 1968) was a Danish painter. His work was part of the painting event in the art competition at the 1932 Summer Olympics.
