= Erhardine Adolphine Hansen =

Danish actress

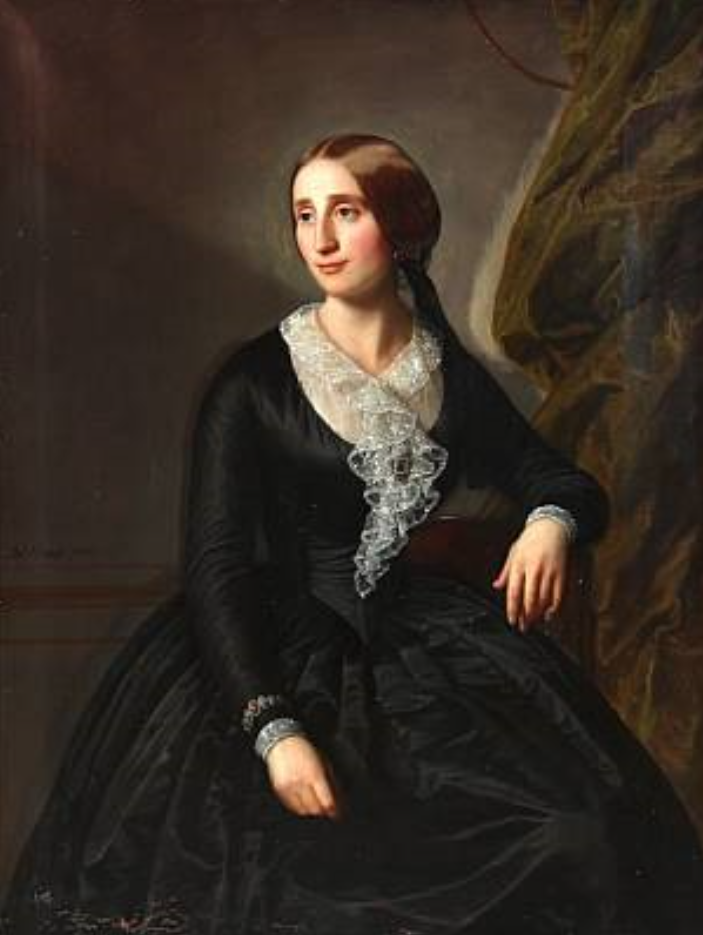
- Born: 23 September 1815; Copenhagen, Denmark
- Died: 10 June 1893 (aged 77); Copenhagen, Denmark
- Occupation: Actress
- Years active: 1833–1861
- Spouse: Jørgen Christian Hansen

Erhardine Adolphine "Ravnsberg" Hansen née Rantzau (23 September 1815 – 10 June 1893) was a Danish actress who was active at the Royal Danish Theatre in the period 1833–1861. She was married to royal chamber singer Jørgen Christian Hansen.

== Early life ==
She was born on 23 September 1815 in Copenhagen, the daughter of Erhardt, Count Rantzau and Frederikke Antonette née Rummelhoff.

== Career ==
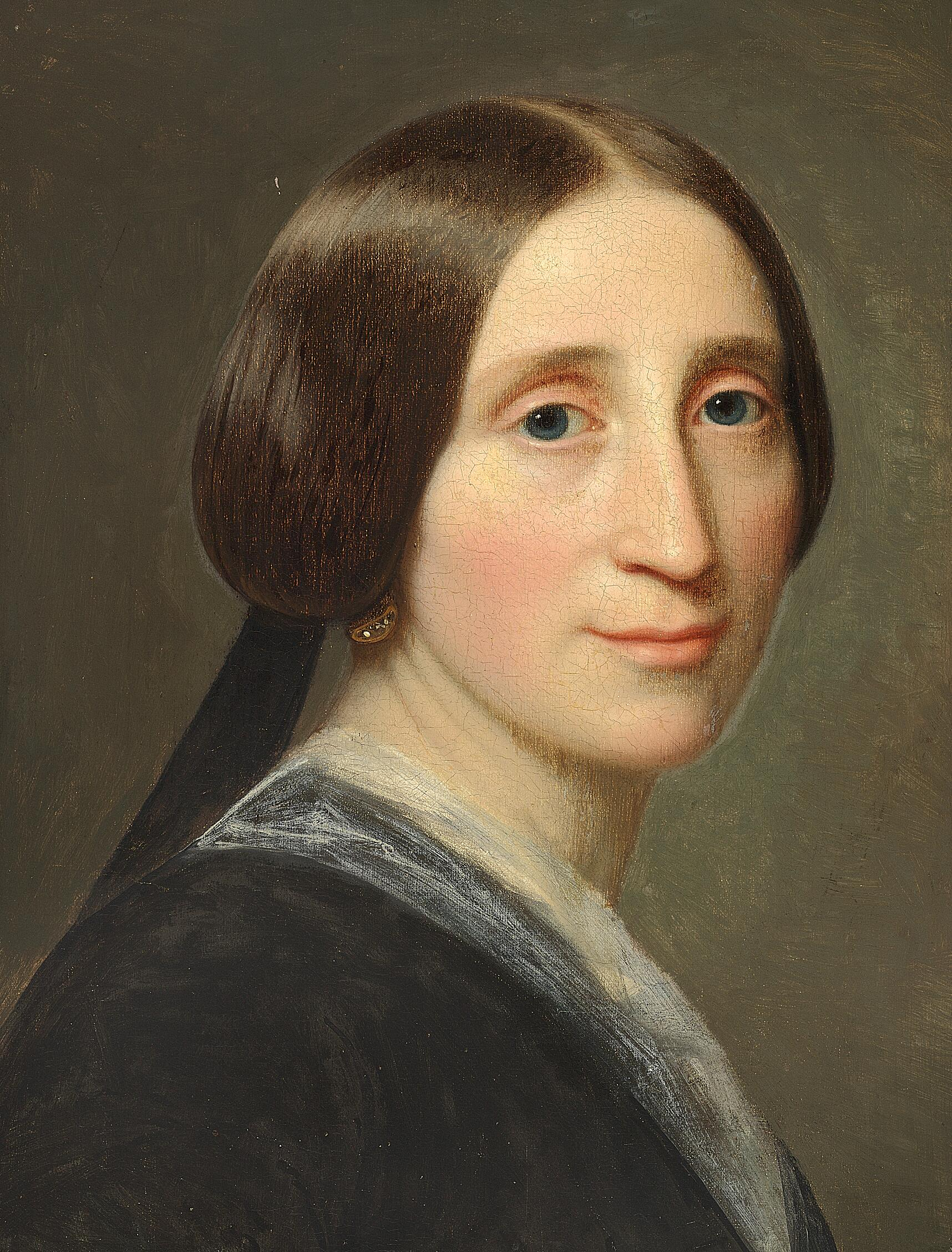
Portrait by David Monies

She had her debut at the Royal Danish Theatre on 5 December 1833 as Nina in De 7 militære Piger. Later roles included

The title role in Valerie (1835), Ida Münster in Hermann v. Unna (1835), Fru Nothington in Capriciosa (1839), Elisabeth Munk in Elverhøj (1840), Esperance in Østergade og Vestergade (1842), Frøkenen in Den nye Barselstue (1845), Fru Krans in Æventyr paa Fodrejsen (1848) and Regan and Goneril in King Lear (1851 and 1858). She made her last appearance on 30 May 1861 as Arianke Grovsmeds in Den politiske Kandestøber.

== Personal life ==
She married royal chamber singer Jørgen Christian Hansen on 4 May 1836. They had six children of which two reached adulthood:

- Carl Christian Jørgen Hansen (29 July 1838 - 8 April 1902)
- Augusta Magdalene Hansen (25 February 1841 - 20 November 1894)
