= Peter Tanev =

Danish weather presenter (born 1968)

Peter Tanev (born 1968) is a Danish weather presenter who has been presenting weather forecasts for TV 2 since 1996. He has a bachelor's degree in climatology from the University of Copenhagen.

Tanev's father was Bulgarian and he was raised as a Catholic.

In addition to his work on television, Tanev also lectures about the weather, climate and the environment and has published two books.
