= Hans Nielsen Jeppesen =

Danish merchant (1815–1883)

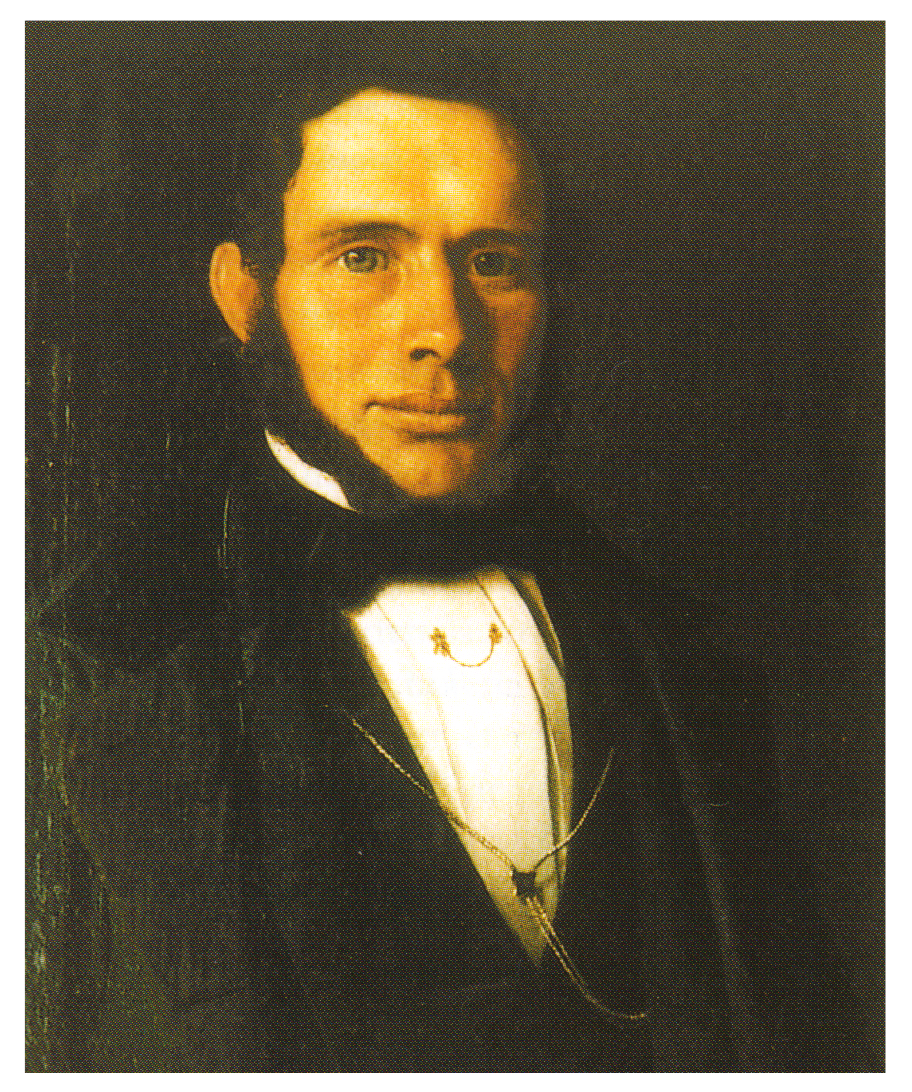
- Portrait of Jeppesen
- Born: 15 February 1815; Dragør, Denmark
- Died: 8 October 1883 (aged 68); Dragør, Denmark
- Occupation: Businessman

Hans Nielsen Jeppesen (15 February 1815 – 8 October 1883) was a Danish merchant and ship-owner. He bought his first ship in 1850 and his fleet of merchant ships later grew to 10 ships. He was the maternal grandfather of Mærsk- founder Arnold Peter Møller.

== Early life and career ==
Jeppesen was born on 15 February 1815 in Dragør, the son of Niels Taarnby Jeppesen and Marchen Hansdatter Møller. The family lived at Von Ostensgade 8. He went to sea at an early age and passed his exams as helmsman at the Navigation School in 1835 but did not have enough practical experience to work as a helmsman until 1838.

He began to work for Chr. Broberg & Søn in 1841 and was on 28 May 1842 granted citizenship in Copenhagen. He was captain on Chr. Broberg's schooner Thomas Lawrence in 1842–1851.

== Ship-owner ==
Jeppesen's first ship, Elosabeth, commissioned from a shipyard in Kalmar in 1852, was already lost in 1855. His second ship, Prima, was also commissioned directly from a shipyard. The rest of his ships were all used ships bought from other ship-owners. Only two of his ships, Coquette and Ellerslie, were owned in partnerships with others. By the 1870s, his fleet had grown to 10 ships.

=== Ships ===
This list may be incomplete

Name	Image	Owned	Type	Built	Comments	Ref
Carksten		1851-1859		837	Owned by Hans Nielsen Jeppesen's father but still used by the son in 1859	
Elisabeth		1852-1855	Schooner	1852; Kalmar		Ref
Prima		1855-1884	Skonnertbrig	1854; Kalmar		Ref
Premier		1858-1862	Schooner			
Ciquette		1860-1861	Skonnertbrig	1839	Owned in a partnership with captain Isbrandt Raagaard. wrecked at Læsø in 1861.	
Fraternitas		1861-1884	Skonnertbrig	1847; Sweden	Sold by Jeppesen's widow in 1884 to her son-in-law Louis Rosenkold.	Ref
Orrest		1861-1887	Slup	Unknown	Sold by Jeppesen's widow in 1887 to Andreas Jensen and his son Palm Andreas Jensen, Dragør	
Elisabeth		1863-1869	Brig	1841		Ref
Ellerlie		1863-1881	Barque	1840; England	Wrecked at Scotland in 1867 but repaired; Broken up in 1881.	
Treue		1864-1884	Barque	1839; Memel	Sold by Jeppesen's widow in 1886 to Sweden where it was sunk and used as a breakwater at Höganäs	Ref
Cora		1870-1872	Brig	11839; Krøyers Plads, Copenhagen	Sank in the Bay of Køge on 13 November 1872	Ref
Ino		1870-1884	Schooner	1844; Burg, Germany	Broken up in Dragør in 1994	Ref
Enighed		1872-1877	Barque	1837; Vegesack / Bremen	Sank en route from Greenland to Philadelphia in 1877	Ref
Antares		1872-1883	Skonnertbrig	1862; Greifswald	Sold to captain H. R. Stærke in 1885. Ommel,	Ref
Fortuna		1872-1882	Schooner	1816		Ref
Valkyrien		1874-1883	Barque	1850; Libau	Wrecked on 12 December 1883 off Ayr in Scotland	Ref
Paradis		1880-1883	Barque	1860; Vegesack / Bremen	Wrecked en route between Newcastle and St. Croix on 16 February 1886 off Slapton Sands at Dorthmund.	Ref

== Personal life ==
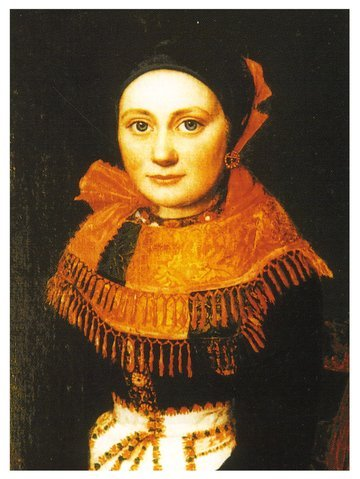
Leisebeth Jens Hansen Snedkers

Jeppesen was married to Leisebeth Jens Hansen Snedkers and the couple had seven daughters. His eldest daughter, Anna, married Peter Mærsk Møller. His youngest daughter, Nicoline, married Jacob Cornelius Isbrandtsen, and was the mother of Hans Isbrandtsen, New York.

The family lived at Elisenborg, a large property on the western outskirts of Dragør. Jeppesen died when a dinghy capsized off Dragør in 1883. He was at the time of his death the owner of eight ships. His widow closed the company down over the next one and a half years.
