= Carl Balsgaard =

Danish painter

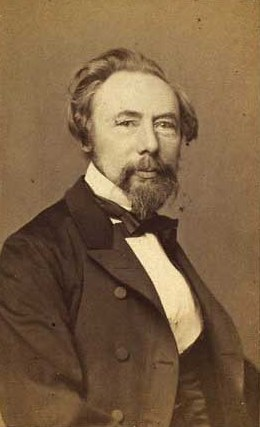
Carl Balsgaard (1870s)

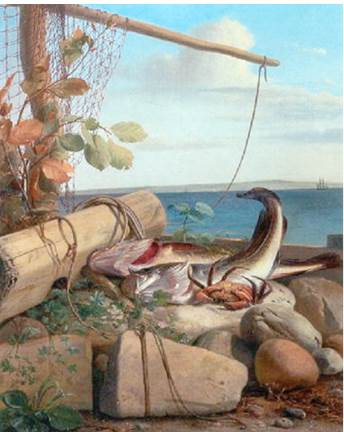
Still-life with Fish and Crab; one of his few without fruits or flowers.

Carl Vilhelm Balsgaard (24 December 1812, Copenhagen - 14 August 1893, Copenhagen) was a Danish painter; primarily of still-lifes.

== Biography ==
His father was an accountant and auditor. He studied under Christoffer Wilhelm Eckersberg at the Royal Danish Academy of Fine Arts, with the intent of becoming a figure painter, and won a small silver medal for live model drawing in 1841.

However, in 1835, he had exhibited a series of still lifes and, when it became necessary to support himself by his work, he turned to painting fruits and flowers on porcelain. In 1843, the year he was married, he competed for the Neuhausenske Prize with a portrait of Bertel Thorvaldsen, but was unsuccessful.

After that, he devoted most of his time to fruit and flower painting and, in 1855, received a grant from the Academy that would allow him to study abroad for two years. During that time, he visited Berlin, Dresden, Düsseldorf and Paris. After returning home in 1858, he was elected a member of the Academy.

In 1864, he was appointed Inspector for the private art collection of King Christian IX and gave art lessons to Queen Louise. The following year, he was an unsuccessful candidate for the Academy's new professorship of decorative painting.

In 1865, he applied for the post of Director of the Royal Art Collection (now the National Gallery of Denmark), but the position went to C.J. Thomsen. Two years later, as compensation, he was appointed a Professor at the Academy. His wife died the following year. To ease his grief, he travelled; notably to Italy from 1872 to 1873.

He was appointed Knight of the Order of the Dannebrog in 1892 and died the following year.
