= Anker Heegaard =

Danish industrialist (1815–1893)

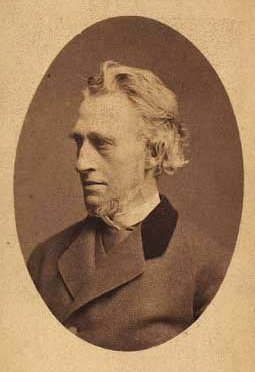
- Born: 29 July 1812; Copenhagen, Denmark
- Died: 19 September 1893 (aged 81); Copenhagen, Denmark
- Occupation: Businessman
- Awards: Knight of the Order of the Dannebrog, 1859, Dannebrosmand, 1872

Steffen Peder Anker Heegaard (29 July 1815 – 19 September 1893) was a Danish industrialist. His company was headquartered in Havnegade in Copenhagen and operated two manufacturing sites in Nørrebro and Frederiksværk. Products included cast ironware, steam engines and agricultural machines. He was a member of the Copenhagen City Council from 1868 to 1885 and president of Industriforeningen from 1871 to 1876.

== Early life ==
Heegaard was born in Copenhagen, the son of Mathias Anker Heegaard (1776–1837) and Henrikke Baggine Heegaard née Hornemann (1780–1849). His father was the owner of a hardware store and in 1828 also established a small iron foundry in Nørrebro. After his confirmation, Heegaard became an apprentice in his father's hardware store. He also attended Det von Westenske Institut in Nørregade.

== Career ==
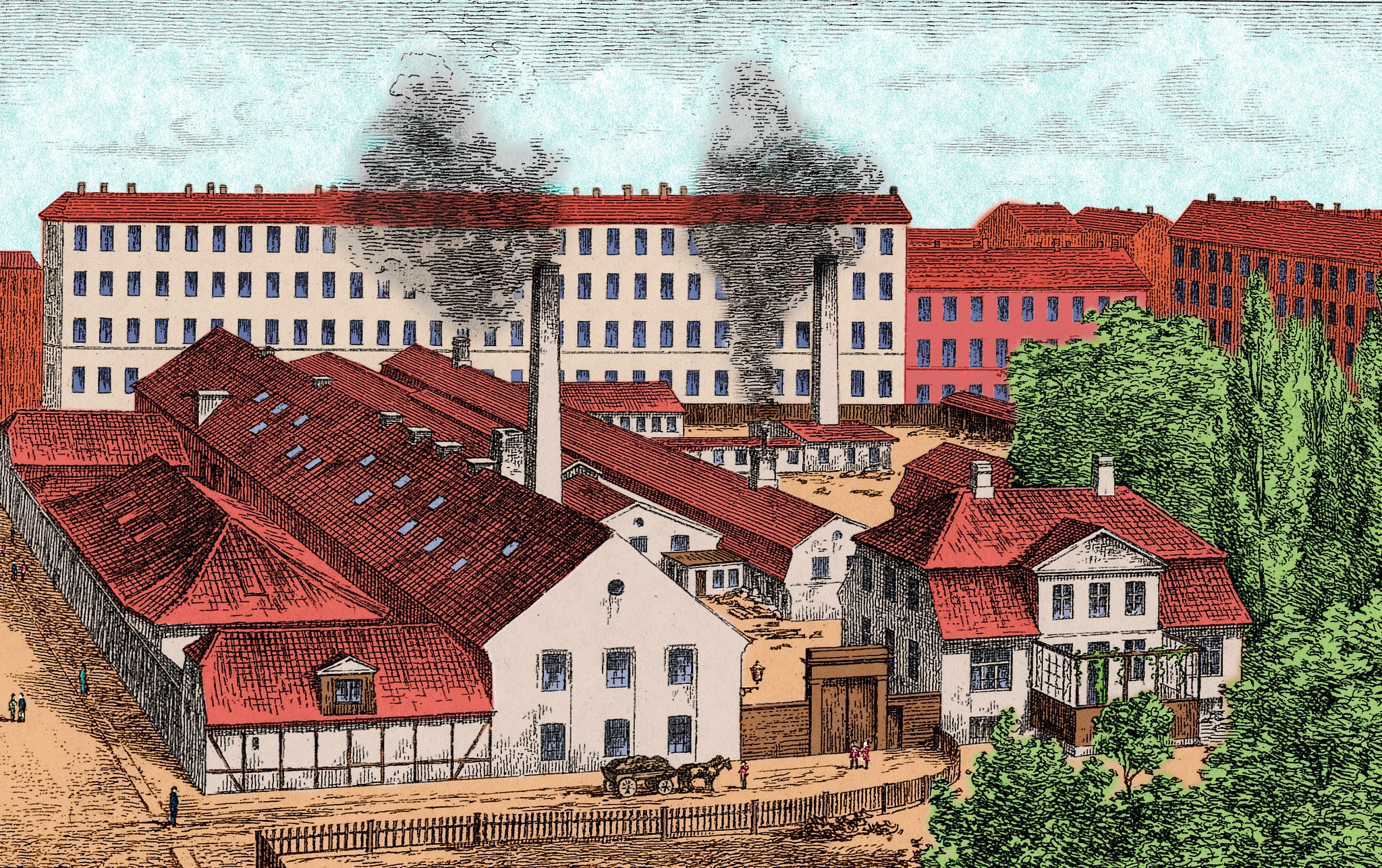
Heegaard's iron foundry and villa.

Heegaard and his elder brother Christian August Heegaard (1810–1879) continued their father's business after his death in 1837.

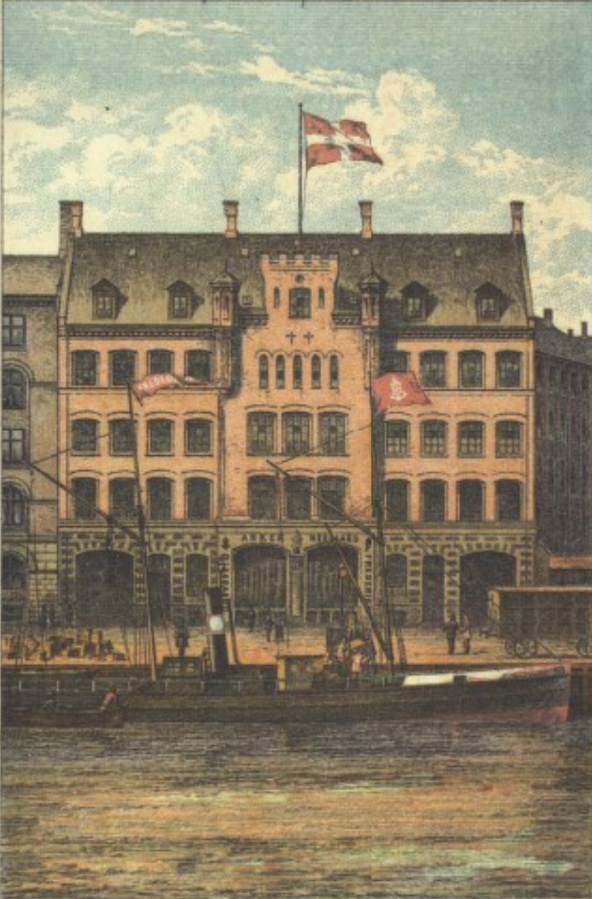
Anker Heegaard's headquarters in Havnegade in Copenhagen

Anker Hegaard became the sole owner of the iron foundry in 1847. The company had by then also moved into the market for industrial and agricultural machines. It gradually developed into one of the largest of its kind in the country, In 1857, he acquired Frederick's Works in Frederiksværk inn auction for 188,000 Danish rigsdaler from the government. He installed a steam engine and constructed a harbor at the site. That same year he also acquired a ceramic manufactory in Blågårdsgade in Copenhagen which specialized in salt-glazed pipes. The site was then converted into an iron foundry. The company constructed a new head office and storage facilities at Havnegade 37 in 1870. A wide selection of its products, from enameled pots and other kitchenware to machines, was featured on the 1872 Nordic Exhibition.

== Organisations ==
Heegaard was a co-founder of the Free Trade Society (Frihandelsforeningen) in 1862 but later argued in favour of more protectionist policies. He was president of Industriforeningen from 1871 to 1876. The organisation was the driving force behind the 1872 Nordic Exhibition in Copenhagen. Another important initiative was the opening of the new Technical Society's School in Nørre Voldgade in 1876. He also served on the board of Arbejderforeningen af 1860, where he worked for the realization of the association's new headquarters which opened in 1986. He was a member of the Copenhagen City Council from 1868 to 1885 and a co-founder of Dansk Sparemærkekasse in 1881.

== Personal life and legacy ==
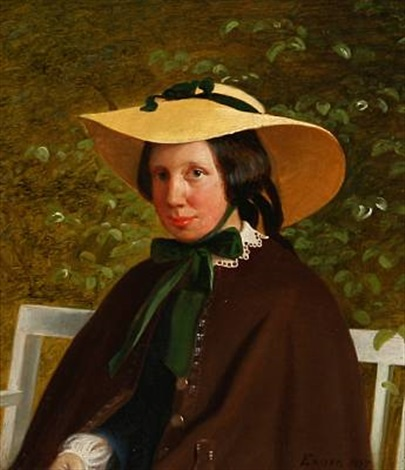
Louise Heegaard, née Feilberg, painted by Julius Exner in 1857

Heegaard married Louise Christine Feilberg (11 December 1821 – 13 January 1905 ) on 14 September 1844 in Sindsted. She was the daughter of the Bank of Denmark's office manager, Henning Frederik Feilberg (1771–1841).

Heegaard retired in 1884, ceding his company to his sons Louis Heegaard (1845–1914) and Henning Frederik Christian Mathias Anker Heegaard (1858–1910) and son-in-law Bjørn Stephensen (1855–1940).

Heegaard was made a Knight of the Order of the Dannebrog in 1872 and etatsråd in 1883. He died on 19 September 1893 and was buried in Assistens Cemetery in Copenhagen. He left DKK 350,000 to charity.

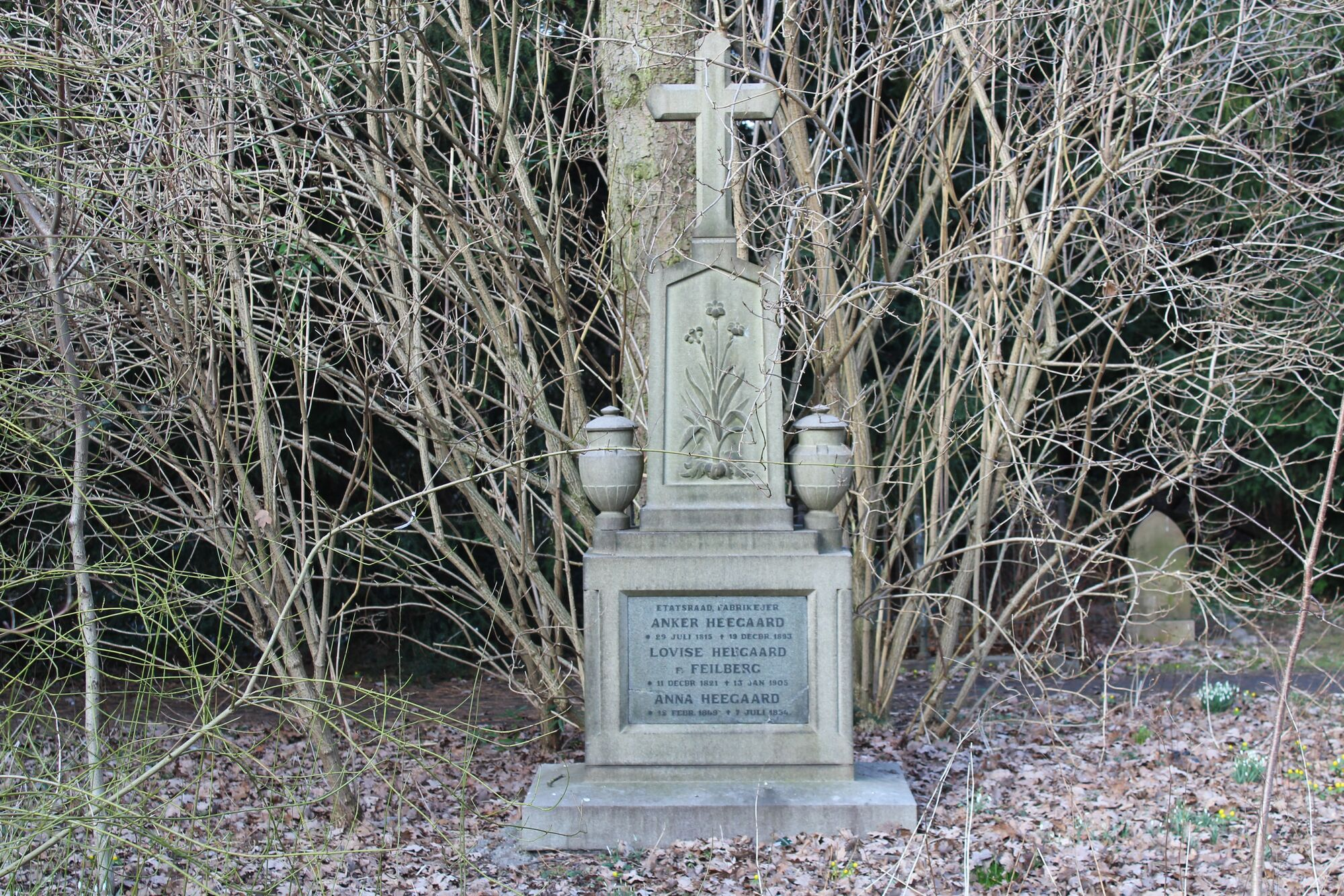
Anker Heegaard's tombstone in Copenhagen's Assistens Cemetery.

His heirs operated the iron foundry in Copenhagen. Their Frederiksværk operations merged with Svendborg-based L. Lange & Co. in 1918. The company was merged into De forende Jernstøberier in 1930.

He is commemorated with a bust at Gjethjuset in Frederiksværk. It was created by Louis Hasselriis. Anker Heegaards Gade in the Rysensteen Wiarter of Copenhagen and Anker Heegaardsgade in Frederiksværk are named after him.
