= Thorald Brendstrup =

Danish painter

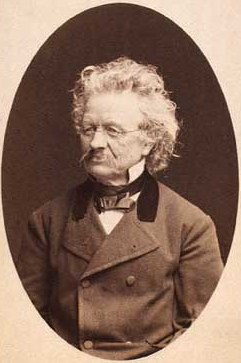
Thorald Brendstrup

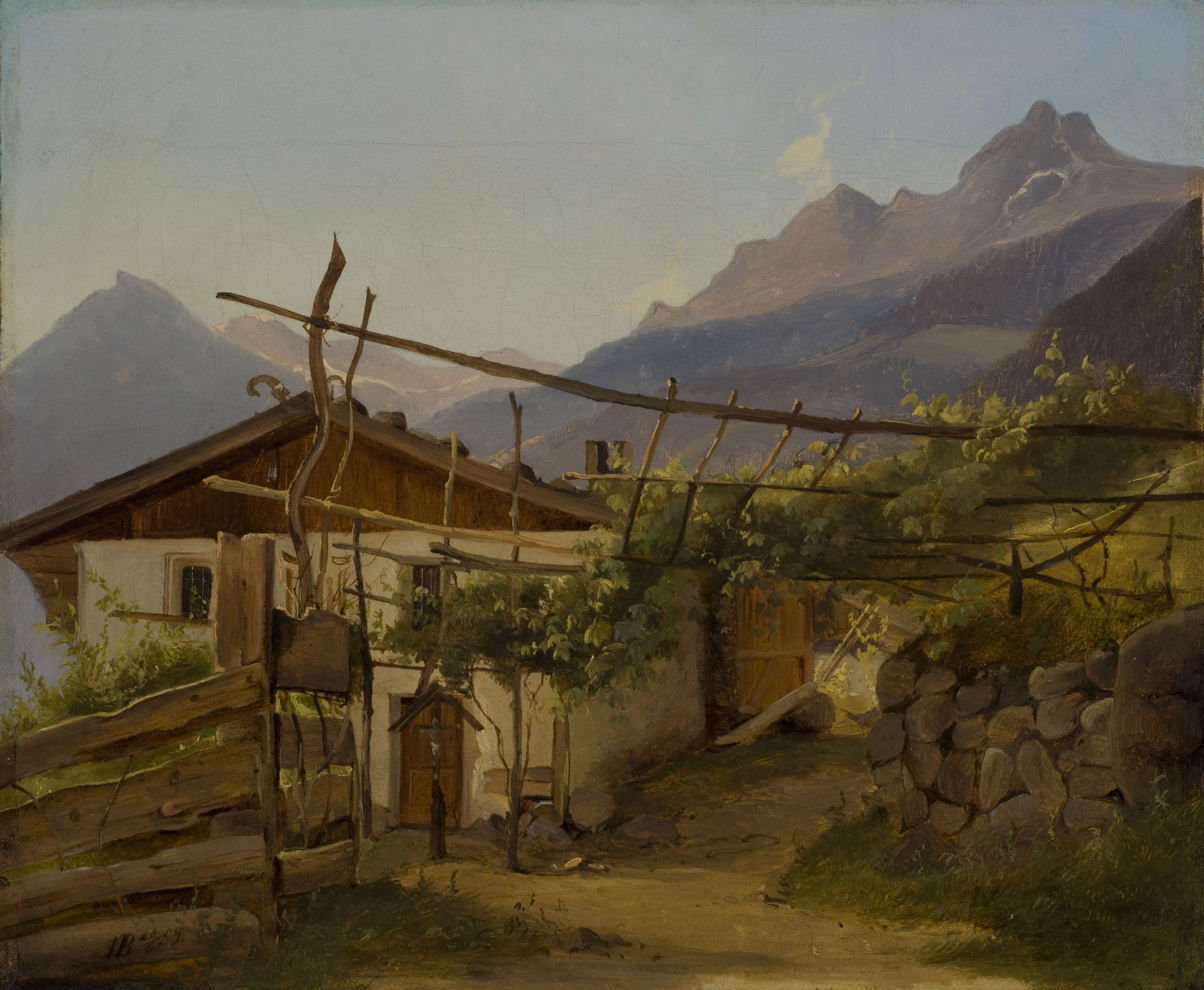
Mountain Hut with Climbing Vine, 1859

Thorald Brendstrup (25 May 1812, Sengeløse, near Taastrup – 4 May 1883, Copenhagen) was one of Denmark's Golden Age painters. Although he is not particularly well known, he is credited above all with many well-proportioned landscapes.

== Biography ==
Brendstrup studied decorative painting at the Danish Academy and porcelain painting at the Royal Danish Porcelain factory where he worked until 1846. Thereafter he concentrated on landscape painting.

Brendstrup's earlier works clearly show the influence of Eckersberg and Købke. He later painted landscapes in a highly Romantic style reminiscent of P. C. Skovgaard's. Especially his Italian landscapes demonstrate his deep appreciation of his subjects. His works are always well composed and clearly proportioned with a good sense of relationship between the foreground and the background while the colouring is faithful to the local tones. His works are often of a highly aesthetic quality, true to the tradition of the Danish Golden Age. One of the reasons Brendstrup is not widely recognized in Denmark is that he spent long periods abroad, often in Portugal and Italy. Furthermore, some of the landscapes he painted in and around Naples and the Italian town of Olevano were not acquired by museums in Denmark, and are now privately owned.

He exhibited regularly at Charlottenborg from 1835 to 1882, not only foreign landscapes but also Danish scenes, particularly from the north of Zealand.

In 2012 the first ever major exhibition on Brendstrup and his work was jointly organised by Fuglsang Art Museum and Ribe Art Museum, and a book issued on this occasion with the most updated research on the artist.

== Bibliography ==
Thorald Brendstrup - I guldalderens skygge. (In Danish). Edited by Gertrud Oelsner and Ingeborg Bugge. Aarhus Universitetsforlag 2011. Fuglsang Kunstmuseum and Ribe Kunstmuseum.

Gli artisti danesi ad Olevano Romano e dintorni dall’“Età dell’Oro” fin dentro il XXI secolo./ Danish artists in Olevano Romano and its surrounding area from the “Golden Age” into the 21st century. (In English and Italian). Author Jytte W. Keldborg, Board member of AMO onlus. Published in print and on the homepage July 2011 by AMO onlus – Associazione Amici del Museo di Olevano Romano onlus and Museo – Centro Studi sulla Pittura di Paesaggio Europea del Lazio.
