= Slagelse Hoard =

Danish gold find

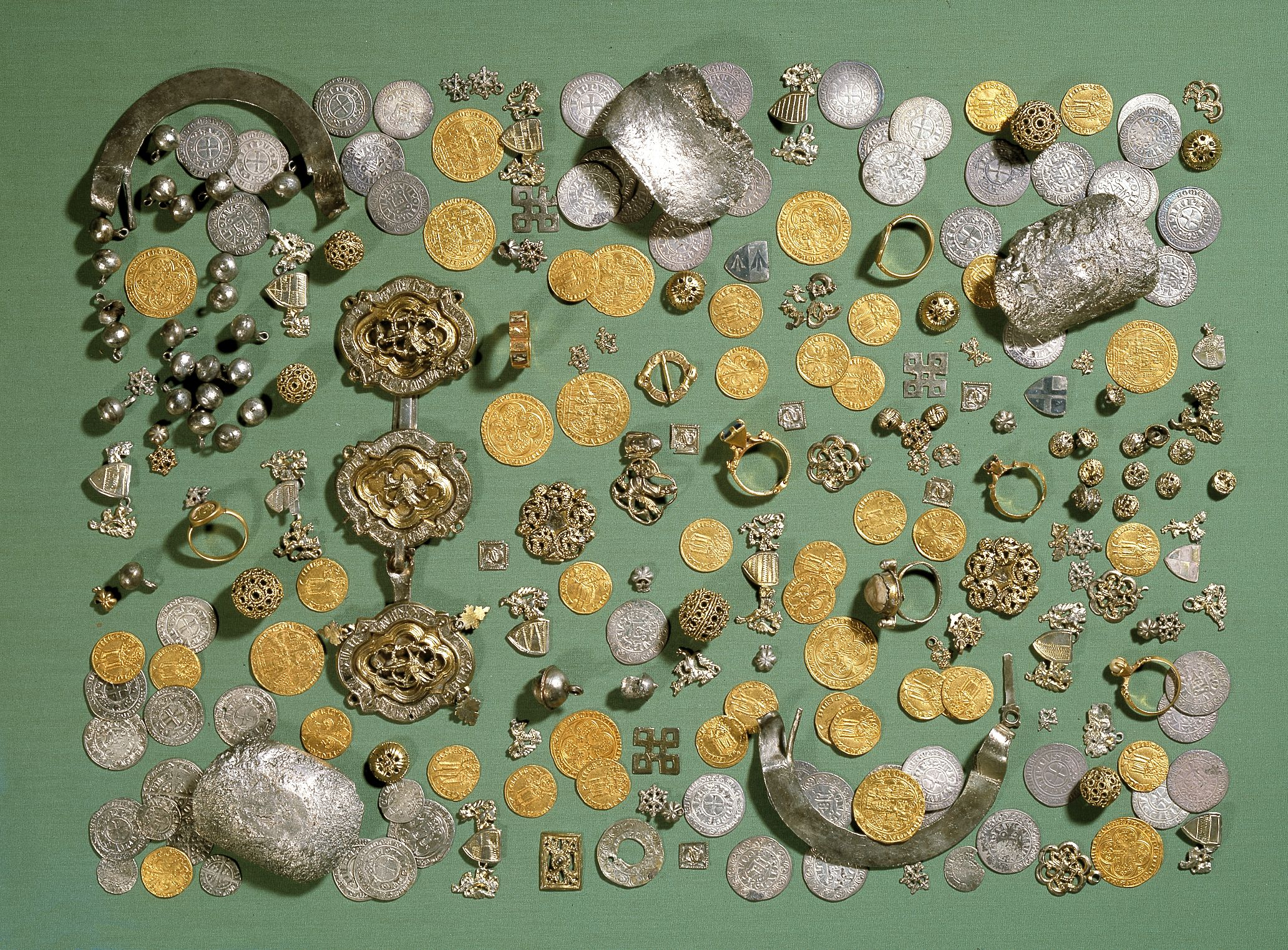
The Slagelse Hoard.

The Slagelse Hoard (Danish: Slagelseskatten), discovered in 1883 beneath a tile floor in a medieval cellar on Smedegade in Slagelse, is the largest medieval gold hoard ever discovered in Denmark.

== Discovery ==
The Slagelse Hoard was discovered in 1883 beneath a tile floor in a medieval basement on Smadegade in Slagelse. It was found by two construction workers. Their reward equalled more than a year's salary.

== Description ==
The hoard consisted of 186 European gold coins (total weight: c. 700 g (25 oz)), 269 European silver coins, four silver bars as well as jewellery (mainly finger rings), buckles and decorative garment components. The youngest coins date from 1372.

== Interpretation ==
It has been suggested that the hoard may be associated with the Danehof in Slagelse in 13876 where Olaf, at just six years old, was elected as the successor to his grandfather Valdemar IV.
