= 1885 in Denmark =

- Decades: 1860s; 1870s; 1880s; 1890s; 1900s
- See also: Other events of 1885; List of years in Denmark

Events from the year 1885 in Denmark.

== Incumbents ==
- Monarch – Christian IX
- Prime minister – J. B. S. Estrup

== Events ==
- January – The magazine Kvinden & Samfundet is established.
- 1 October – DSB is founded through the merger of the state-owned Zealand Railway Company and Jutland-Funen Railway Company.

=== Undated ===
- The Danish Union of Joiners is established.
- Kvindelig Fremskridtsforening is founded.

== Sports ==
- 13 May – Aalborg Boldspilklub is founded.

== Births ==
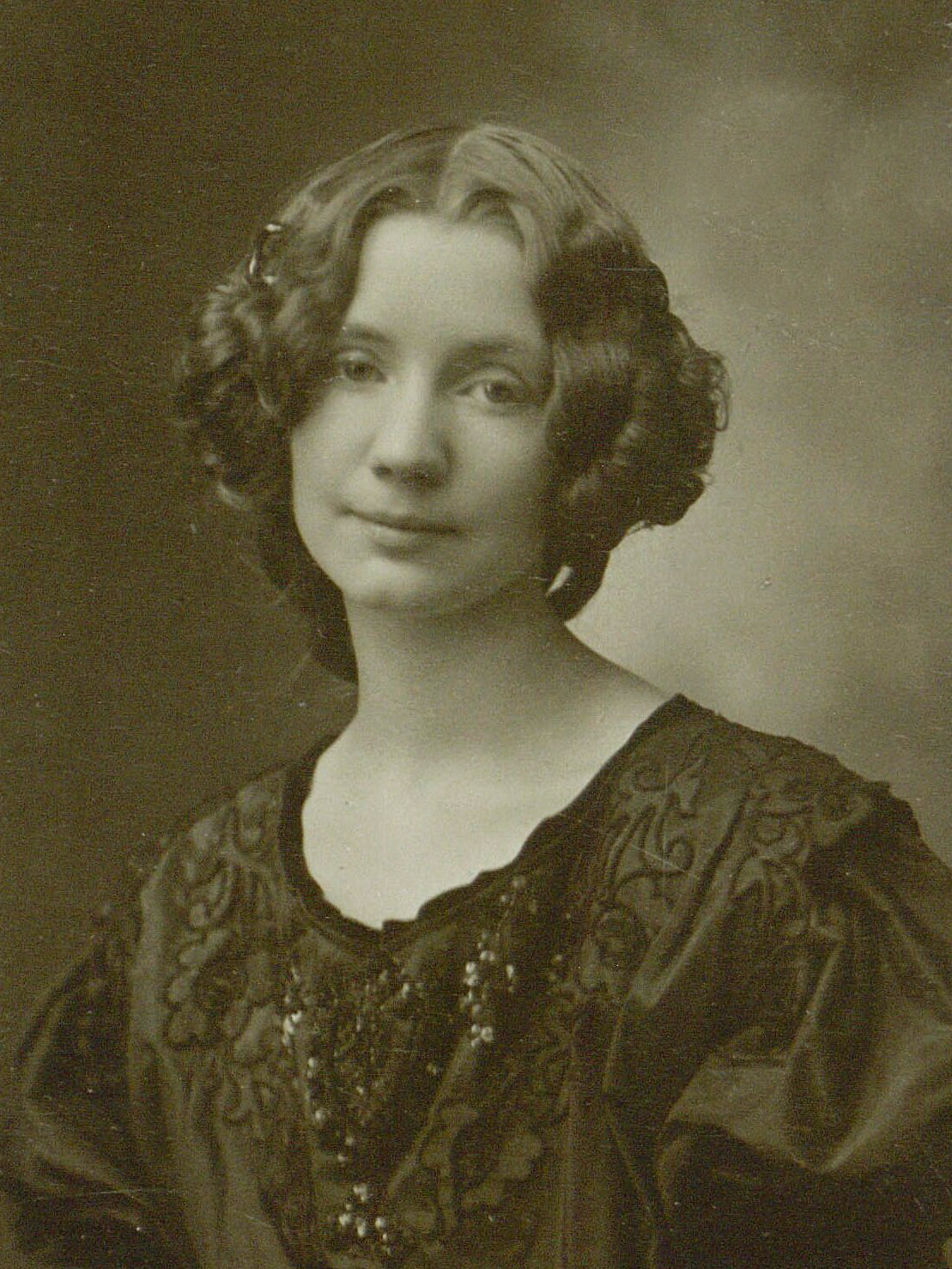
Gerda Wegener,

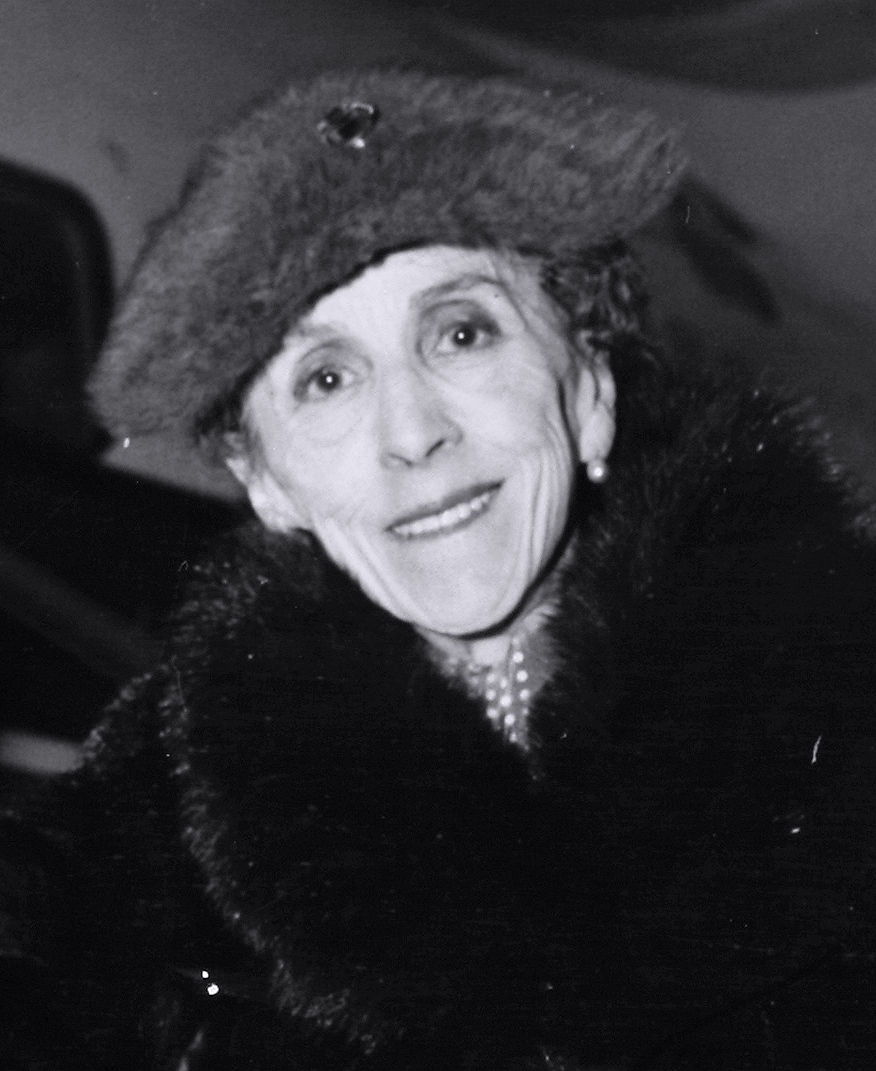
Karen Blixen.

=== January–March ===
- 13 January – Rasmus Hansen, gymnast (died 1967)
- 21 February
  - Halvor Birch, gymnast (died 1962)
  - Thøger Thøgersen, politician /died 1947)
- 25 February – Christian Petersen, sculptor (died 1961 in USA)
- 5 March – Gerda Wegener, illustrator and painter (died 1940)
- 22 March – Jens Kristian Jensen, gymnast (died 1956)

=== April–June ===
- 2 April – Rikard Magnussen, sculptor (died 1948)
- 6 April – Holcha Krake, artist (died 1944 in USA)
- 17 April – Karen Blixen (died 1962)
- 23 April – Jais Nielsen, painter (died 1961)

=== October–December ===
- 7 October – Niels Bohr, theoretical physicist (died 1962)
- 23 October – Julius Lehrmann. sports shooter (died 1962)
- 26 October – Niels Erik Nørlund, mathematician (died 1981)
- 25 November – Daniel Andersen, composer, sculptor and ceramist (died 1959)
- 15 December – Cay Lembcke, co-founder of the Danish Boy Schots movement (died 1965)

== Deaths ==
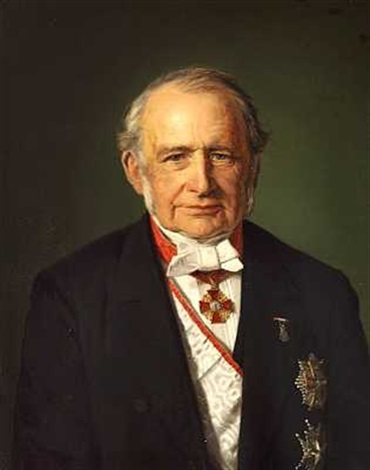
Jens Peter Trap.

=== January–March ===
- 21 January – Jens Peter Trap, royal secretary, topographical writer and publisher (born 1810)
- 25 February – Mozart Waagepetersen, businessman (born 1813)

=== April–June ===
- 27 April – Hans Vilhelm Kaalund, poet (born 1818)
- 30 April – Jens Peter Jacobsenm author (born 1847)
- 2 May — Peter Ludvig Panum, physiologist (born 1820)

=== July–September ===
- 2 June – Edouard Buntzen, lawyer and politician (born 1809)
- 12 July – Ferdinand Victor Alphons Prosch, vetenarian and biologist (born 1820)
- 21 September – Georg Emil Tuxen. maval officer (born 1814)

=== October–December ===
- 11 November – Oswald Sickert, artist (born 1929)
- 11 December – Niels Simonsen, painter, lithographer and sculptor (born 1807)
