= 1956 in Denmark =

- Decades: 1930s; 1940s; 1950s; 1960s; 1970s
- See also: Other events of 1956; List of years in Denmark

Events from the year 1956 in Denmark.

== Incumbents ==
- Monarch – Frederik IX
- Prime minister – H. C. Hansen

== Events ==
- 15 February – Denmark and the People's Republic of China upgrade diplomatic relations from ministerial to ambassadorial level and exchange ambassadors.
- 1 June – Salling Group is founded.
- 17 March – The 1956 Danish general strike begins.

Ø 13 April Demonstrations are held in major cities around the country. The one in Copenhagen attracts around 200m000 people. Aksel Larsen gives a speech at Christiansborg Slotsplads.

- 15 April – The 1956 Danish general strike ends.

=== Undated ===
- The Danish Refugee Council was founded in response to the refugee crisis caused by the Soviet invasion of Hungary.
- Hørsholmvejen (now part of the Helsingør Motorway) becomes the first motorway in Denmark.
- N. Foss Electric is founded by Niels Foss.
- The Arnamagnæan Institute is founded.
- The new Tivoli Concert Hall is completed in Copenhagen.

== Culture ==
=== Music ===
- Four Jacks is founded.

== Sports ==
=== Badminton ===
- 17 March – Finn Kobberø and Jørgen Hammergaard Hansen win gold in Men's Double at the All England Badminton Championships

=== Cycling ===
- 27 Augustus – 2 September – The 1956 UCI Track Cycling World Championships are held in Copenhagen.

=== Football ===
- 2 June – BK Frem wins the 1955–56 Danish Cup by defeating AB 1–0 in the final.

=== Date unknown ===
- Dominique Forlini (FRA) and Georges Senfftleben (FRA) win the Six Days of Copenhagen six-day track cycling race.
- Lucien Gillen (LUX) and Gerrit Schulte (NED) win the Six Days of Copenhagen six-day track cycling race.

== Births ==
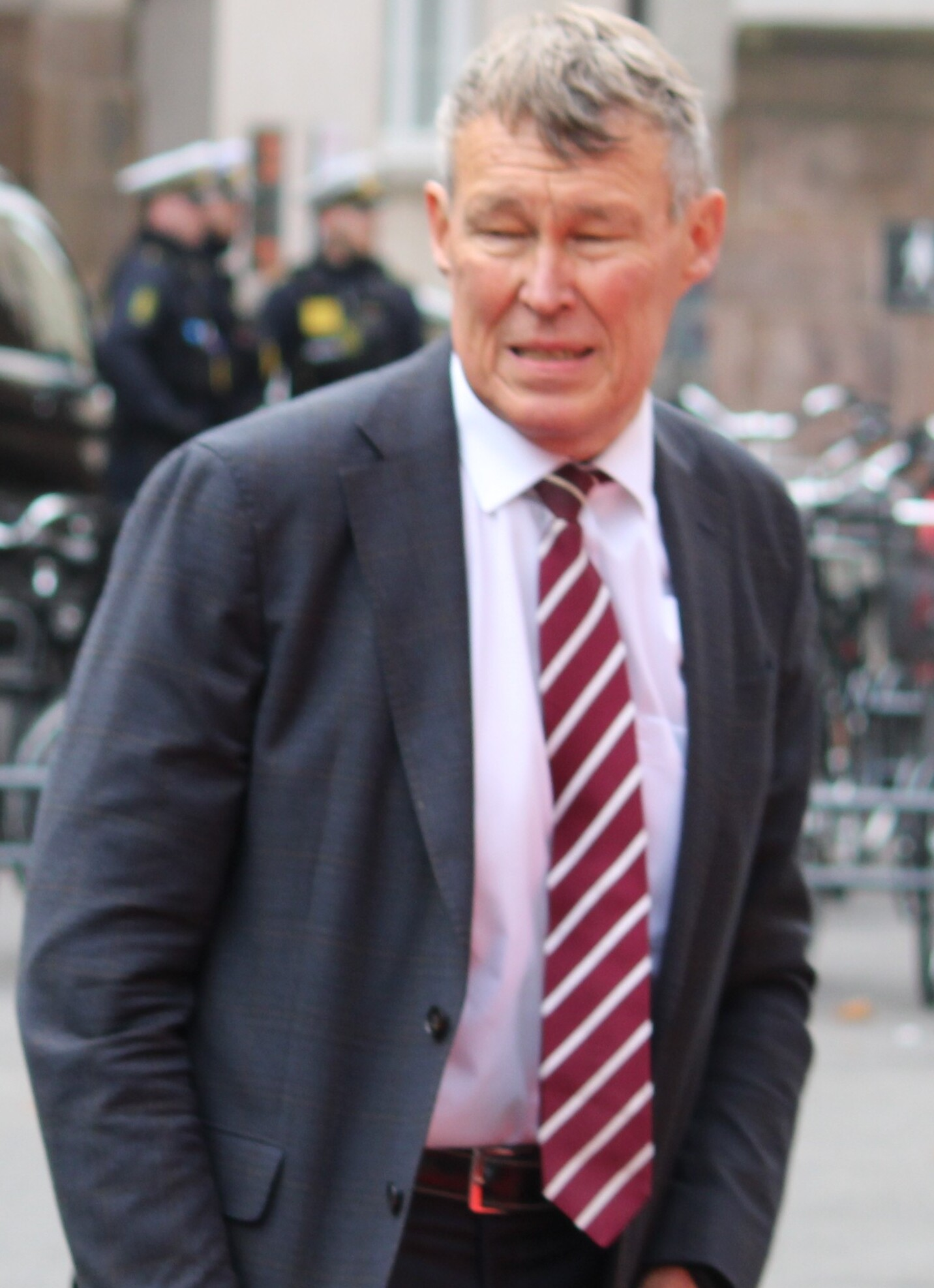
Jens Peter Christensen.

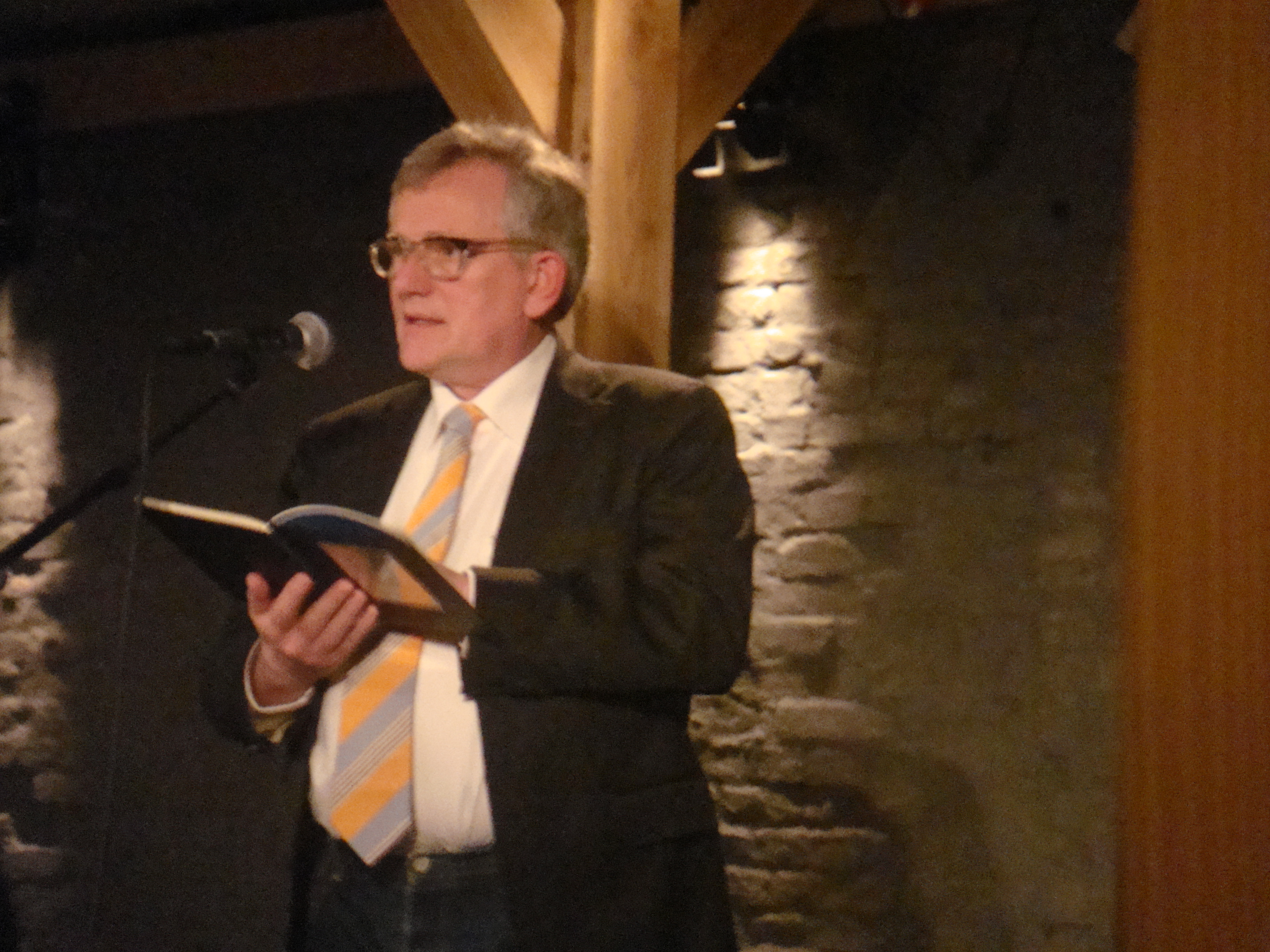
Søren Ulrik Thomsen.

=== January–March ===
- 17 February – Nina Høiberg, chess player
- 29 February – Birgit Aagard-Svendsen, business executive
- 13 March – John Frandsen, composer
- 18 March – Allan Olsen, folkrock musician and singer-songwriter

=== April–June ===
- 8 April – Peter Aalbæk Jensen, film producer
- 24 April – Steen Pade, composer
- 28 April – Henrik Wenzel, engineer
- 30 April – Lars von Trier, director and screenwriter
- 8 May – Søren Ulrik Thomsen, poet, essayist
- 10 May – Mickey Faerch, Danish-Canadian dancer, actress and rapper
- 18 May – Birgitte Bonnesen, business executive
- 19 May – Susanne Augustesen, football player
- 28 May – Poul Krebs, singer
- 14 June – Lim Petersen, aka King Diamond, singer

=== July–September ===
- 5 September – Henrik Birch, actor
- 6 September – Poul Lange, artist
- 16 September – Michael Falch, singer
- 30 September – Frank Arnesen, football player and manager

=== October–December ===
- 9 October – Ivan Nielsen, football player
- 1 November – Jens Peter Christensen, judge
- 3 November – Birgit Kleis, politician
- 29 November – Lene Tranberg, architect and co-founder of Lundgaard & Tranberg
- 14 December – Kristine Jensen, landscape architect
- 19 December – Jens Fink-Jensen, poet, author, photographer, composer and architect
- 30 December – Jes Holtsø, actor

=== Full date missing ===
- Kristine Jensen, landscape architect

== Deaths ==
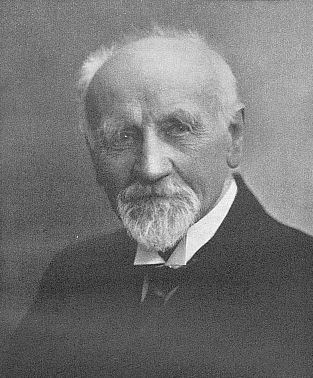
Morten Pedersen Porsild.

=== January–March ===
- 4 February – Peder Gram, composer and organist (born 1881)
- 13 February – Richard Olsen, rower (born 1911)
- 7 March – Johannes Gandil, athlete and footballer, competitor in athletics at the 1900 Summer Olympics, silver medallist in football at the 1908 Summer Olympics (born 1873)

=== April–June ===
- 30 April – Morten Pedersen Porsild, botanist active in Greenland (born 1872)
- 17 June – Leck Fischer, writer (born 1904)

=== July–September ===
- 21 July – Ejnar Nielsen, painter and illustrator, central proponent of symbolist painting (born 1872)
- 25 July – Estrid Hein, ophthalmologist and women's rights activist (born 1873)
- 31 August – Helvig Kinch, painter and illustrator (born 1872)

=== October–December ===
- 30 November – Viggo Wiehe, stage and film actor (born 1874)
- 5 December – Christian Christensen, track and field athlete, competitor at the 1900 Summer Olympics (born 1876)
