= 1959 in Denmark =

- Decades: 1930s; 1940s; 1950s; 1960s; 1970s
- See also: Other events of 1959; List of years in Denmark

Events from the year 1959 in Denmark.

== Incumbents ==
- Monarch – Frederik IX
- Prime minister – H. C. Hansen

== Events ==
- 7 January – MS Hans Hedtoft departs from Copenhagen on her maiden journey to Greenland.
- 14 January – M/S Hans Hedtoft arrives at Julianehåb.
- 30 January – M/S Hans Hedtoft sinks on the way back to Denmark. 95 lives are lost.

== Sports ==
=== Date unknown ===
- Palle Lykke Jensen (DEN) and Kay Werner Nielsen (DEN) win the Six Days of Copenhagen six-day track cycling race.

== Births ==
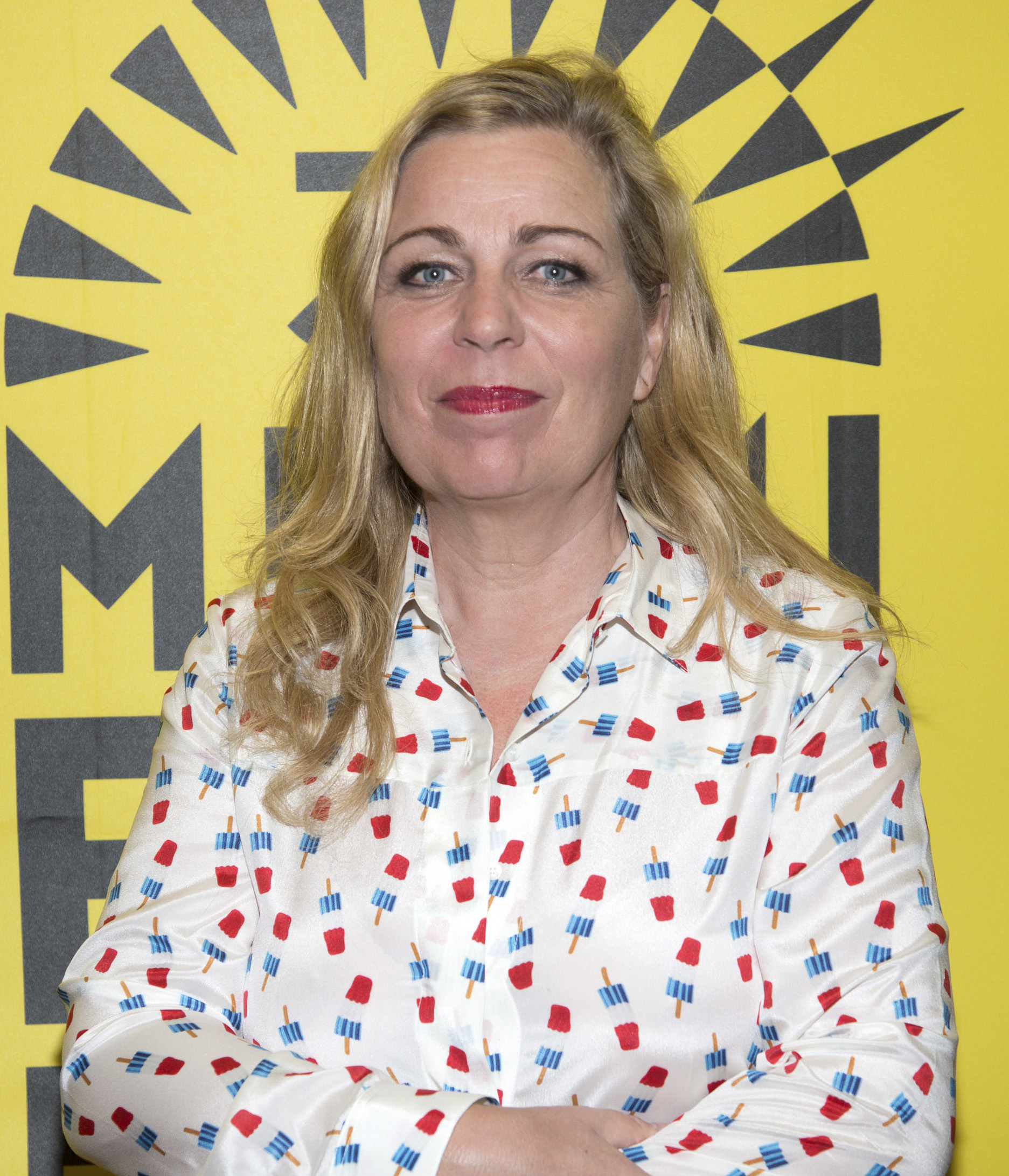
Lone Scherfig.

=== January–March ===
- 14 January – Lars Høgh, footballer
- 18 January – Bjarne Henriksen, actor
- 25 February – Poul Erik Tøjner, art historian and museum director

=== April–June ===
- 2 April – John Lauridsen, footballer
- 2 May – Lone Scherfig, film director
- 22 May – Kenneth Brylle, footballer
- 26 May – Ole Bornedal, film director
- 5 June – Jesper Worre, cyclist

=== July–September ===
- 22 August – Pia Gjellerup, politician
- 25 August – Christian Kettel Thomsen, governor of Danmarks Nationalbank
- 20 September – Mona Juul, politician

=== October–December ===
- 8 October – Erik Gundersen, speedway driver
- 13 November – Lene Hau, physicist
- 27 November – Pernille Sams, real estate agent, lawyer and politician
- 26 December – Hans Nielsen, speedway rider

== Deaths ==
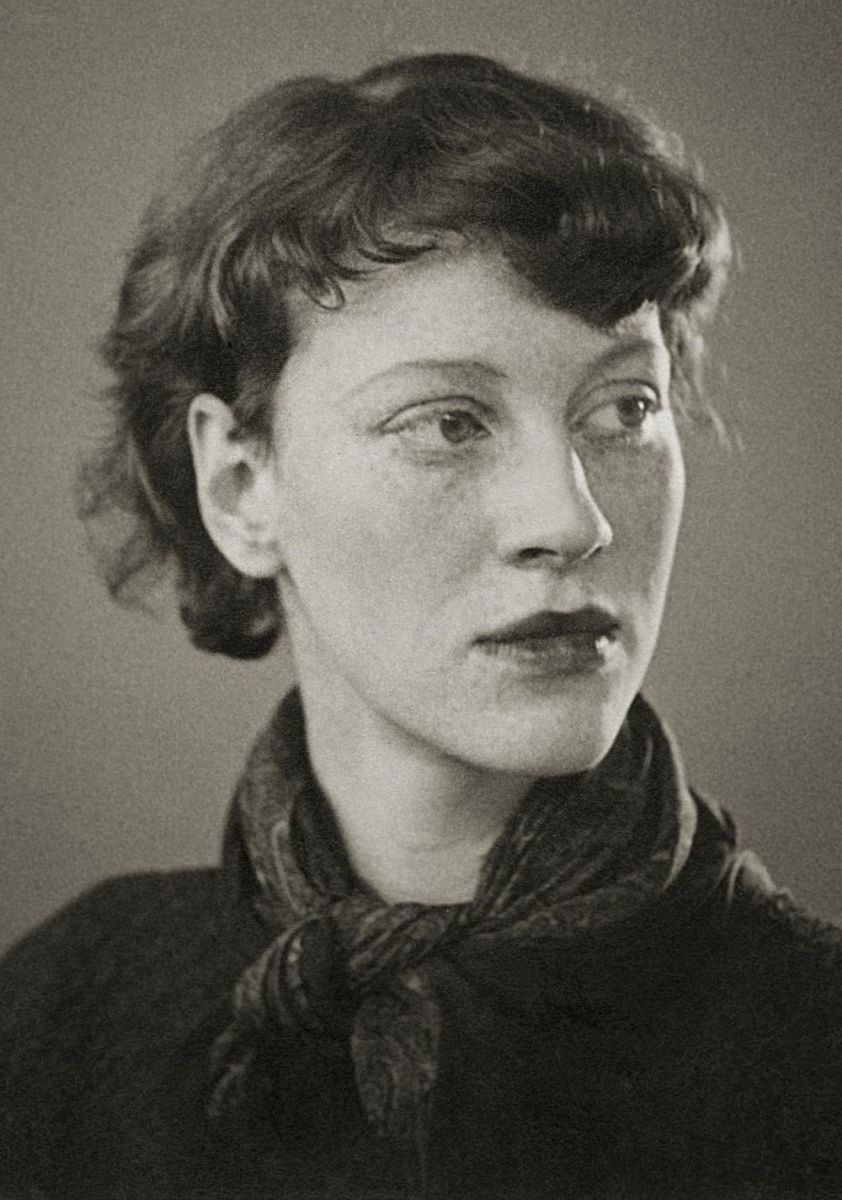
Ingrid Vang Nyman.

=== January–March ===
- 12 January – Edvard Eriksen, sculptor, creator of the Little Mermaid statue (born 1876)
- 17 February – Ellen Dahl, writer (born 1884)
- 24 February – Frederik Zeuthen, economist (born 1888)

=== April–June ===
- 13 April – Dagmar Hansen, cabaret singer and stage performer, Denmark's first pin-up girl (born 1871)
- 21 April – Hakon Andersen, organist and composer (born 1875)
- 30 April – Daniel Andersen, composer, sculptor and ceramist (born 1885)

=== July–September ===
- 8 August – Harald Christensen, wrestler (born 1884)
- 18 August – Johan Ankerstjerne, cinematographer (born 1886)
- 19 August – Gudrun Bjørner, teacher and politician (born 1898)
- 2 September – Sigvart Werner, amateur photographer famous for his artistic landscape photographs (born 1872)
- 20 September – William Scharff, painter (born 1886)

=== October–December ===
- 3 November – Frederik Torm, theologian (died 1870)
- 9 December – John Olsen, film producer (born 1888)
- 13 December – Ingrid Vang Nyman, illustrator (born 1916)

== See also ==
- 1959 in Danish television
