= 1962 in Denmark =

- Decades: 1940s; 1950s; 1960s; 1970s; 1980s
- See also: Other events of 1962; List of years in Denmark

Events from the year 1962 in Denmark.

== Incumbents ==
- Monarch – Frederik IX
- Prime minister – Viggo Kampmann (until 3 February), Jens Otto Krag

== Events ==
- 10 November – The Langeland Bridge is inaugurated.

== Sports ==
=== Badminton ===
- 21–24 March – All England Badminton Championships
  - Erland Kops wins gold in Men's Singles
  - Finn Kobberø and Jørgen Hammergaard Hansen win gold in Men's Doubles
  - Finn Kobberø and Ulla Strand win gold medal in Mixed Doubles.

=== Handball ===
- 15 July – Denmark wins silver at the 1962 World Women's Handball Championship, arranged in Romania, after being defeated by Romania in the final.

== Births ==
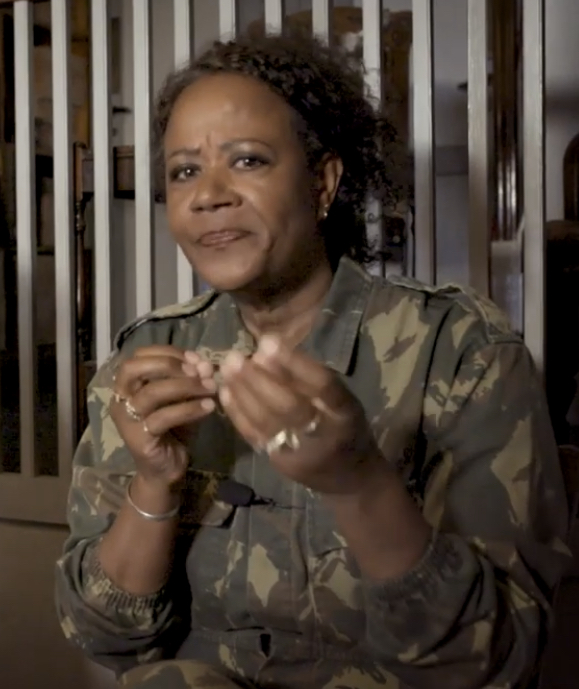
Hella Joof.

=== January–March ===
- 19 January – Saliha Marie Fetteh, writer, lecturer and imam.
- 21 February – Lars Ramkilde Knudsen, researcher
- Eric Kress, cinematographer

=== April–June ===
- 30 April – Eva Fjellerup, fencer
- 11 May – Arne Nielsson, canoeist
- 22 May – Bo Skovhus, opera singer
- 30 May – Pia Juul, poet, prose writer, and translator (died 2020)

=== July–September ===
- 7 July – Klaus Tange, actor
- 6 August – Søren Hyldgaard, film composer (died 2018)
- 15 August – Jesper W. Nielsen, film director and editor
- 16 August – Solvej Balle, writer

=== October–December ===
- 10 October – Peter Ingwersen, fashion designer
- 1 November – Hella Joof, actress, comedian, and director
- 30 November – Søren Steen Jespersen, director, producer and writer
- 1 December – Malene Birger, fashion designer

== Deaths ==
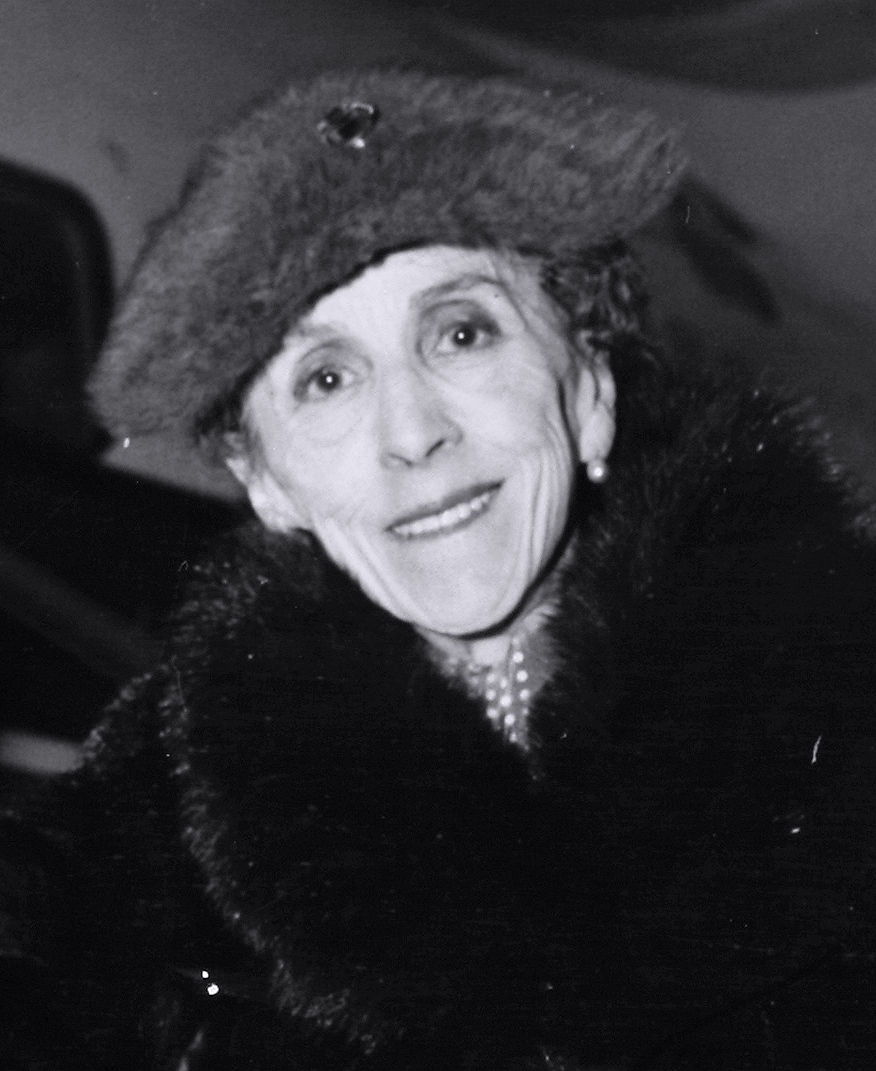
Karen Blixen.

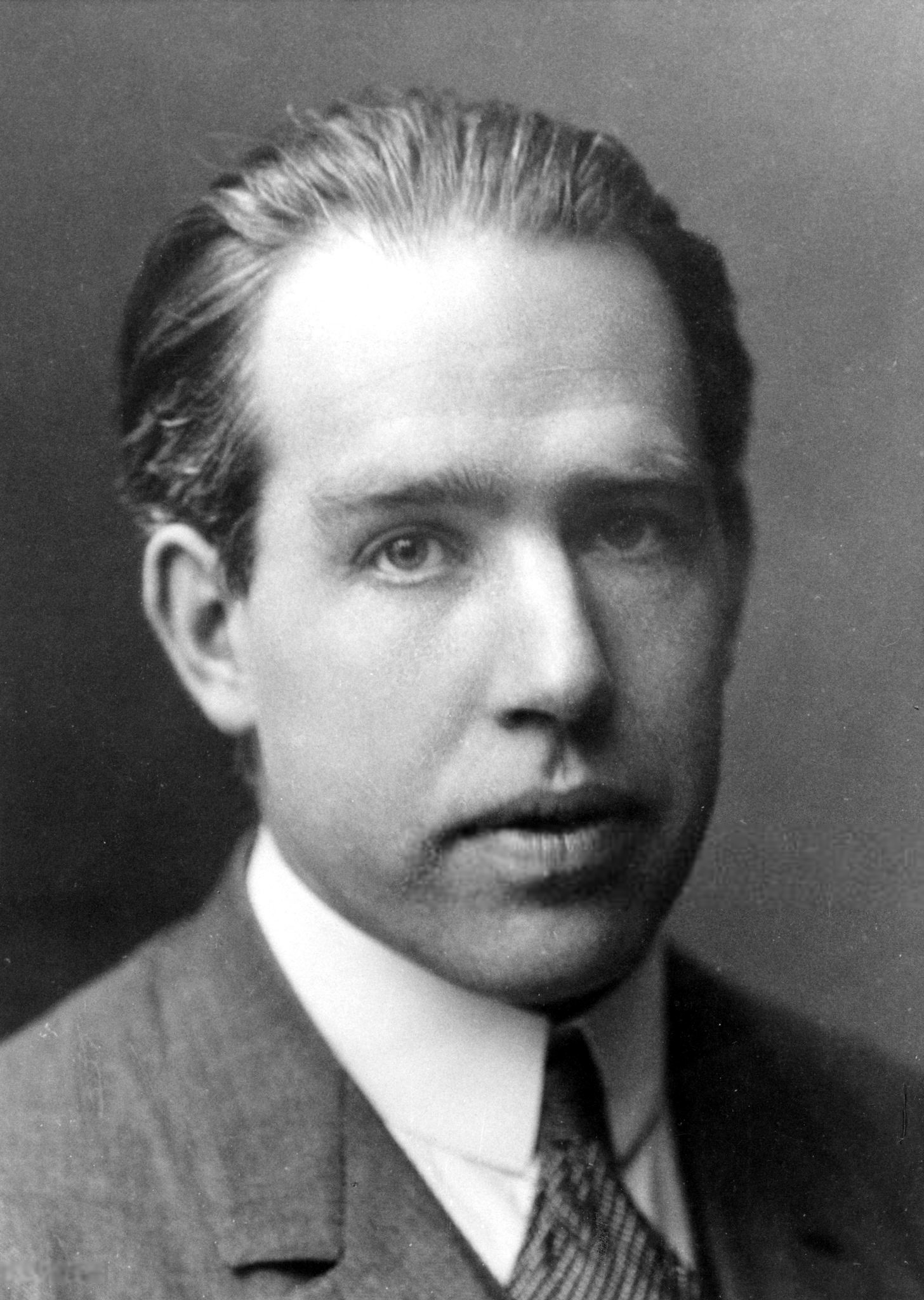
Niels Bohr.

=== April–June ===
- 16 June – Hans Kirk, author (born 1898)

=== July–September ===
- 19 August – Emilius Bangert, composer and organist (born 1883)
- 7 September – Karen Blixen, author, farmer painter (born 1885)
- 19 September – Karl Albert Hasselbalch, physician and chemist, pioneer in the use of pH measurement in medicine (born 1874)
- 28 September – Knud Kristensen, politician (born 1880)
- 30 September – Karen Lachmann, fencer (born 1916)

=== October–December ===
- 28 – Julius Lehrmann. sports shooter (died 1885)
- 18 November – Niels Bohr, theoretical physicist (born 1885)
- 29 November – Erik Scavenius, politician, Prime Minister of Denmark (born 1877)
- 7 December – Kristian Møhl, painter and decorative artist (born 1876)
- 5 December – Alsing Andersen, politician (born 1893)
- 12 December – Ellen Osiier, fencer (born 1890)
- 22 December – Max Hansen, singer, actor and comedian (born 1897)
- 24 December – Anna Henriques-Nielsen, actress (born 1881)

== See also ==
- 1962 in Danish television
