= Bjørner =

Bjørner is a Danish surname and given name. Notable people with the name include:

== Surname ==
- Dines Bjørner (born 1937), Danish computer scientist
- Gudrun Bjørner (1898–1959), Danish teacher and politician

== Given name ==
- Bjørner Drøger (1912–2003), Danish rower
