= 1958 in Denmark =

- Decades: 1930s; 1940s; 1950s; 1960s; 1970s
- See also: Other events of 1958; List of years in Denmark

Events from the year 1958 in Denmark.

== Incumbents ==
- Monarch – Frederik IX
- Prime minister – H. C. Hansen

== Sports ==
=== Badminton ===
- 19–23 March – All England Badminton Championships
  - Erland Kops wins gold in Men's Singles
  - Erland Kops and Poul-Erik Nielsen win gold in Men's Doubles

=== Date unknown ===
- Emile Severeyns (BEL) and Rik Van Steenbergen (BEL) win the Six Days of Copenhagen six-day track cycling race.

== Births ==
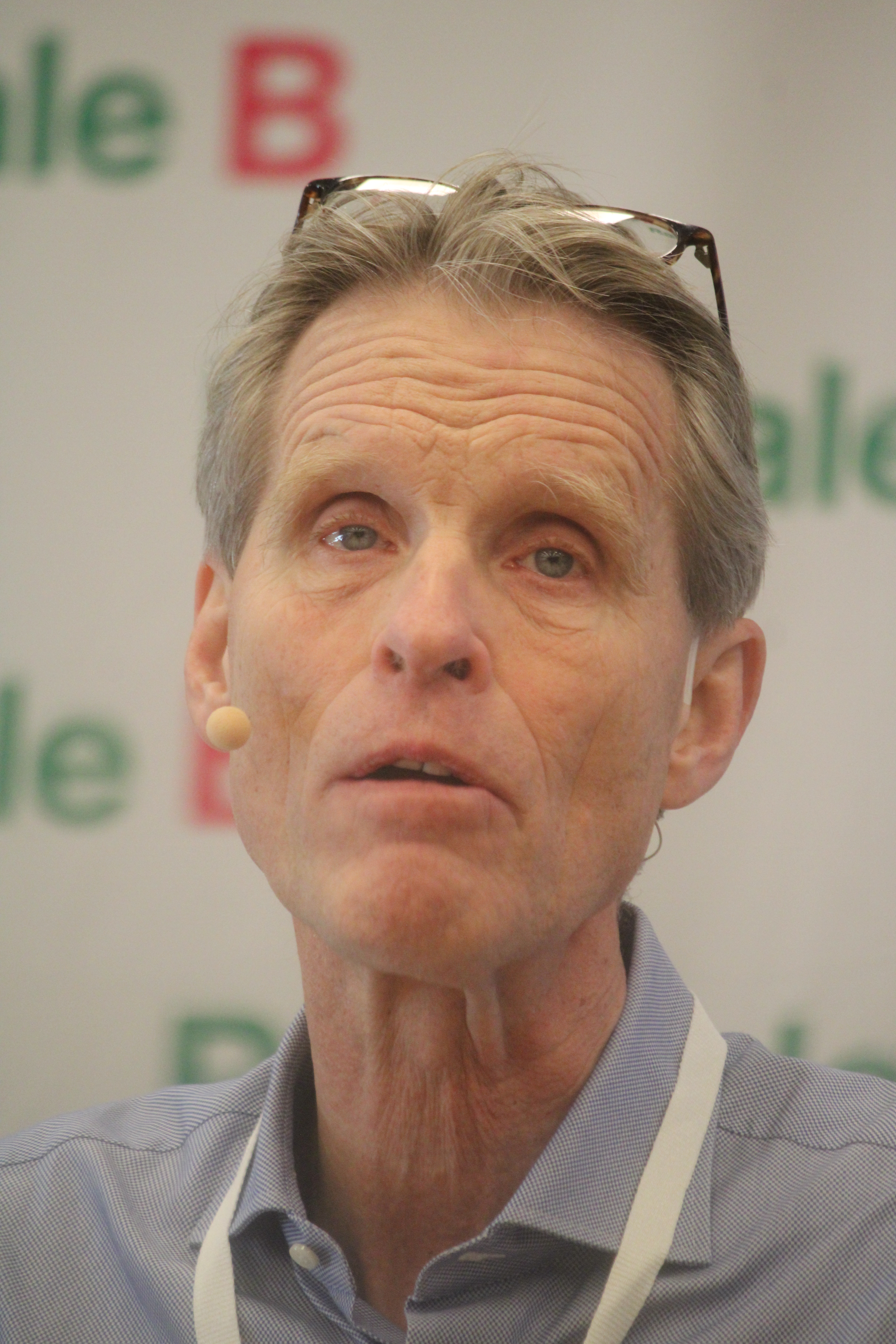
Bo Lidegaard.

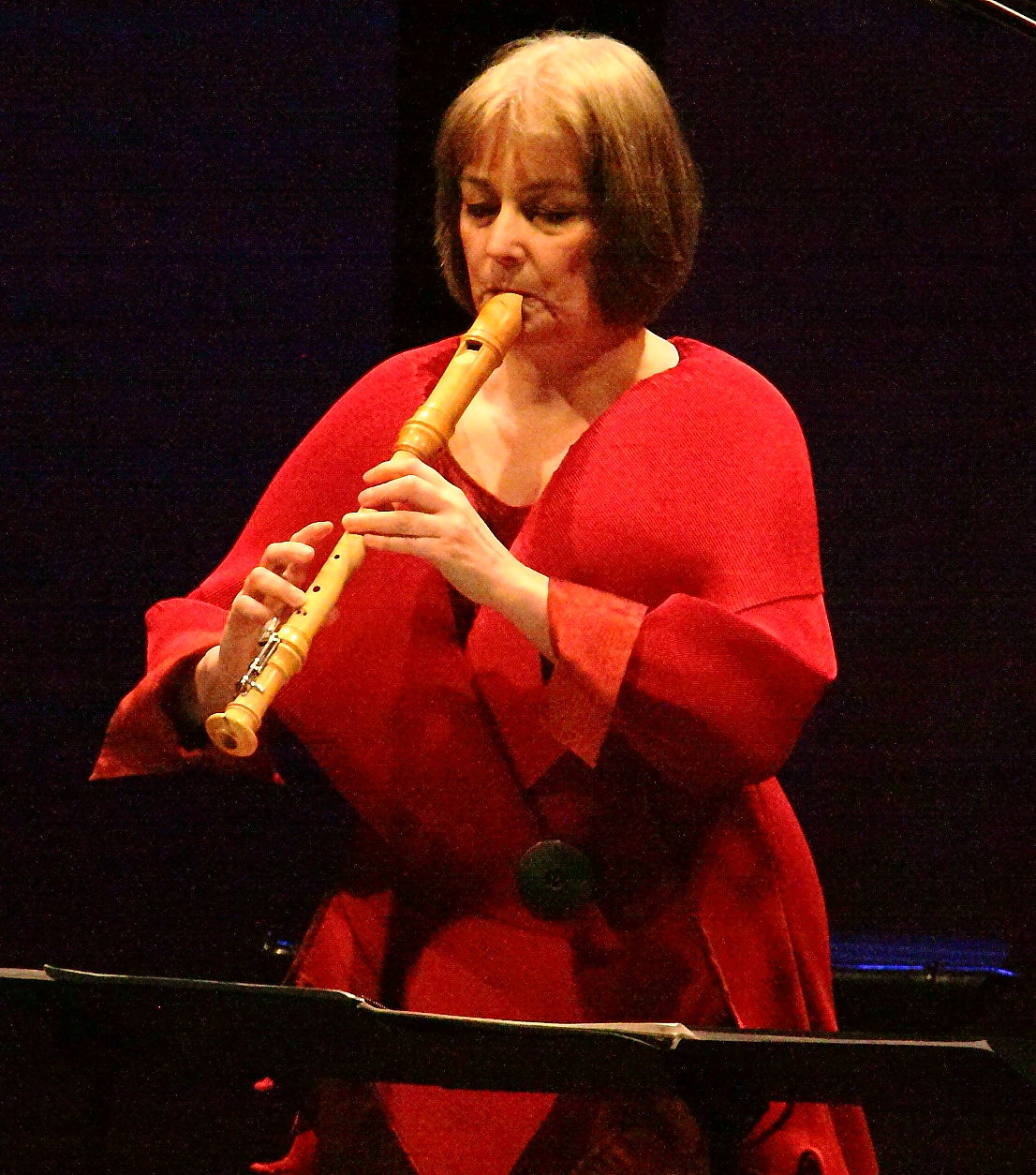
Michala Petri.

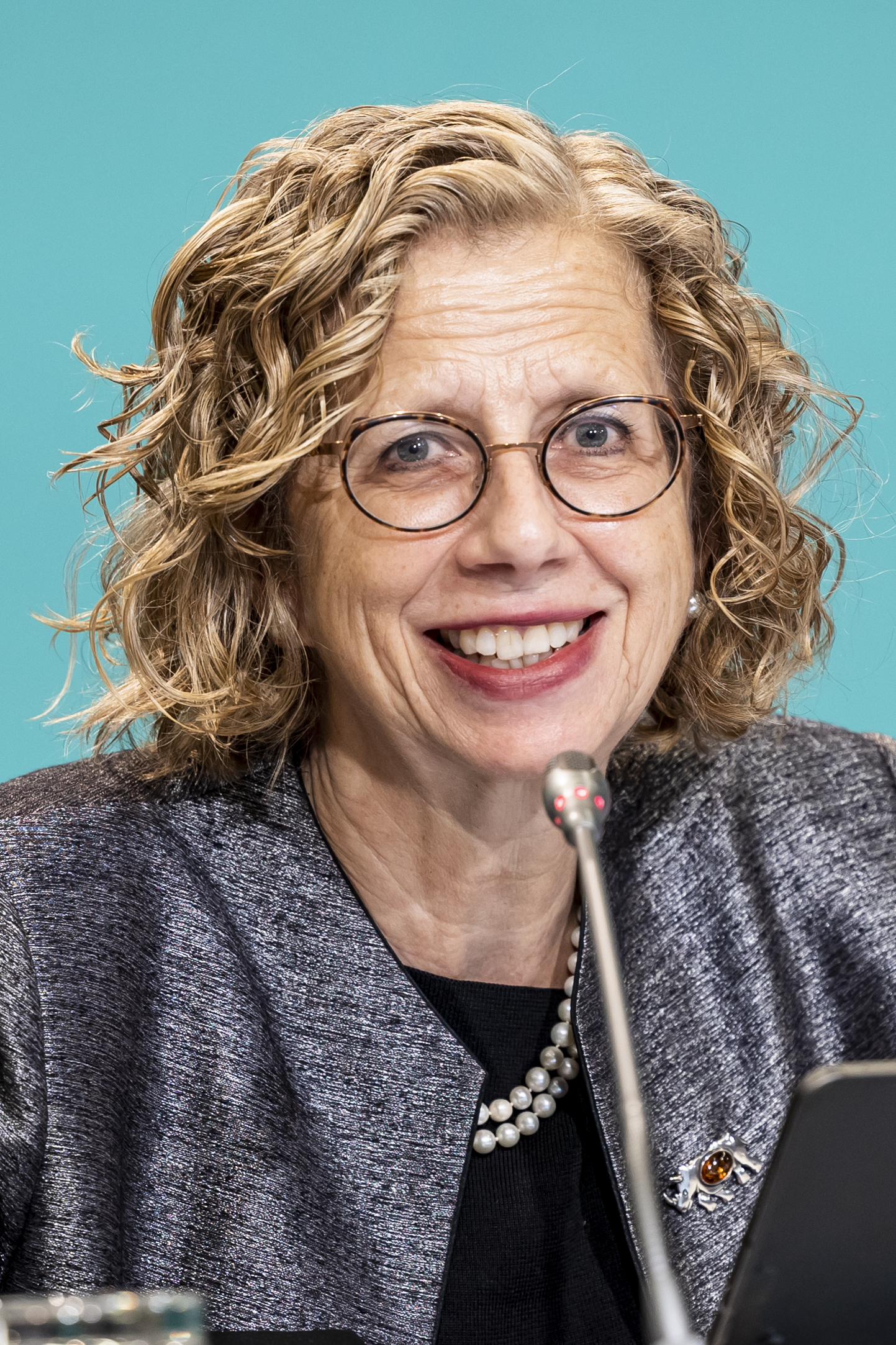
Inger Andersen.

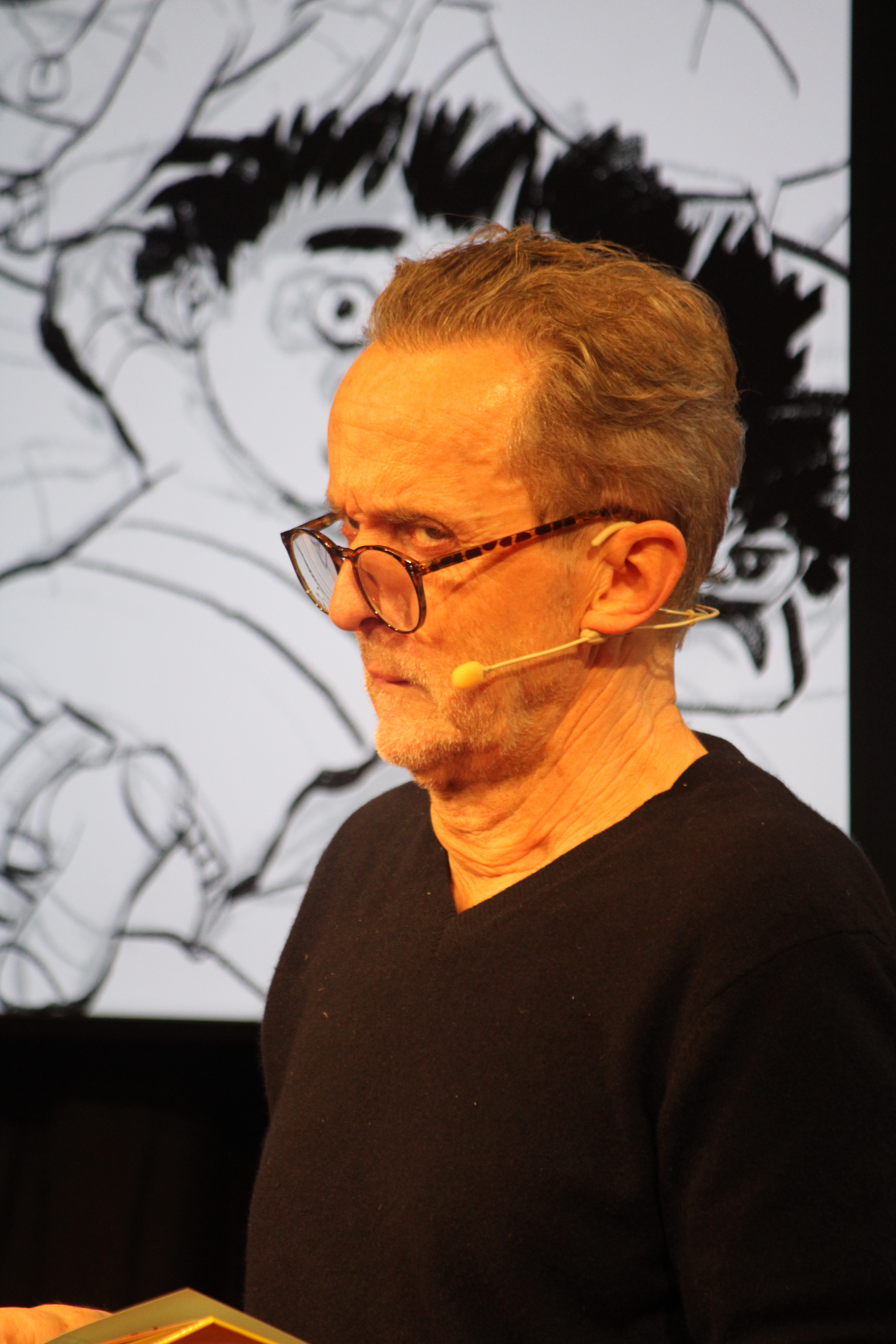
Kim Fupz Aakeson.

=== January–March ===
- 1 January – Flemming Rasmussen, record producer
- 23 January – Bo Lidegaard, historian and editor-in-chief
- 3 February – Klaus Berggreen, footballer
- 10 February – Kim Andersen, racing cyclist
- 26 March – Michael Madsen, light-heavyweight boxer
- 4 April – Morten Frost, badminton player
- 10 April – Flemming Christensen, footballer and manager

=== April–June ===
- 4 April – Morten Frost, badminton player
- 22 April – Jesper Garnell, boxer
- 26 April – Giancarlo Esposito, actor
- 3 May – Sandi Toksvig, Danish-British comedian
- 23 May – Inger Andersen, economist and environmentalist
- 12 June – Nille Juul-Sørensen, architect

=== July–September ===
- 7 July – Michala Petri, recorder player
- 11 July – Hank Shermann, artist
- 18 July – Bent Sørensen, composer
- 8 September – Dorthe Dahl-Jensen, paleoclimatologist
- 12 September – Kim Fupz Aakeson, author, screenwriter
- 14 September – Mikael Birkkjær, actor
- 24 September – Benedikte Hansen, actress
- 28 September – Peter Gantzler, actor

=== October–December ===
- 11 November – Franz-Michael Skjold Mellbin, diplomat

== Deaths ==
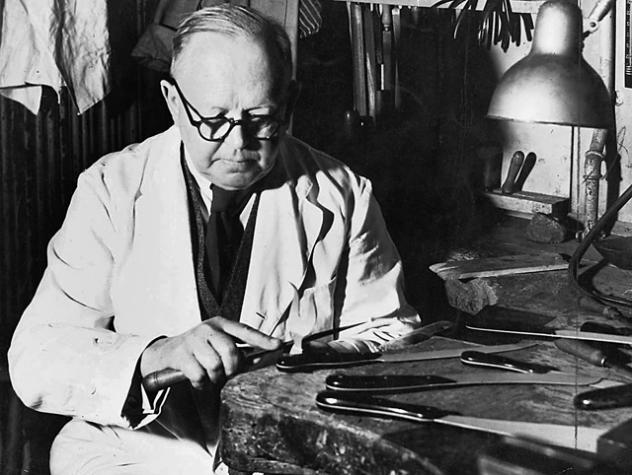
Kay Bojesen.

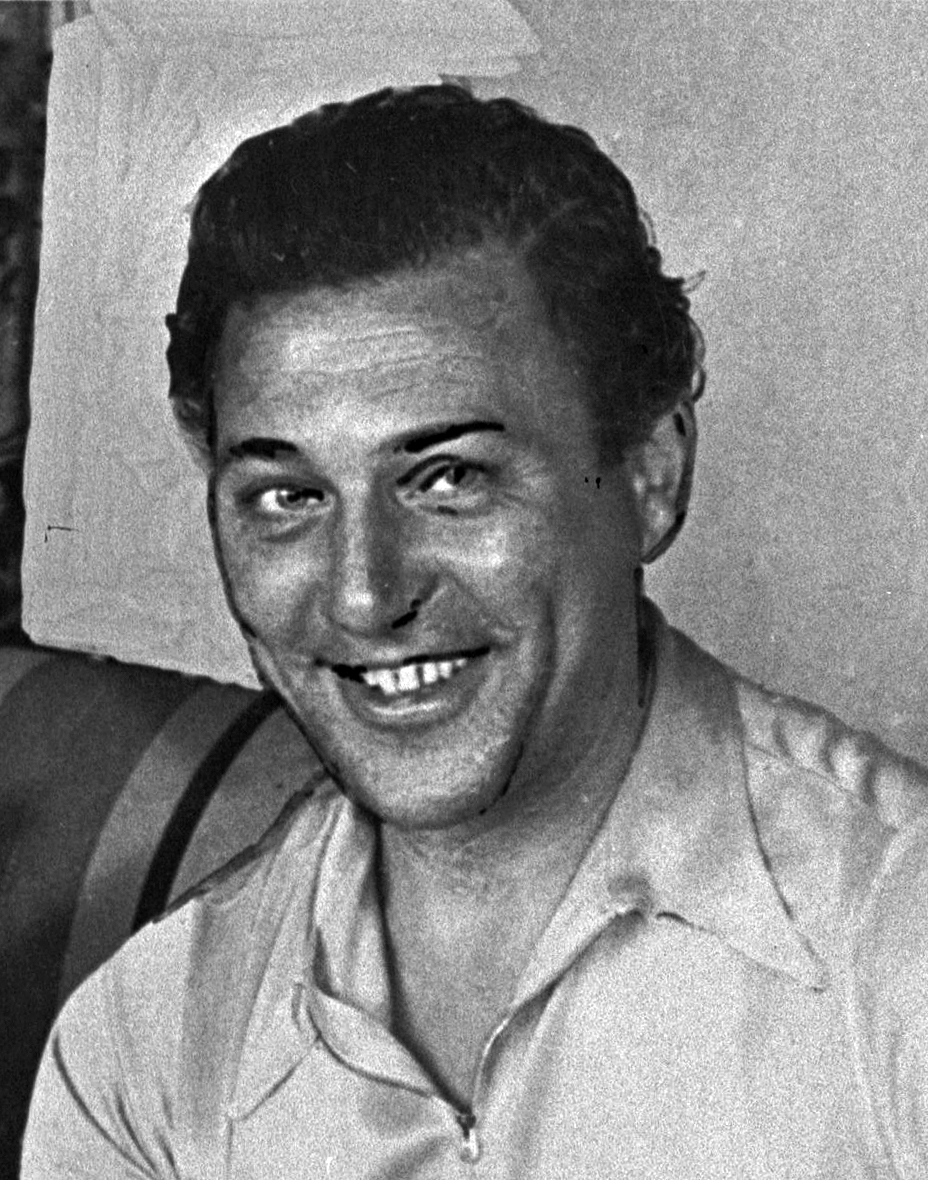
Carl Bresson.

=== January–March ===
- 11 March – Ole Kirk Christiansen, entrepreneur and businessman, inventor of Lego (born 1891)
- 3 March – Vilhelm Hvalsøe, architect (died 1883)
- 12 March – Princess Ingeborg of Denmark (born 1878)
- 14 March – Marius Lefèrve, gymnast, Olympic silver medalist in team, Swedish system, in 1912 (born 1875)

=== April–June ===
- 4 April – Jens Ferdinand Willumsen, artist (born 1863)
- 24 June – Ole Bendixen, explorer, merchant and author (born 1869)

=== July–September ===
- 5 July – Vilhelm Wolfhagen, footballer (born 1889)
- 12 July – Gudmund Schütte, philologist and historian (born 1872)
- 28 August – Kay Bojesen, silversmith and designer (born 1886)
- 18 September – William Thalbitzer, philologist, professor of Eskimo studies at the University of Copenhagen (born 1873)
- 25 September – Carl Brisson, actor (born 1893)
- 28 September – Henrik Malberg, theater and cinema actor (born 1873)

=== October–December ===
- 4 December – Emilie Demant Hatt, artist, writer and ethnographer (born 1873)

== See also ==
- 1958 in Danish television
