= 1959 in Danish television =

This is a list of Danish television related events from 1959.

== Events ==
- 12 February – Birthe Wilke is selected to represent Denmark at the 1959 Eurovision Song Contest with her song "Uh, jeg ville ønske jeg var dig". She is selected to be the third Danish Eurovision entry during Dansk Melodi Grand Prix held at the Radiohouse in Copenhagen.

== See also ==
- 1959 in Denmark
