= 1958 in Danish television =

This is a list of Danish television related events from 1958.

== Events ==
- 16 February – Raquel Rastenni is selected to represent Denmark at the 1958 Eurovision Song Contest with her song "Jeg rev et blad ud af min dagbog". She is selected to be the second Danish Eurovision entry during Dansk Melodi Grand Prix held at the Radiohouse in Copenhagen.

== Births ==
- 24 September – Benedikte Hansen, actress
- 13 November – Søs Egelind, actress & comedian

== See also ==
- 1958 in Denmark
