= 1960 in Danish television =

This is a list of Danish television related events from 1960.

== Events ==
- 6 February – Katy Bødtger is selected to represent Denmark at the 1960 Eurovision Song Contest with her song "Det var en yndig tid". She is selected to be the fourth Danish Eurovision entry during Dansk Melodi Grand Prix held at the Radiohouse in Copenhagen.

== Births ==
- 23 March – Allan Olsen, actor
- 21 May – Pernille Højmark, singer & actress
- 11 October – Michael Carøe, singer, comedian & TV host
- 8 December – Anders Frandsen, singer, actor & TV host (died 2012)

== See also ==
- 1960 in Denmark
