= 1960 in Denmark =

- Decades: 1940s; 1950s; 1960s; 1970s; 1980s
- See also: Other events of 1960; List of years in Denmark

Events from the year 1960 in Denmark.

== Incumbents ==
- Monarch – Frederik IX
- Prime minister – H. C. Hansen (until 19 February), Viggo Kampmann

== Events ==
- 15 November – The 1960 parliamentary election is held.
- 28 November – The Danish Academy is founded.

== Sports ==
=== Badminton ===
- 19–23 March – All England Badminton Championships
  - Erland Kops wins gold in Men's Single
  - Erland Kops and Poul-Erik Nielsen win gold in Men's Doubles
  - Finn Kobberø and Kirsten Thorndahl win gold medal in Mixed Doubles.

=== Date unknown ===
- Emile Severeyns (BEL) and Rik Van Steenbergen (BEL) win the Six Days of Copenhagen six-day track cycling race.

== Births ==
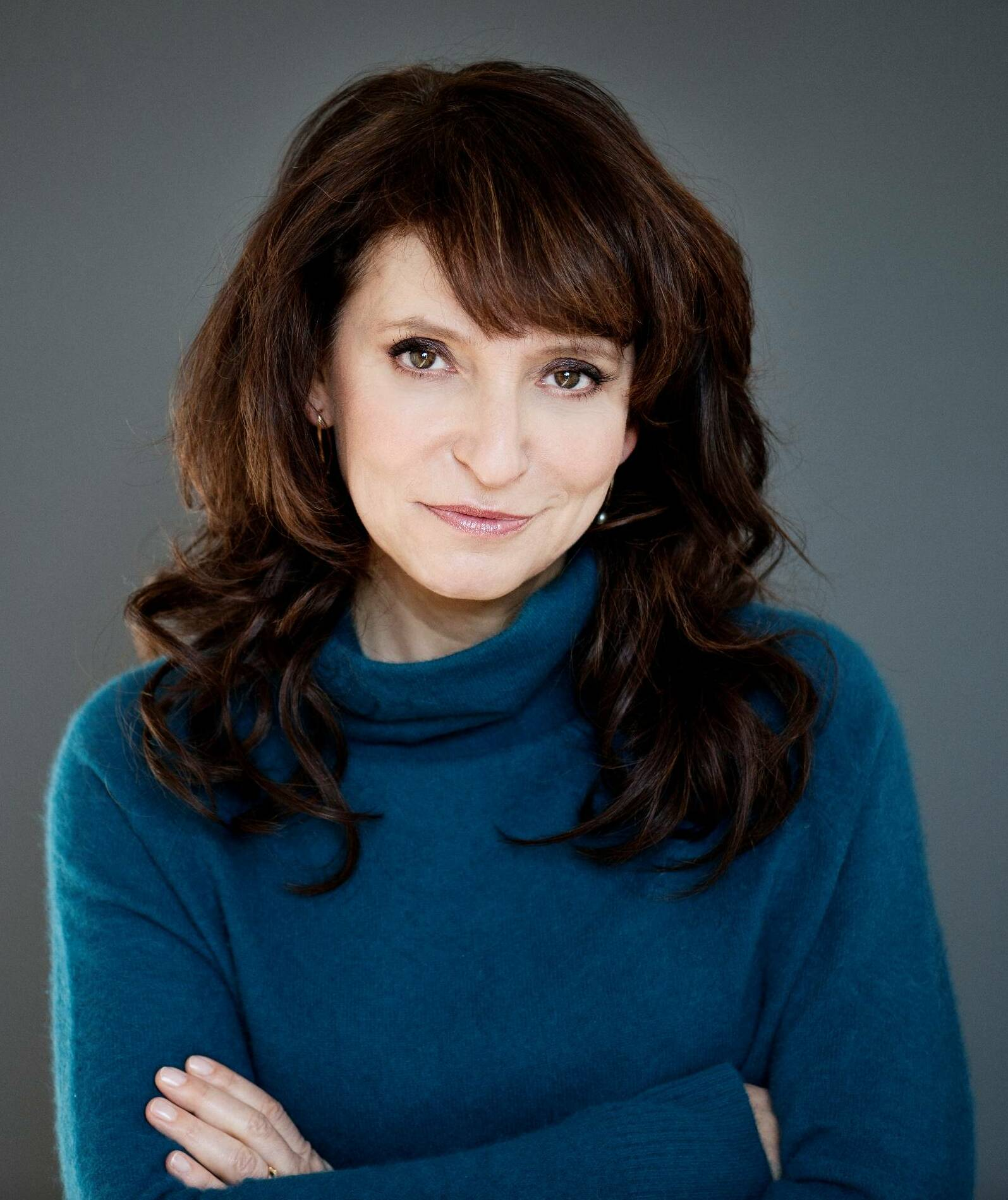
Susanne Bier.

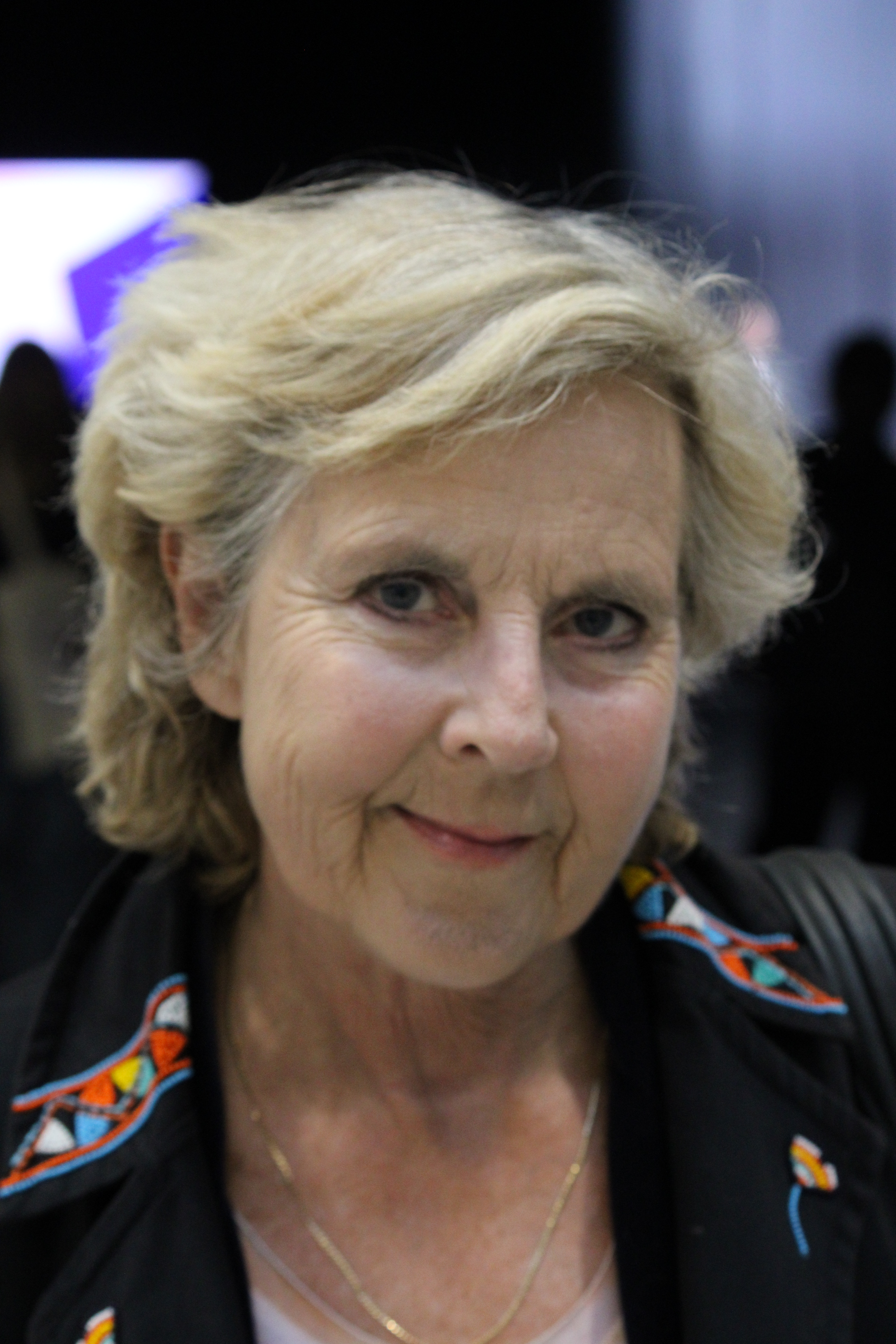
Connie Hedegaard.

=== January–March ===
- 14 January – Per Fly, film director

Ø 25 February – Joakim Garff, theologian and Søren Kierkegaard researcher

=== April–June ===
- 15 April – Susanne Bier, film director
- 11 May – Jesper Asholt, actor

=== July–September ===
- 6 July – Liselotte Plesner, civil servant and ambasador
- 8 July – Susanne Nielsson, breaststroke swimmer
- 3 August – Kim Milton Nielsen, football referee
- 10 August – Lone Gram, microbiologist
- 19 August – Morten Andersen, American-football player
- 24 August – Kim Christofte, footballer
- 15 September – Connie Hedegaard, politician and public intellectual

=== October–December ===
- 29 October – Jens Winther, jazz trumpeter (died 2011)
- 2 December – Anders Hejlsberg, software engineer

== Deaths ==
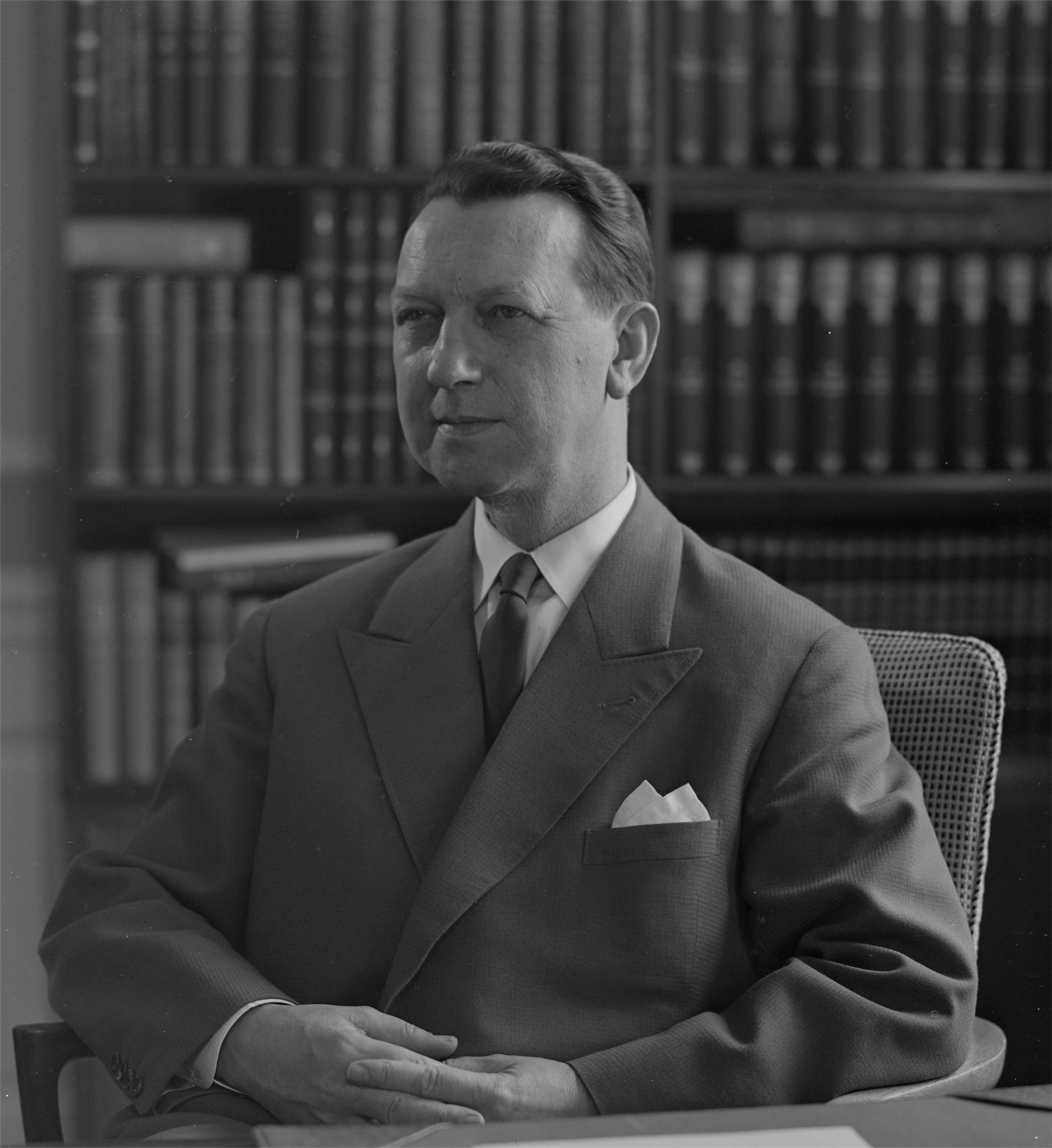
H. C. Hansen.

=== January–March ===
- 21 January – Launy Grøndahl, composer and conductor (born 1886)
- 27 January – Gudmund Hatt, archaeologist and cultural geographer (born 1884)
- 19 February – H. C. Hansen, politician and Prime Minister 1955–60 (born 1906)
- 27 March – Holger Jacobsen, architect (born 1876)

=== April–June ===
- 18 April – C. L. David, lawyer, art collector and philanthropist (born 1878)
- 24 June – Harald Moltke, nobleman, painter and author (born 1871)

=== July–September ===
- 27 July – Julie Vinter Hansen, astronomer (born 1890)
- 16 August – Christine Swane, painter associated with the "Funen Painters" (born 1876)
- 26 August – Knud Enemark Jensen, racing cyclist (born 1936)
- 1 September – Knud Heglund, actor (born 1894)
- 15 September – Else Frölich, actress (born 1880 in France)

=== October–December ===
- 4 October– Oscar Gundlach-Pedersen, architect (born 1886)
- 11 December – Svend Rindom, screenwriter and actor (born 1884)
- 12 December – Jens Peter Dahl-Jensen, sculptor and ceramist, model master of Bing & Grøndahl 1897–1917, artistic director of Norden 1917–1925 (born 1874)
- 13 December – Malvina Mehrn, animal rights activist (born 1862).
- 22 December – Sophus Black, telegraph manager and art collector (born 1882)

== See also ==
- 1960 in Danish television
