= 1962 in Danish television =

This is a list of Danish television related events from 1962.

== Events ==
- 11 February – Ellen Winther is selected to represent Denmark at the 1962 Eurovision Song Contest with her song "Vuggevise". She is selected to be the sixth Danish Eurovision entry during Dansk Melodi Grand Prix held at the Tivolis Koncertsal in Copenhagen.

== Births ==
- 1 November – Hella Joof, actress, comedian & director

== See also ==
- 1962 in Denmark
