= Rikard Magnussen =

Danish sculptor (1885–1948)

Rikard Magnussen (2 April 1885 – 26 May 1948) was a Danish sculptor and writer.

== Early life and education ==
Magnussen was born on 2 April 1885 in Copenhagen, the son of bookkeeper Sophus Oscar Magnussen (1849–1926) and Christiane Marie Weybøll (1853–1930). He completed his schooling in 1903. He was then trained as a sculptor, first for eight months under Elna Borch in 1904 and then under Stephan Sinding. He later worked on an off for Vilhelm Bissen 1913.

== Career ==
Magnussen was a strong defender of the naturalistic style at a time when modernism came to play a still more dominant role on the art scene.

He was a member of Charlottenborg's censor committee and a board member both of Dansk Billedhugger Samfund, Kunstforeningen af 18. November and Foreningen for National Kunst, He was an art critic at København (1920–26), Nationaltidende and other newspapers. He was a member of Foreningen til Hovedstadens Forskønnelse in 1928–42 and served as its president in 1929–34.

His writings included his memoirs Billedhugger-Minder (1933), monographies about Janus la Cour (1928), Carl Bloch (1931), Christian Molsted (1935), Svend Hammershøi (b. 1936) and Godfred Christensen (I-II, 1939–41) as well as I Thorvaldsens Livsanskuelse (1936) about Bertel Thorvaldsen and Søren Kierkegaard set udefra (1942). He was editor of National Kunst (1940) and Danmarks nationale Malerkunst (1941).

== Personal life ==
Magnussen married royal translator Ellen Reck (6 May 1879 – 9 January 1956), a daughter of military officer and businessman Anders Borch R. (1850–1927) and Marie Johanne Jacobine Qvist (1854–1927), on 10 July 1912 in Hellerup. He was made a Knight in the Order of the Dannebrog in 1938. He died on 26 May 1948 in Copenhagen and is buried in the city's Western Cemetery.

== List of works ==
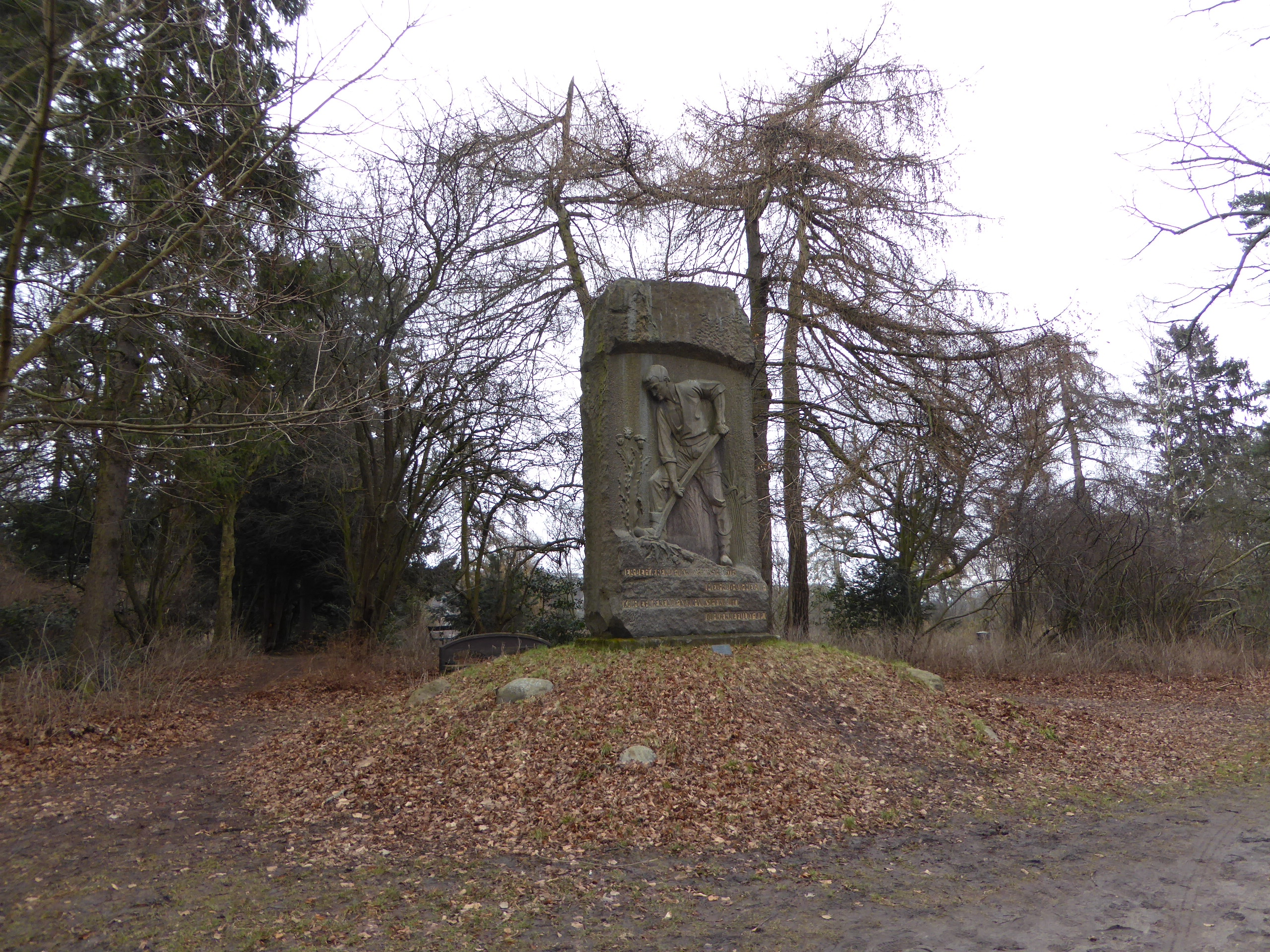
Ole Syversen Monument, Copenhagen

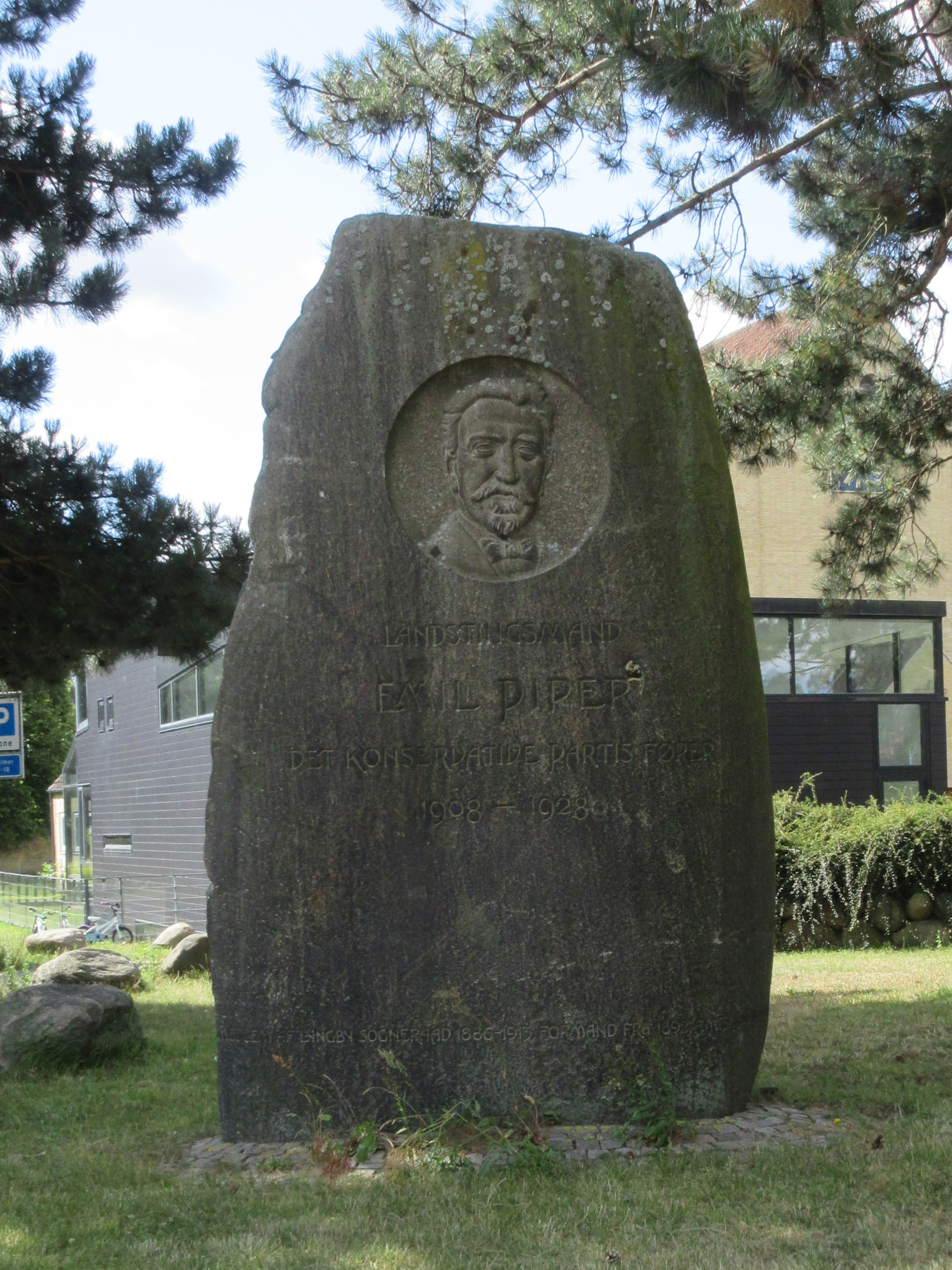
Emil Piper Memorial, Ltngby

- Munken og evighedsfuglen (gips, uexhibited 1908)
- Martin Luther (plaster, 1915)
- Den gode Hyrde (plaster, 1919)
- Pygmalion og Galathea (exhibited 1919)

=== Public art, monuments and memorials ===
- Ole Syversen Monument, Fælledparken, Copenhagen
- Frederik Ditlev Reventlow, Horslunde (1017)
- Emil Piper Memorial, Kongens Lyngby (1928)
- Sophie Magdalene, Hørsholm Slotspark, Hørsholm (1932)
- Frederik VIII and Louise, Charlottenlund Slotspark, Charlottenlund (1938)
- Christian, Count Moltke, Vallø Castle Park (1942)

=== Portrait busts ===
- Jacob Texière (plaster, 1907)
- Juliette Price (1910, marble, Royal Danish Theatre)
- Th. Skat Rørdam (plaster, 1911–12)
- August Krogh (1918, bronze, Zoological Laboratory, University of Copenhagen)
- C.A. Olesen (1921, bronze, Danish Distillers)
- Harald Kidde (plaster, 1925)
- Søren Kierkegaard (1929)
