= Poul Lange =

Danish artist and designer (born 1956)

- Born: Poul Hans Thye Lange; 16 September 1956 (age 69); Frederiksberg, Denmark
- Education: BFA from The Danish Design School (Danmarks Designskole), Copenhagen 1983; Special Student, School of Visual Arts, New York, 1984
- Known for: Illustration, graphic design, photography, art photography, children's books
- Notable work: The Book of Holes (in Danish Hullebogen) 2006; The Book of Holes app, 2013.
- Awards: AIGA, the American Institute of Graphic Arts; Communication Arts; Art Directors Club NY; Art Directors Club, Los Angeles; First place, International Photography Awards; New York Art Directors Club; AI-AP, American Illustration, American Photography; The American Scandinavian Society

Poul Lange, also known as Poul Hans Lange, (born 1956, Copenhagen) is a Danish illustrator, graphic designer, photographer, fine artist and children's book creator, who has won numerous awards for his design work. Since the early 1990s, he has lived and worked in the United States, first in New York City, and then after 2012 in Los Angeles. In 2011 Lange founded "Chocolate Factory Publishing" with his wife Kayoko Suzuki-Lange. In 2013, Chocolate Factory Publishing released the award-winning children's book app, The Book of Holes.

Over the years, Lange has designed hundreds of book jackets and created hundreds of illustrations for print media. His design work also includes editorial design. Collage forms an important part of his design and fine art work. A children's book that Lange created was published in 2004. Lange has taught design in New York City and in Copenhagen.

Lange's bio is in "Kraks Blå Bog", the Danish Who's Who, which commenced publication in 1910.

== Early years ==
Lange was born in Frederiksberg, an enclave within the municipality of Copenhagen, in 1956. He attended the Danmarks Designskole from 1980 to 1983, and graduated as a BFA with honors.

== New York ==
Lange traveled to New York City in 1984 to study at the New York School of Visual Arts. After graduation he returned to Copenhagen and worked as a designer from 1985 to 1989.

In 1989 he moved back to New York to work with the designers Walter Bernard and Milton Glaser at their company WBMG, a publication design firm.

In 1991, Lange started his own design firm, "Poul Lange Design".

== Los Angeles ==
In September 2012, Lange and his wife Kayoko Suzuki-Lange moved to Los Angeles and founded "Chocolate Factory Publishing", which specializes in children's book apps, including the award-winning app for the iPad, The Book of Holes.

== His work ==
=== Book covers ===
Over the years, Lange has designed many hundreds (if not thousands) of book jackets, mostly for Danish publishers.

=== Illustration ===
Lange's illustrations have appeared in many major US publications, including Time magazine, the New York Times, Washington Post, GQ, and the Boston Globe.

In 2013, a book of historical cocktail recipes called Storied Sips was published, written by Erica Duecy and illustrated with collages, drink photographs and calligraphy by Poul Lange.

=== Children's book author and creator ===
Lange's first book for children is Hullebogen, known in English as The Book of Holes. An actual hole runs right through the book itself and forms the centerpiece of all the illustrations. Lange conceptualized, wrote, illustrated, and designed the book, which is published by Gyldendal, the Danish publishing house. The book has been available in the Danish edition since 2006; an English edition is planned. The book won an AIGA award in 2006; one juror wrote: "A die-cut hole through the entire book is the focus of this children’s book about the holes in our bodies. Honest presentation of information is enhanced by whimsical drawing."

In 2010, Lange was working on a children's book, Big Long Lulu, with American novelist Siri Hustvedt. He was also working on another children's book, Little Hand, with the Danish poet and writer, Naja Marie Aidt.

In 2012, his website showed an ABC book, a collaboration with Annette Lindegaard, Hele verdens ABC.

=== Children's book apps ===
In 2013, a digital interactive English language version of Lange's children's book, The Book of Holes was released by Chocolate Factory Publications as an app for the iPad.

The Book of Holes app was awarded a Kirkus Star, given in 2013 to "Books of Exceptional Merit" in the "Best Book Apps Of 2013" awarded by Kirkus Reviews. The app was described as "Educational and entertaining—and tailor-made to spark stimulating interchanges between younger children and unwary grown-ups. (iPad informational app. 2–5)". The Kirkus Reviews called it "An airy introduction to holes of, mostly, the anatomical sort with touch-activated effects that run the scale from whimsical to hilariously edgy."

=== Fine art ===
Lange has had several solo and group exhibitions as a collage artist. He is also known for his photography.

=== Teaching ===
Lange has taught design in New York City and in Copenhagen:

- On the faculty at SVA, illustration and graphic design, 2009.
- Courses at the Danish Design School in Copenhagen
- Courses at the Mediehøjskolen, the Danish School of Media and Journalism, in Copenhagen
