= Kay Bojesen =

Danish silversmith and designer

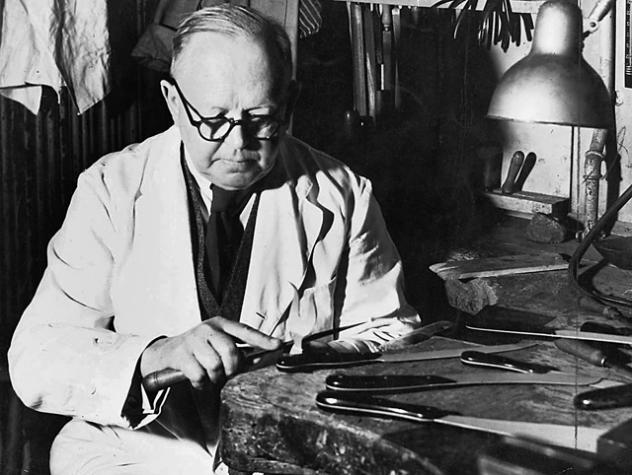
- Kay Bojesen in his studio
- Born: 15 August 1886; Copenhagen, Denmark
- Died: 28 August 1958 (aged 72); Gentofte, Denmark
- Occupation: Designer
- Known for: Wooden animals
- Spouse: Erna Bojesen

Kay Bojesen (15 August 1886 – 28 August 1958) was a Danish silversmith and designer. He is best known for creating wooden animals, especially his wooden monkey which was exhibited at the Victoria and Albert museum in London in the nineteen-fifties, and which today is considered a design classic.

== Early life and education ==
Bojesen was born on 15 August 1886 in Copenhagen, Denmark. He first trained to be a grocer, but in 1906 began working for Danish silversmith Georg Jensen. The Danish Museum of Art & Design describes his early work as being in an Art Nouveau style, likely due to Jensen's influence.

== Career ==
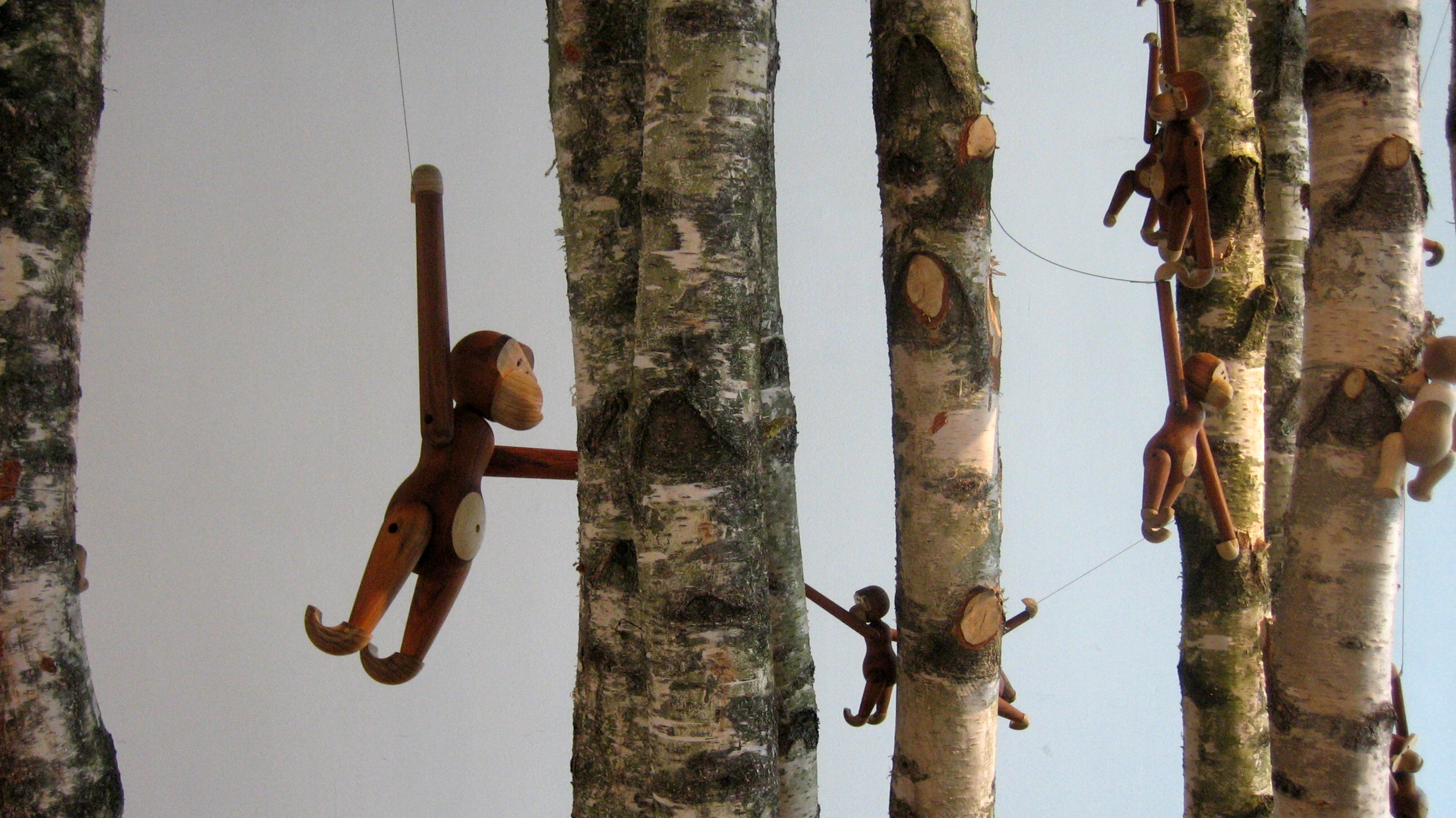
Bojesen's wooden monkey at the Danish Design Centre in Copenhagen

In 1922, Bojesen began designing wooden toys, typically about six to ten inches tall, with moveable limbs. These included a teak and limba monkey (1951), an oak elephant, a bear made of oak and maple, a rocking horse of beech, a parrot, a dachshund, and toy soldiers of the Danish Royal Guard including a drummer, a private with rifle and a standard-bearer. In 1990, Danish design house Rosendahl bought the rights to the toys.

In 1931, Bojesen was one of the key founders of the design exhibition gallery and shop called "Den Permanente" (The Permanent), a collective which aimed to exhibit the best of Danish design.

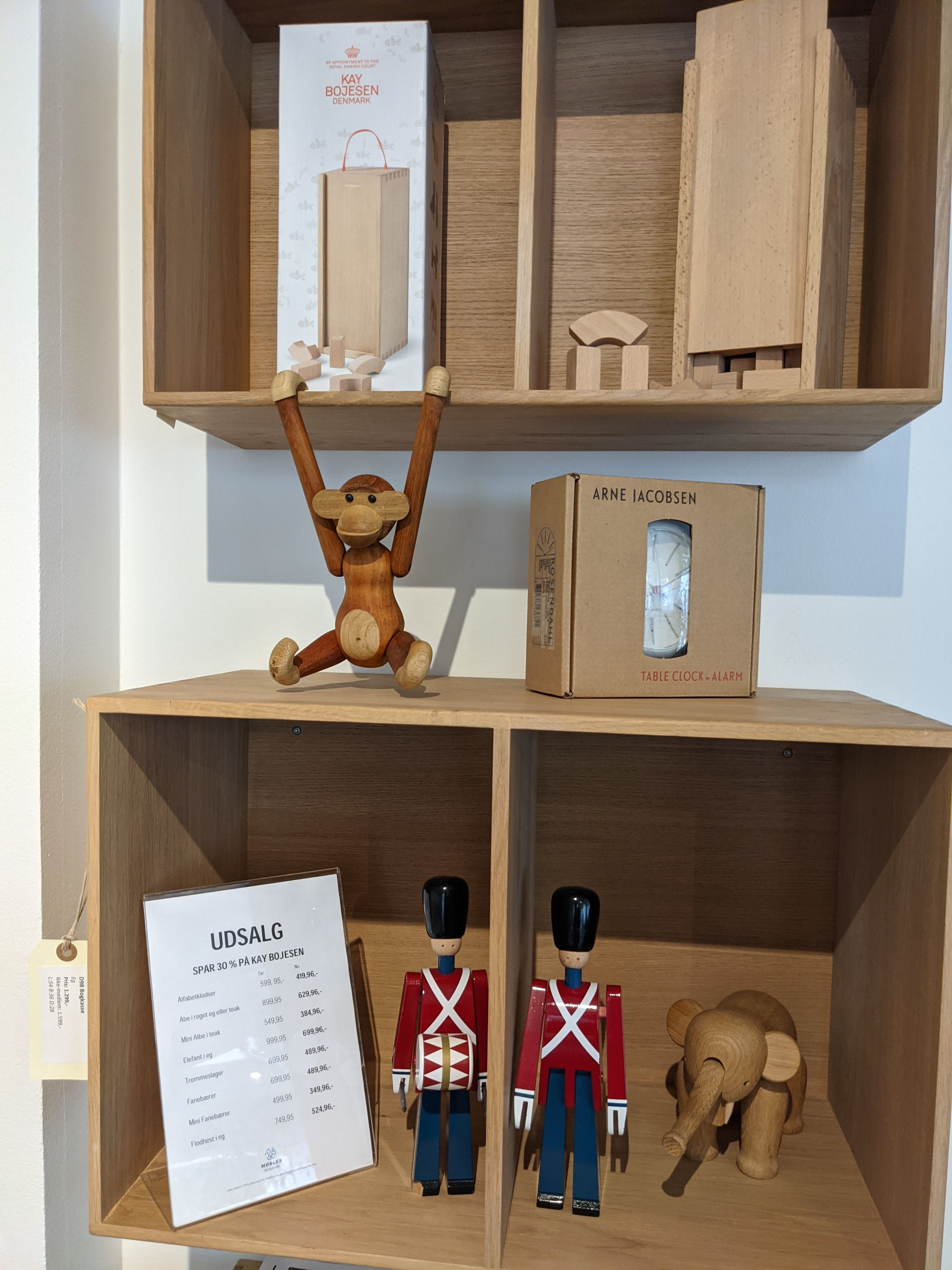
Kay Bojesen toys for sale

Bojesen also designed furniture for children, jewellery and housewares. A set of stainless steel cutlery he designed in 1938 won the Grand Prix at the Milan Triennial IX of 1951, after which Bojesen named the set “Grand Prix.” Today, the Grand Prix cutlery has been relaunched and is being manufactured by Kay Bojesen's granddaughter, Susanne Bojesen Rosenqvist. The Grand Prix is known as the national cutlery of Denmark and is to be found in every Danish Embassy worldwide.

== Legacy ==
Bojesen died on 28 August 1958, at the age of 72. His shop in Copenhagen, which he founded in 1932, operated until the nineteen-eighties. Following his death it was continued by his widow Erna Bojesen until her death in 1986.

Bojesen was an honorary member of the National Association of Danish Arts and Crafts, and was recognized for his toys by the Danish National Committee of the OEMP (World Organisation for Early Childhood Education).
