= Birgitte Bonnesen =

Danish-Swedish business leader

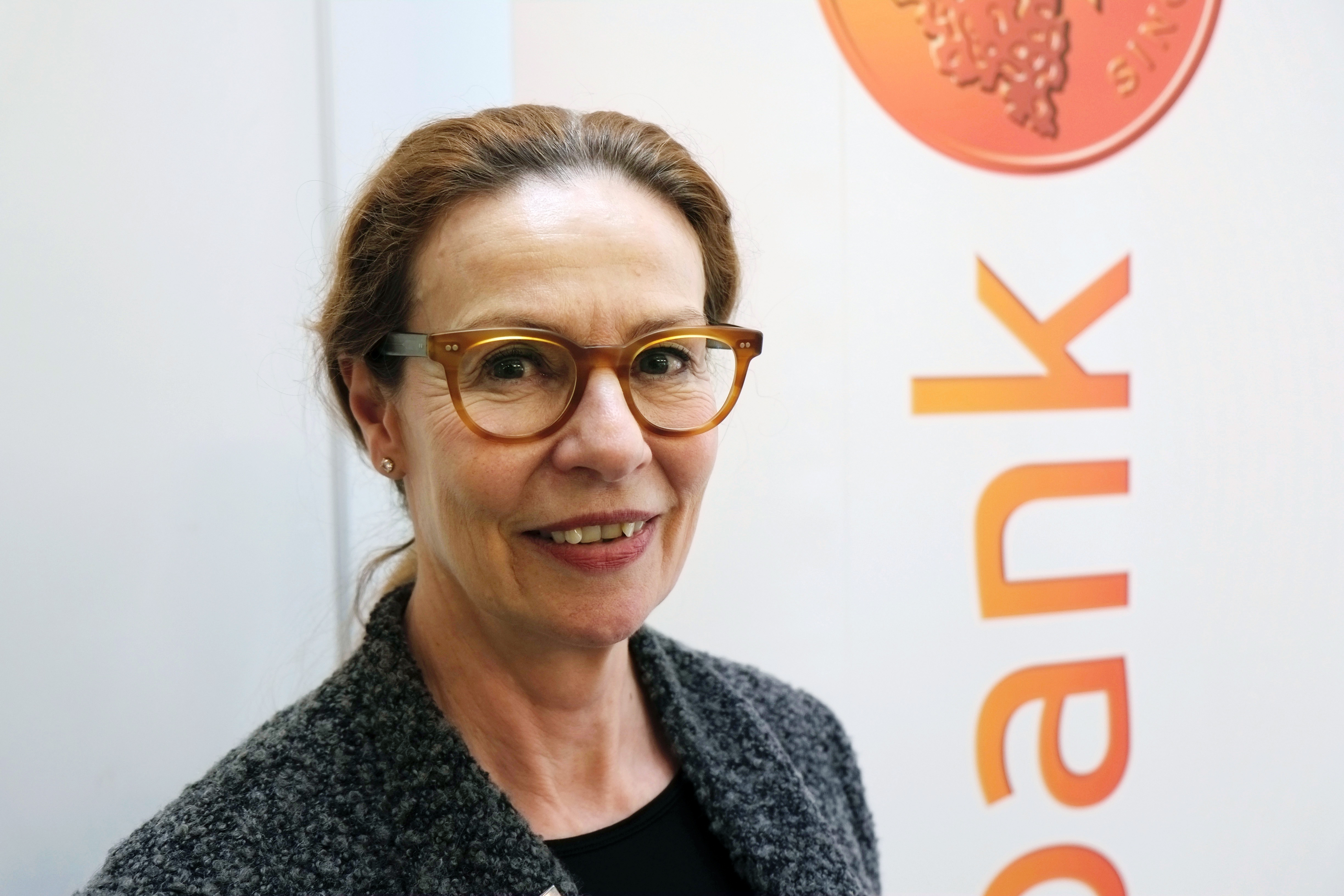
- Birgitte Bonnesen, 2019
- Born: May 18, 1956 (age 69); Odder, Denmark
- Occupation: Banker
- Known for: CEO of Swedbank (2016–2019)

Birgitte Bonnesen (born 18 May 1956) is a Danish-Swedish former business executive. She was the chief executive officer (CEO) of Swedbank from 2016 to 2019 and was chairperson of the Swedish Bankers' Association from 2017 to 2019.

== Early life and education ==
Birgitte Bonnesen is the daughter of merchant Sven Bonnesen and entrepreneur Birte Bonnesen. She grew up in Jutland, Denmark. From 1979 to 1985, she studied economics, English, and French at Aarhus University, earning a master's degree in 1985.

== Career ==
She moved to Sweden in 1987 and began working at Första Sparbanken (First Savings Bank), which later became Swedbank. From 2009 to 2011, she was head of the bank's internal audit. Between 2011 and 2014, she was head of Swedbank's operations in Estonia, Latvia, and Lithuania. In 2015, she became head of the bank's Swedish operations. She served as CEO of Swedbank from 2016 to 2019.

=== Departure in 2019 and legal aftermath ===
In the autumn of 2018, Bonnesen assured that Swedbank did not have foreign customers in the Baltics who merely transferred money through the bank. However, following an investigative report by the Swedish television program Uppdrag granskning on 20 February 2019, which examined Swedbank's Baltic customers during previous years, Bonnesen's earlier statements were questioned, and she was forced to step down on the morning of the annual general meeting on 28 March 2019.

She also left her position as chairperson of the Swedish Bankers' Association when she was dismissed as CEO of Swedbank.

On 23 March 2020, Swedbank announced that its board had decided to unilaterally revoke Bonnesen's severance agreement. According to the bank's annual report, she was to receive severance pay of 18 months' salary, approximately 21.5 million SEK.

Chief prosecutor Thomas Langrot at the Swedish Economic Crime Authority decided on 4 January 2022 to indict Bonnesen for gross fraud, alternatively gross market manipulation. The indictment concerned Bonnesen's statements during 2018 and 2019 about the bank's work against money laundering in the Baltics. The prosecutor alleged that Bonnesen had intentionally or through gross negligence spread misleading information that affected investors' assessment of the company. This was the first time a former CEO of one of the Swedish major banks was indicted for crimes committed in office. The prosecutor requested a two-year prison sentence during the district court proceedings, but on 25 January 2023, Bonnesen was acquitted on all charges by the Stockholm District Court.

The verdict was appealed, and on 10 September 2024, the Svea Court of Appeal sentenced Bonnesen to one year and three months in prison for gross fraud. She was acquitted of the charges in other parts.
