= Foss A/S =

Danish agricultural technology company

FOSS A/S
- Type: Private limited company
- Industry: Technology
- Founded: 1956
- Founder: Nils Foss
- Headquarters: Hillerød, Denmark
- Key people: Christian Rosenkrantz de Lasson(CEO), Peter Foss (Chairman)
- Revenue: DKK 2,730 million (2025)
- Net income: DKK 504 million
- Number of employees: 1,750 (2026))
- Website: fossanalytics.com iqx.net

FOSS is a global provider of high-tech analytical solutions used mainly in the agricultural and food industries. The company is headquartered in Hillerød, Denmark.

== History ==
FOSS was founded by Nils Foss in 1956, as N. Foss Electric A/S. The first products were instruments used in the testing of moisture in grain. They were followed by analytical solutions for the dairy industry. In 1997, FOSS acquired Perstorp Analytical AB with the subsidiaries Tecator AB and NIRSystems Inc.

Nils Foss was CEO of the company until 1990, when the position was taken over by his son Peter Foss. In 2011, Torben Ladegaard was appointed to CEO while Peter Foss became chairman of the company. Ladegaard was succeeded by Kim Vejlby Hansen as CEO in 2016. In March 2026, Kim Vejby Hansen was replaced by Christian Rosenkrantz de Lasson, who had been with FOSS since 2015.

== Operations ==
FOSS is headquartered in Hillerød where a new Foss Innovation Centre was inaugurated in 2014. The company has approximately 1,750 employees and sales offices in 34 countries.
