= Julius Lehrmann =

Danish sports shooter (1885–1962)

Personal information
- Born: 23 October 1885 Syddanmark, Denmark
- Died: 28 October 1962 (aged 77) Syddanmark, Denmark

Sport
- Sport: Sports shooting

Julius Lehrmann (23 October 1885 – 28 October 1962) was a Danish sports shooter. He competed in the 50 m pistol event at the 1936 Summer Olympics.
