= Daniel Andersen =

Danish composer, and sculptor (1885–1959)

Daniel Andersen (25 November 1885 – 30 April 1959) was a Danish composer, sculptor, and ceramist. He studied music in Vienna; among his compositions are a handful of religious works and an opera, Madonnas Ansigt.
