= Gudrun Bjørner =

Danish teacher and politician (1898–1959)

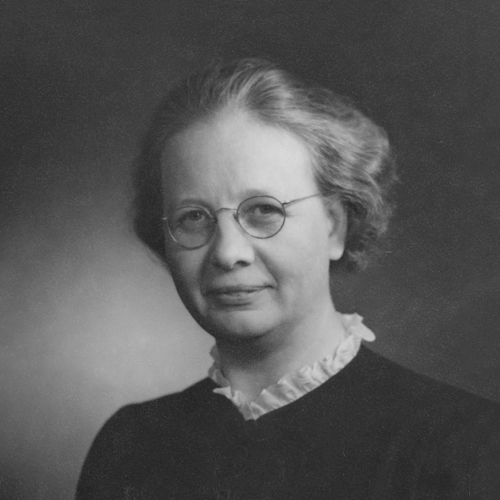
- Bjørner c. 1958

Member of the Folketing for the Eastern constituency
- In office 21 March 1958 – 19 August 1959 (Note: On sick leave from 22 October 1958 until 19 August 1959.)
- Preceded by: Knud Tholstrup
- Succeeded by: Robert Sandau
- In office 2 October 1957 – 20 March 1958 (substitute); 18 May 1948 – 27 June 1948 (substitute)

Member of the Copenhagen City Council
- In office 1950–1959 (Note: Resigned sometime before her death on 19 August 1959.)

Personal details
- Born: 29 October 1898 Copenhagen, Denmark
- Died: 19 August 1959 (aged 60)
- Party: Justice Party

Gudrun Marie Elisabeth Bjørner (29 October 1898 – 19 August 1959) was a Danish teacher and politician who served in the Folketing from 1958 until 1959. A member of the Justice Party, she was also a member of the Copenhagen City Council and was a prominent Georgist activist.

== Biography ==
Gudrun Marie Elisabeth Bjørner was born on 29 October 1898 in Copenhagen, Denmark. Her father was Johannes Lauritz Bjørner, a wholesaler and prominent Georgist activist, and her mother was the editor Signe Bjørner. She completed her teacher's examination from the Gedved Seminary in 1922, and became a municipal teacher in Copenhagen in 1927. She would eventually become a head teacher (Overlærer) in 1952.

Like her father, Bjørner became a prominent member of the Georgist movement in Denmark. She became a member of the Justice Party's board of directors in 1929, and was an unsuccessful candidate for the Folketing in 1926, 1939, and 1943. From May until June 1948, Bjørner was a substitute member of parliament for Knud Tholstrup. She was also a public speaker and writer, and was an editor for the Georgist magazine Grundskyld. Her brother Bue Bjørner was a Justice Party MP from 1947 until 1950.

In 1950, Bjørner was elected to the Copenhagen City Council. Georgist writer Peder C. Pedersen considers this to have been her most influential position, stating that her outspokenness against the status quo was a testament to her "firm conviction". During her tenure on the city council, Bjørner was an advocate for the creation of a welfare state particularly for the elderly.

Bjørner became a substitute MP again in October 1957 when Tholstrup took a leave of absence. She was a substitute member until 20 March 1958, when Tholstrup resigned from parliament citing increased difficulty sitting in parliament while running his business. The following day, Bjørner became a full member of parliament, representing the Eastern constituency as a member of the Justice Party. Due to poor health, she went on sick leave beginning on 22 October 1958. She resigned her seat on the city council sometime in 1959 due to illness, but retained her seat in parliament.

Bjørner died on 19 August 1959. She was succeeded in parliament by Robert Sandau. Though the Justice Party won nine seats in parliament in the 1957 election, the party was devastated by the deaths and resignations of several of its veteran MPs and it failed to recover in the years after.
