= Thott Mansion =

Mansion in Copenhagen, Denmark

- Thotts Palæ
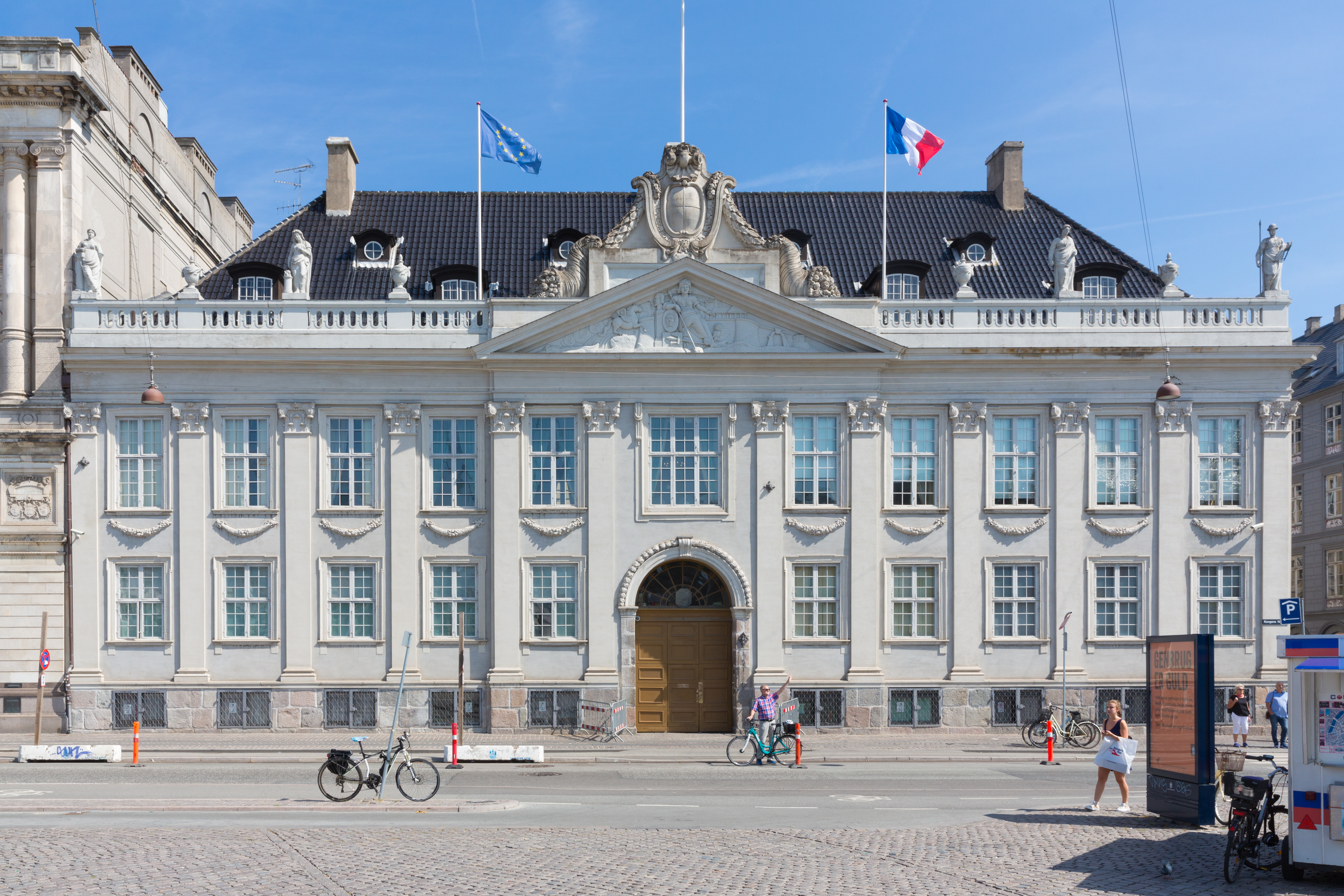
- Thott Mansion seen from the square
- Interactive map of the Thott Mansion area

General information
- Architectural style: Neoclassical
- Location: Copenhagen, Denmark
- Coordinates: 55°40′52″N 12°35′14″E
- Construction started: 1683
- Completed: 1686
- Client: Niels Juel
- Owner: State of France

Design and construction
- Architect: Nicolas-Henri Jardin

The Thott Mansion (Danish: Thotts Palæ) is a listed town mansion located on Kongens Nytorv in Copenhagen, Denmark. It was built for the naval officer Niels Juel in the 1680s but his Baroque mansion was later adapted to the Neoclassical style by the French architect Nicolas-Henri Jardin in 1763. The building takes its current name from the Thott family, who owned it from 1750 to 1930. It now houses the French embassy.

== History ==
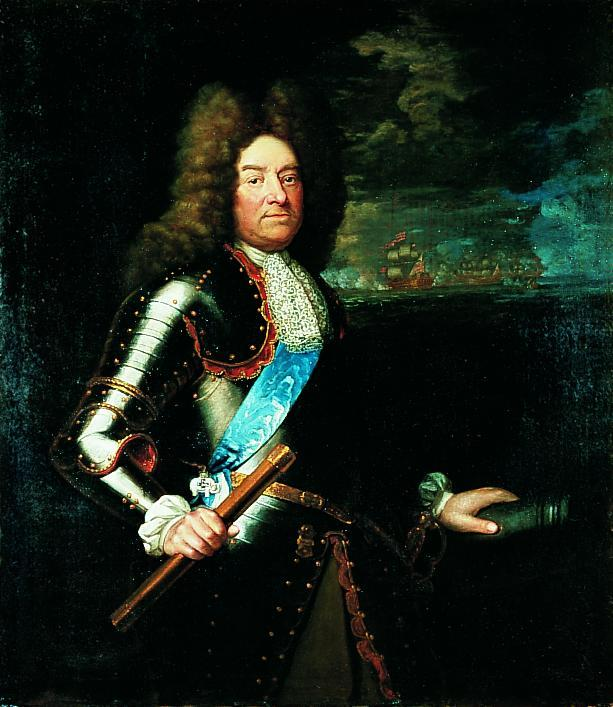
Niels Juel, painted by Jacob Coning

=== Niels Juel's mansion ===
Originally known as the Juel Mansion, the house was built from 1683 to 1686 for the Danish naval officer Niels Juel. It was the second building which was completed on Kongens Nytorv which had been laid out by Christian V of Denmark in the years following his coronation in 1670 inspired by the royal squares of Paris. Niels Juel's victory in the Battle of Køge Bay had won him fame and wealth. His new mansion was designed by Lambert van Haven as an L-shaped building in the Dutch Baroque style.

=== The next owners ===
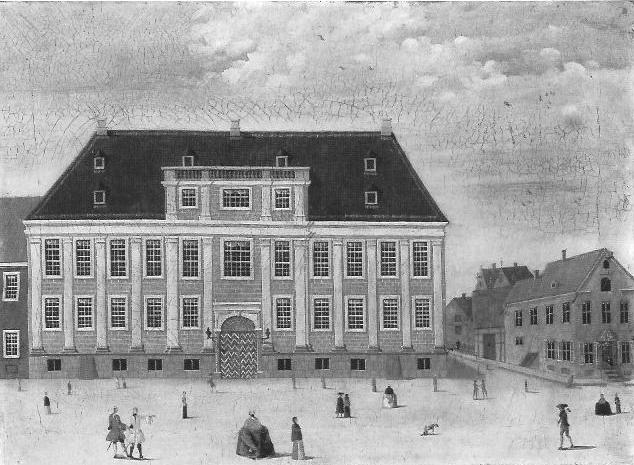
The Danneskjolds Mansion in 1749

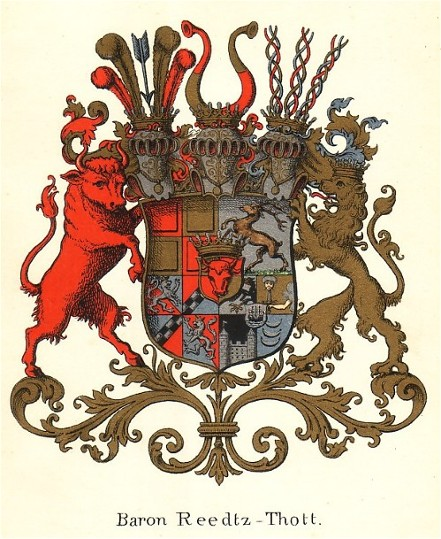
Coat of arms of the Reedtz-Thott family

After Juel's death in 1697, Christian V arranged for his official mistress and mother to five of his children, Sophie Amalie Moth, to take over his mansion. She immediately passed it on to their eldest son, Christian Gyldenløve, who in about 1700 extended the building with a third wing. The house stayed in Gyldenløve's family for two more generations, although it was rented out to foreign envoys during some periods. The owners included Frederik Danneskiold-Samsøe, Gyldenløve's second oldest son, who played an important role in the development of the Nyholm naval base and dockyard.

Countess Anne Sophie Schack acquired the mansion from Count Frederik-Christian Danneskjold in 1734.

=== Thott era ===
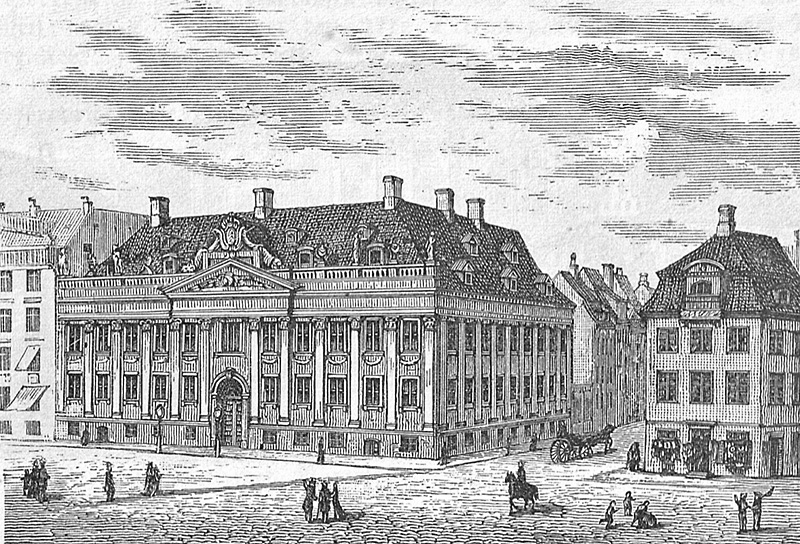
The Thott Mansion in c. 1875

The house was then sold at auction. The buyer was Otto Thott, who gained a reputation for being one of the most learned and competent statesmen of the 18th century in Denmark. He spent his summers at Gavnø in the far south of Zealand and the winters in his mansion at Kongens Nytorv. In 1763, he commissioned Nicolas-Henri Jardin to adapt the building to a more modern style. The mansion housed Thott's extensive collections. At the time of his death, he had a book collection of 138,000 volumes and the largest private art collection in Denmark. His will provided that the latter be sold at auction. The catalogue contains 4,500 items of which 1,000 are oil paintings.

After Thott's death, the mansion stayed in his family. The most notable of his descendants to own the house was Tage Reedtz-Thott. Later the department store Magasin du Nord, located on the other side of the square, had a window exhibition in the mansion's ground floor and a tea garden opened in the courtyard.

=== French ownership ===
The property remained in the ownership of the Thott family until 1930 when it was purchased by the French State and turned into the French Embassy in Denmark.

In 2012, the French State decided to put the mansion through a major restoration under the leadership of Frédéric Didier, head architect at the Palace of Versailles.

== Architecture ==
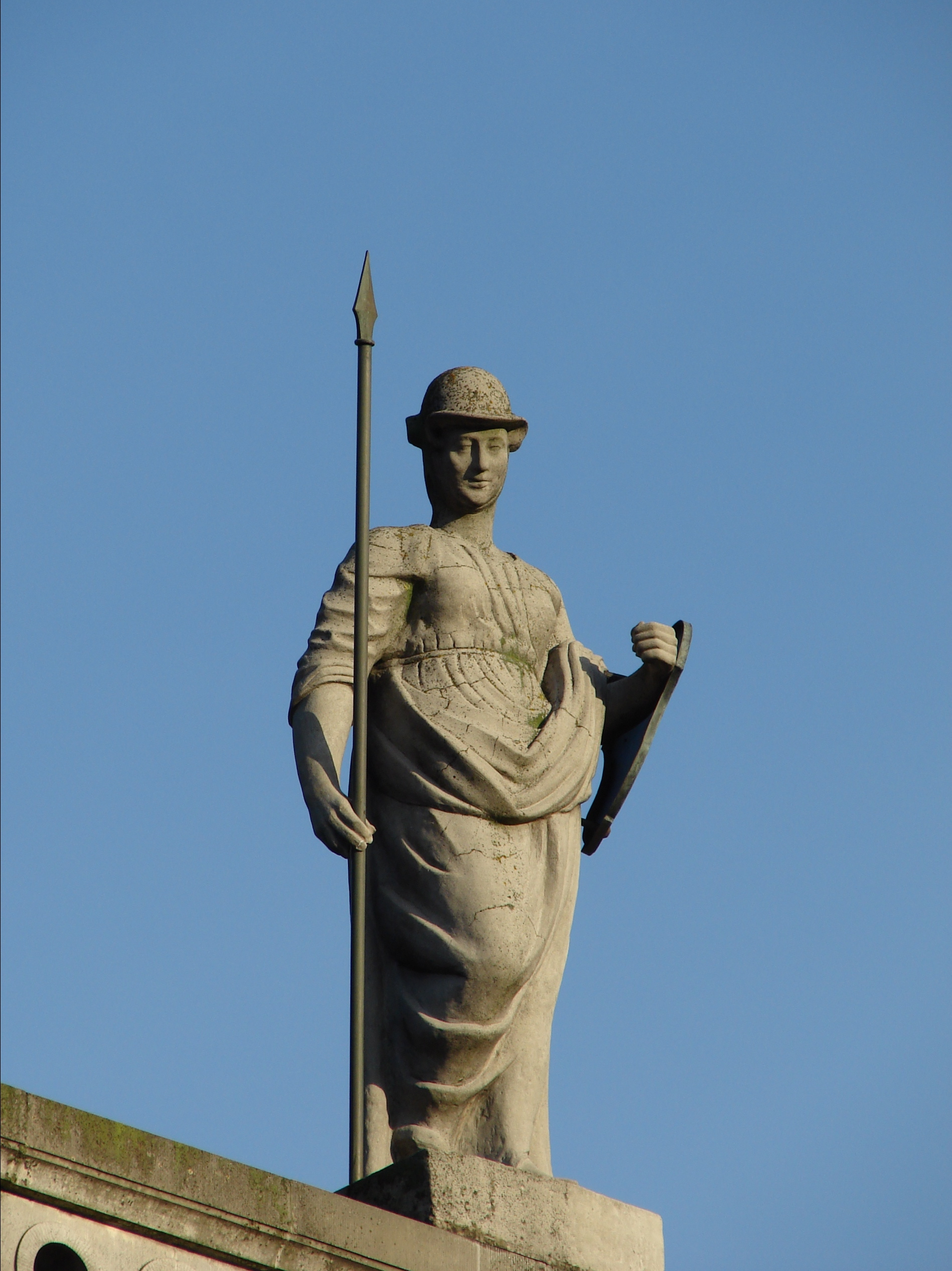
Roof-top statue

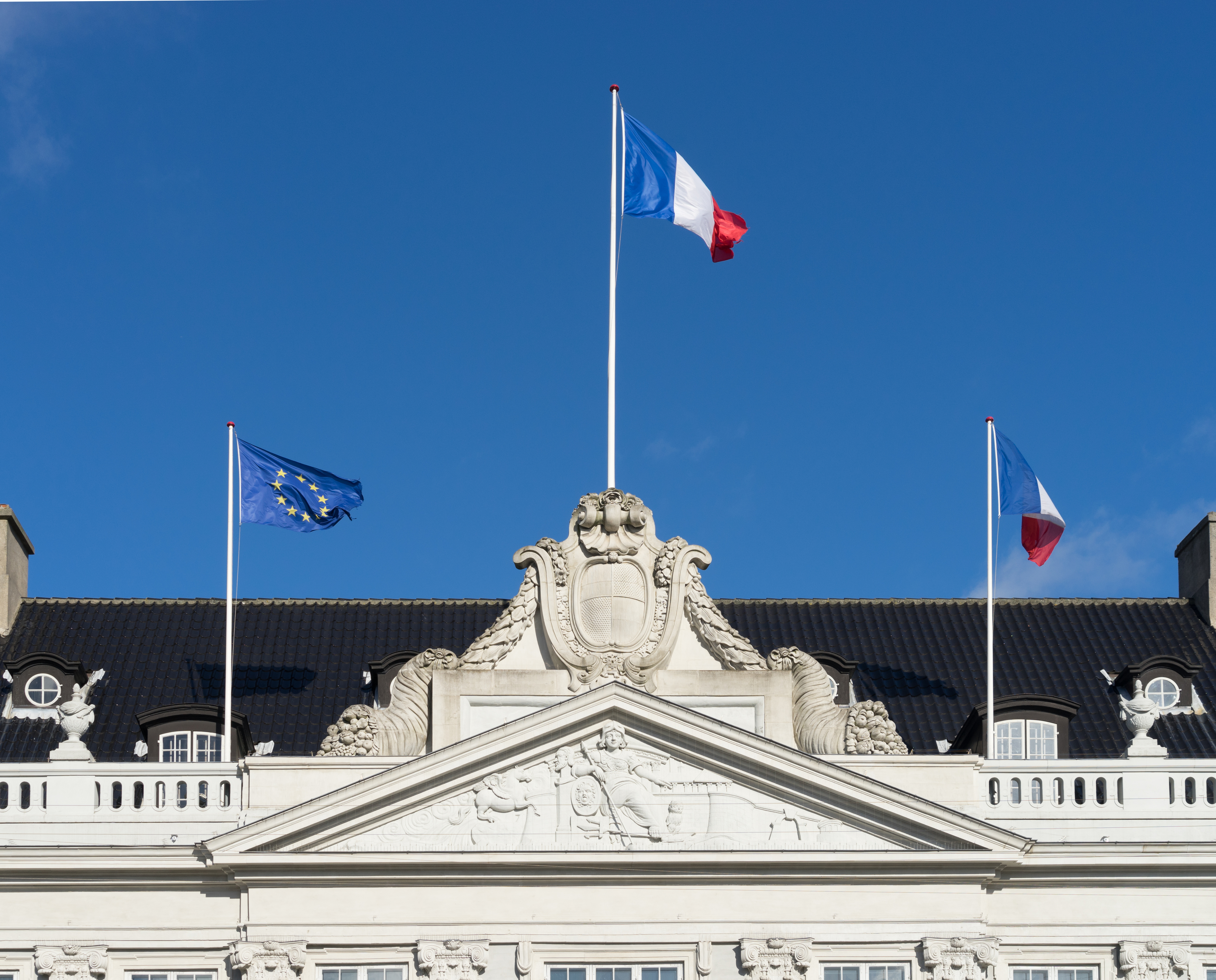
Decorations above the main entrance

Niel's Juel's original mansion was an L-shaped building in the Baroque style. The facade stood in blank red brick decorated with pilasters. Nicolas-Henri Jardin dressed the brick and adapted the building to the Neoclassical style. The triangular pediment above the main entrance towards Kongens Nytorv replaced a belvedere. The sandstone festoons below the first floor and the balustrade with vases and statues on the roof also date from his alterations. The pilasters' original Tuscan capitals can still be seen on the Bredgade facade while they have been replaced by composite Ionic-Corinthian capitals facing the square.

It has previously been assumed that Jardin was also responsible for adapting the interiors. However, examination of Countess Shack's private letters has shown that transformation of the interior actually happened a few years earlier during her ownership to designs by the French architect Christophe Jacob Vallois.

== List of owners ==
- Niels Juel, 1671–1697
- Sophie Amalie Moth , 1697–1699
- Christian Gyldenløve, 1699–1703
- Dorothea Krag, 1703–1720
- Christian Danneskiold-Samsøe, 1720–1728
- Frederik Danneskiold-Samsøe, 1728–1747
- Frederik Christian Danneskiold-Samsøe, 1747–1754
- Anne Sophie Schack, 1754–1760
- Otto Thott, 1760–1785
- Holger Reedtz-Thott, 1785–1797
- Otto Reedtz-Thott, 1797–1862
- Tage Reedtz-Thott, 1862–1922
- Otto Reedtz-Thott, 1922–1927
- Axel Reedtz-Thott, 1927–1930
- State of France, 1930–present
