= 1728 map of Copenhagen =

This 1728 map of Copenhagen shows the overall layout of Copenhagen, Denmark, as well as the location of important buildings and other features, as it appeared Anno 1728, immediately before the Copenhagen Fire of 1728. The map shown here was published by Oluf Nielsen in 1884 but relies on a map published J. F. Arnoldt in January 1728. The original map can be seen here.

== The map ==
North: North is to the left while east is at the top.

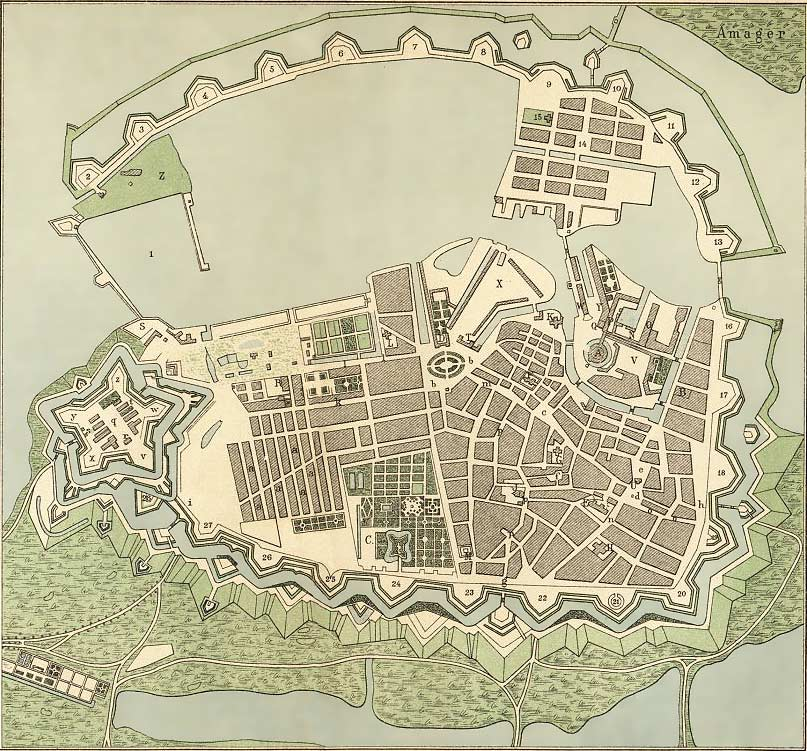

- A. Copenhagen Castle, the royal castle, demolished in 1731 to make way for the first Christiansborg Palace
- B. Prince's Mansion, now the National Museum of Denmark
- C. Rosenborg Castle
- D. Charlottenborg Palace
- E. Church of Our Lady, now the cathedral of Copenhagen
- F. St. Nicolas Church. now an exhibition space
- G. Church of the Holy Ghost
- H. St. Peter's Church
- J. Trinity Church with the Round Tower
- K. Church of Holmen
- L. Garrison Church
- M. Reformed Church
- N. Royal Library, now the Old National Archives building
- O. Christian IV's Arsenal
- P. Proviantgården
- Q. Chancellery Building, now housing the Ministry of Finance
- R. Cadet Academy, now housing the High Court of Eastern Denmark
- S. Copenhagen Custom House
- T. Royal Canan Foundry, demolished
- V. Royal Riding Grounds
- U. Copenhagen City Hall
- W. Børsen, the Exchange Building
- X. Gammelholm, the former site of the Royal Shipyard by then partly moved to Nyholm
- Y. Dronningens Palais
- Z. Nyholm, the new location of the Royal Shipyard and naval base
- a. Nyboder
- b. Kongens Nytorv
- c. Amagertorv
- d. Gammeltorv
- e. Nytorv
- f. Ulfeldts Plads, now known as Gråbrødretorv
- g. Northern City Gate
- h. Western City Gate
- i. Eastern Gate
- k. Store Kongensgade (then Kongensgade)
- l. Bredgade (then Dronningensgade)
- m. Østergade
- n. Nørregade
- o. Vestergade
- p. Købmagergade
- q. Kastellet, the citadel
- r. Kastellet Church, the church at Kastellet
- s. Norway Gate, Kastellet's gate facing away from the city
- t. King's Gate (Zealand Gate), Kastellet's gate towards the city
- u. Magasiner
- v. Kongens Bastion
- w. Dronningens Bastion
- x. Prinsens Bastion
- y. Prinsessens Bastion
- z. Grevens Bastion
- 1. Port of Copenhagen
- 2. Quintus Bastion (Kvintus Bastion)
- 3. Charlotte Amalies Bastion (Charlottes Bastion)
- 4. Frederiks Bastion
- 5. Carls Bastion (Karls Bastion)
- 6. Vilhelms Bastion
- 7. Sofie Hedevigs Bastion (Sofies Bastion)
- 8. Ulriks Bastion
- 9. Løvens Bastion
- 10. Elefantens Bastion
- 11. Panterens Bastion
- 12. Enhjørningens Bastion
- 13. Kalvebods Bastion (Kallebods Bastion)
- 14. Christianshavn
- 15. Church of Our Saviour (Christianhavn Church)
- 16. Ryssenstens Bastion
- 17. Ulriks Bastion
- 18. Gyldenløves Bastion
- 19. Schacks Bastion
- 20. Helmers Bastion (Jarmers Tower)
- 21. Hanens Bastion
- 22. Ahlefeldts Bastion
- 23. Stadsoberstens Bastion
- 24. Rosenborgs Bastion
- 25. Quitzous Bastion
- 26. Peucklers Bastion
- 27. Rosenkrantz' Bastion (Rosenkrantzes Bastion)
- 28. Grønlands Bastion
