= Lille Mølle, Christianshavn =

Museum and former windmill in Christianshavn, Copenhagen, Denmark

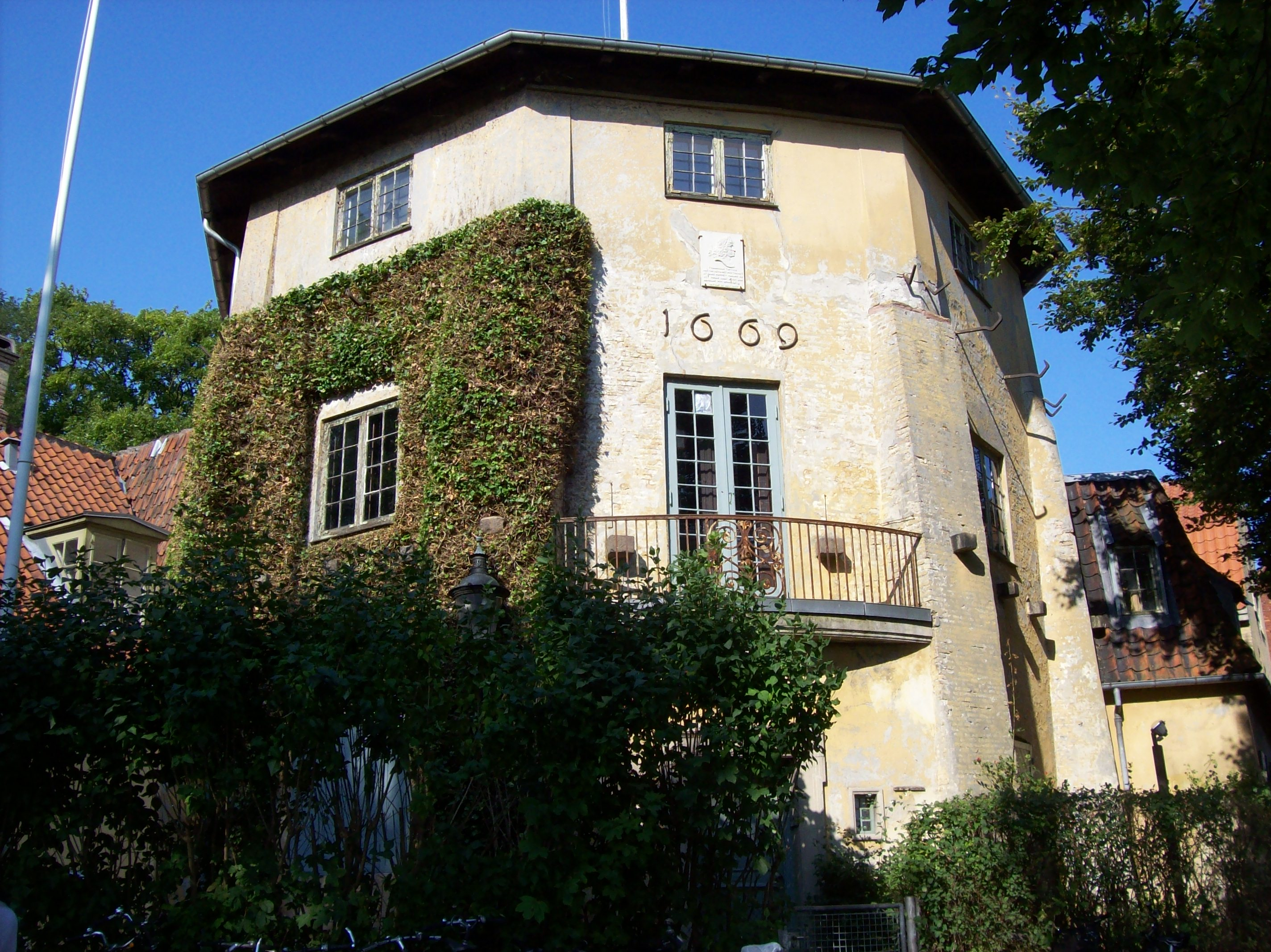
- Interactive map of Lille Mølle, Christianshavn

Origin
- Mill name: Lille Mølle
- Mill location: Christianshavn, Denmark
- Coordinates: 55.671446°N 12.596251°E
- Year built: 1783

Information
- Purpose: Corn mill
- Type: Smock mill
- Base storeys: Three-storey base
- Smock sides: Eight sides
- Year lost: 1909

Lille Mølle (English: Little Mill) is a historic house museum in the Christianshavn neighbourhood of Copenhagen, Denmark. It was the last windmill on the old ramparts of Christianshavn. It is a Dutch smock mill erected in 1783 on one of the bastions, replacing a post mill built in 1669. It was turned into a private home in 1916.

Until 2016, the Little Mill was open to visitors on limited opening hours. Everything was left exactly as it stood when the house was still lived in. The home was at the same time highly eclectic and typical of its period. The National Museum closed this historic house museum in 2016.

== History ==
=== The first windmill ===
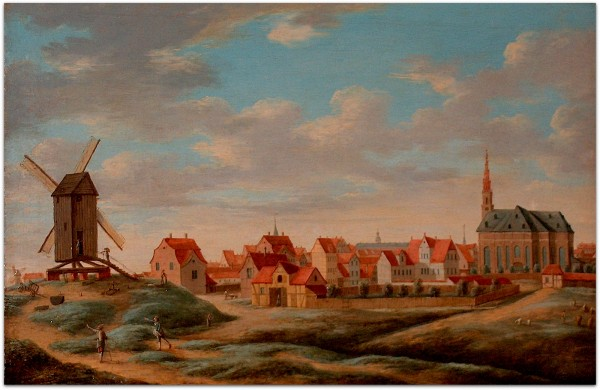
Little Mill in 1754

The first windmill on the site was a post mill built in 1669. It was one of numerous windmills which were constructed on Copenhagen's Bastioned Fortifications. The only other of these to survive today is the windmill at the Kastellet fortress. In the event of siege, a fortified city needed secure supplies, including supplies of flour and rolled groats. In the same time, a location on the bastions provided favourable wind conditions.

=== The second windmill ===
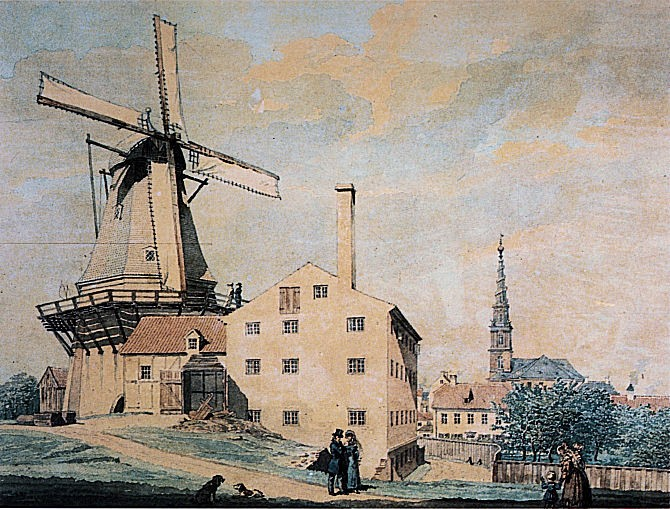
Little Mill painted by Heinrich Gustav Ferdinand Holm in 1845

The old windmill was replaced by a Dutch smock mill erected in 1783. In 1832 the complex was expanded with a four-story steam mill. Together the two mills acted as a grain mill, supplying the citizens of Copenhagen with flour. At the end of the 19th century the mill cap was disassembled and for a while the mill was used by the military for storing straw needed for some nearby barracks, both as fodder for the horses and bedding for the soldiers whose mattresses needed an occasional refill. In 1909 the steam mill was put out of operation.

=== Conversion into a home ===
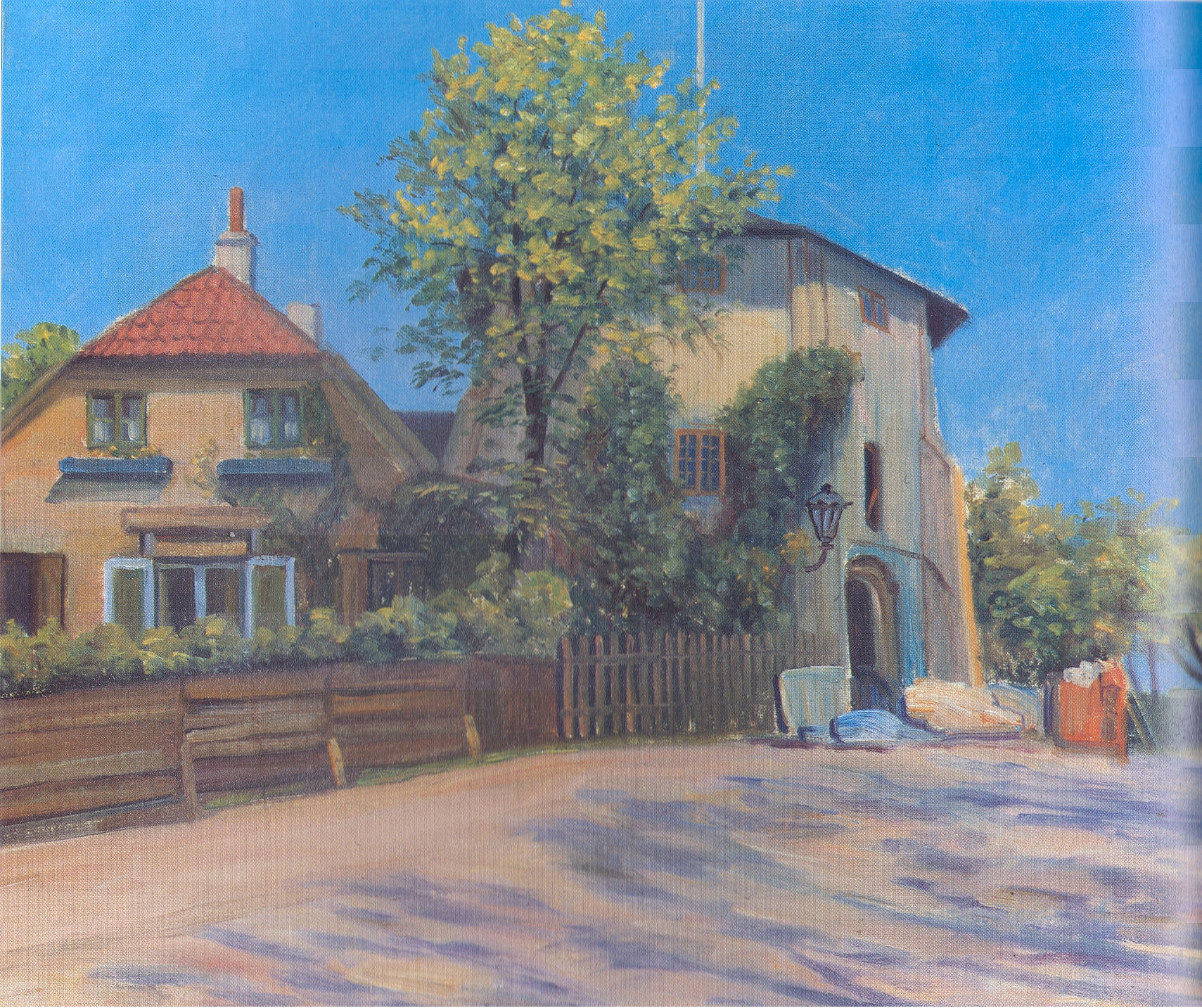
Little Mill without its cap in 1932

In 1916, Little Mill was acquired by Ejnar Flach-Bundegaard, a young engineer, who turned it into the private home of himself and his wife as well as a small factory, DIAF - Dansk Instrument og apparatfabrik (English: Danish Instrument and Device Factory). Mr. and Mrs. Flach-Bundegaard made their highly eclectic home in the five storey octagonal mill base. The factory was located in the steam mill and a warehouse that has now been demolished on the other side of Christianshavn Voldgade.

== The museum today ==
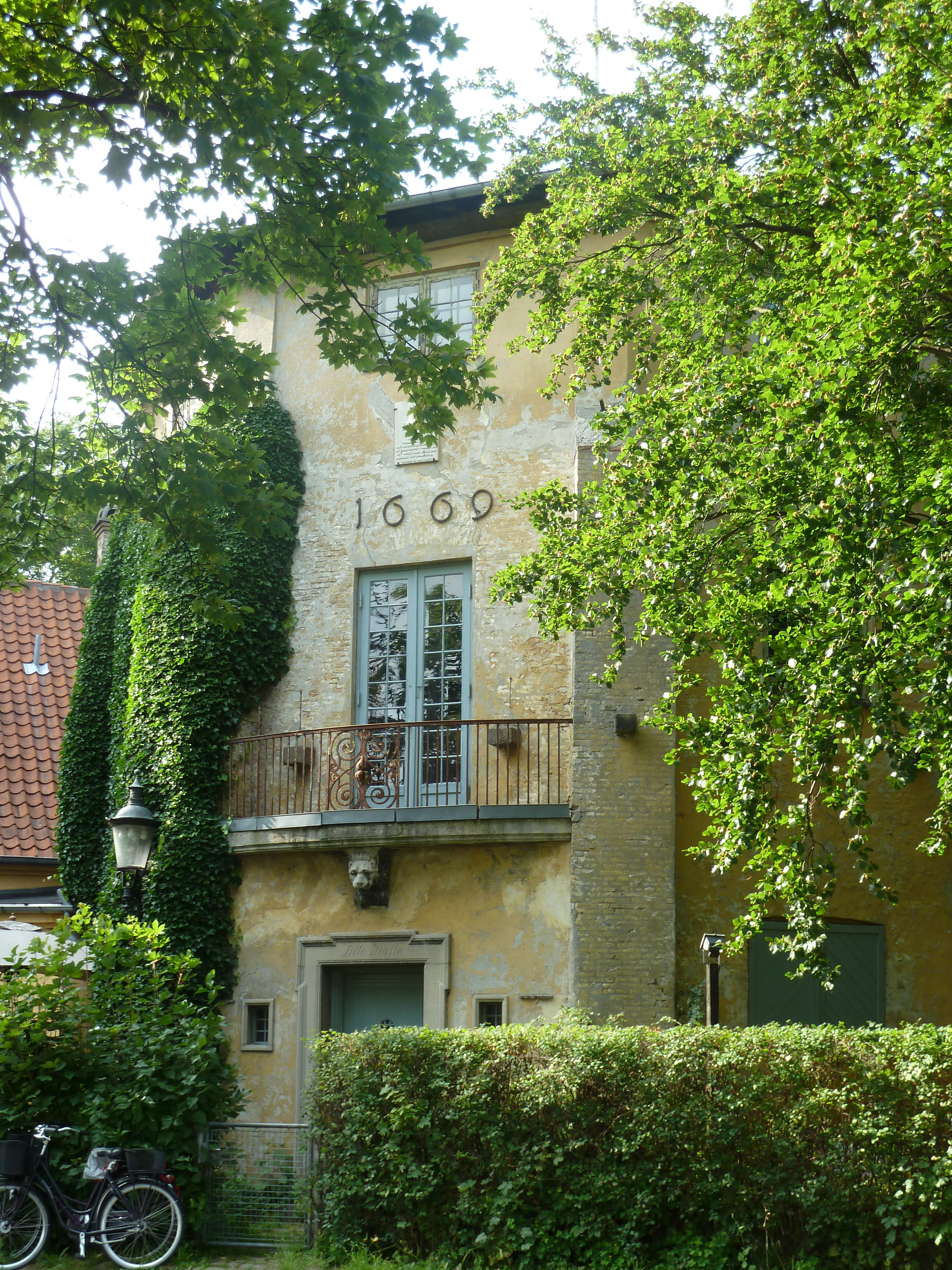
Lille Mølle today

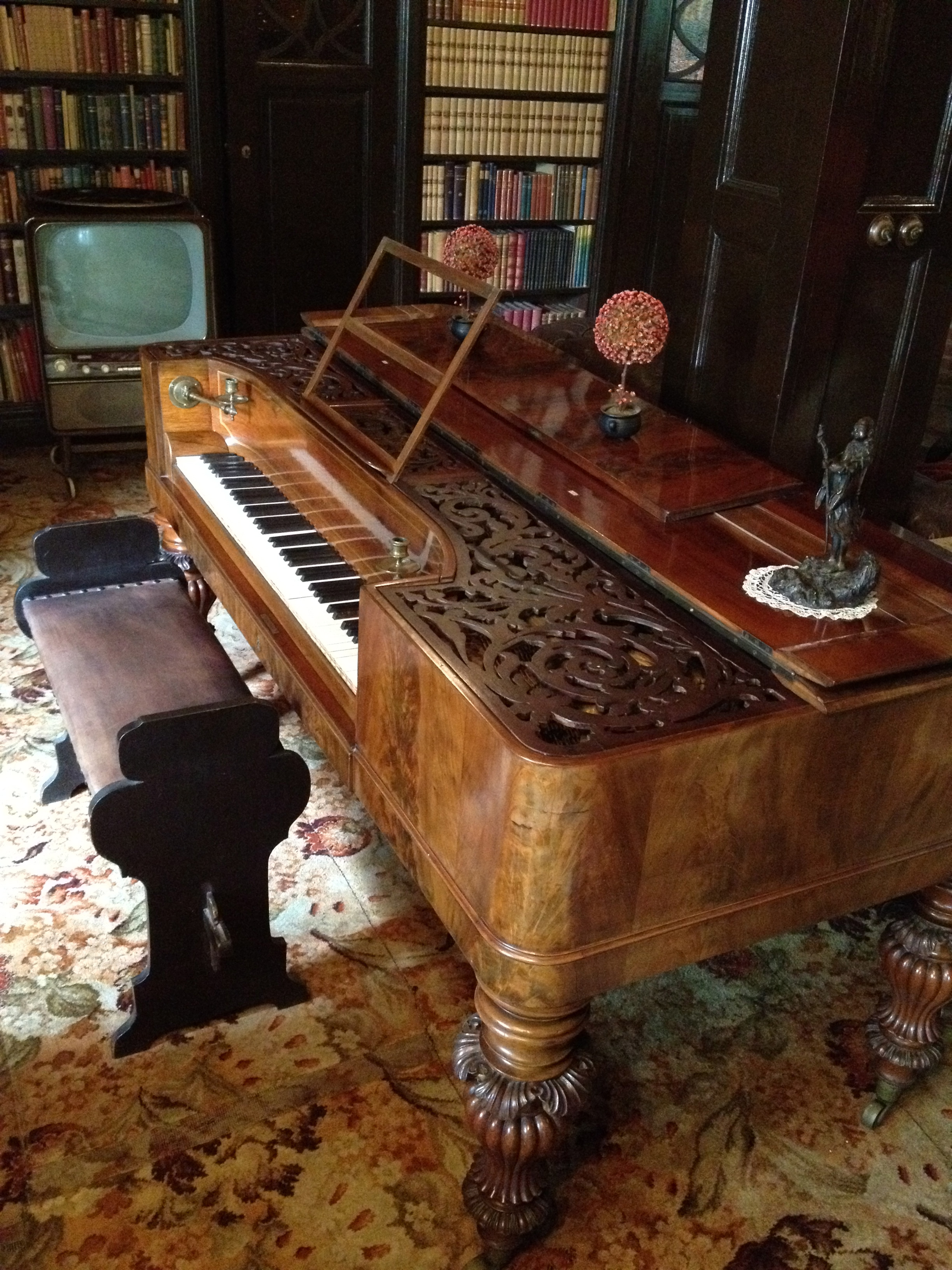
The piano

Ejnar Flach-Bundegaard died in 1949 and his widow in 1974. Shortly before her death, she donated Little Mill to the Danish National Museum, and today everything stands exactly as it did when the couple were alive.

Despite not being a typical home, Little Mill is in some ways characteristic of its period, being furnished in a national romantic yet uniquely personal style.

== See also ==
- Københavns Møllestensfabrik og Møllebyggeri
