= Hotel d'Angleterre =

Deluxe hotel in Copenhagen, Denmark

Coordinates: 55.6806°N 12.5846°E

Hôtel d'Angleterre
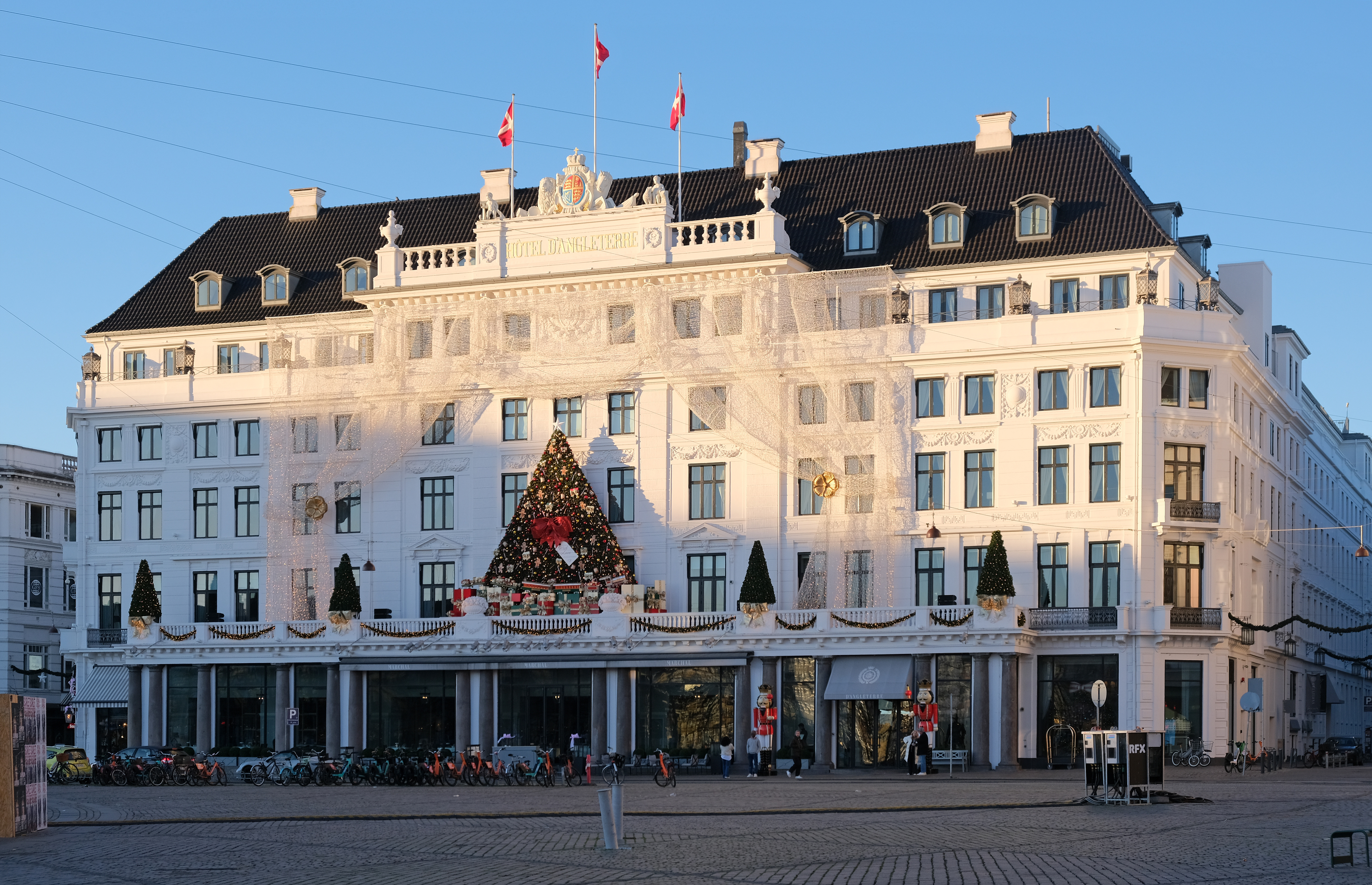
- Interactive map of the Hôtel d'Angleterre area

General information
- Location: Copenhagen, Denmark
- Opening: 1755; 271 years ago

Design and construction
- Architect: Vilhelm Dahlerup

Other information
- Number of rooms: 30
- Number of suites: 60

Website
- Hotel web site

The Hôtel d'Angleterre or Angleterre is one of the first deluxe hotels in the world. Situated in the heart of Copenhagen, Denmark, it is located on Kongens Nytorv opposite Charlottenborg, the Royal Theatre and Nyhavn. While its history dates back to 1755, it has been in its current building since a fire, in 1795, damaged the previous building beyond repair. From 1872 to 1875, the building was significantly extended and refurbished by the architects, Vilhelm Dahlerup and Georg E. W. Møller The hotel has long been considered the most prestigious and elegant hotel in the city. Its name is French and means the "England Hotel".

The Hotel d'Angleterre re-opened in May 2013 following extensive restorations. The new d'Angleterre has 37 rooms and 55 suites. It also has a 1-star Michelin restaurant, "Marchal", led by executive chef, Alexander Baert, a cocktail and champagne bar as well as a spa and health club.

== Awards ==
Condé Nast Traveler has included the Hotel D'Angleterre on its Gold List 2015 of the best hotels in the world.

== Cultural references ==
The kitchen of Hotel D'Angleterre is used as the location for the fictional restaurant Maxim at 0:35:23 in the 1978 Olsen-banden film The Olsen Gang Sees Red.

The protagonist (played by Paul Newman) stays at Hotel d'Angleterre on his way to the GDR in the 1966 Alfred Hitchcock spy film Torn Curtain and Hitchcock is in one of the scenes seen sitting in the lobby with a baby in his arms.

== Notable guests ==
- AC/DC
- H.C. Andersen
- Morten Andersen
- Cecilia Bartoli
- David Beckham
- Karen Blixen
- Bono
- Victor Borge
- Mariah Carey
- José Carreras
- Helena Christensen
- Winston Churchill
- John Cleese
- Bill Clinton
- Michael Davitt
- Cameron Diaz
- Walt Disney
- Barbara Hendricks
- Alfred Hitchcock
- Whitney Houston
- Henrik Ibsen
- Julio Iglesias
- Michael Jackson
- Billy Joel
- Jon Bon Jovi
- Juan Carlos I of Spain
- Grace Kelly
- Diana Krall
- Madonna
- Anne-Sophie Mutter
- Brigitte Nielsen
- Connie Nielsen
- Ozzy Osbourne
- David Rockefeller
- Rolling Stones
- Claudia Schiffer
- Arnold Schwarzenegger
- Justin Timberlake
- U2
- Lars Ulrich
- Robbie Williams
- Oprah Winfrey
- Angus Young
