= St. Agnes' Priory, Gavnø =

Priory in Gavnø, Denmark

Coordinates: 55.1889°N 11.7249°E

St. Agnes Priory was established by Queen Margaret I for a community of Dominican nuns at Gavnø Island. After the Danish Reformation the priory was transformed into a manor estate known as Gavnø Castle located near Næstved, Denmark.

== Priory ==
=== As a fortress ===
Gavnø and several other islands are in a protected fjord just south of the town of Næstved in southern Zealand. These islands' strategic location made them useful from Viking times as a place from which to launch naval raids. It was owned by various pirate (sørover) chiefs with 'forts' at 'Bastnæs', Carlsgab, and Bornakke. Later pirates used Gavnø as a base from which to attack Hanseatic vessels and raid coastal towns, so that the region long had a reputation for piracy. It fell to the royal family during the reign of Valdemar I, who had a hunting residence there which was part residence when he stayed there, part working farm to provide for the workers and their families and royal guests, and later part fortress. Valedmar had fortified the residence and used it to send ships out to raid his enemies in northern Germany and the Baltic. Valdemar fortress was expanded during the years of the German occupation and used as a base from which to attack Danish shipping by German pirates. The island was mortgaged by King Erik VI Menved in 1292 and eventually fell into the possession of the noble Falk family from Scania.

=== As a convent ===
By the early 15th century the royal fortress at Gavnø had lost its strategic importance. In 1398 Margaret I, queen of a united Denmark, Norway, and Sweden, purchased the island from Lady Ida Falk. The fortress was torn down and the materials used to build a new convent for Dominican nuns. It was only the second house for Dominican nuns in Denmark after St. Agnes Priory in Roskilde. In time St Agnes Priory became a residence for unmarried women of position who lived with the nuns. Since the Dominicans were a mendicant order, they existed on the charity of the local community. One way of guaranteeing income was to accept rent properties, mostly farms from the families of unmarried noble women. In return for the income, properties unmarried women lived a quasi-religious life in the security of St. Agnes Priory until they married or took vows.

The priory consisted of a three-range brick enclosure connected to the priory church. One range served as a refectory with cellars underneath, the second as a dormitory, and the third range was for the use of the lay sisters and workers. The priory had a small staff of secular collectors who solicited funds, food, and clothing for the priory's use.

=== Under the Lutheran crown ===
In 1536 Denmark became a Lutheran kingdom under King Christian III and all religious houses and their income properties fell to the crown. Despite the antagonism to the Dominicans' constant requests for money, food, and clothing for their charitable works and for upkeep of the priory, the secularized nuns were permitted to remain at the priory until at least 1556. The prioress continued to maintain order inside the priory while a secular superintendent, Mogens Gøye (ca. 1470–1544), administered priory dealings with the outside world. He was a staunch Lutheran and personally responsible for driving Franciscan friars from several friaries, but protected the women at St. Agnes Priory in his charge with honor and respect.

In 1583 the priory complex was sold to Hans Lindenov (1616-59) by King Frederick II. The priory was converted into a manor house and estate buildings. A tower added at the same time.

The estate was acquired by Niels Trolle (1599– 1667) in 1663. In the late 1660s, the church became a private chapel. It was embellished by Lady Helle Rosenkrantz (1618-1685), widow of Niels Trolle into one of Denmark's most colorful churches and is the only visible remnant of the priory. The fine altarpiece, pulpit, and other furniture from the late 17th century has been largely preserved. There is a 1536 gravestone carved for Lady Margrethe Beck. The wooden crucifix above the altar was in use in the early 16th century and probably dates to the late 15th century. Several remarkable wooden epitaphs have been preserved as well.

== Gavnø Castle ==
In 1737 Count Otto Thott (1703–1785) bought the estate and set about creating what is called today Gavnø Castle. An additional story was added to the surviving ranges, and the Rococo style exterior was added. The south range of the complex is the old dormitory of the priory. Thott was a collector of books, so spaces were created for the 200,000 books in his library, one of the largest private collections in Europe. The walls were hung with the hundreds of paintings he amassed. At his death all the books published before 1530 were donated to the Royal Library in Copenhagen.

The construction of the castle and French formal garden park was complete in 1750. In 1850 the gardens were reconstructed as an English style park with a more open and natural appearance.

In 1960 the entire estate was turned over to a foundation in order to conserve the castle, priory church, and gardens. It has become world famous for its spring tulip display. The property is open to the public, though it is still the residence of the current Baron Reedtz-Thott and family.

== Other Sources ==
- Gavnø Castle (in Danish)
- Gavnø Priory Church (in Danish)
- 'The Castle that Sank in the Deep' (in Danish)
