= Fortifications of Copenhagen (17th century) =

Bastioned Fortifications of Copenhagen
- Copenhagen
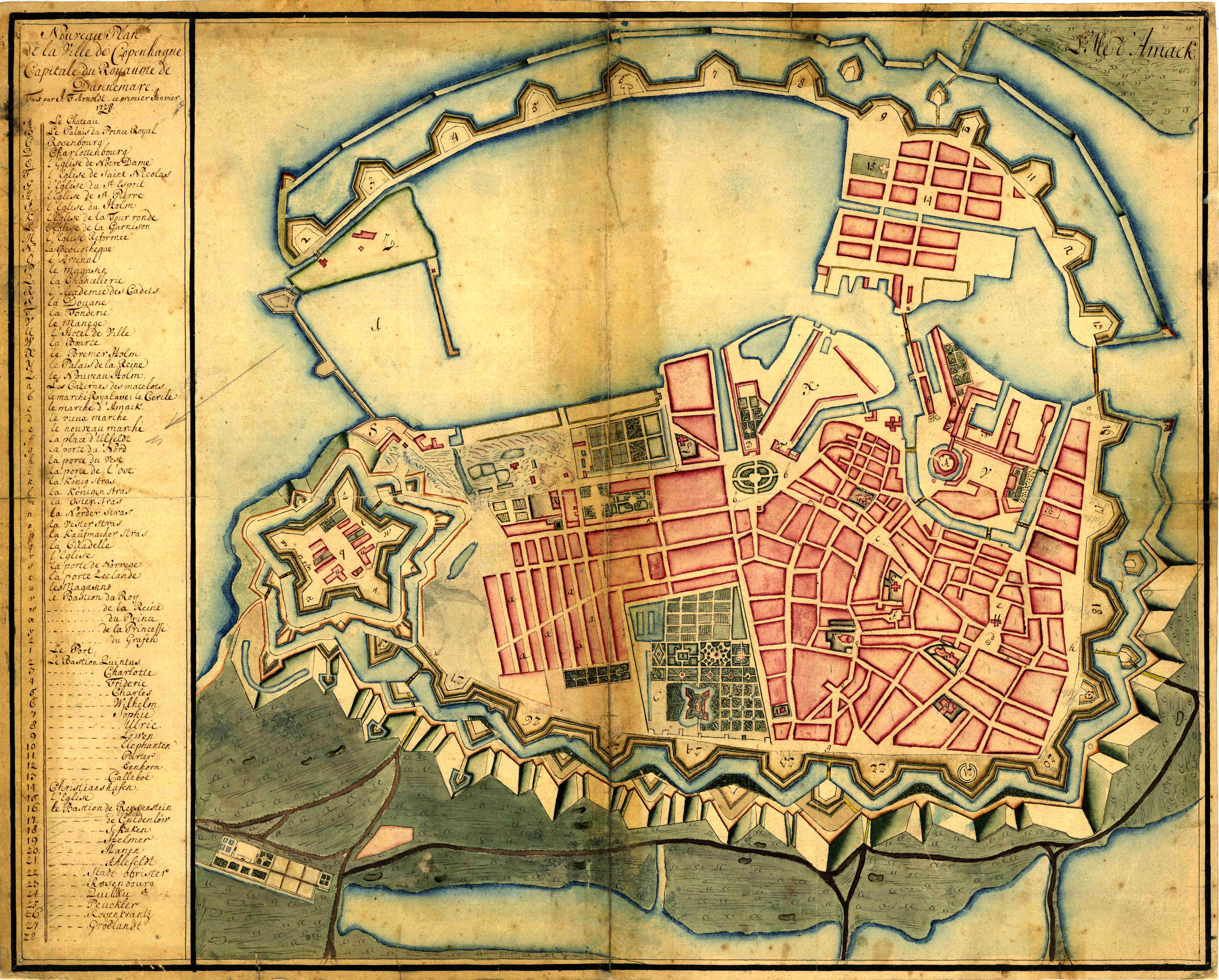
- Map of Copenhagen Anno 1728 with fully developed fortifications

Site information
- Type: Citadel
- Open to the public: Yes
- Condition: Mostly dismantled, parts well-preserved

Site history
- Built: 1606-26
- In use: -1870
- Materials: earthworks, masonry

The fortifications of Copenhagen underwent a comprehensive modernization and expansion in the 17th century. The project was commenced and was largely the masterplan of Christian IV in the early 17th century but was continued and completed by his successors. The new fortifications relied on the existing, medieval fortifications of the city but the fortified area was extended and a defensive ring around the city completed particularly with new edifices facing the sea. The ring fortification consisted of four bastioned ramparts and an annexed citadel as well as various outworks.

Though largely developed to a final form in the 17th century, the fortifications remained in use until the second half of the 19th century, when they finally, a long time overdue, were decommissioned. Today only the Christianshavn Rampart and the citadel Kastellet remain intact, while the rest of the fortifications were dismantled in the years after its demise. The grounds were to a large extent laid out as parks, forming a green band around the city centre still known as the Fortification Ring, as well as for construction of a number of public buildings, including the new Copenhagen City Hall as well as a number of museums.

== History ==
=== Christian IV's modernization project ===
Christian IV's modernization of the fortifications of Copenhagen commenced in 1606 and would take 20 years to complete. The course of the medieval fortifications was kept but Slotsholmen was now incorporated into the complex. A large bastion in masonry was constructed on its southwestern tip and connected to Vestervold by a vaulted dam known as Løngangen. In the same time, Østervold was taken around parts of Bremerholm to meet the sea.

A total of 12 bastions were constructed and just outside the entire fortification a moat was dug. Due to topographical variations in the terrain, it was constructed as a series of basins, separated by dams, to solve the problem of variations in the terrain. The uppermost basin was fed by water from Peblingesøen. The Western and Northern City Gates were also renovated and given tall spires and a new Eastern City Gate was built.

From 1618 to 1623 Christianshavn was laid out and incorporated as a privileged market town. Strategically situated in the middle of a shallow-watered, marshy area north of Amager, the town was fortified with low earthworks facing Amager. The rampart was constructed with four and a half bastions and a gate, known as Amager Gate.

To guard the northern entrance to the port, a blockhouse was constructed on the shallow-watered Refshaleø in 1624. On the Zealand side of the harbour, north of the city, an advanced post, named Sankt Annæ Skanse (English: St. Anne's Redoubt) was constructed, on the site later to become Kastellet. This work was begun in 1627.

=== Expansion of the fortified city ===
As part of his aspirations to strengthen Copenhagen as a regional centre, Christian IV decided to expand the area of the fortified city northwards. As early as 1606, when his modernization of the fortifications began, he had purchased 200 hectares of land outside the Eastern City Gate. His intention was to redevelop this area into a new district referred to as Ny København (English: New Copenhagen) or Sankt Annæ By (Saint Ann's Town). The plan was to change the course of Østervold, which at that time made a bend and ran along what is today Gothersgade and Kongens Nytorv. The new Østervold would be a direct extension of Nørrevold, connecting it to Sankt Annæ Skanse, thereby increasing the area of the fortified city with approximately 40%. However, the 1630s was a time of economic crisis and both Sankt Annæ Skanse and the new course of Østervold was delayed with no major work going on during that decade. After both Jutland and Scania had been occupied by enemy forces in the first half of the 1640s and the Kingdom's very existence had been threatened, work on the fortifications was resumed.

The new Østervold was constructed and a new project for the fortress at Sankt Annæ Skanse, with the layout of a bastioned pentagram, was completed in 1661.

=== Decommissioning of the fortifications ===
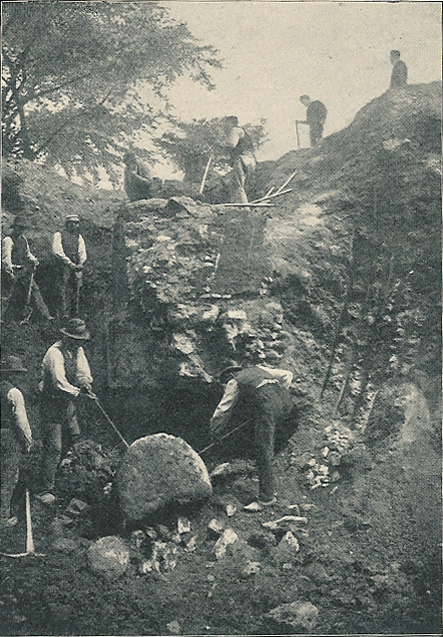
Remains of the fortifications being removed c. 1900

The British bombing of Copenhagen during the Battle of Copenhagen in 1807 made it clear that the city's fortifications were outdated but during the years of economic constraints that followed, no action was taken. In 1840 Christian VIII appointed a national defense commission which two years later recommended that the existing fortifications be decommissioned.

At the outbreak of the First Schleswig War in 1848, nothing had happened and considerable work was carried out to strengthen the ramparts around the city gates in the event of a German attack. In 1852, the Line of Demarcation was partially disabandoned but work to maintain and improve the ramparts were carried out as late as 1856–57.

In 1868 a law finally provided for the official abolishment of the demarcation statutes and the disabandonment of the fortifications proper. In 1856–58 the city gates were dismantled. These provisions did not apply to fortifications at Christianshavn and Kastellet. Christianshavn's ramparts were extended as late as 1868–1870 with a rampart along the east coast of the newly reclaimed Refshaleø, which only a few years later was rented out to the shipyard Burmeister & Wain. The fortifications at Christianshavn remained in use into the 20th century. Some areas were opened up in the late 1910s, and the last areas were not made public until 1961.

== Fortifications ==
=== Ramparts ===
The ramparts generally consisted of large earthworks with a ditch in front of it.

As part of the improvements, numerous bastions were constructed along their course. In 1781, after extensive work on the fortifications in the preceding years, the bastions were given official names according to group: The bastions in Copenhagen were named for officers of note from the siege or other events of the early absolute era, the bastions at Christianshavn were named for powerful animals and at Kastellet. Since 1669, the bastions at Kastellet had been named for members of the royal family and the King's lands.

==== Nørrevold ====
Nørrevold ran from Jarmers Tower to a site just east of Nørreport, at the junction of today's Gothersgade and Øster Voldgade.

==== Vestervold ====
In connection with a modernisation of Vestervold in the 1660s, the ramparts were extended towards the south from Vesterport all the way to the coastline and into the water on reclaimed seabed. The extension included three new bastions, two of which were located on reclaimed land.

==== Østervold ====
Originally Østervold ran from a location just east of Nørreport along today's Gothersgade to Østerport's original location at the end of Østergade. As result of Christian IV's efforts to modernize the fortifications, the southern end of Østervold was continued around parts of Bremerholm.

After the expansion of the fortified city in the 1650s, Østervold continued Nørrevold in a straight north-eastern direction, connecting the fortifications to the north side of Kastellet.

==== Christianshavns Vold ====
The first Christianshavns Vold, constructed around 1620, had 4 and a half bastions. In the 1670s, when Vestervold was extended to reach the sea, Christiansvold was moved and extended to match the new course of Vestervold. The new Christianshavns Vold had 5 very large bastions. Around the entire complex was a moat with a protecting counterscarp. From 1682 to 1692 Christianshavns Vold was extended once more, this time northwards, to guard the entrance to the harbour and protect the new base for the Royal Fleet at Nyholm. The extension included 7 new bastions, named for current members of the royal family. The last extension of Christianshavns Vold was constructed as late as 1878–82, when a rampart was constructed along the eastern margin of the newly reclaimed Refshaleø.

=== City gates ===
The gates that once guarded the entrances to the City of Copenhagen through the City Ramparts were stone buildings that had a single archway through the middle for traffic, protected by gates and portcullises. There were four gates affording access to the city.

==== Østerport ====
Østerport was originally located at the end of Østergade, where Kongens Nytorv lies today. When the fortified city was expanded in the late 17th century to make room for the new royal square and the district Saint Anne's Town, Østerport was dismantled and a new gate built at a site close to present day Østerport railway station. While the original East Gate faced east, the new gate was very close the northernmost point of the city.

It is uncertain when the new Østerport was built but it may have been as early as 1647. Its original design is unknown but in 1708 it was rebuilt by Frederik VIII to a fairly modest design. The gate was dismantled in 1857.

==== Nørreport ====
Nørreport was located at a site where Nørreport station lies today. Nørregade, which led to the original gate, is named for it. Due to its location, it was the gate used by travellers from Norway and Sweden, arriving via Elsinore, as well as Northern Zealand. Since the royals often resided at Frederiksborg Palace during the summer, arriving and departing through Nørreport, the street immediately inside the new gate was named Frederiksborggade. In 1671, during the reign of Christian V, an older gate was replaced by a new one, built to the design of Lambert van Haven. It was the tallest and finest of the city's gates with ornamentation in sandstone. It was dismantled in 1857.

==== Vesterport ====
The first Vesterport was erected in 1588 and later rebuilt in stone by Frederik III in 1668. The new gate was almost 4 metres wide and 4 1/2 metres tall and as an architectural curiosity, with canon barrels used as columns to support the main cornice. The gate was renovated in 1722 by Frederick IV. Vesterport was the most fortified of the city's gates. It was the gate most used for transportation of goods from Zealand. Opening to the main road which led to Korsør, it was also through this gate that travellers from Jutland and Funen would normally arrive.

==== Amagerport ====
Amagerport was rebuilt in 1724 and dismantled in 1857.

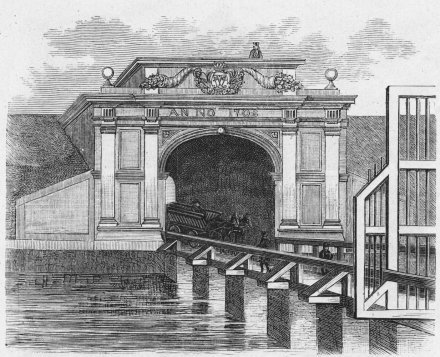
Østerport

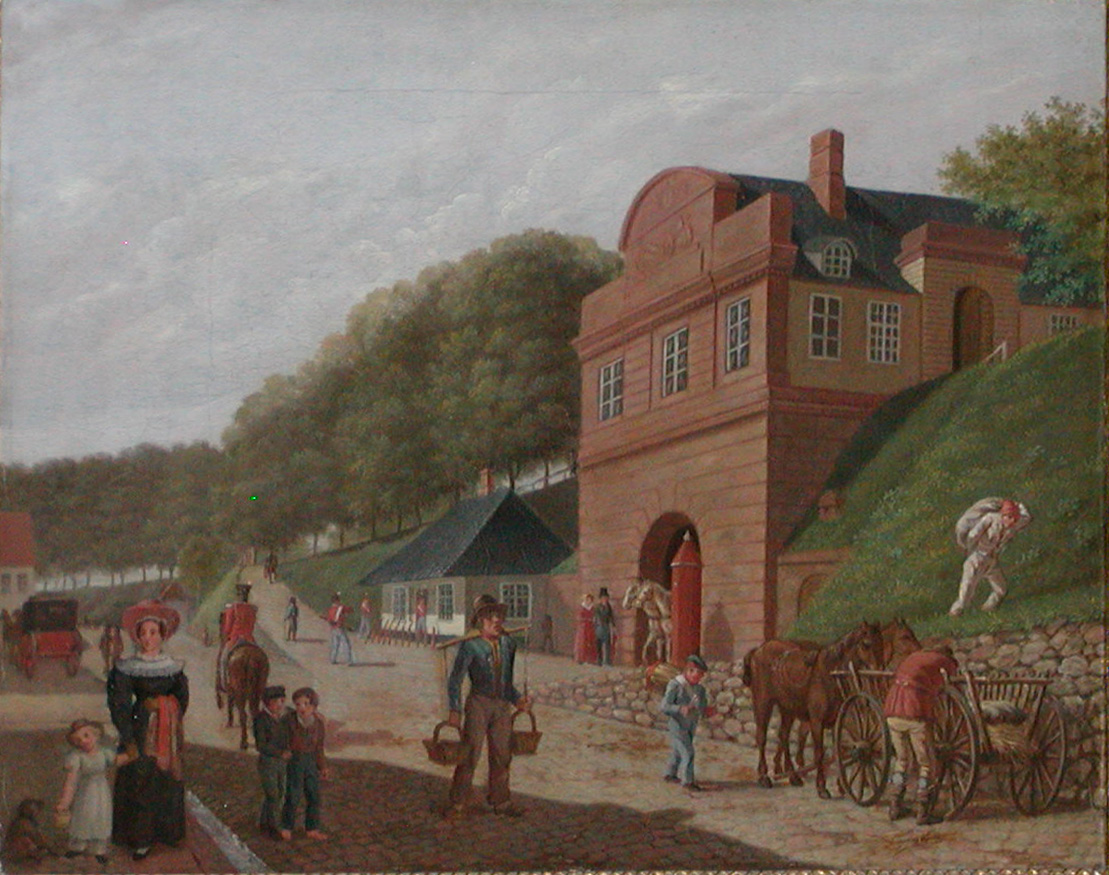
Nørreport from inside the gates, painting by Christoffer Wilhelm Eckersberg, Museum of National History

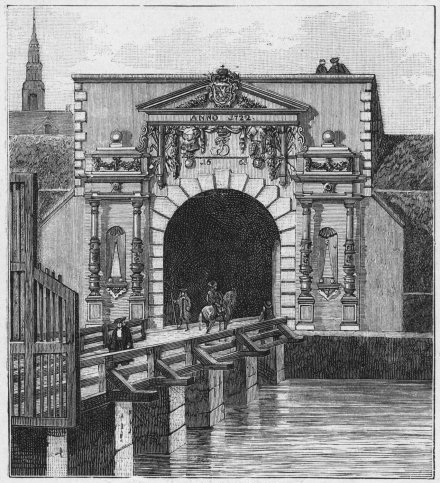
Vesterport

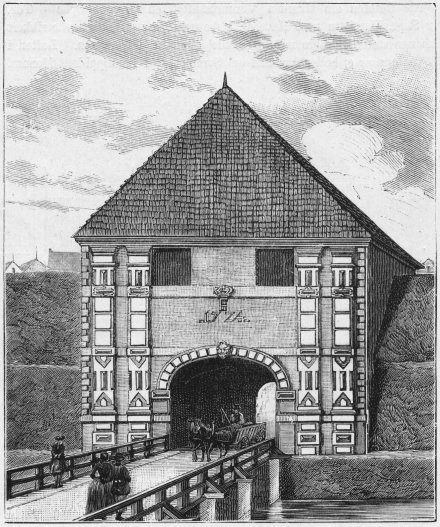
Amagerport

=== Kastellet ===
As part of Cristian IV's endeavour to improve the fortification, he planned and commenced the construction of a citadel known as Kastellet, constructed in connection with the ramparts in the form of a pentagram. Construction began in 1626 with the building of an entrenchment in the northern part of the defense wall of the city. The original plans included construction of a castle at the site for the King to seek haven in the event of siege, but this part of the plan was dropped on account of economic constraints. Construction continued with his successor King Christian III. After the Swedish siege on Copenhagen (1658–1660) the Dutch engineer Henrik Rüse was called in to help rebuild and extend the construction. The fortification was named Citadellet Frederikshavn ("The Frederikshavn Citadel"), but it is better known as Kastellet ("the citadel").

=== Outside the ramparts ===
==== Demarcation line ====
Immediately outside the ramparts, there was a no-build zone, known as the Line of Demarcation (Danish: Demarkeringslinjen). The demarcation line was introduced in 1661 after the Assault on Copenhagen. It reached from the fortification ring to Jagtvej. The construction of new buildings in this zone required special permission. It was generally a requirement that they could easily be burnt in the event of an enemy attack. In 1852, the demarcation line was moved from Jagtvej to the eastern shoreline of The Lakes.

==== The Lakes ====
The row of lakes today known as Søerne used to be located just outside the fortifications, running along Nørrevold as well as parts of Østervold and Vestervold. They originate in a need for dammed water for watermills, leading to the creation of the first lake, but after a siege of Copenhagen in 1523, it was decided to extend the entrenchments for strategic purposes, incorporating them into the defence of the city as an extra barrier. The levee at Peblinge Sø was expanded and another dam was constructed, which resulted in the creation of Sortedams Sø. In the beginning of the 17th century, Sankt Jørgens Sø was created, as a result of further damming. As a results of these efforts, it was now possible to flood the banks and lakes in case of an attack on the city.

== Other uses ==
=== Gunpowder magazines ===
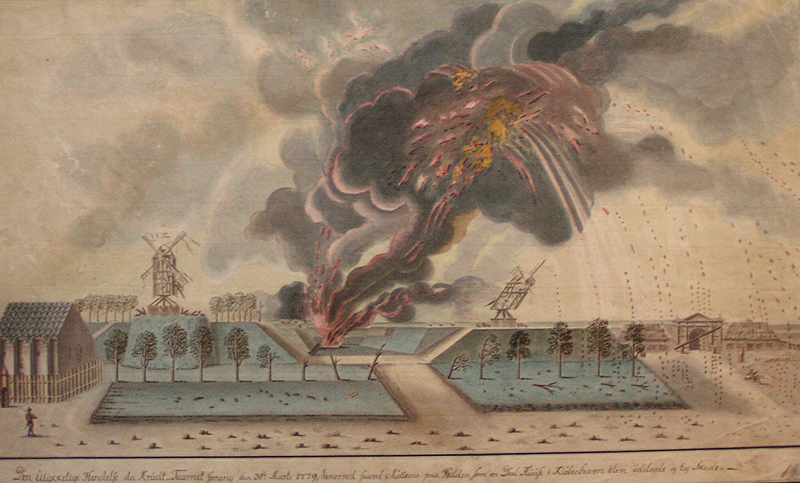
The explosion of the gunpowder magazine next to the Eastern City Gate in 1779

A substantial number of gunpowder magazines were located in the fortifications

After his appointment as Naval Building Master at Holmen, Hans van Steenwinckel the Youngest was responsible for the construction of two gunpowder magazines at the Christianshavn Rampart. Construction of the first magazine, located at Vilhelms Bastion, was commenced in 1688, while the second one, built to a similar design at Carls Bastion, began two years later.

The gunpowder magazine at the Eastern Rampart exploded on two occasions. The first time was on 16 December 1658, during the Swedish siege of Copenhagen in the Second Northern War. On 31 March 1779 it exploded again. Seven people were killed and 47 were injured. It was subsequently rebuilt and not decommissioned until 1872.

=== Windmills ===
Many of the bastions were used for the construction of wind mills. Due to their height they offered particularly good wind conditions. In the same time, a fortified city needed secure supplies, including supplies of flour and rolled groats, in the event of siege. In 1800, a total of 16 windmills were found on the ramparts of Copenhagen.

In 1669–70 windmills were constructed on both of the bastions flanking Amager City Gate in Christianshavns Rampart, then known as the Mill Bastion (now the Elephant's Bastion) and the Bastion at the Church (now the Lion's Bastion). Breslaus Mølle on the Mill Bastion was demolished in 1842. Little Mill on the Lion's Bastion was originally a post mill but it was destroyed in a storm and replaced by a smock mill in 1783. It remained in use til the late 19th century, from 1832 supplemented by a steam mill which remained in use until 1909.

Also in 1669, the miller Hans Hansen obtained permission to build a mill on Gyldenløves Bastion, just south of the Western City Gate. Whether it later burned or was never built is uunknown, but in 1697 Jürgen Gosbruch, another miller, received permission to build a windmill on the same site. It was known as Luciemølle or Lusse Møllen. Some time during the 1790s, another windmill, known as Store Kongens Mølle (English: Large King's Mill), was built on Shacks Bastion on the other side of the Western City Gate. in 1692 a windmill was also built at Gothersgade, on the old Eastern Rampart.

Dronningens Mølle (English:Queen's Mill) was located on Rosenkrantz' Bastion in the Eastern Rampart. It was completely destroyed when the gunpowder magazine at the Eastern Rampart exploded on 31 March 1779. It was rebuilt but torn down in 1895.

When the British besieged Copenhagen in 1807, it was feared that they would destroy the mills on the fortifications. Therefore, two extra mills were constructed on less exposed locations, one at Sølvgade and one on Nyholm.

== The fortifications today ==
=== Fortification Ring ===
The grounds which used to be occupied by the fortifications are still known as the Fortification Ring (Danish: Fæstningsringen). From the ramparts were first decommissioned and purchased by the City of Copenhagen, their grounds have been dominated by parks and other recreational uses. It is still municipal policy that the Fortification Ring is maintained and developed as a green band within the urban area of the city.

Parks located within the Fortification Ring include Østre Anlæg, University of Copenhagen Botanical Garden and Ørstedsparken. The preserved parts of the fortifications at Christianshavn and Kastellet are also green and serve as parks. This also applies for Freetown Christiania which is partially located on the northern part of the Christianshavn Ramparts. The area also houses a number of museums, including the National Gallery, The Hirschsprung Collection and Lille Mølle.

=== Remains of the fortifications ===
- Kastellet
- Christianshavn Rampart
- Jarmers Tower

== See also ==
- Fæstningens Materielgård
