= Lambert van Haven =

Danish-Norwegian architect, master builder, and painter

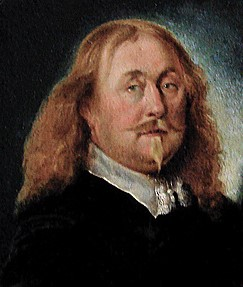
- Lambert van Haven painted by his brother Michael van Haven
- Born: 16 April 1630; Bergen, Norway
- Died: 9 May 1695 (aged 65); Copenhagen, Denmark
- Occupation: Architect

Lambert van Haven (16 April 1630 - 9 May 1695) was a Danish-Norwegian architect, master builder and painter. He was born in Bergen, the son of the artist Solomon van Haven who had already succeeded in winning the favour of the Danish-Norwegian monarchy.

Starting in 1653, he spent some 16 years travelling in Italy, France and the Netherlands where he studied Baroque painting and architecture.

Under Christian V, he was appointed Denmark-Norway's first official General Building Master in 1671 with overall responsibility for executing the king's architectural wishes. He died in Copenhagen.

== Principal works ==
=== Church of Our Saviour ===
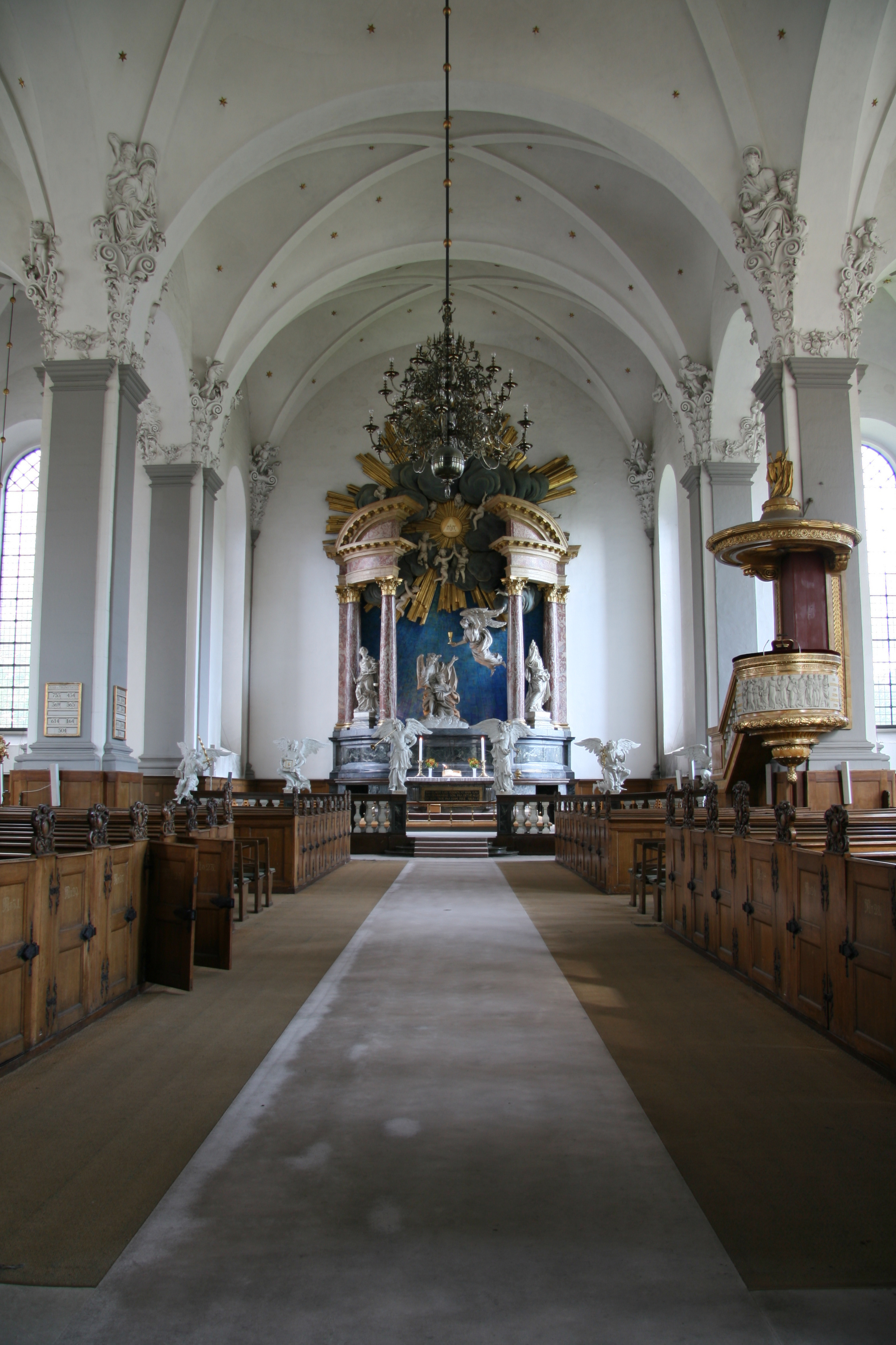
Lambert van Haven: Church of Our Saviour, Copenhagen

Van Haven is remembered above all for his architecture, especially for the enormous Church of Our Saviour, Copenhagen built in the Dutch Baroque style in the form of a Greek cross with Tuscan pilasters rising to the top of the facade.

=== Nørreport ===
Commissioned by Christian V, van Haven also designed the imposing new Nørreport city gate (1671) after the original gate had fallen into disrepair. Until it was dismantled in 1857, it was considered to be the tallest and finest of Copenhagen's city gates with fine sandstone ornamentation.

=== Frederiksborg interiors ===
Inspired by the Italian and French Baroque style, especially Bernini's, he designed the interiors of Frederiksborg Palace which had been damaged by fire. The Audience Chamber, glorifying Christian V, is considered a masterpiece.

=== Other contributions ===
He probably also participated in the design of Charlottenborg Palace and in that of Niels Juel's Mansion on Kongens Nytorv, now the French Embassy. He was also involved in designing a residential palace on Slotsholmen but this was never realised.

== See also ==
- Architecture of Denmark
