= Embassy of France, Copenhagen =

Diplomatic mission of France to Denmark

French Embassy in Denmark
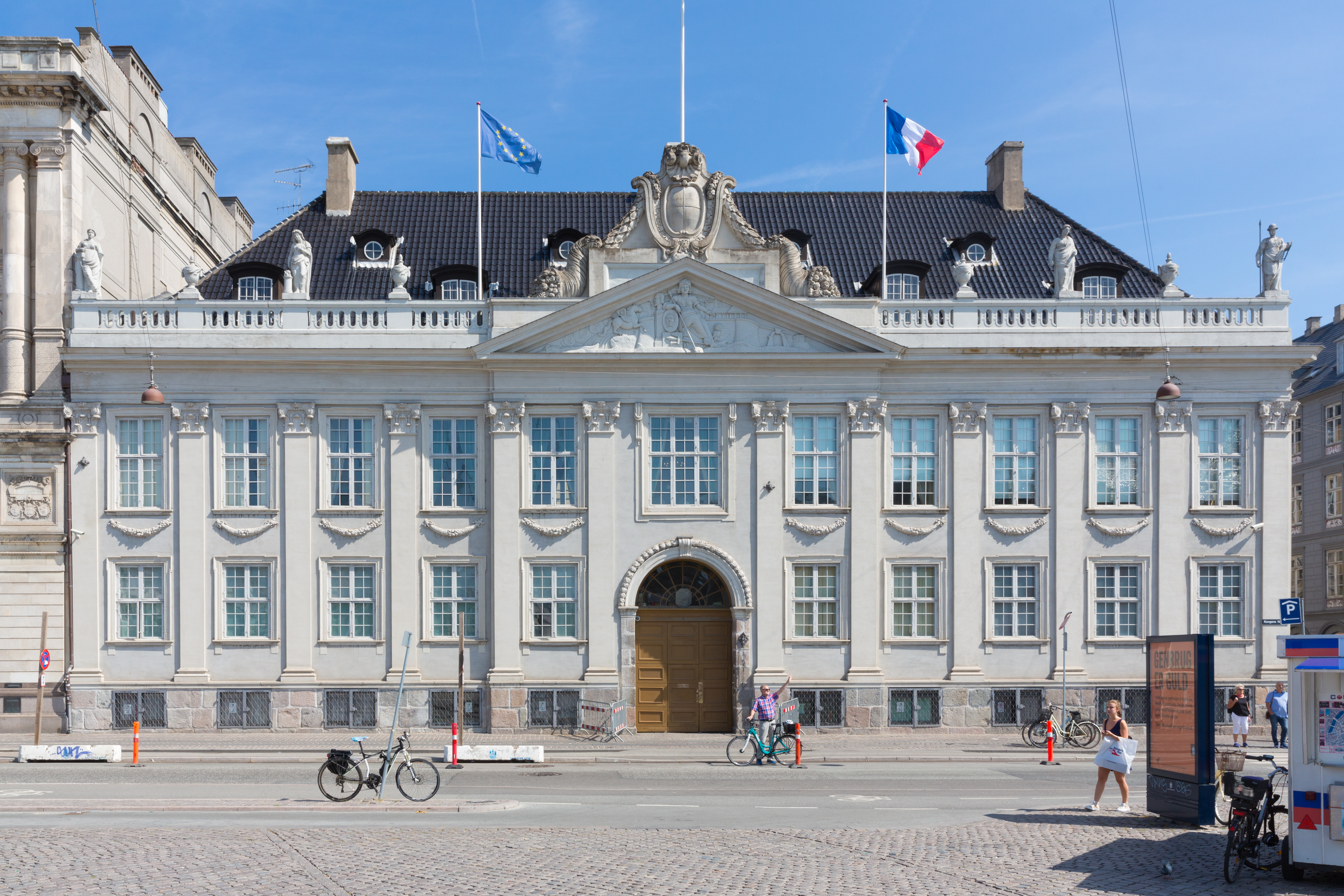
- Location: Copenhagen
- Address: Kongens Nytorv 4
- Coordinates: 55°40′52″N 12°35′14″E
- Ambassador: Christophe Parisot

The French Embassy in Copenhagen is the main diplomatic mission of France to the Kingdom of Denmark. It is located in the Thott Palace at Kongens Nytorv 4 in central Copenhagen, Denmark. The ambassador since June 15, 2022 is Christophe Parisot, in replacement of Caroline Ferrari.

== Thott Palace ==
The building now housing the French Embassy was built for the Danish naval hero Niels Juel from 1683 to 1686 as the just second building on Kongens Nytorv which, inspired by the royal squares of Paris, had been laid out by Christian V of Denmark in the years following his coronation in 1670. With his victory in the Battle of Køge Bay, Niels Juel had won fame and wealth. His new mansion was designed by Lambert van Haven as an L-shaped building in the Dutch Baroque style.

After Niels Juel's death in 1697, the king, Christian V of Denmark, arranged for his official mistress and mother to five of his children, Sophie Amalie Moth, to take over his mansion. She immediately passed it on to him and the king's eldest son, Christian Gyldenløve, who around 1700 extended the building with a third wing.

In 1769, the palace was acquired by Otto Thott, who had the facade towards modernized to the design of Nicolas-Henri Jardin in 1763–64. The property remained in the belonging of the Thott family until 1930 when it was purchased by the French state and turned into the French Embassy in Denmark.

== Cultural activities ==
The embassy is today also used as a venue for a multitude of activities including conferences, lectures, wine tastings and guided tours.
