= Jarmers Tower =

- Jarmers Tårn
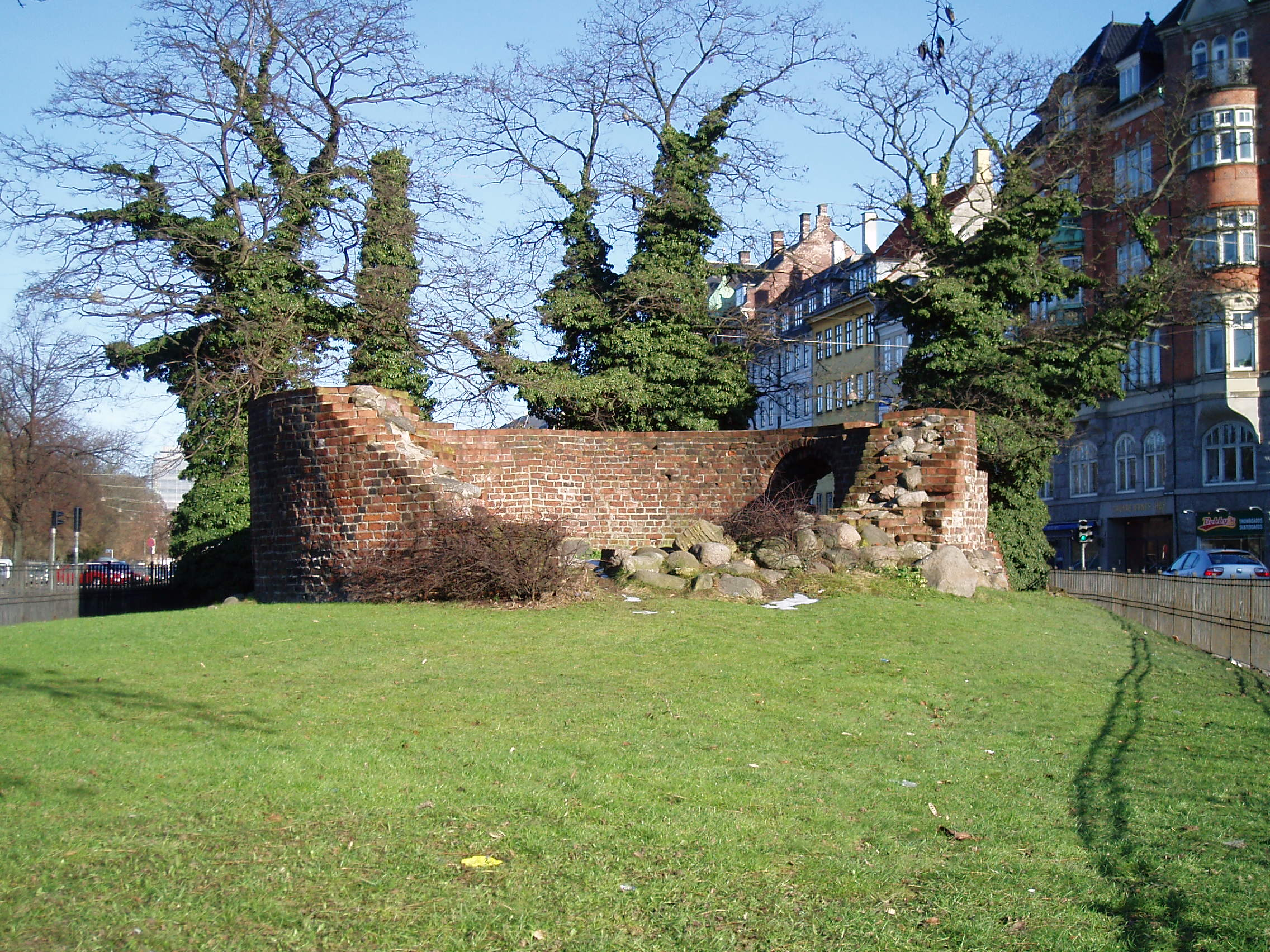
- Jarmer's Tower

- Location within Copenhagen

General information
- Type: Tower
- Location: Copenhagen, Denmark
- Coordinates: 55°40′43.7″N 12°33′55.8″E
- Completed: 16th century

Jarmer's Tower (Danish: Jarmers Tårn) is an old ruined tower in Copenhagen, Denmark. It was once part of the Copenhagen moat. Jarmers Tower represents the remains of the original eleven towers which were once joined together as a part of the city’s medieval fortification.

== History ==
The tower was built in the beginning of the 16th century. The tower is named after Jaromar II of Rügen (ca. 1218-1260), Fürst of the Wends, who in 1259 had attacked and penetrated the wooden palisades which had formed the fortification surrounding Copenhagen. Jaromar acted in support of Jakob Erlandsen, Archbishop of Lund, in his conflict with Danish King Christoffer I. King Christoffer had strongly resisted the archbishop’s efforts of adjusting the legislation and juridical right of the Danish church with canonical law. After an incarceration of the Bishop, Jaromar ravaged Zealand during 1259 and broke through Copenhagen's fortifications in the place where Jarmers Tower was later built. Wends warriors destroyed the city by burning down most of the houses and ended up by demolishing the castle of Bishop Absalon on Slotsholmen.

== Modern usage ==
The tower was built of large, red monk bricks and ornamented with a reticular pattern of dark burned bricks. Between 1880-1885 the rampart area around Jarmers Tower was excavated and the moat leveled in connection with the Nordic Exhibition of 1888. Jarmers Tower was subsequently restored and preserved as a ruin. The plaza built around the excavation where Nørre Voldgade becomes H.C. Andersens Boulevard has been named Jarmers Plads.

== See also ==
- Fortifications of Copenhagen (17th century)
