= Gavnø =

Island in Denmark

Coordinates: 55°11′19″N 11°43′28″E

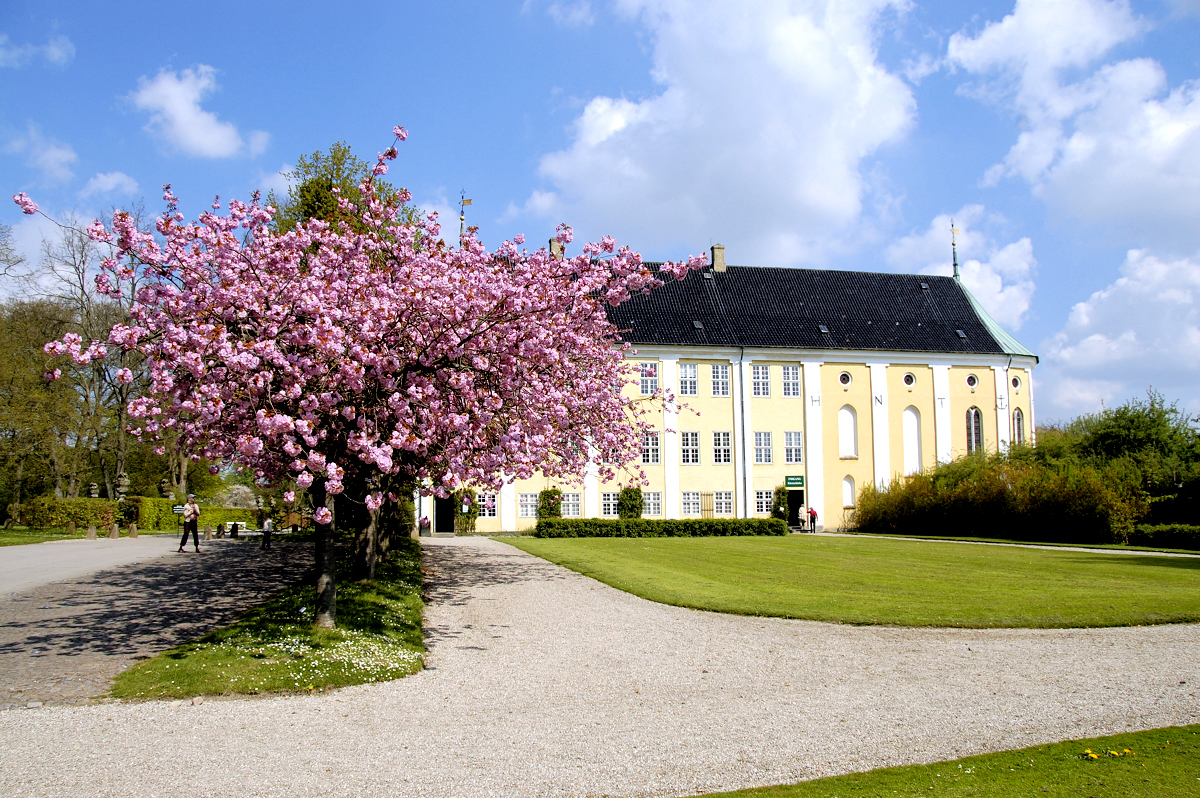
- Gavnø Castle

Geography
- Location: Baltic Sea
- Area: 5.5 km^{2} (2.1 sq mi)

Administration
- Denmark
- Region: Region Zealand
- Municipality: Næstved Municipality

Demographics
- Population: 37 (2010)
- Pop. density: 6.7/km^{2} (17.4/sq mi)

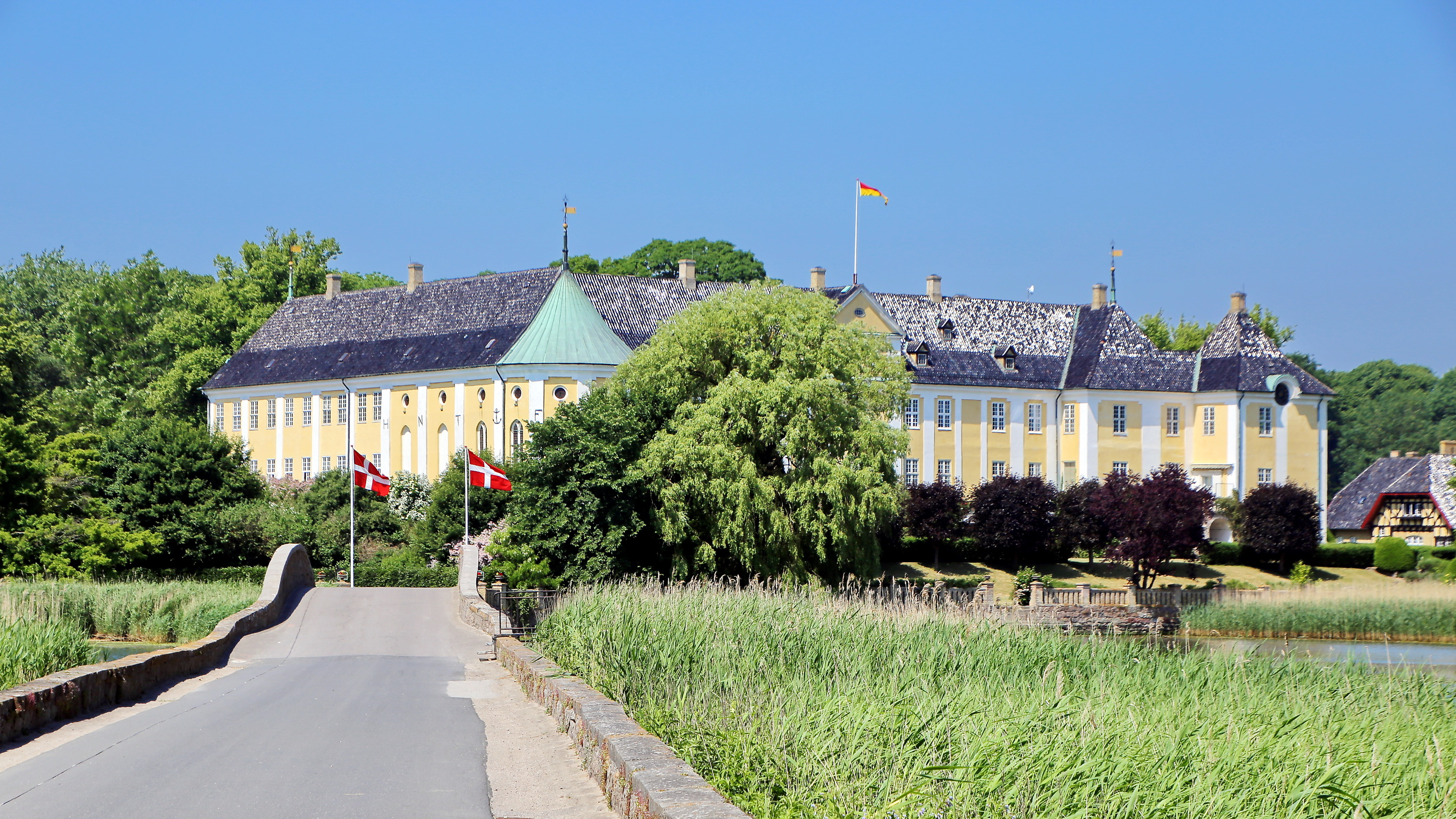
Gavnø Castle (view from bridge side)

Gavnø is a small island off the west coast of Zealand in Næstved Municipality, Denmark. Located some 6 km south-west of Næstved, it has an area of 5.6 km^{2}, and, as of 1 January 2010, it has a population of 57. The name comes from Gapnø (Gap Island) as the straight between the island and Zealand was named Karlsgap.

== Gavnø Castle ==
Gavnø is now associated mainly with Gavnø Castle, an impressive Rococo manor house with an attractive park. The park surrounding the estate is known for its rare trees, rose garden and, above all, its extensive display of bulbs.

The first historical mention of Gavnø is in King Valdemar's census book from 1231. The main building was built in 1402-1408, expanded in 1584-1663-1682 and remodeled to the current Rococo manor in 1755-1758. The manor house was apparently built to defend Denmark's western coasts. In the 15th century, Queen Margaret I opened St Agnes' Priory there, catering for nuns from aristocratic families. The chapel can still be seen in the castle's southern wing although it has since been extended.

In 1737, Count Otto Thott (1703–1785) acquired Gavnø. He renovated and substantially extended the manor, creating today's three-winged, yellow-façaded building in the Rococo style where he was able to house his large collections of paintings, manuscripts and books. At his death, his library collection contained over 120,000 volumes, exceeding that of the Danish National Library.

== List of owners ==
- (1205-1231) Sankt Peders Kloster
- (1231-1330) The Crown
- (1330-1340) Marqvard von Stove
- (1340-1375) Hans Lykke
- (1375-1402) William Steeg
- (1402-1536) Sankt Agnete Nonnekloster
- (1536-1583) The Crown
- (1583-1605) Hans Lindenov
- (1605-1634) Holger Lindenov
- (1634-1642) Hans Lindenov
- (1642-1653) Henrik Lindenov
- (1653-1657) Sidsel Lunge, gift Lindenov
- (1657-1663) Jacob Hansen Lindenov
- (1663-1667) Niels Trolle
- (1667-1682) Helle Rosenkrantz, gift Trolle
- (1682-1702) Knud Thott
- (1702-1703) Ursula Marie Putbus, gift Thott
- (1703-1716) Jytte Dorthe Thott, gift Gøye
- (1703-1730) Sophie Thott
- (1703-1736) Anna Hedevig Thott, gift Brahe
- (1736-1737) Birgitte Skeel, gift Krabbe
- (1737) Iver Rosenkrantz, Birgitte Restorff and Otto Thott
- (1737-1785) Otto Thott
- (1785-1797) Holger Reedtz-Thott
- (1797-1862) Otto Reedtz-Thott
- (1862-1923) Kjeld Thor Tage Otto Reedtz-Thott
- (1923-1927) Otto Reedtz-Thott
- (1927-1941) Holger Gustav Tage Reedtz-Thott
- (1941-1961) Axel Gustav Tage Reedtz-Thott
- (1961- ) Gavnø Fonden (main building)
- (1961-1973) Axel Gustav Tage baron Reedtz-Thott (Avlsgården og land)
- (1973- )Otto Tage Henrik Axel baron Reedtz-Thott (Svlsgården land)

== See also ==
- Basnæs
