= Københavns Møllestensfabrik og Møllebyggeri =

Danish construction company

Københavns Møllestensfabrik og Møllebygger

Københavns Møllestensfabrik og Møllebyggeri was a company specializing in construction of windmills and watermills as well as the manufacturing of mill stones.

== History ==
Københavns Møllestensfabrik was founded by Ferdinand Jensen (1844–1898) on 10 November 1868. The company was located on Toldbodvej (now Esplanaden). Jensen had recently returned from Germany and France where he had worked for some of the leading manufacturers of mill stones. The French mill stones were very sought after in Denmark at the time.

The growing company soon relocated to new and larger premises on Norgesgade (now Bredgade). It also started an import of Rheinich mill stones and later established a production of artificial mill stones. In 1775, Jensen established a sister company in Malmö.

The company was represented and won medals at a number of international exhibitions: 1879 (Berlin), 1880 (Malmø), 1888 (København), 1896 (Malmø), and 1897 (Stockholm).

When the company's factory in Norgesgade also became too small, it relocated to a new site at Vodroffsvej 61 in Frederiksberg. A new factory was built in 1890. The ground floor contained the workshop. The first floor was used for offices and design studio. Hensen's father lived in an apartment on the second floor. Ferdinand Jensen lived with his family on the other side of the street in No. 56.

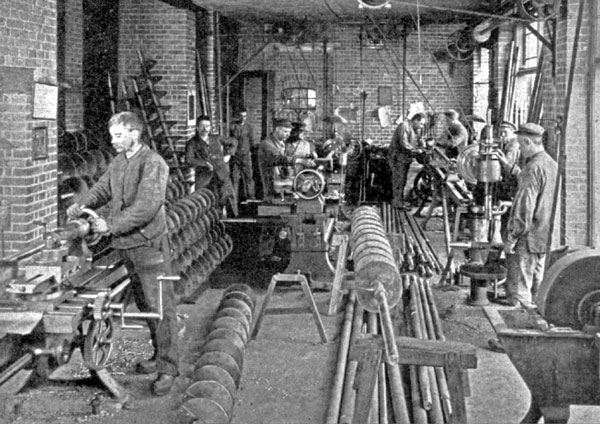
The workshop in 1903

Ferdinand Jensen died from a stroke on 19 November 1898. The company was then continued by his widow Agnes Elisabeth Jensen (née Grønberg) until 1916 in a partnership with Carl Hemmerth who served as managing director. The company received more medals on international exhibitions in 1901 (Gefle), 1903 (Helsingborg), 1906 (Norköbing) and 1907 (Lund).

It was converted into a limited company (aktieselskab) in 1921. On 17 May 1922, it was merged with N. Nielsen & Co., a company founded on 13 July 1871 by Niels Nielsen. The company was now located at Rentemestervej 23. Engineer Fritz Bülow-Nielsen was managing director of the company from 1932. He died in 1936 and was succeeded by Erik Wintermark (born 1915).

== Publications ==
The company published "Ferdinand Jensen's Handbook for the Mill Industry" ("Ferd. Jensens Haandbog i Mølleindustrien") in 1893. In 1994, Jesen published a 75-page, bilingual (Danish and Swedish) "Illustreret Katalog over Maskiner og Artikler til Møllebrug fra Kjøbenhavns Møllestensfabrik og Malmø franska Qvarnstensfabrik".
