= Otto Thott =

Danish nobleman and minister of state

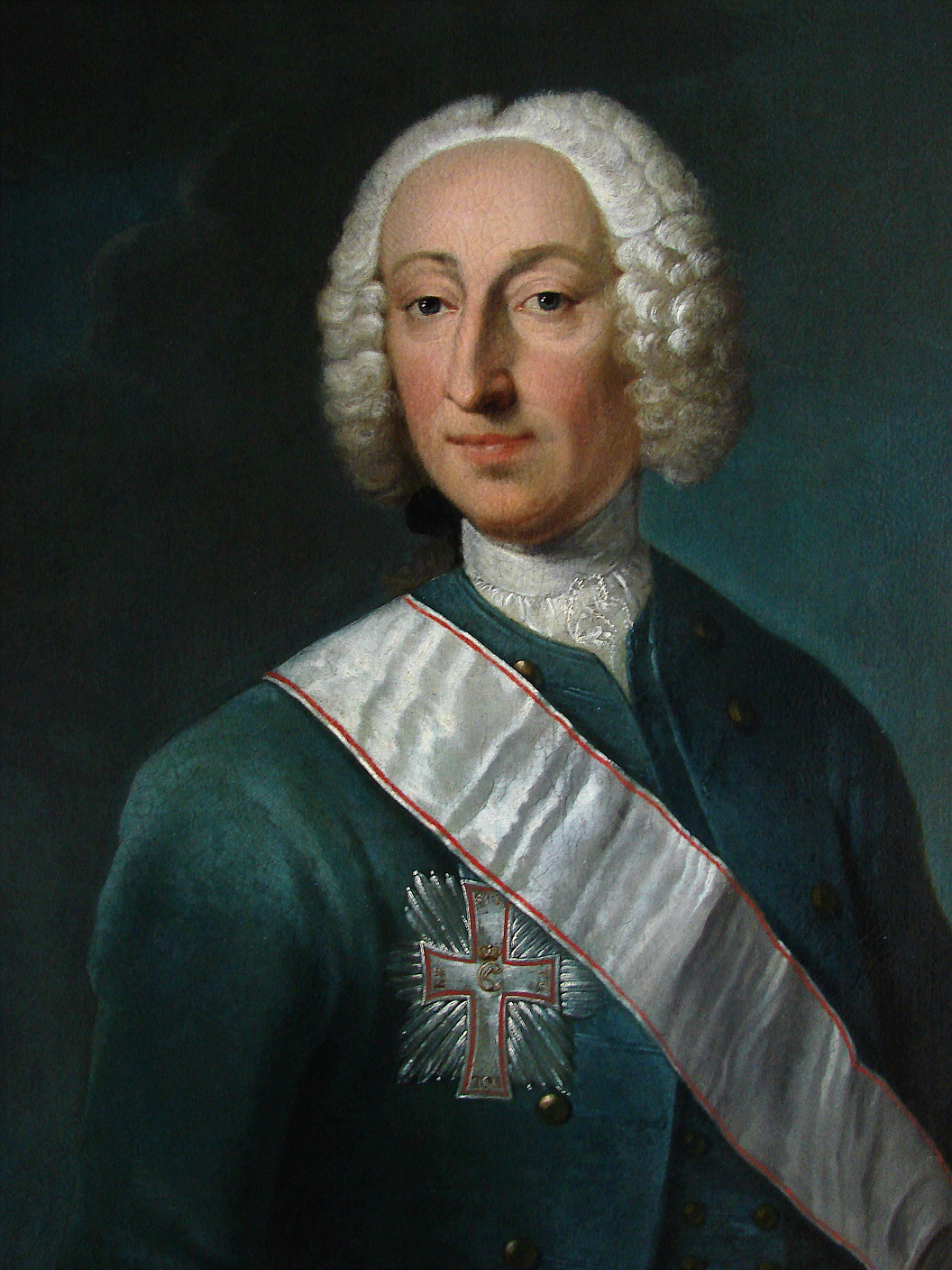
Otto Thott (1703–1785) portrait by Andreas Brünniche

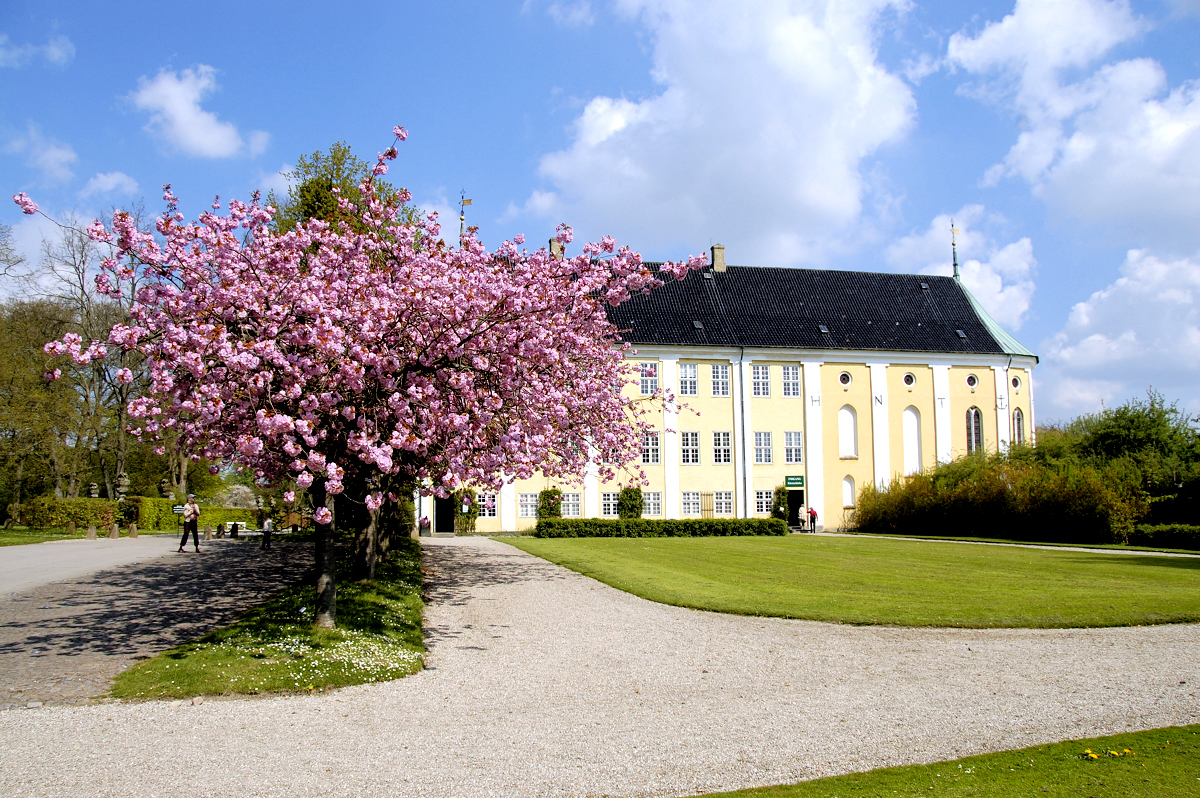
Gavnø Castle

Otto Thott (13 October 1703 – 10 September 1785) was a Danish Count, minister of state, and land owner. During his lifetime, he acquired Gavnø Castle and one of the largest private collections of book and manuscripts in Denmark.

== Early life and education ==
He was the son of Tage Thott (1648–1707), a member of the Danish Privy Council and county governor of Holbæk. After the death of his father, his mother, Petra Sophie Reedtz (1675–1720) sold the manor at Turebyholm and moved with him to Sorø, where he attended school. After the death of his mother, he was supported financially by several aunts and was able to continue his education and development abroad.

He lived for a time in Halle, where he studied history, philosophy and Jurisprudence at the University of Halle-Wittenberg. He continued these studies in the University of Jena and later during his stays in the Netherlands, England and France. Additionally, he made the acquaintance of several scientists in the various towns where he stayed and managed to acquire a number of valuable manuscripts and books.

== Career ==
In 1723, upon his return to Denmark, he obtained a secretary position in the Danish Chancellery. On 30 August 1746 he came to lead the College of Finance as the 1st deputy, a post he held until 6 December 1759. He led during a time in which he succeeded in paying down the government debt. In 1758 he join the State Council (gehejmekonseillet). In February 1763, he succeeded Johan Ludvig Holstein as Minister of Finance and secretary of the Danish Chancellor.

Shortly after King Frederick V's accession to the throne, he had received the Order of the Dannebrog and in 1747 was made a member of the Danish Privy Council. In 1752, Dowager Queen Sophie Magdalene (1700–1770) awarded him the Ordre de l'Union Parfaite.

== Book collector ==
In 1737, Otto Thott bought St. Agnes' Priory on the island of Gavnø. From 1755–1758, he modernized the estate turning it into the rococo palace later known as Gavnø Castle.

Otto Thott acquired most of the library of Edward Harley (1689–1741) after the latter's death. The library of Otto Thott contained 138,000 volumes at his death in 1785. It was one of the largest private libraries of the 18th century in Denmark.

The Royal Danish Library in Copenhagen received 4,154 manuscripts and 6,159 early printed books, of which 1,500 were incunabula. Further, the library bought about 60,000 volumes at the auction sale.

== Personal life ==
In 1732, he married Birgitte Charlotte Kruse (1711–1781) a daughter of Major General Ulrik Christian Kruse (1666–1727). Otto Thott died during 1785. Both he and his wife were buried at Sorø Klosterkirke.

== See also ==
- Daniel Gotthilf Moldenhawer
- Thott Palace
- Gavnø
