= Kongens Nytorv =

Public square in Copenhagen, Denmark

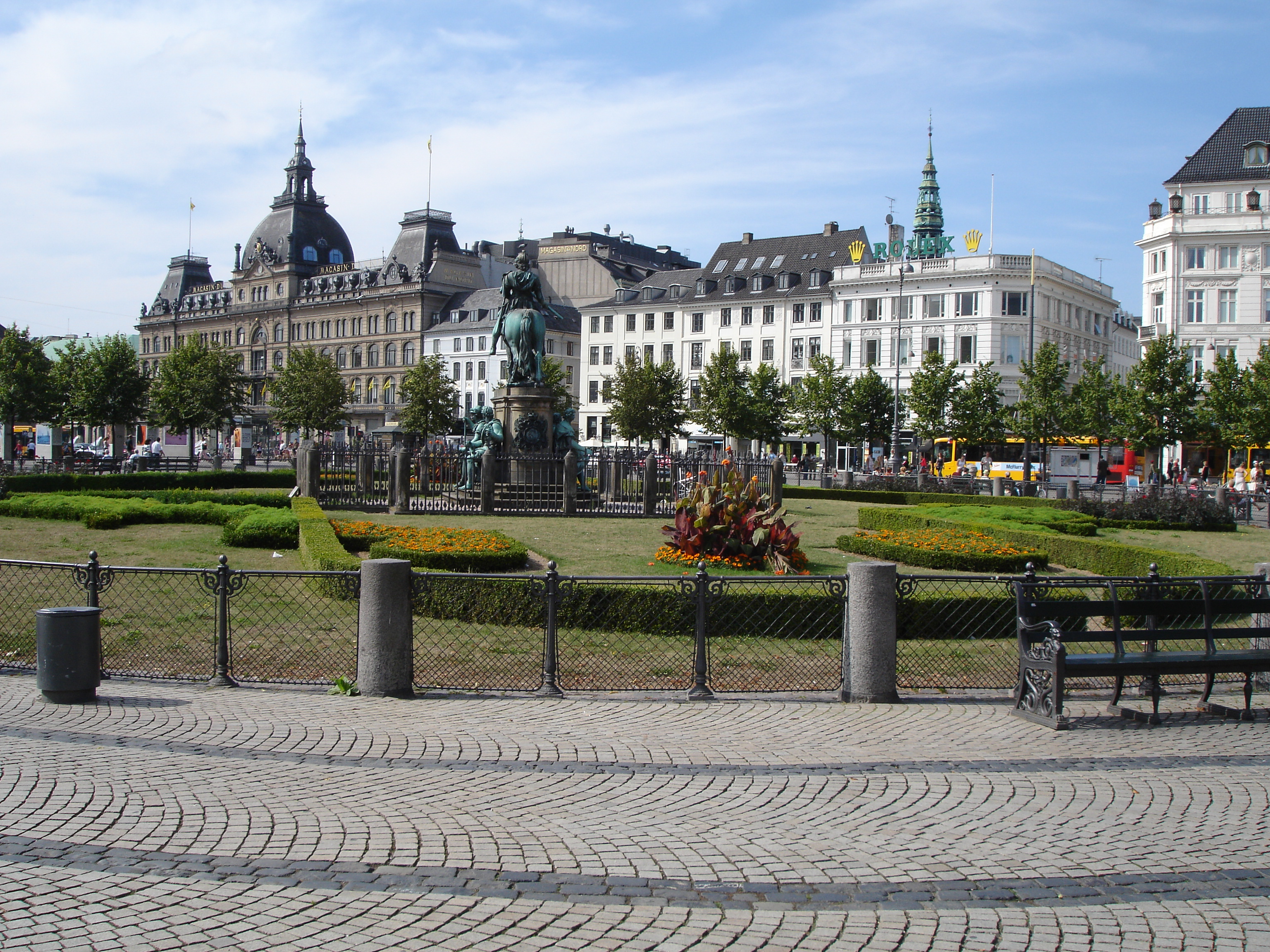
- Kongens Nytorv
- Interactive map of Kongens Nytorv
- Location: Indre By, Copenhagen, Denmark
- Postal code: 1050, 1051
- Nearest metro station: Kongens Nytorv
- Coordinates: 55.680563°N 12.585938°E

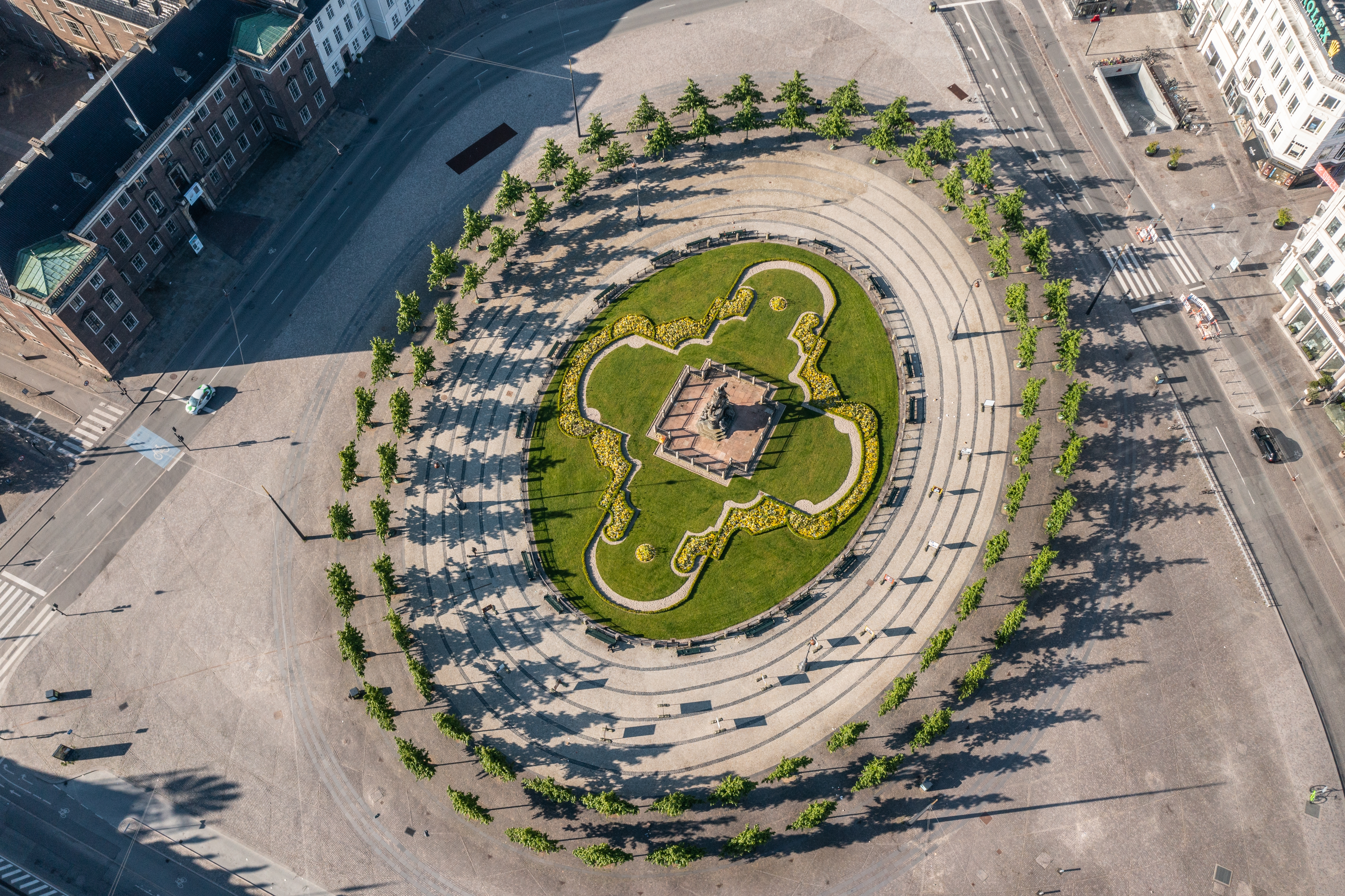
Aerial image of the square

Kongens Nytorv (lit. "The King's New Square") is a public square in Copenhagen, Denmark, centrally located at the end of the pedestrian street Strøget. The largest square of the city, it was laid out by Christian V in 1670 in connection with a major extension of the fortified city, and has an equestrian statue of him at its centre. The initiative moved the centre of the city from the medieval area around Gammeltorv, at that time a muddy medieval marketplace, to a cobbled new square with a garden complex, inspired by the Royal city planning seen in Paris from the early 17th century.

Important buildings facing the square include the Royal Danish Theater from 1874, the Charlottenborg Palace from 1671 (now the Royal Danish Academy of Fine Arts), the Thott Palace from 1683 (now the French Embassy), the Hotel D'Angleterre and the Magasin du Nord department store.

== History ==
=== New Copenhagen ===
In the beginning of the 17th century, the area later to become Kongens Nytorv was located outside the Fortifications of Copenhagen, as the eastern section of the ramparts, Østervold, ran along the western edge of the current square, with the eastern city gate, Østerport, located at the end of the street Østergade. Outside the gate, an undulating terrain extended towards the sea. As part of Christian IV's ambitious plans to strengthen Copenhagen as a regional centre, he wanted to double the area of the fortified city, he acquired 200 hectares of land outside Østerport in 1606. To protect the new city district, called New Copenhagen (Danish: Ny København) or Saint Anne's Town (Danish: Sankt Annæ By), he started construction of a redoubt, Saint Anne's Post (Danish: Sankt Annæ Skanse), at the site later to become Kastellet. In 1627 a customs house was added at the site. In the beginning of the 1640s the old Østervold was abandoned altogether in favour of the new ramparts further north, and the location of the King's new square, Kongens Nytorv, was decided in 1647 with the construction of the street Gothersgade in 1647. According to a masterplan from created by the fortification engineer Axel Urups, Kongens Nytorv was to be connected to the sea by a canal.

=== Creating the square ===
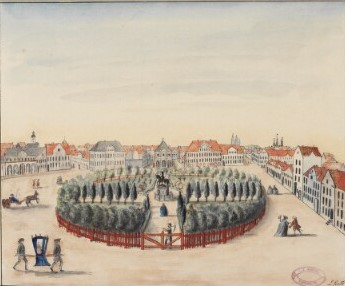
Kongens Nytorv, anno 1715

At this time, under the reign of Frederik III, the site was a chaotic area, dominated by remains of the old ramparts and piles of garbage, almost made unpassable when wet weather transformed it into a muddy morass. Due to the topography and obstructed character of the premises, the site was popularly known as Hallandsåsen, a reference to the horst by the same name which had to be traversed when traveling from Scania and Halland.

Shortly after Christian V was crowned in 1670, he decided to level and cobble the square. This decision was taken mainly for military reasons, its strategic location with almost the same distance to all points along the ramparts of the city making it well suited as a central alarm square. At the same time, the square was to serve as a place royale with inspiration from France.

=== Early buildings ===
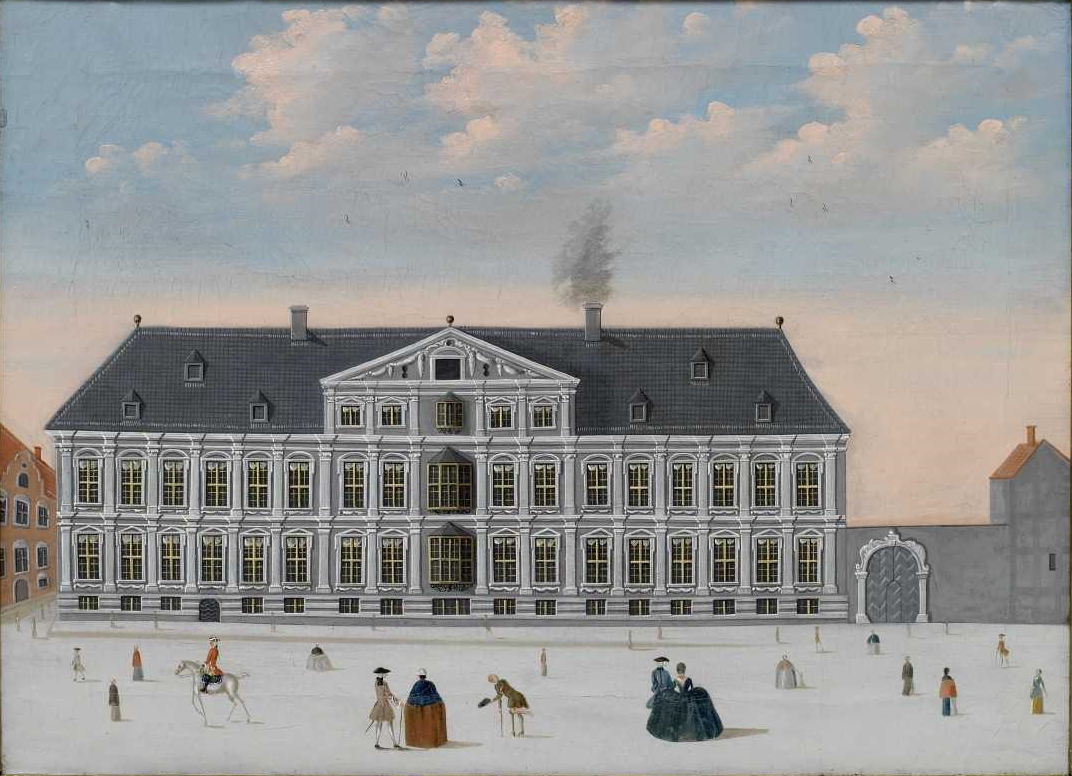
The Gran Mansion

Land around the new square was distributed among interested wealthy citizens, including people from the new ranks. Buildings facing the square were required to be in at least two stories and meet certain standards. Ulrik Frederik Gyldenløve, Christian V's half-brother, completed his Gyldenløve Mansion on the square in the mid-1780s. Admiral Henrik Bjelke constructed another town mansion on the square in the 1670s. It was in 1721 acquired by Ulrik Adolf von Holstein and was from then on known as the Holstein Mansion (Danish: Holsteins Palæ). The Juel Mansion was completed for the naval officer Niels Juel in 1683. Carl Christian von Gram was also the owner of a town mansion om the square.

In 1688, a Baroque garden complex with trees around a parterre and a gilded equestrian statue of Christian V in its centre, was inaugurated. In 1747 the entire square was rebuilt by Frederik V as a military drill and ceremony ground for the King's troops until 1908, where the square was re-shaped into its original design.

== Features ==
=== Equestrian statue ===
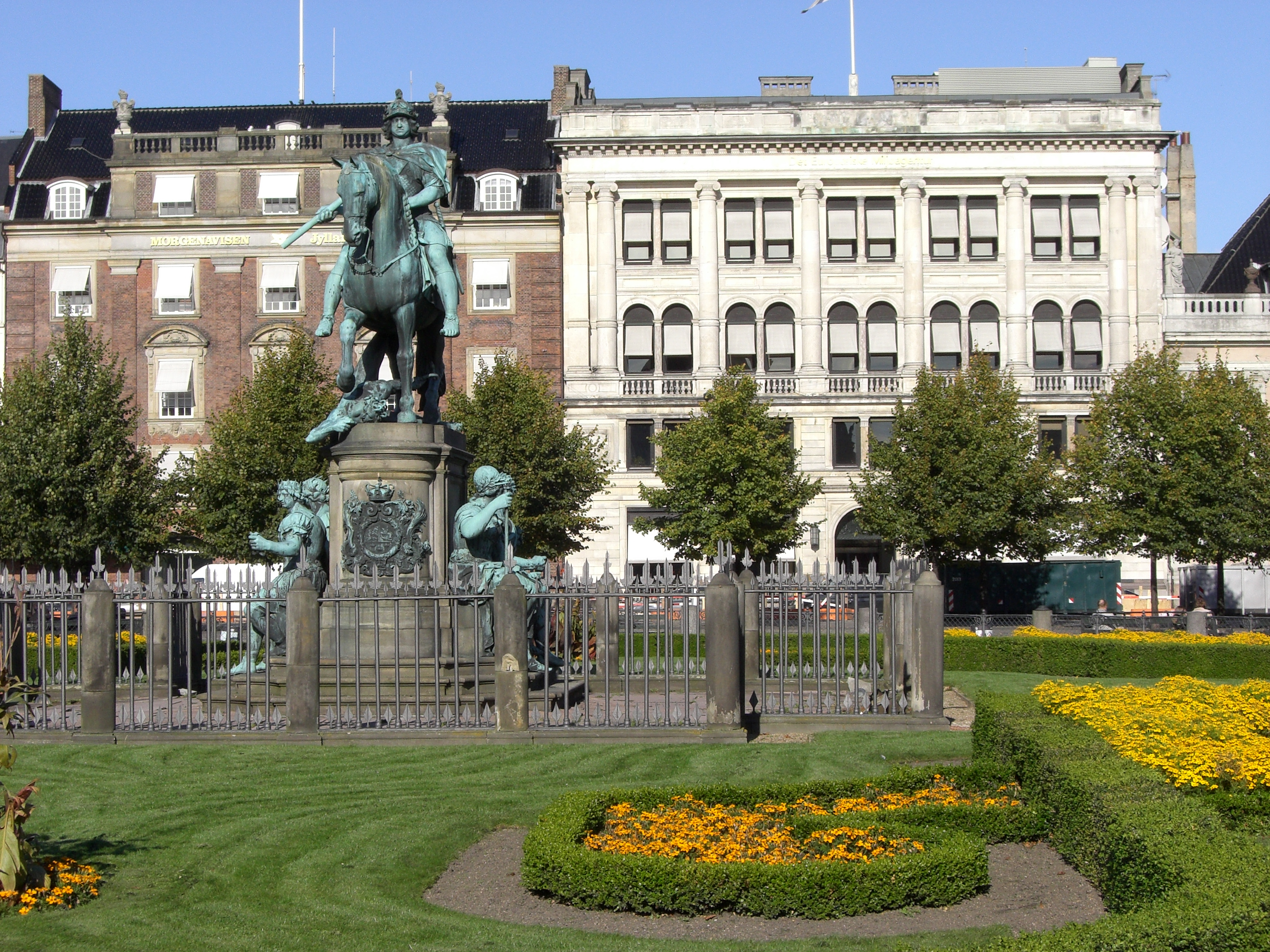
The equestrian statue of Christian V

The equestrian statue of Christian V was created by the French sculptor Abraham-César Lamoureux. Dating from 1688, it is the oldest equestrian statue in Scandinavia. Originally made in gilded lead, it was recast in bronze 1939.

With direct inspiration from the equestrian statue of Louis XIII erected at the centre of Place des Vosges in Paris in 1639, it depicts the king dressed like a Roman imperator with a Laurel wreathed helmet.

At the foot of the plinth, Lamoureux placed four allegorical statues. Facing Charlottenborg Palace stand figures of Minerva and Alexander the Great, representing prudence and fortitude, while the opposite side features statues of Herkules and Artemisia, personifications of strength and honour.

Even though Lamoureux depicted the horse in a trot-like gait, with inspiration from Marcus Aurelius' horse at the Capitoline Hill, the design caused severe problems due to the soft metal used for the casting. The construction therefore had to be strengthened, and Lamoureux introduced a figure of a naked man crouched underneath the horse's hoof, personifying envy but in the same time affording support for the horse's barrel as the weakest point of the statue. However, over the centuries the problems with the statue continued, particularly with the horse's front left leg, and finally Professor Einar Utzon-Frank from the Danish Academy of Fine Arts was commissioned to recast the statue in bronze. This happened from 1939 to 1942 and the new cast was inaugurated on 22 May 1946.

=== Krinsen garden complex ===
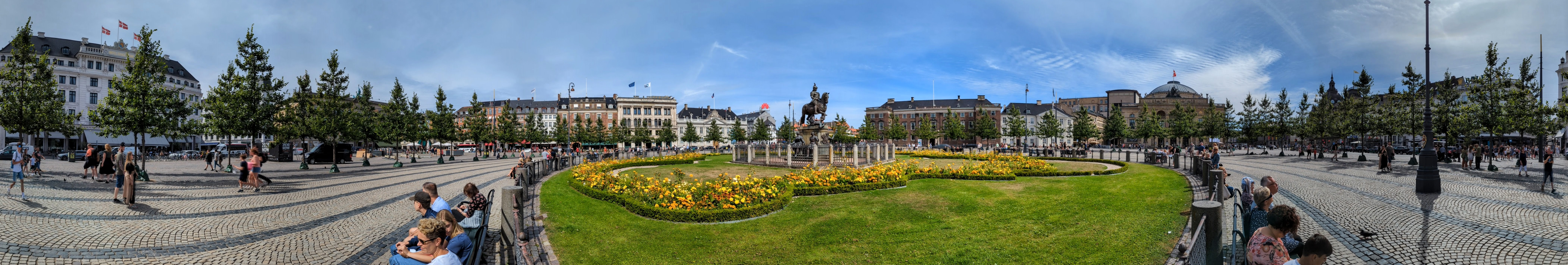
Panoramic view from the edge of the Krinsen

Krinsen is an old form of the Danish word Krans, meaning circle or wreath. It is an elliptical parterre surrounding the statue of Christian V. The ellipse was a favoured geometrical shape at the time, an obvious example bing the elliptical pattern in the paving around the Marcus Aurelius statue at Piazza del Campidoglio. Around the parterre, two rows of trees were planted. In 1711, the garden complex was remodelled, before it was given up in 1747 the garden was removed to make room for military drills, with some of the trees being dug altogether up, leaving only the equestrian statue. Some of the trees were dug up and reused for the establishment of the avenue Østre Allé. New rows of elm trees were planted around the statue in 1855–56, but by 1998 they were dying from Dutch elm disease and removed. In 2001, 80 lime trees were planted as part of a major refurbishment of the square.

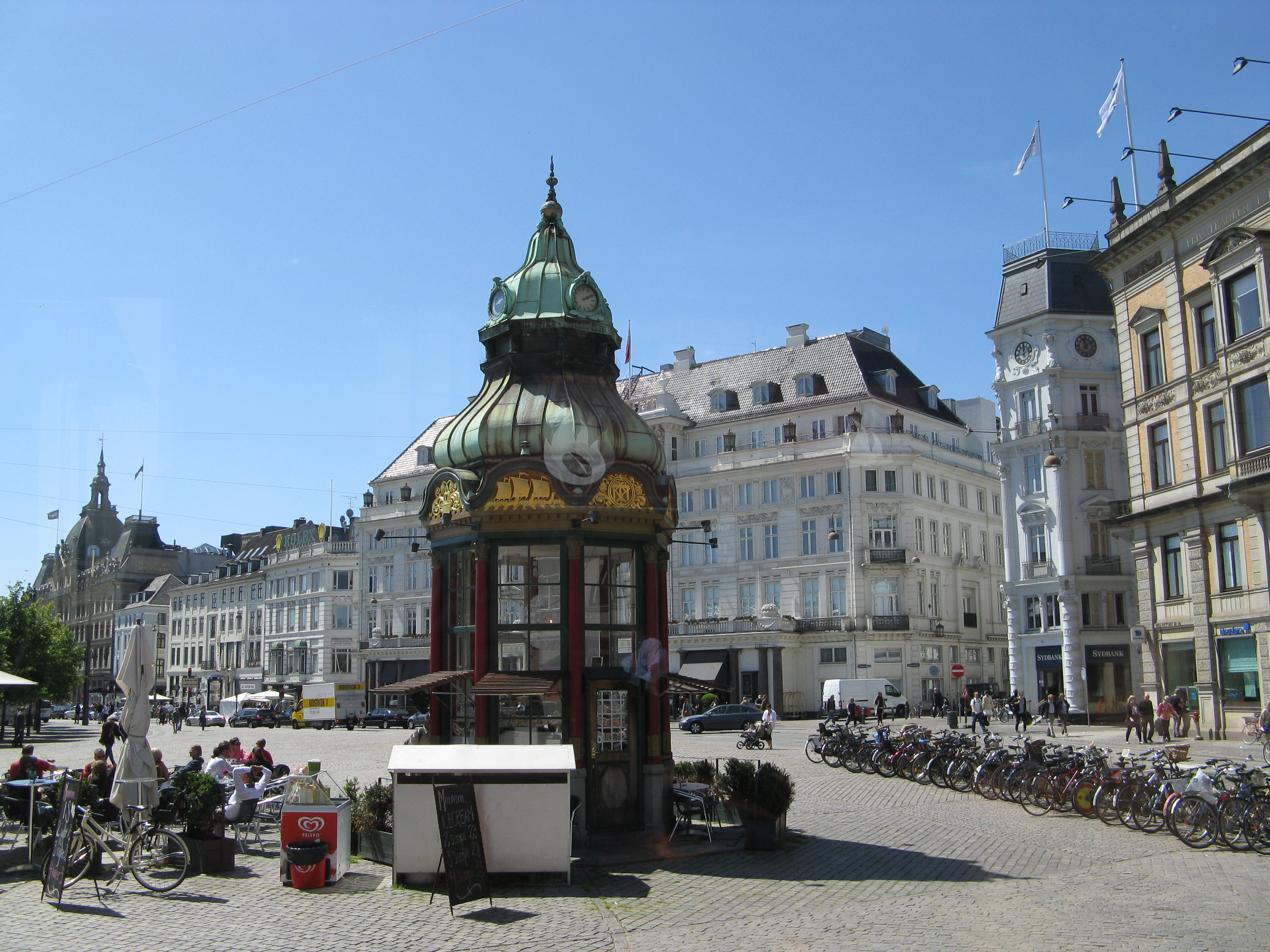
The old kiosk

=== Old kiosk ===
On the square stands an old kiosk and telephone stand from 1913. It is built in Baroque Revival style with a copper-clad roof and hand-carved ornamentation. It also used to offer the first public telephonic connection in Copenhagen from where it was possible to call every day except Sunday from 10 am to 8 pm. Today it houses a small café with outdoor service.

== Surrounding buildings ==
=== Nyhavn to Holmens kanal ===
Built 1672–1683, Charlottenborg Palace is the oldest building on the square. It is now home to the Royal Danish Academy of Fine Arts as well as the exhibition space Kunsthal Charlottenborg.

The Harsdorff House (No. 3-5) was built in 1780 to design by Caspar Frederik Harsdorff. The building's facade was to serve as a model for the many master builders of the time who had little or no academic training.

The Royal Danish Theatre's current building (No. 1) is from 1872 to 1874 and was designed by Wilhelm Dahlerup. Its Art Deco-style 1931 extension Stærekassen, which spans the street Tordenskjoldsgade, was built both as an extension of the theatre and a new home for Danmarks Radio.

=== Nyhavn to Gothersgade ===
The Thott Mansion (No. 4) is from 1683 and is now home to the French Embassy. No. 8 was built for A. P. Moller-Maersk Group in 10+9 and the shipping company was headquartered in the building until 1979. Jyllands-Posten's Copenhagen office was then based in the building until 2010.

The Lihme House (No. 18) is from 1787.

=== Gothersgad to Holmens Kanale ===
No. 26 was built for the Great Northern Telegraph Company in 1898. The company was headquartered in the building until 2008. The building is from 1767. Hotel D'Angleterre (No. 34) is one of the oldest and most prestigious hotels in Copenhagen. The current building is from 1874)

Magasin du Nord (No. 13), a leading department, opened in 1893–94. Hviids Vinstue (No. 19) is the oldest tavern in Copenhagen.

== Use ==
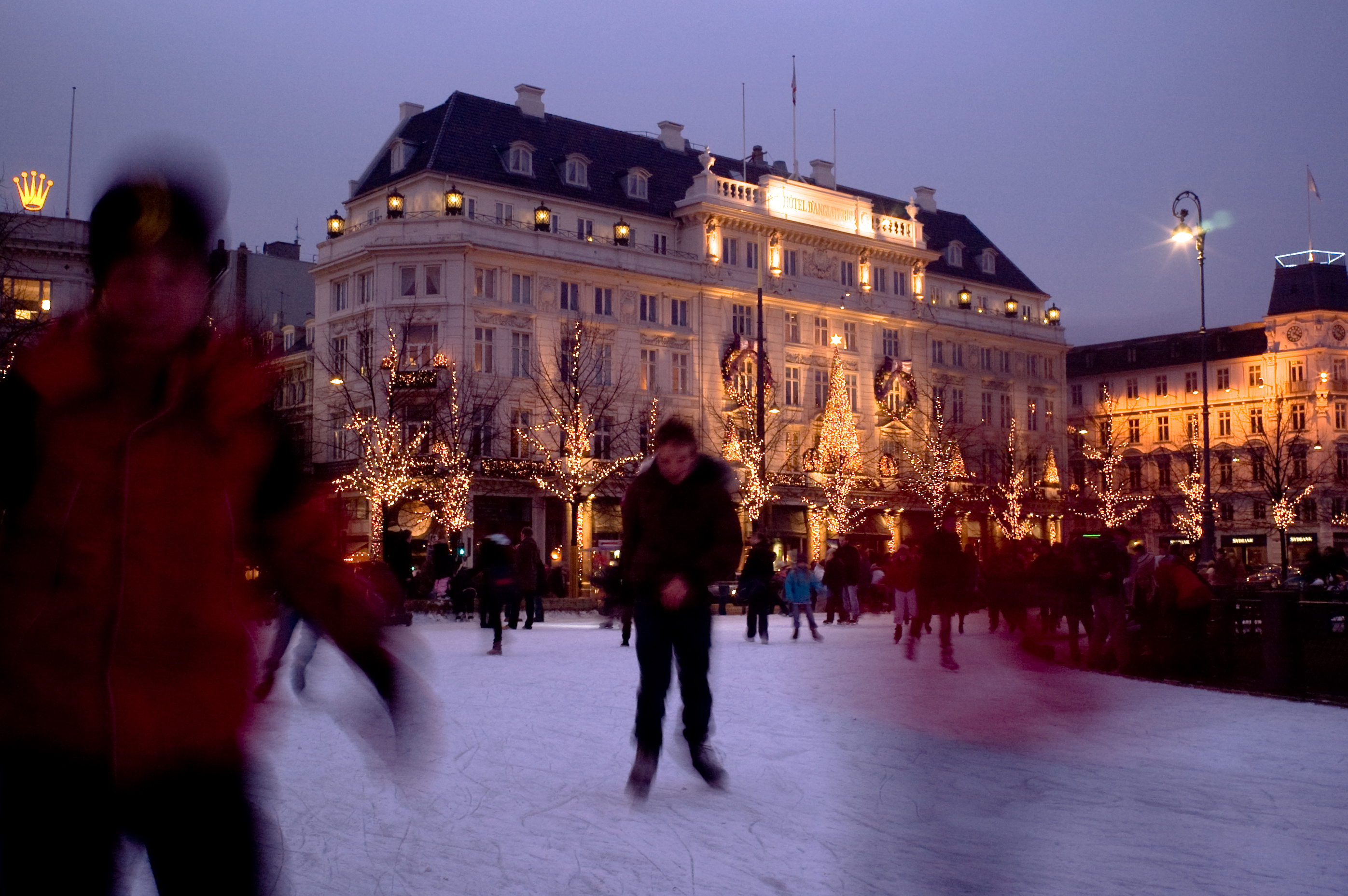
Skaters at Kongens nytorv

=== Outdoor exhibition space ===
The square is frequently used as an open-air exhibition venue, especially for photo exhibitions.

=== Ice skating rink ===
In winter a 2,200 m^{2} (23,681 sq ft) circular ice skating rink is constructed around Krinsen. Skating is free of charge and ice skate rental is available.

=== High school graduation celebrations ===
As an old tradition, graduating high school students from the Copenhagen area, when they graduate in June, come to Kongens Nytorv in buses, trucks or horse wagons to dance and run around Krinsen, throwing their graduation caps into the air, celebrating their graduation.

== Bibliography ==
- Hartmann, Sys; Hartmann, Godfred (1988). "Bind 5: Kgs. Nytorv, Rosenborg og Nyboder". In Bramsen, Bo (ed.). København, før og nu - og aldrig (in Danish). Copenhagen: Forlaget Palle Fogtdal. ISBN 87-7248-033-5.
