= Royal Danish Horticultural Society's Garden =

Park in Frederiksberg Municipality, Denmark

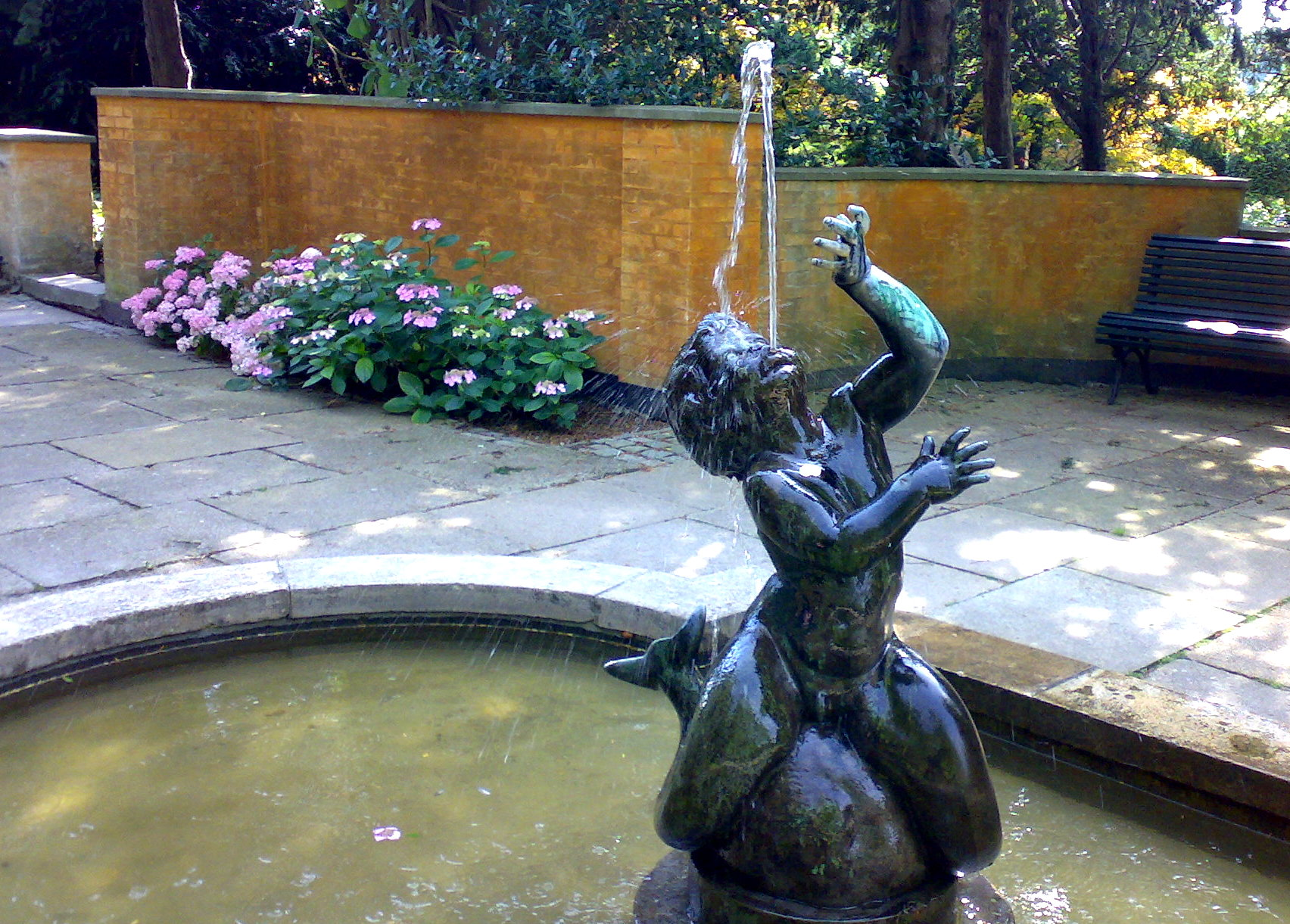
- Interactive map of Royal Danish Horticultural Society's Garden
- Type: Inspirational garden
- Location: Frederiksberg, Copenhagen
- Coordinates: 55°40′25″N 12°31′52″E
- Area: 1.4 hectares
- Created: 1882
- Owner: Danish Horticultural Society's

The Royal Danish Horticultural Society's Garden (Danish Det Kongelige Danske Haveselskabs Have) is a garden in the Frederiksberg district of Copenhagen, Denmark operated by the Danish Horticultural Society as a source of inspiration for its members as well as other people with an interest in gardening. It is situated on Frederiksberg Runddel, just left of the main entrance to Frederiksberg Gardens.

== History ==
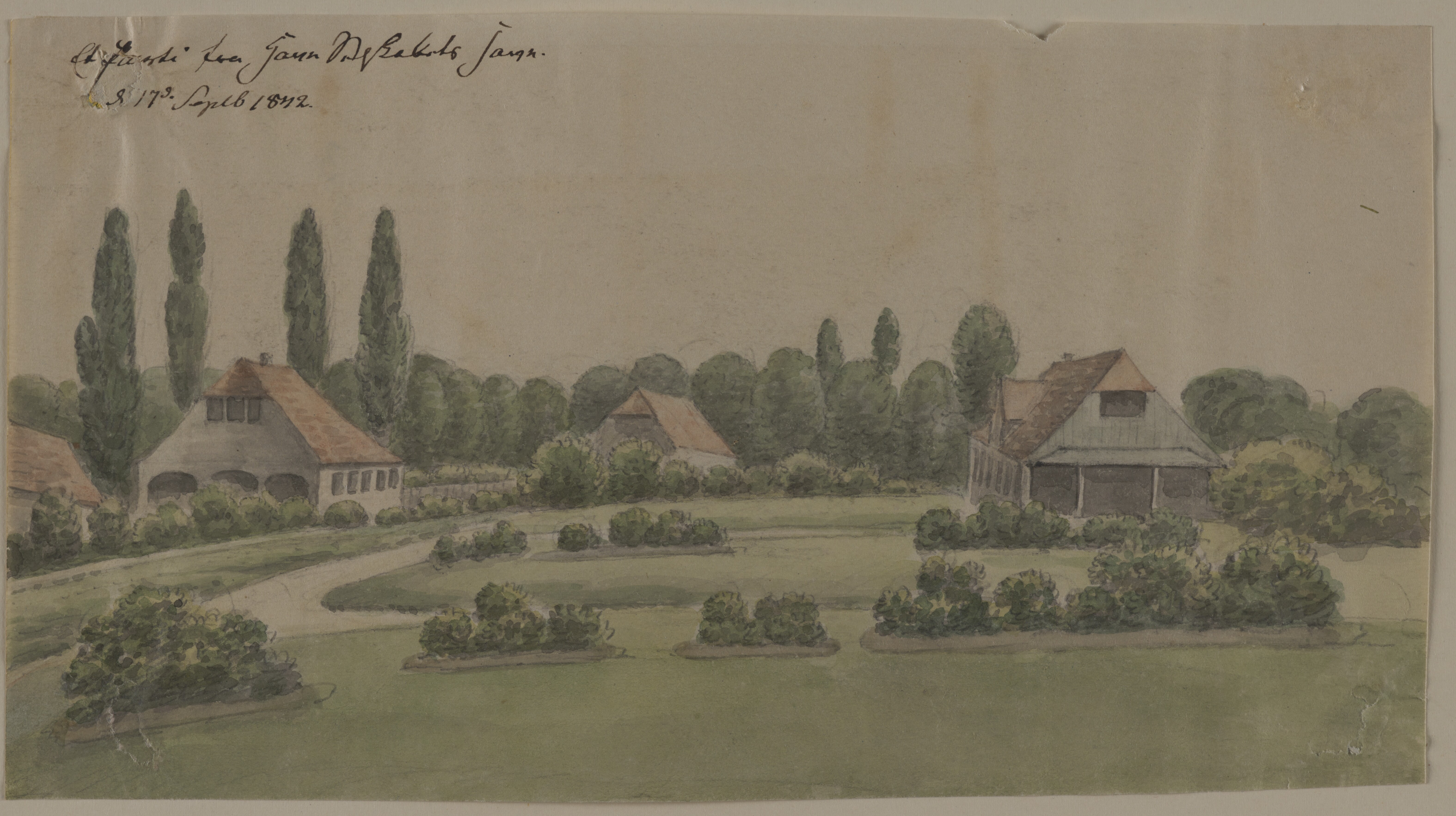
Ole Jørgen Rawert: Scene from the Royal Danish Horticultural Society's Garden, 17 September 1842

The Royal Danish Horticultural Society's first garden was located further down Frederiksberg Allë, at present day Haveforeningsvej which was named for it. In 1882 it moved to its current location, on land which used to be part of Frederiksberg Palace's nursery and vegetable garden. The former palace gardens had just opened to the public after a century as the private domain of the Danish royal family. The new garden was designed by the prominent landscape architect Henrik August Flindt who around the same time also designed Ørstedsparken, University of Copenhagen Botanical Garden and Østre Anlæg in the grounds of the so-called Fortification Ring, the land which had until then been occupied by the city's now decommissioned Bastioned Fortifications.

Over the years, different areas have gradually been restored and redesigned by some of the leading Danish landscape architects of their day.

From 2001 to 2010 Jane Schul was director and principal architect of the garden. He has designed a section dedicated to different grasses (1992), a water garden and a perennials garden.

== Buildings ==
=== Well House ===
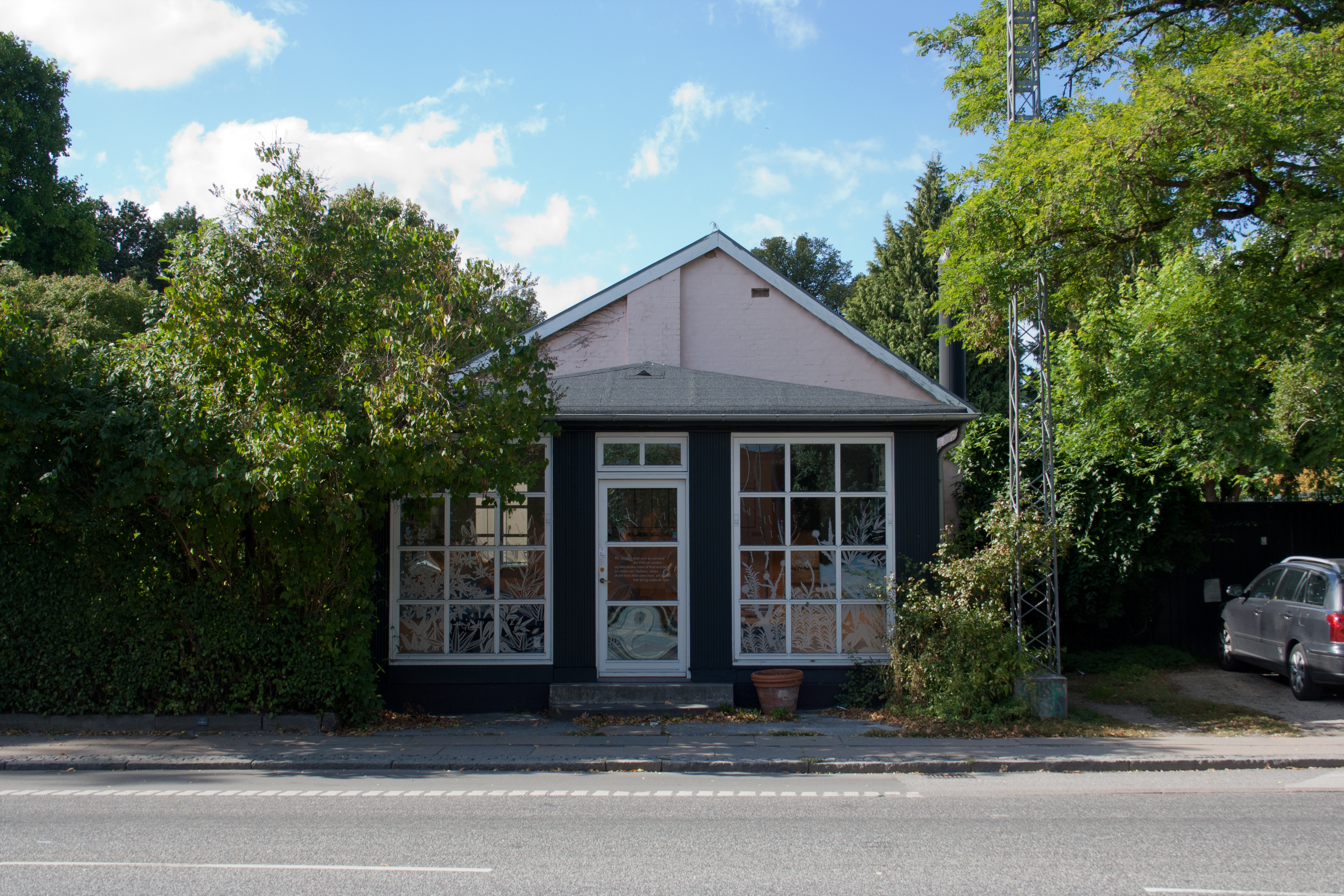
The Well House

Brøndsalen (English: The Well Hall) is from 1885 and was built around a well where members of the local bourgeoisie came to sample water with supposed healing properties before taking a stroll in the gardens. The water was thought to be good for health as well as for the digestion. This activity took place from 5 to 9 pm and afterwards the building was at the disposal of the Society.

The building was designed by Peter Christian Bønecke. He had previously designed J. C. Jacobsen's winter garden Pompei at the Carlsberg site and the Palm House in Copenhagen Botanical Gardens and the Horticultural Society specifically requested a building in the style of an Orangerie which would blend in with the surroundings.

The co-existence was not free of complications and in 1909 the Horticultural Society acquired full ownership of the Well Hall, after which it was used for exhibitions and various other activities for its members.

=== Paradehuset ===
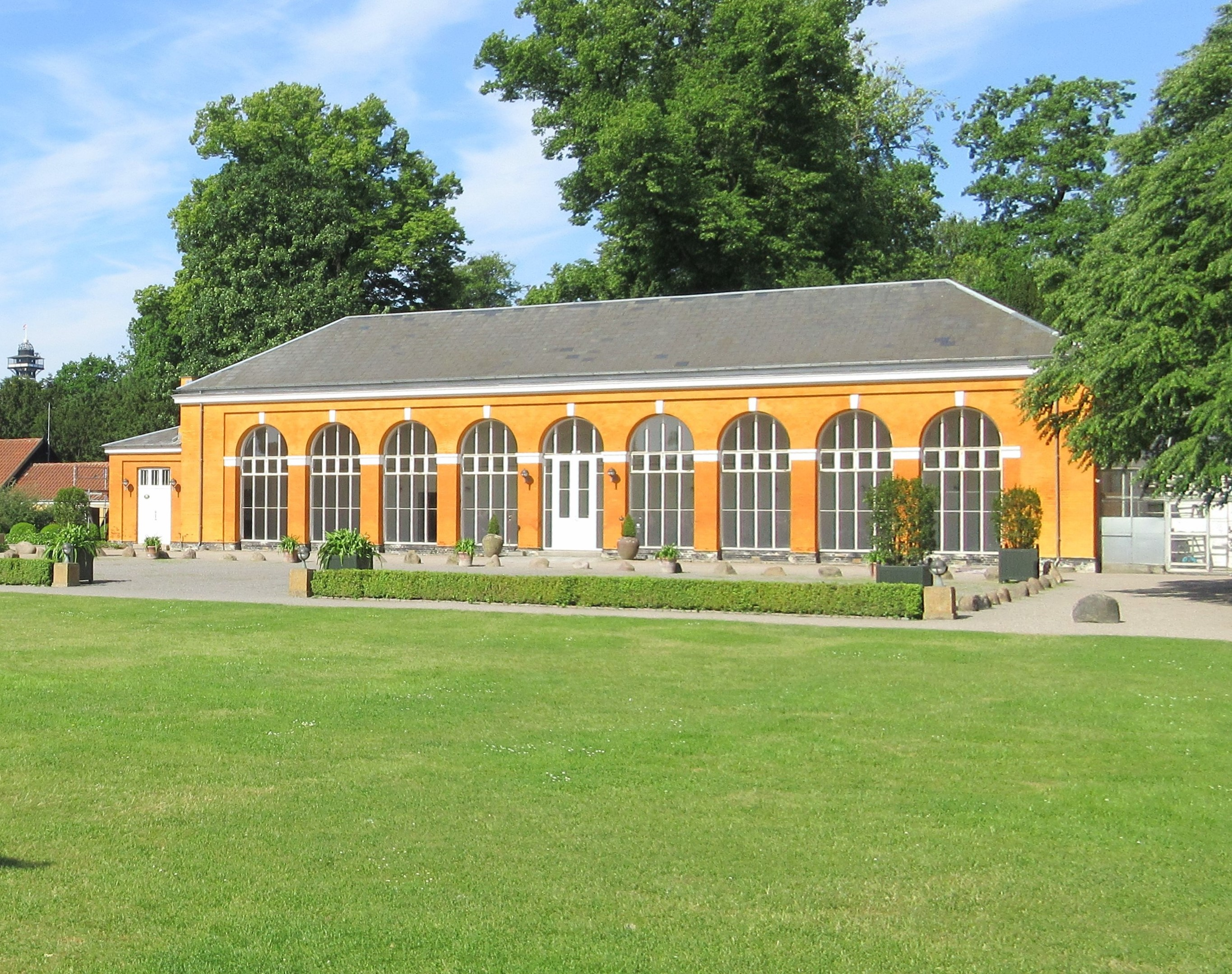
Paradehuset

Paradehuset (English:The Conservatory) is one of the oldest greenhouses in the Copenhagen and traces its history back to the time when the area was still part of the palace gardens.

When the Horticultural Society took over the site in 1882, one of the palace's old wineries was converted into a paradehus, a place for the exhibition of its many fine greenhouse plants.

The building was modelled on the conservatories at Rosenborg Castle's vegetable gardens, with a long glass facade and roof facing south and a slate roof and workspaces to the north. Over the years, the building has undergone considerable alterations, most significantly in 1828–30 when it was extended, both in length and width, the glass gables were replaced and the current supporting iron. Later the roof under the rear side has been replaced and the entrance re-constructed.

=== Mielcke & Hurtigkarl ===
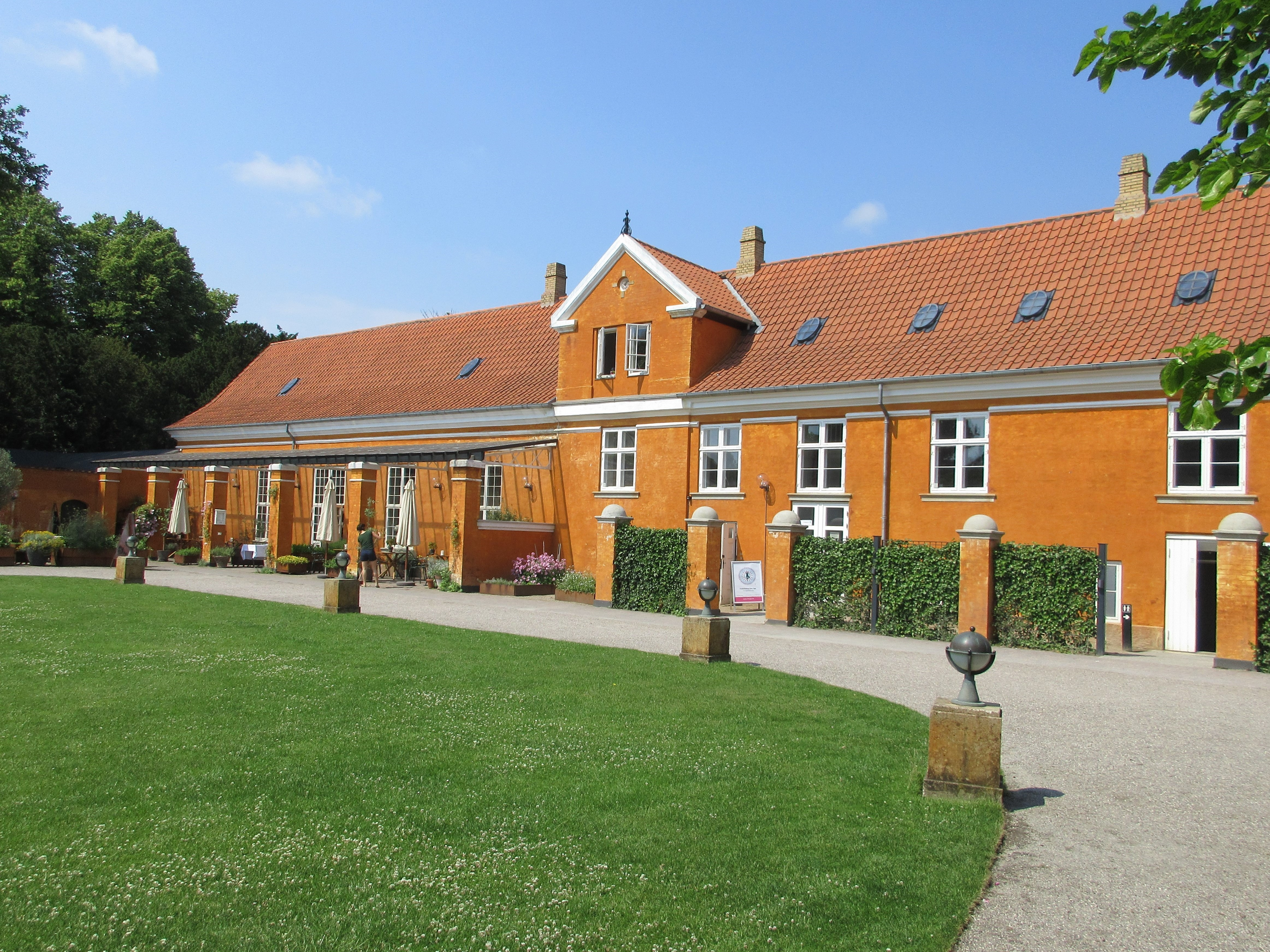
Restaurant Mielcke & Hurtigkarl

In 2008 the chefs Jakob Mielcke Hansen and Jan Hurtigkarl opened the experimental gourmet restaurant Mielcke & Hurtigkarl in a listed 19th-century building inside the gardens. The designers Henrik Vibskov, Margrethe Odgaard and others has created the avantgardistic interior design.

Contrary to the dominating trend in Danish gourmet cuisine, the restaurant is known for its innovative use of exotic ingredients from around the world. It offers an eight course avant garde menu and a classical four course menu and has received acclaim from Danish food critics. The restaurant has also hosted outdoor events with music and free food in the gardens.

== The garden today ==
The garden is open to visitors all day seven days a week and free of charge. The Well Hall still plays host to a long line of activities, including a popular, annual Christmas market, and various activities for members such as lectures and plant-swapping events.
