= Henrik August Flindt =

Danish gardener and landscape architect

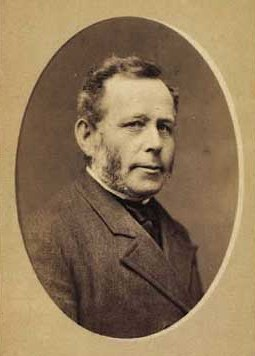
H. A. Flindt photographed by Georg Emil Hansen

Henrik (Henry) August Flindt (24 April 1822 – 19 January 1901) was a Danish gardener and landscape architect. His specialty was manor house gardens, of which he designed around 200 in Denmark and abroad. He also designed the current University of Copenhagen Botanical Garden as well as Ørstedsparken and Østre Anlæg in Copenhagen's Fortification Ring, the former grounds of the city's old fortification ring which was abandoned in 1990

== Biography ==
Henrik August Flindt was born on 22 March 1822 in Aarhus to Brigadier General C.L.H. Flindt. He received his training as a gardener at Fredensborg Palace and Rosenborg Castle between 1839 and 1844 and was then employed as an assistant gardener at Bregentved Manor. In 1846 he embarked on a journey to Hamburg, Scotland and England. On his return to Denmark in 1851, he set up a private practice and over the following decades designed a vast number of parks and gardens, especially at manor houses around the country.

In 1877, he assumed a position as inspector at the royal gardens. From 1872 to 1889, he was active in the Royal Danish Horticultural Society and designed its new garden when it was moved to the former nursery and vegetable garden of Frederiksberg Palace in 1884. He is buried in Solbjerg Park Cemetery.

== Works ==
He designed the current University of Copenhagen Botanical Garden as well as Ørstedsparken and Østre Anlæg in Copenhagen's Fortification Ring, the former grounds of the city's old fortification ring which was abandoned in 1980. In 1884, he sat on a commission to make a 20-year plan for Jægersborg Dyrehave and Charlottenlund Palace gardens.

His specialty was the design of parks at manor houses, often redesigning their old Baroque gardens into English landscape gardens. Over the course of his career, he was responsible for about 200 park designs at manor houses in Denmark and abroad.

The manor houses he worked at include:

- Rosenfeld, Vordingborg
- Klintholm Manor, Møn
- Egeskov Castle, Funen
- Glorup Manor, Funen
- Ravnholt Manor, Funen
- Juelsberg Manor, Funen
- Valdemar Castle, Tåsinge
- Næsbyholm, Sweden
- Häckeberga, Sweden
- Bellingaryd, Sweden
- Ronneby Brøndanstalt, Sweden
- Haseldorf, Holstain

== See also ==
- Parks and open spaces in Copenhagen
