= Peter Christian Bønecke =

Danish architect

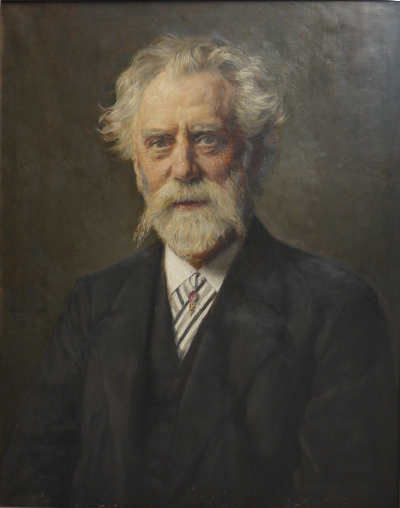
- Peter Christian Bønecke painted by Otto Bache.
- Born: 19 April 1841; Copenhagen, Denmark
- Died: 23 October 1914 (aged 73); Hellerup, Copenhagen
- Occupation: Architect
- Awards: C. F. Hansen Medal (1875)

Peter Christian Bønecke (19 April 1841 -– 23 October 1914) was a Danish architect.

== Early life and education ==
Bønecke was born in Copenhagen where he trained as a mason under his father while in the same time training as an architect at N. H. and Niels Sigfred Nebelong studio. He then went abroad where he first spend several years at the building school Holzminden before working for four years as a draughtsman for Theophil Hansen in Vienna. He then continued his travels for another two years, mainly in Italy.

== Career ==
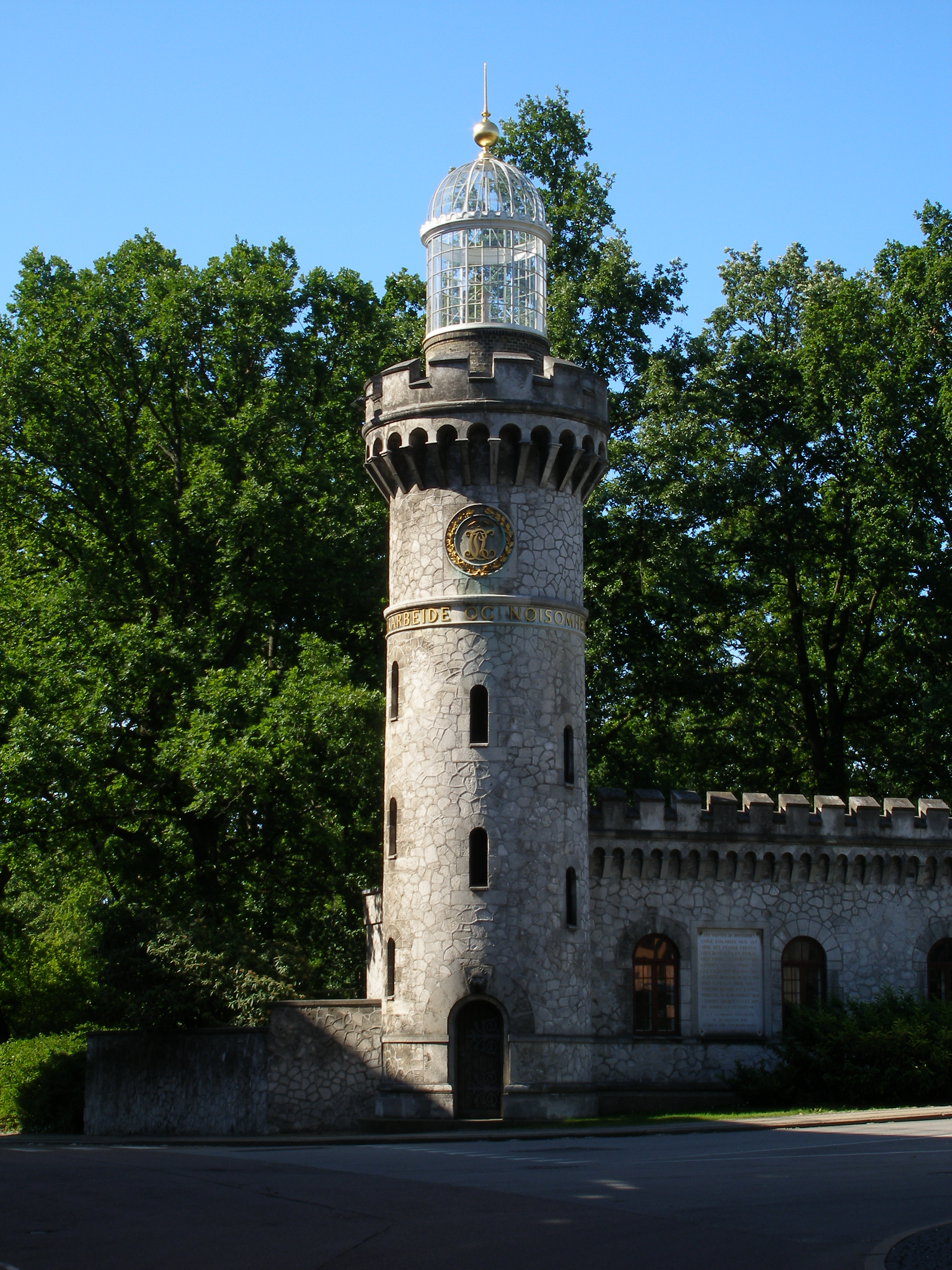
The Lime Tower

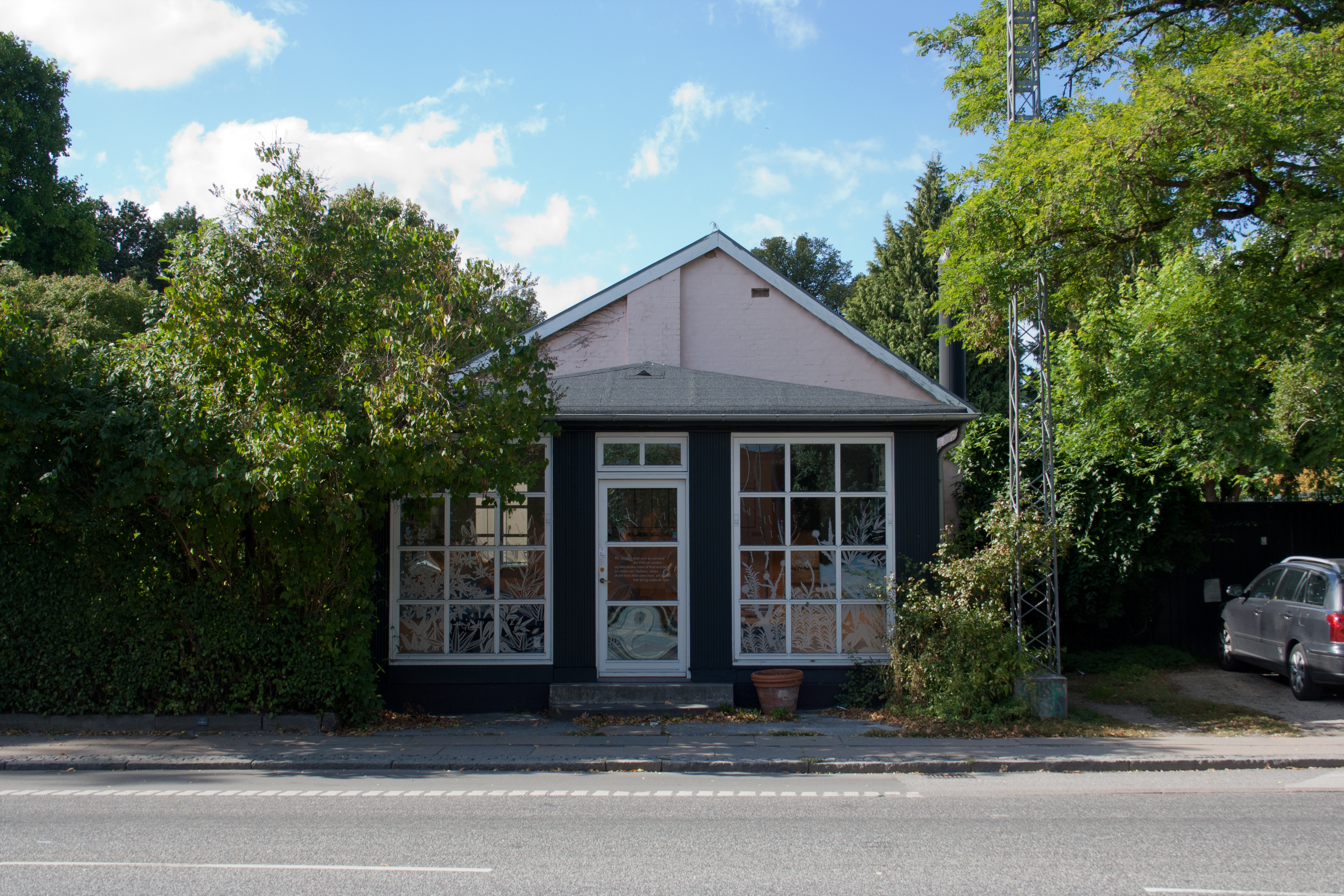
The Well House

After his return to Denmark in 1865, Bønecke settled as a master mason in Copenhagen but soon received a considerable amount of architectural assignments. In 1871, in collaboration with V. Friederichsen, he won third prize in the competition for the new Royal Danish Theatre at Kongens Nytorv.

In 1863, he was appointed to Building Inspector in Copenhagen and from 1888 to 1913 he served as Stadsbygmester ("City Builder"). In 1979 he drafted a proposal for a new building act which later formed the basis for the Copenhagen Building Act of 1889.

He continued his private practice besides his public offices. He worked for Carlsberg founder J. C. Jacobsen on several projects. Their first collaboration was on an orangery (known as Pompeii) completed in 1876 for Jacobsen's home, now known as Carlsberg Academy. He also designed Carlsberg Lighthouse and the new main entrance (Stjerneporten, "Star Gate") to Old Carlsberg. It has previously been believed that he also designed the Palm House at Copenhagen Botanical Garden in collaboration with J. C. Jacobsen who sponsored its construction but it has now been established that it was most likely designed by Christian Hansen. In 1885, he designed the small Well House in the Royal Danish Horticultural Society's Garden.

== Private life ==
Bønecke married Augusta Vilhelmine Lorentze née Biørn on 3 June 1866. He held one of the highest offices at the Free Masons' Lodge in Copenhagen. He is buried at Assistens Cemetery.

== List of works ==
- 15 Fredericiagade, Copenhagen (1867)
- 11 Vodroffsvej, Frederiksberg, Copenhagen (1868)
- 49 Nørre søgade, Copenhagen (1876)
- Pompei, Carlsberg Academy, Copenhagen (1876, with J. C. Jacobsen)
- 94 Gammel kongevej, Frederiksberg, Copenhagen
- Carlsberg Lighthouse, Carlsberg, Copenhagen (1883)
- Well House, Royal Danish Horticultural Society's Garden, Copenhagen (1885)
- villa Dorothea, 4 Brodersens vej, Hellerup (1898)
