= Fortification Ring, Copenhagen =

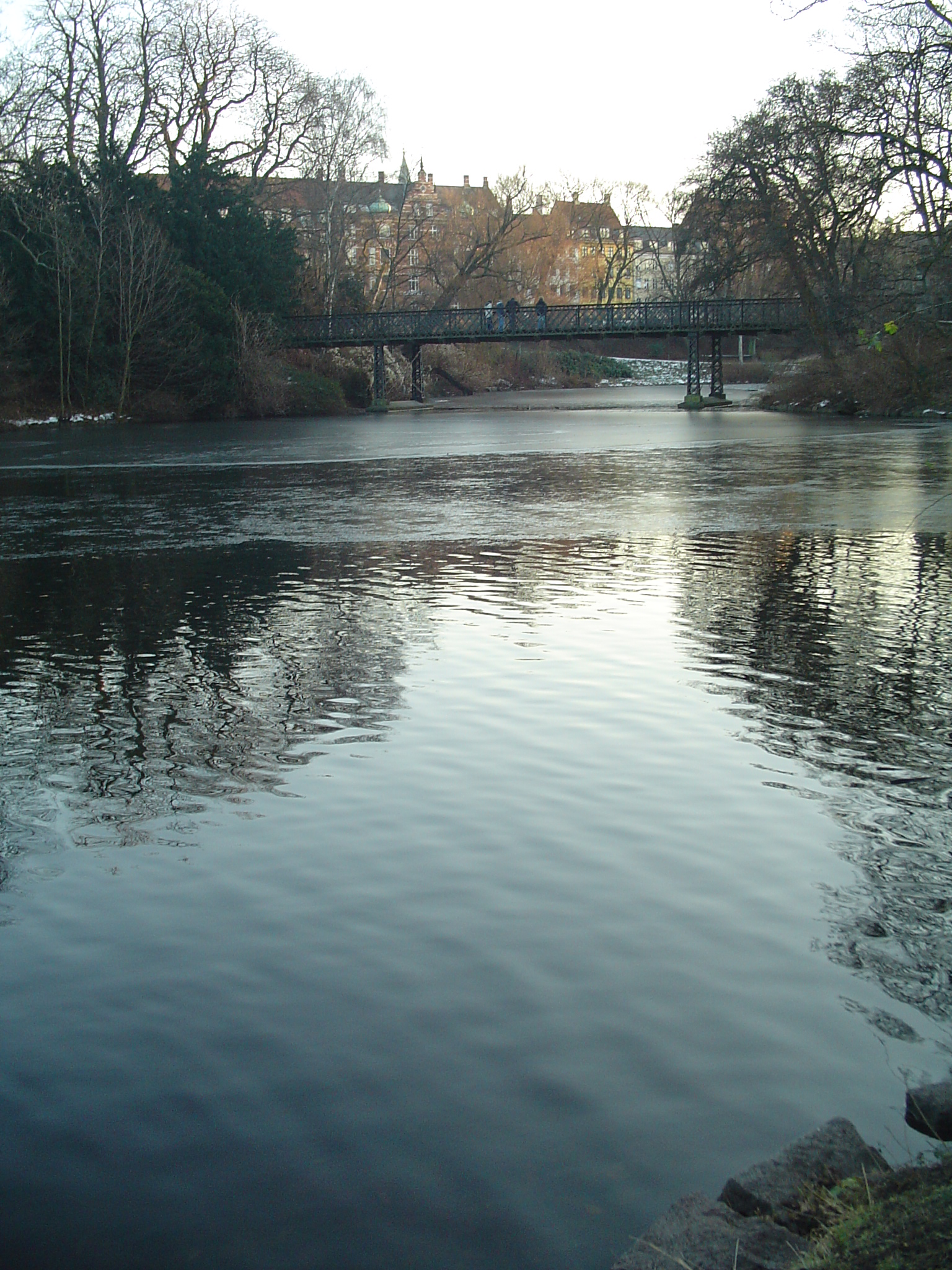
Ørstedsparken, its lake is a remnant of the moat which used to surround the city as part of the fortifications

The Fortification Ring (Danish: Fæstningsringen) in Copenhagen, Denmark, is a collective name used to refer to the grounds where the city's old 17th-century fortifications used to lie, now surrounding the City Centre. Since the fortifications were decommissioned in 1870, the Fortification Ring has been dominated by a number of parks and distinctive greenspaces and it is still maintained and developed as a green belt within the city limits, running between the city centre and the -bro districts. The ramparts, bastions and moats of the former fortifications are still clearly seen in the topography. At Christianshavn and the citadel Kastellet, the fortifications have been preserved and remain intact.

== History ==
The decommissioning of Copenhagen's fortifications was a lengthy process. Though the four city gates were finally dismantled in 1858–60 to allow for traffic to pass more freely in and out of the city, work on the ramparts continued and it would take another two decades before a denise fell into place. In 1867 a law abolished the demarcation line around the city and in the same time it provided the legislative foundation for the City of Copenhagen, on certain conditions, to take over the extensive areas which the fortifications had occupied till then. When an agreement fell into place in 1868, with effect from 1 January 1870, it stipulated that the City was required to use certain specified areas for green spaces. An area was to be put at the disposal of the University of Copenhagen Botanical Garden and a minimum of 300,000 square ell (12 hectares) were to be laid out as public parks. In addition, a master plan for the redevelopment of the area had to be approved by the State.

A master plan for the area was approved in 1872 and ground work proceeded, first at the Northern Rampart. A revision of the master plan in 1885 increased the area to be laid out as parkland to 23.5 hectares.

The decommissioning of the Christianshavn Rampart finally followed in 1916.

== The Fortification Ring today ==
=== Parks & greenspaces ===
Parks and other open or semi-open spaces located in the fortification ring, starting at Kastellet and proceeding anti-clockwise, include:

- Kastellet
- Churchill Parken
- Østre Anlæg
- Copenhagen Botanical Garden
- Ørstedsparken
- Tivoli Gardens
- Ny Carlsberg Glyptotek Garden
- Christianshavn Rampart
- Freetown Christiania

=== Notable buildings ===
Notable buildings and institutions include:

- Copenhagen Municipal Hospital (1858–63)
- Østervold Observatory (1859–61)
- Copenhagen Central Fire Station (1889–92)
- National Gallery (1896)
- Copenhagen City Hall (1905)
- The Hirschsprung Collection (1911)
- Ny Carlsberg Glyptotek
