= Louis Hasselriis =

Danish sculptor (1844–1912)

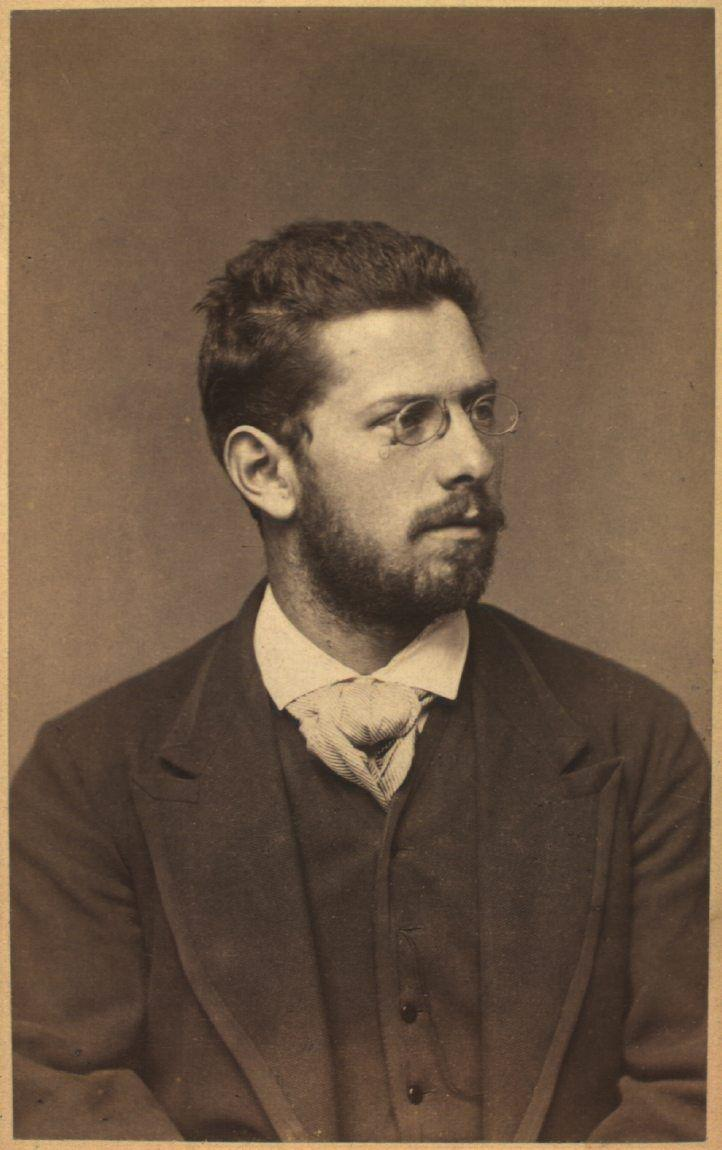
- Louis Hasselriis photographed by Ludvig Grundvig
- Born: 12 January 1844; Hillerød, Denmark
- Died: 20 May 1912 (aged 68); Frederiksberg, Denmark
- Education: Royal Danish Academy of Fine Arts
- Known for: Sculptor
- Movement: Naturalism

Louis Hasselriis (12 January 1844 – 20 May 1912) was a Danish sculptor known for his public statuary.

== Career ==
Hasselriis had his debut at the Charlottenborg Exhibition in 1863. From 1869 and for the rest of his life he lived in Rome, but retained strong links with his homeland and also with the USA. In Denmark he created a statue of William Shakespeare for Helsingør and memorials to national heroes such as Peder Griffenfeld (Copenhagen) and Hans Christian Andersen (Odense)). A copy of his Hans Christian Andersen statue exists in New Jersey.

His memorial to Heinrich Heine marks the poet's grave in Montmartre cemetery in Paris. A full size statue of the German-Jewish poet was also created for Empress Elizabeth of Austria. After her death it was removed from its original location by the antisemitic Kaiser Wilhelm II, and was rejected when offered to the city of Hamburg. With the rise of the Nazis, it was moved out of Germany to be erected in the Jardin d'acclimatation du Mourillon, Toulon. Though it survived the war, other Hasselriis statues were melted down to make munitions.

== Gallery ==
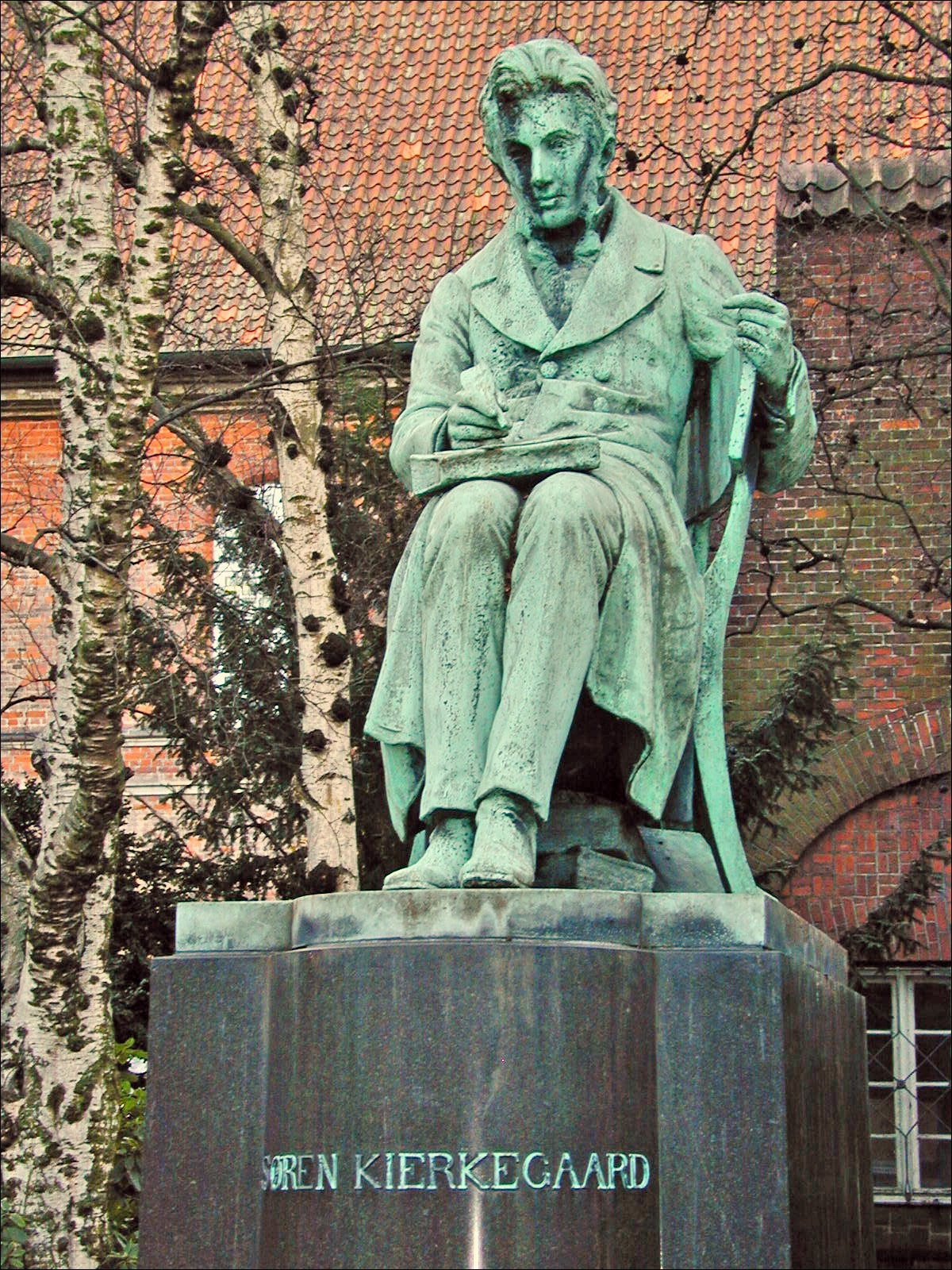
Søren Kierkegaard statue, Royal Library Garden Copenhagen (1879, installed)

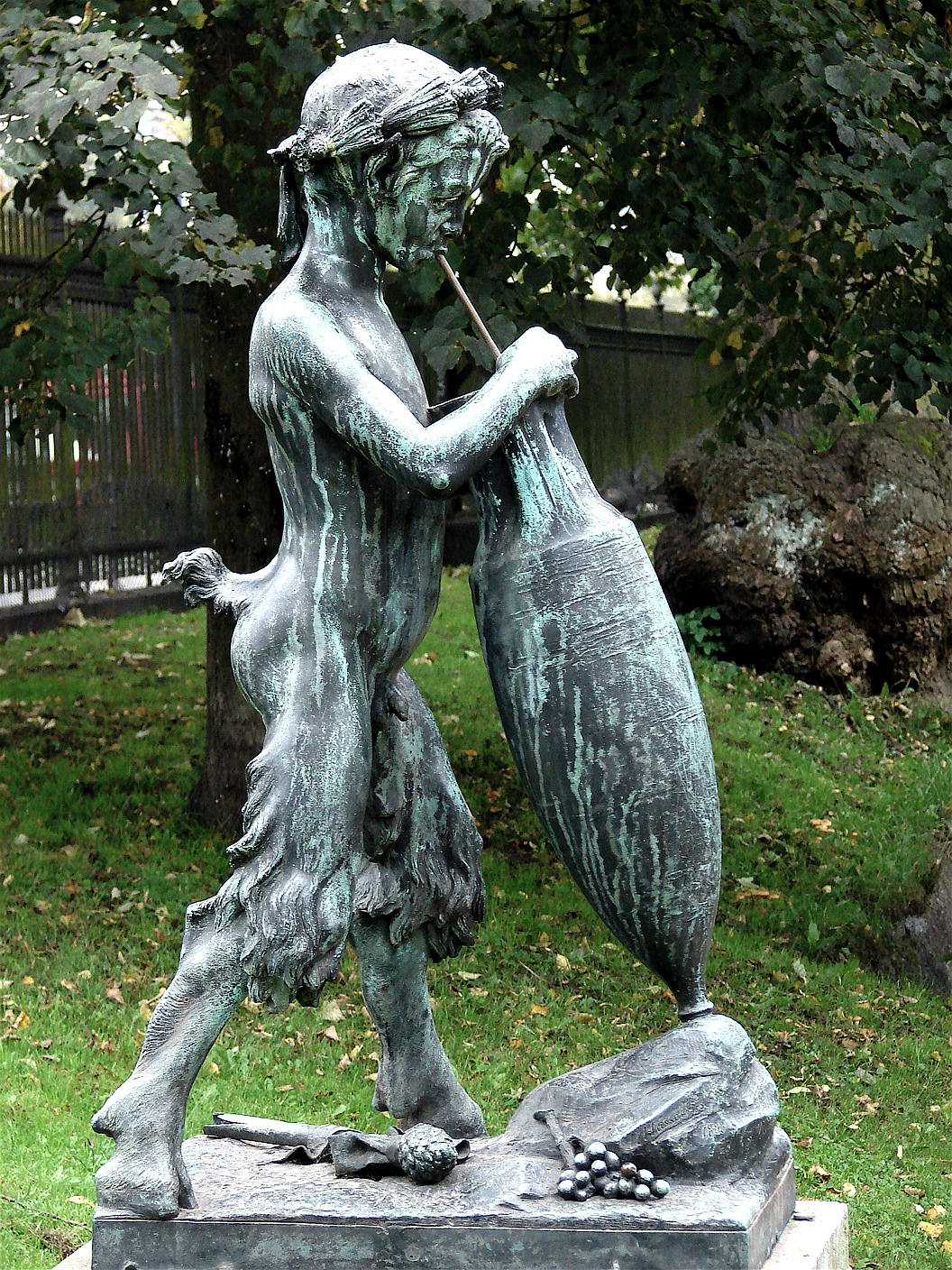
Wine-sucking Satyr, Ørsted Park, Copenhagen (1888)

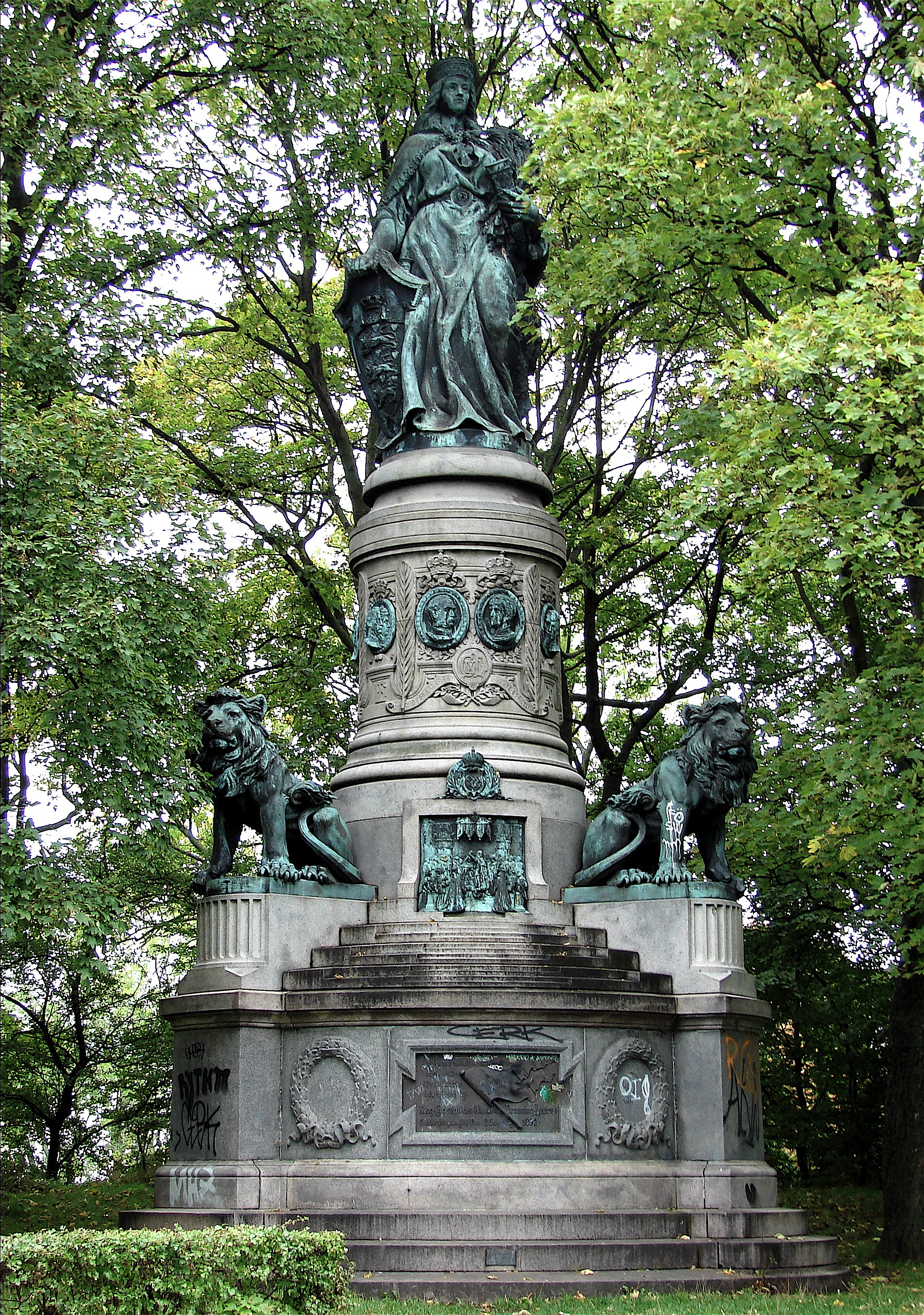
Denmark Monument, Østre Anlæg, Copenhagen (1897)

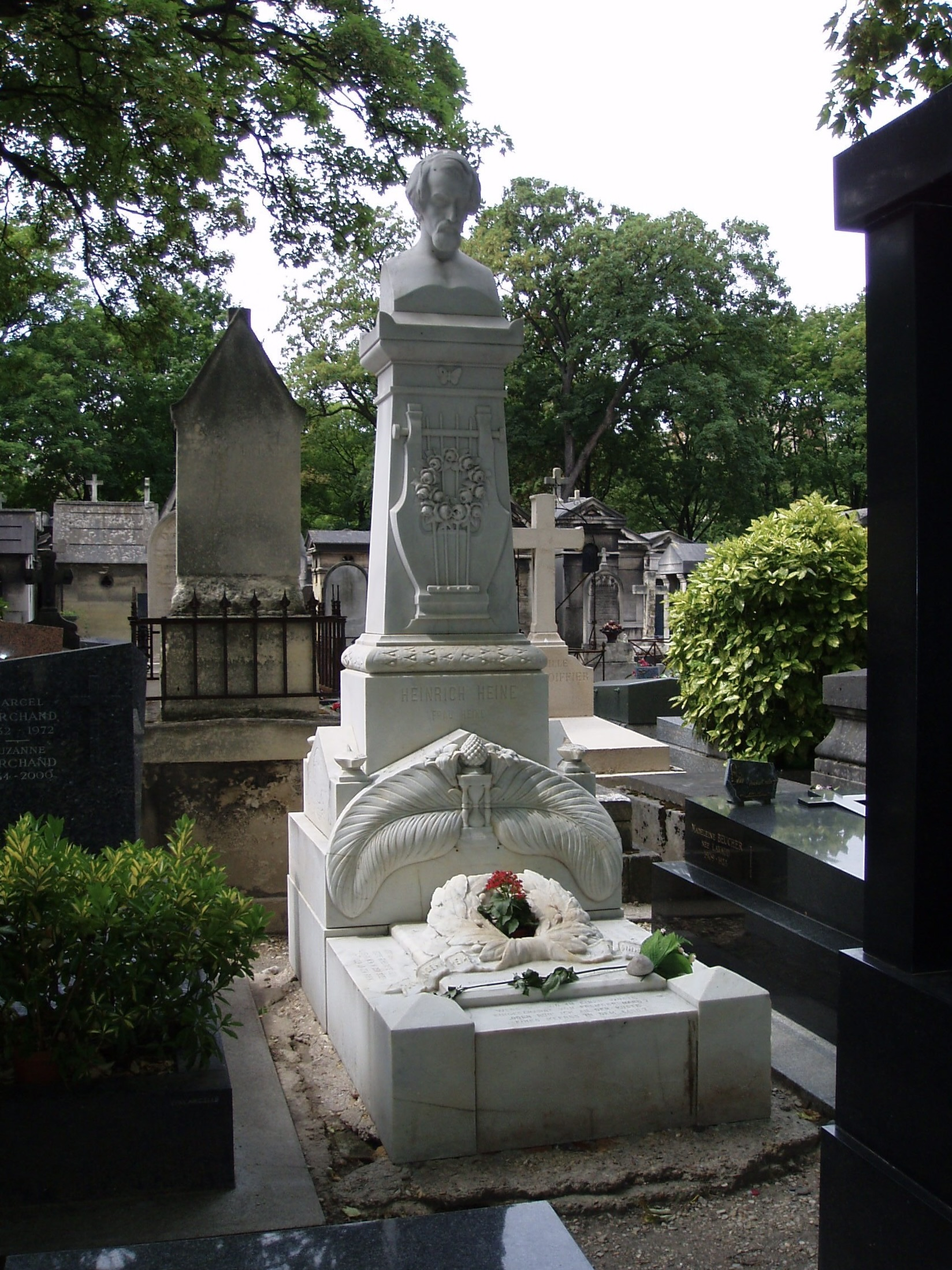
Tomb of Heinrich Heine designed by Hasselriis

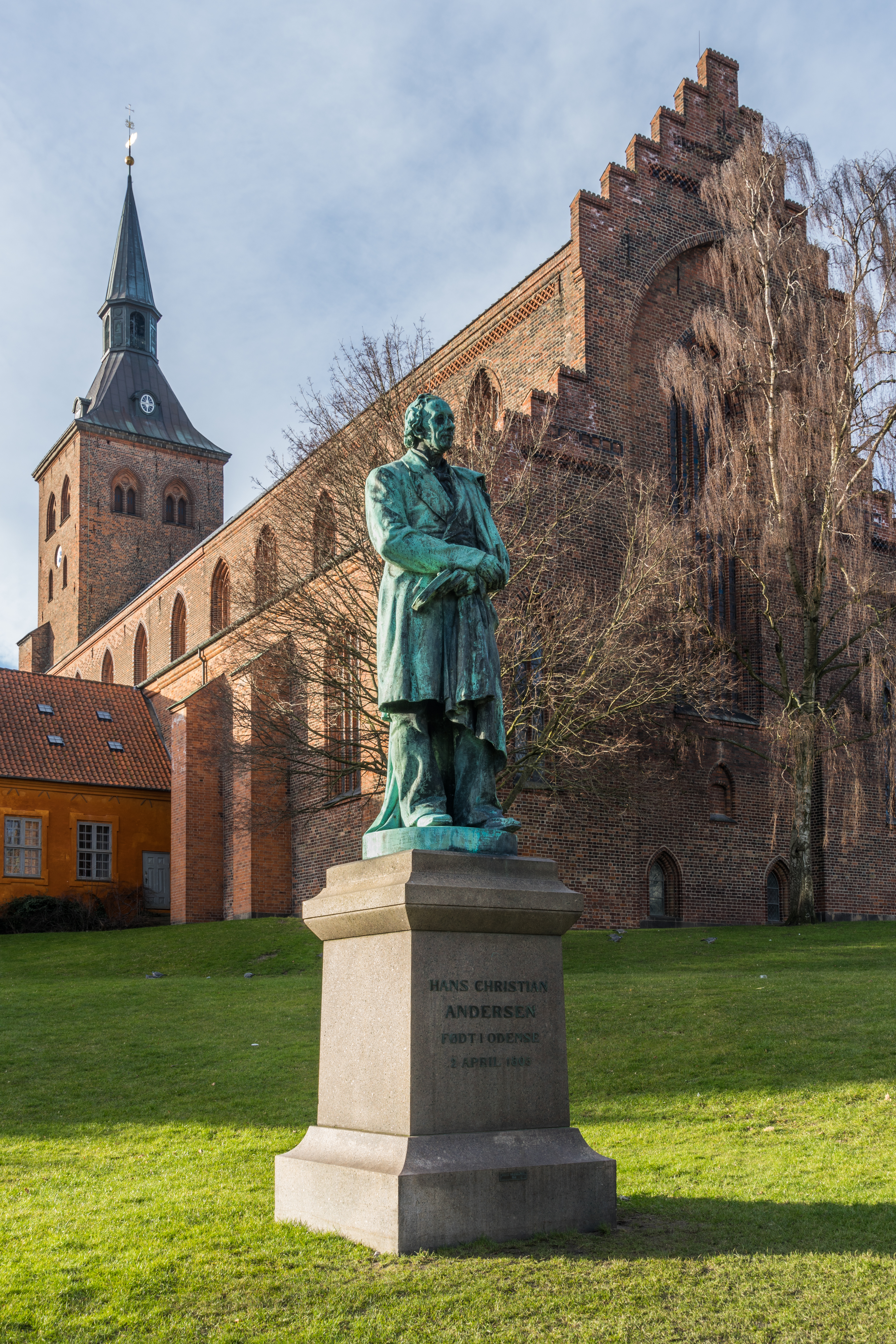
Hans Christian Andersen, statue by Hasselriis in Odense (Andersen's birthplace), Denmark (1888)
