= Carlsberg Lighthouse =

Lighthouse in Denmark

Coordinates: 55.6661°N 12.5328°E

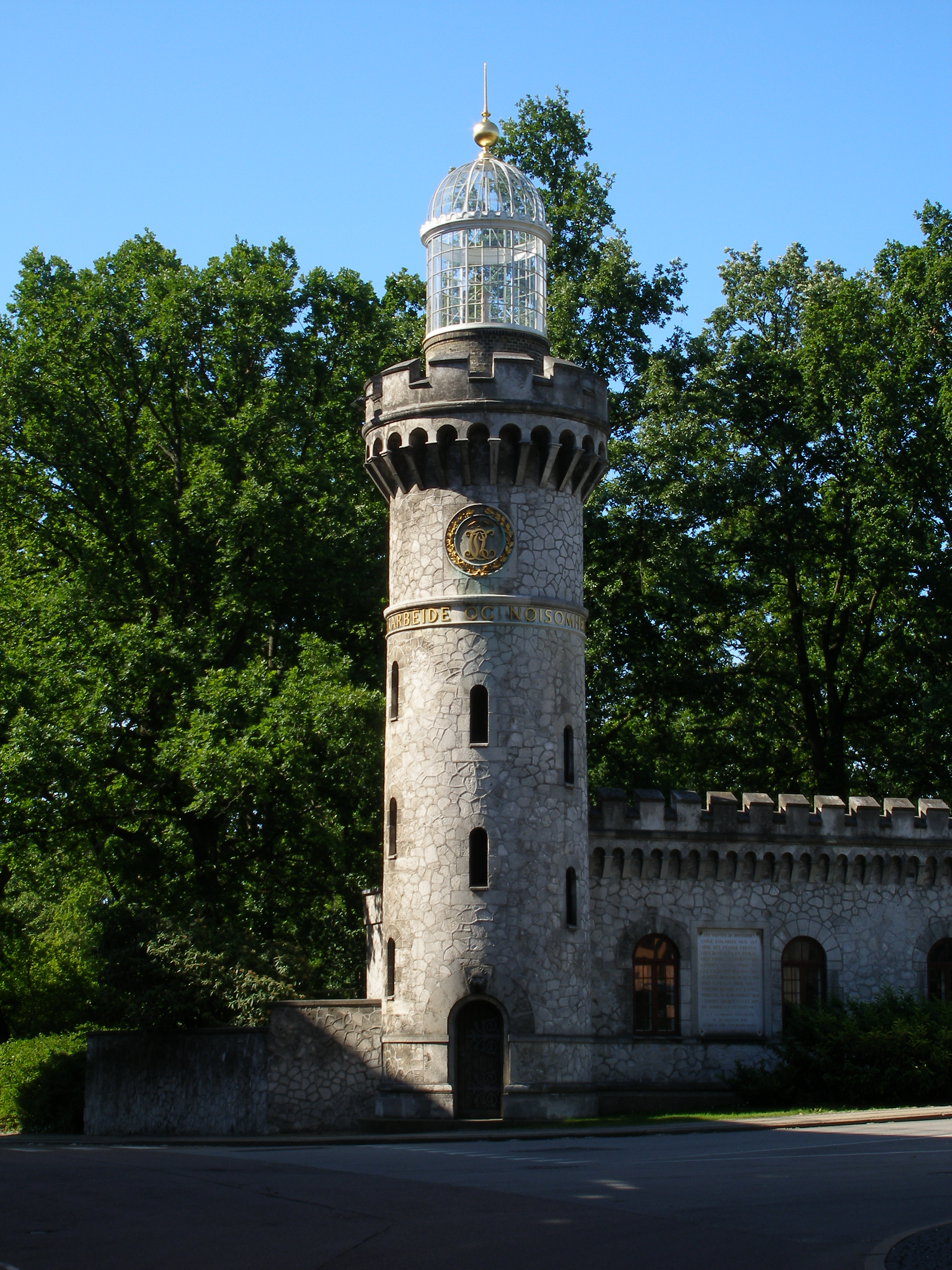
The Lime Tower

Carlsberg Lighthouse (Danish: Carlsberg Fyrtårn), also known as the Lime Tower (Danish: Kridttårnet) after the limestone which is its dominating building material, is a former lighthouse located in the Carlsberg area of Copenhagen, Denmark.

== History ==
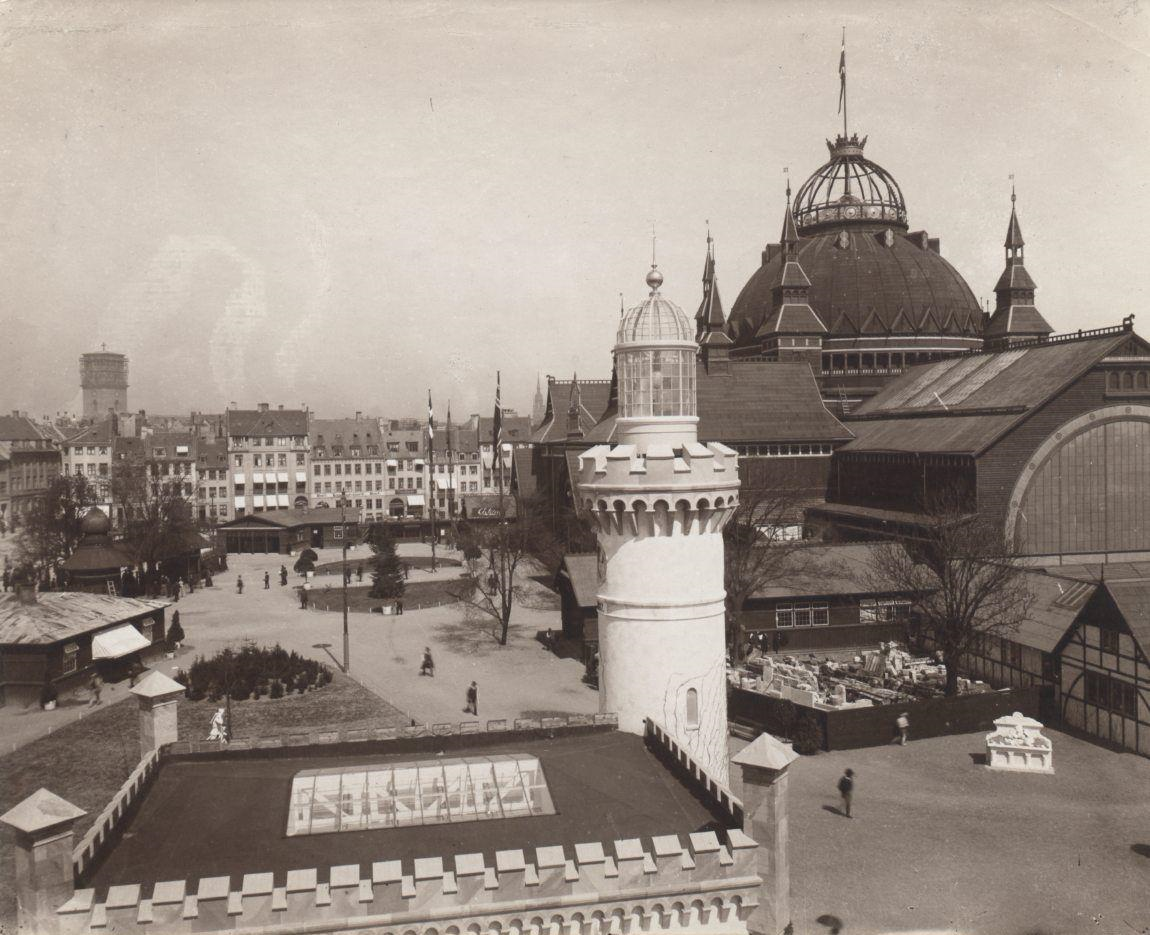
The lighthouse at the Great Exhibition in 1888

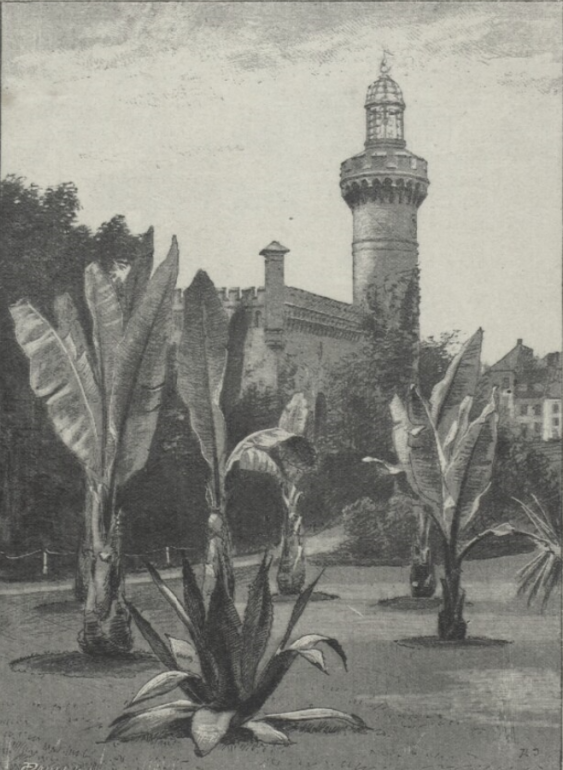
The lighthouse at the Great Exhibition in 1888

Built in 1883, the Lime Tower was originally part of a new main entrance for J.C. Jacobsen's Carlsberg Brewery site in Valby. The brewery had assumed the name Gammel Carlsberg (en: Old Carlsberg) after his son, Carl Jacobsen, due to a controversy between them, had established a new brewery which, with his father's consent, traded under the name Ny Carlsberg (en: New Carlsberg). The new main entrance was an arch, which incorporated the new name in gilded letters. The gate was connected to the Lime Tower by a wall which was also built in limestone.

Electric lighting had been introduced in the brewery in 1882, at a time when it was still not widely available in Copenhagen. Since the site was also located on high ground, atop Valby Hill, it was decided to combine the guardhouse with a lighthouse.

== Architecture ==
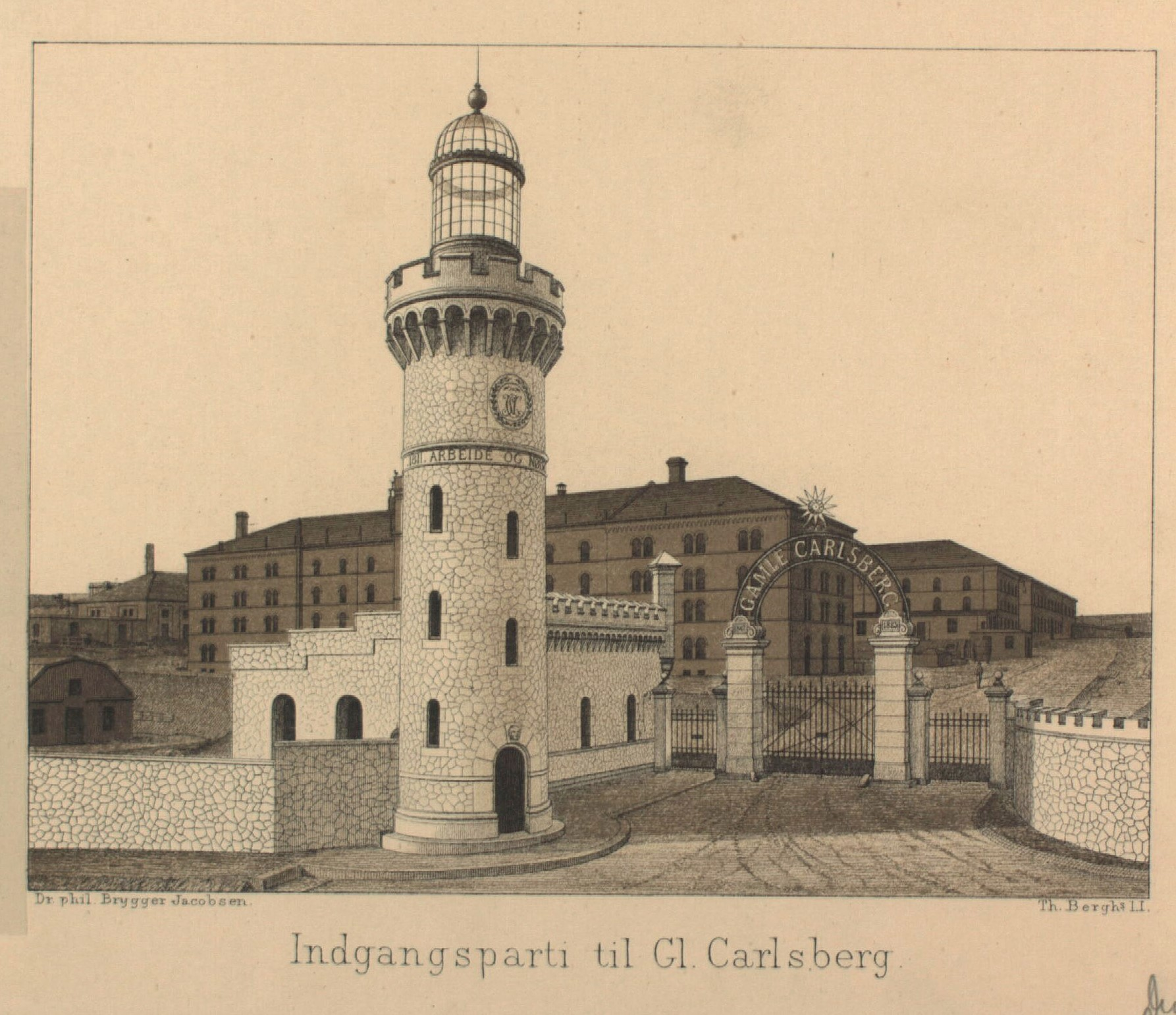
Carlsberg Lighthouse

The lighthouse is built to a Historicist design, drawing on medieval castle towers for inspiration. It is built in limestone from Stevns and stands on a granite plinth.

The gate consists of two granite pillars which are connected by a cast iron arch featuring Gammel Carlsberg's name in gilded letters. The arch is topped by a 12-pointed star, a symbol which J. C. Jacobsen used as a trademark and had recently registered as such in the newly established trademark register. A series of dates, representing key events in the history of the brewery are inscribed on the pillars: 1847 for the first brew, 1867 for the year the brewery burned, 1870 for the building of the so-called Annex Brewery, and 1883 for the building of the Gate.

== Carlsberg Lighthouse today ==
The light and guardhouse was rented out in 2009 and was used as a combined residence and studio by an artist. On 10 December 2021 the Swiss art gallery von Bartha opened a new gallery space located in the Carlsberg Lighthouse, continuing the gallery's tradition of using distinctive architectural space.

== See also ==
- List of lighthouses in Denmark
