= Ørstedsparken =

Park in Copenhagen, Denmark

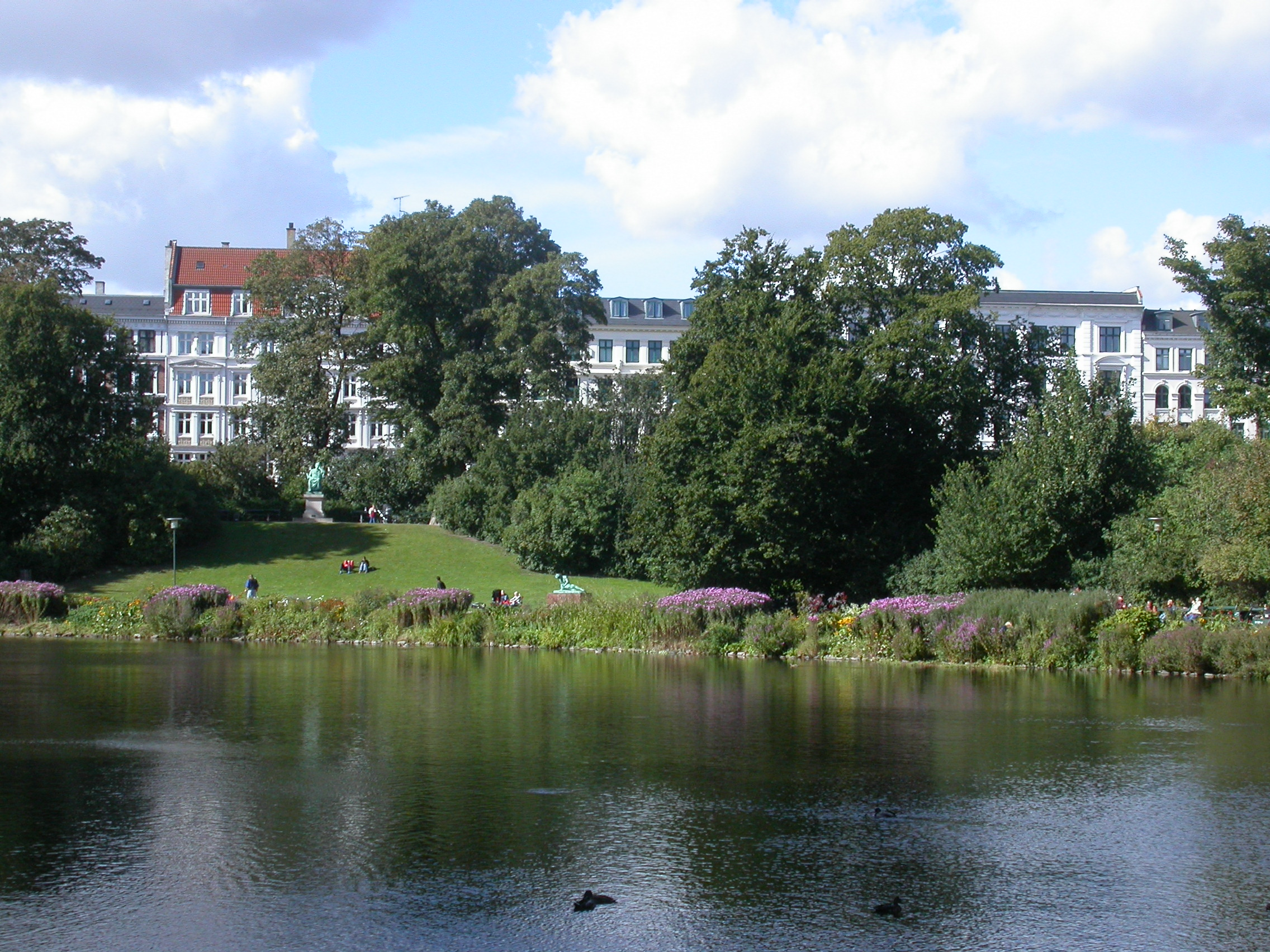
- Interactive map of Ørstedsparken
- Type: Public
- Location: Copenhagen, Denmark
- Coordinates: 55°40′51″N 12°33′59″E
- Area: 6.5 hectares
- Created: 27 October 1879
- Designer: Henrik August Flindt
- Owner: Copenhagen Municipality

Ørstedsparken is a public park in central Copenhagen, Denmark. One in a series of parks which were laid out on the grounds of the old fortification ring after it was decommissioned in the 1870s, the park still retains elements from the old fortifications in its topography—a section of the moat now serve as an elongated lake and former bastions appear in the landscape as small hills. The park is named for the brothers Ørsted, the politician and jurist Anders Sandøe Ørsted, and the physicist Hans Christian Ørsted, who both are commemorated with monuments in the park.

== History ==
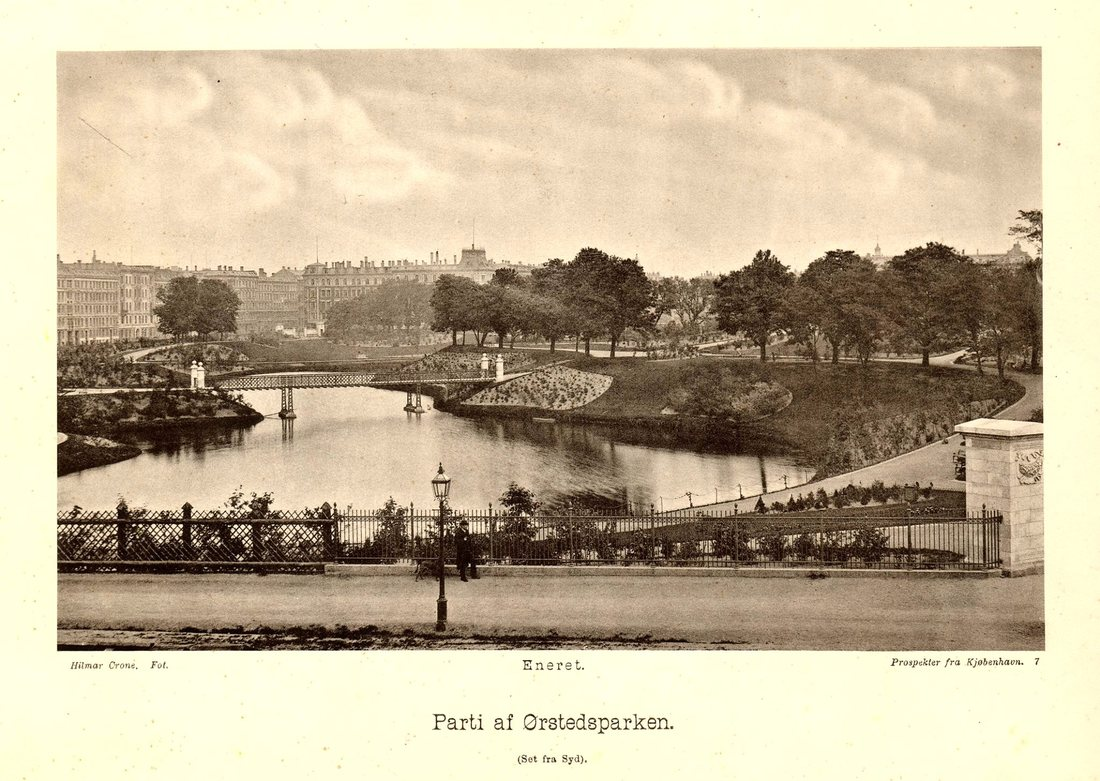
Ørsted Park photographed by Hilmar Crone in 1880

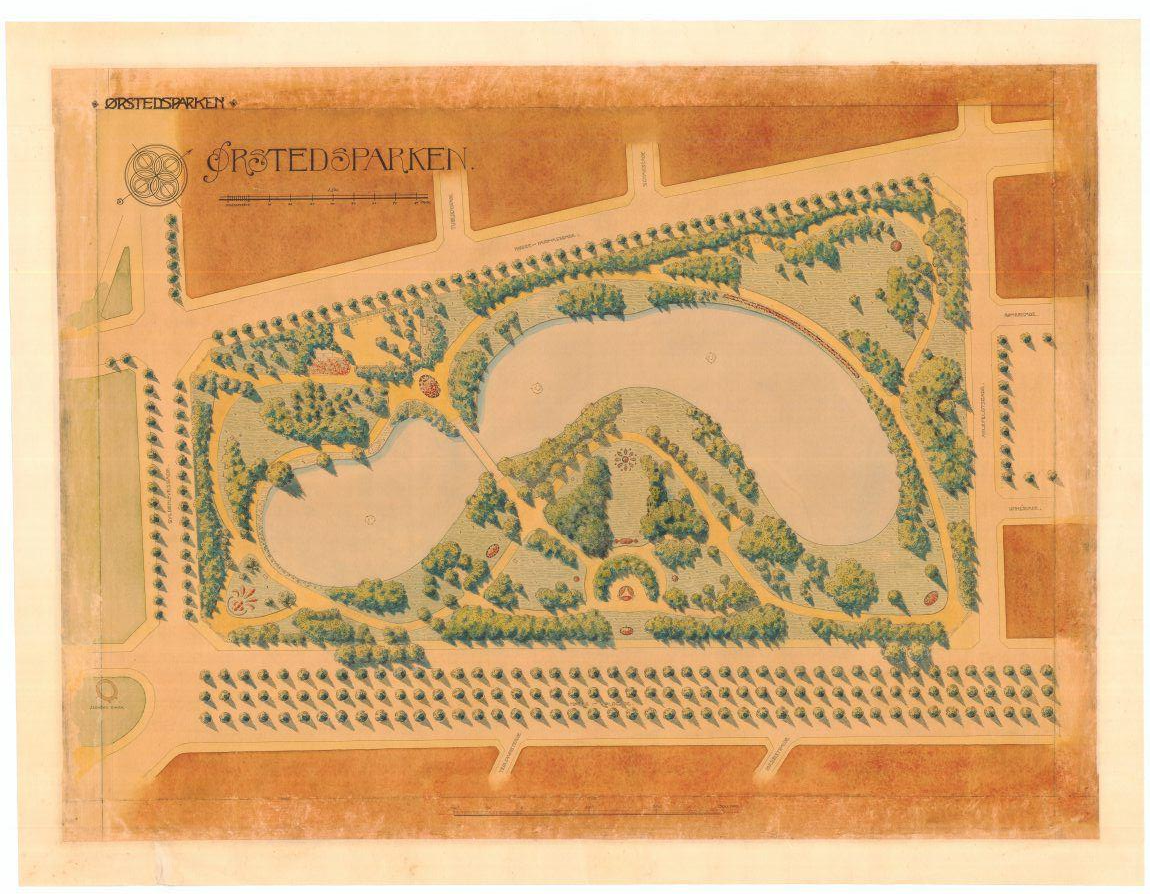
Plan of the park from 1914

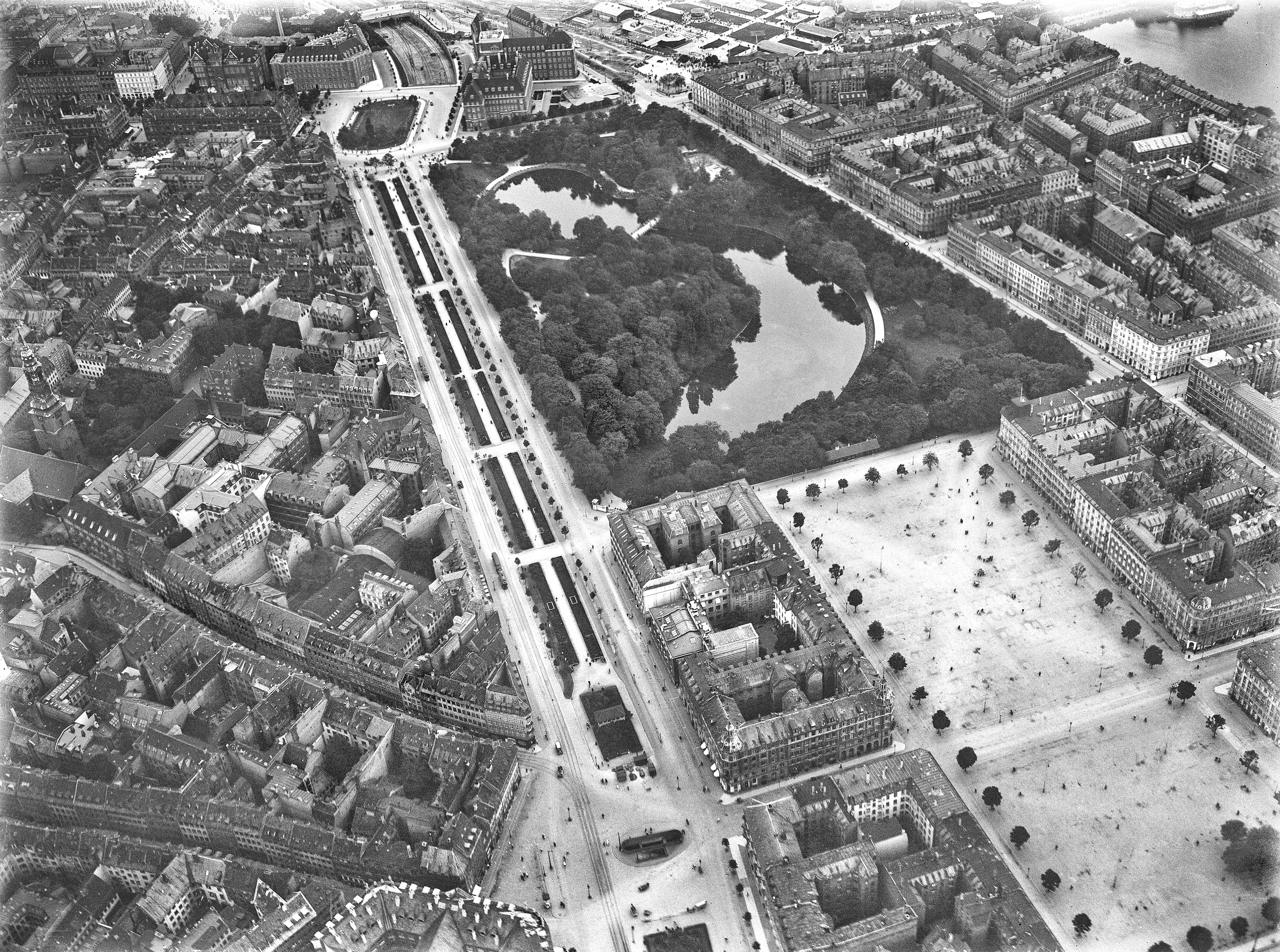
Aerial of the park from between 1894 and 1934

When Copenhagen's old fortification ring was decommissioned in 1868 and its grounds were relinquished to the city, it was decided that a significant part of it should be reserved for parkland for the city's rapidly growing population. The City Council adopted a plan for the redevelopment of the area in 1872 which resulted in three new parks—Ørstedsparken, the no longer existing Aborreparken and Østre Anlæg—as well as the relocation of University of Copenhagen Botanical Garden a few years later.

Ørstedsparken includes the area from Ahlefeldt's Bastion until Bastion to Helmer's Bastion of the old Western Rampart. Gardener and landscape architect Henrik August Flindt was charged with the design and construction began in 1876. The new park was inaugurated on 27 October 1879. It was a promenade park and also included Copenhagen's first public playground. The grounds were listed in 1963.

== Layout ==
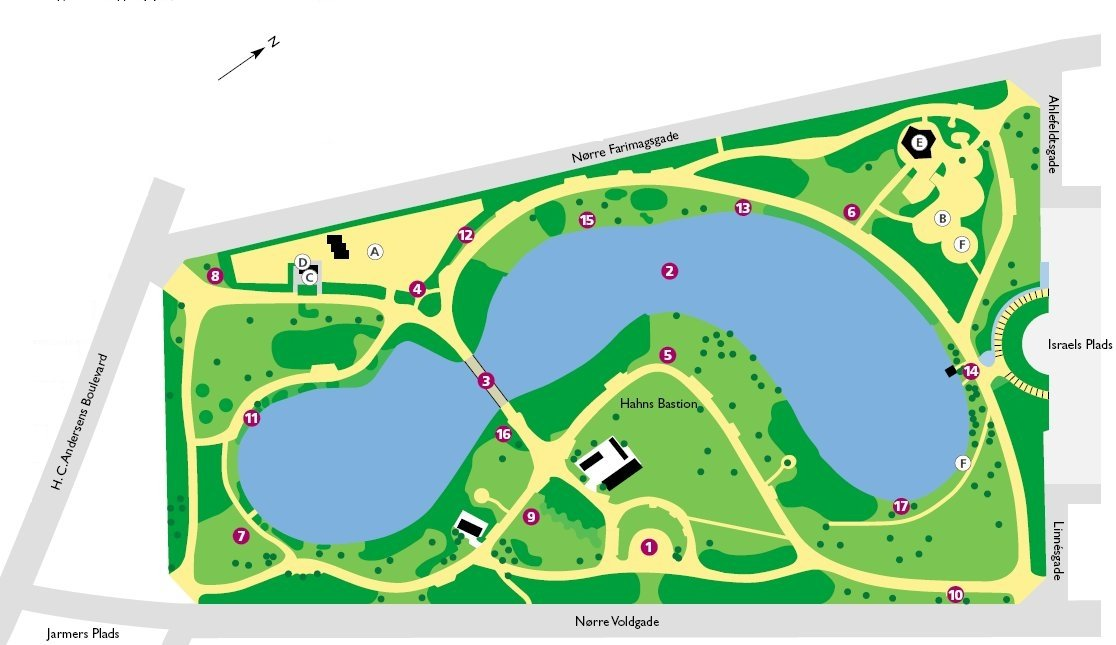
A map of Ørstedsparken

Ørstedsparken covers 6.5 ha and is bounded by Nørre Voldgade, Nørre Farimagsgade, H. C. Andersens Boulevard and Frederiksborg Gade, with seven entrances distributed on all sides. It retains much of its original character.

The old fortifications have partly been preserved in the landscaping of the park. A section of the old moat now forms an elongated lake which runs along the length of the park. It has an area of 1,8 ha and a depth of about 4 metres. In 1994, an underground connection to Peblinge Sø was created to improve the water quality. The water circulates between the two lakes, especially during the winter. The wrought iron bridge which today crosses the lake, originally spanned the gap created with the demolition of the Northern City Gate in 1857. In 1873, the bridge was dismantled and re-built at its current location.

== Monuments and statues ==
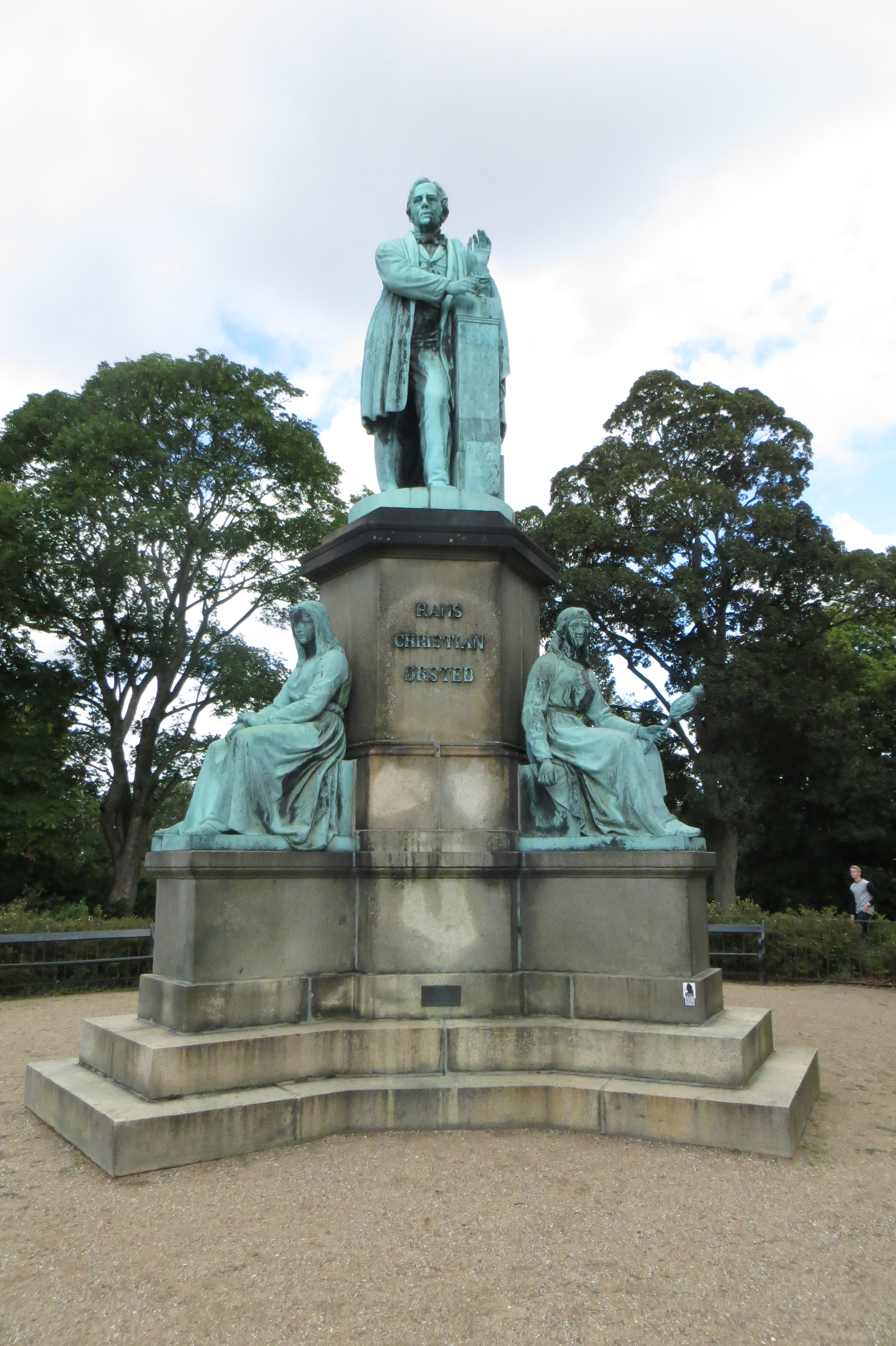
Monument for H.C. Ørsted.

=== H. C. Ørsted Monument ===
The monument over Hans Christian Ørsted stands on the former Holck's Bastion. It was designed by Jens Adolf Jerichau and erected in 1876, when work on the park just started. The monument consists of a bronze statue of Ørsted mounted on a granite plinth. Ørsted is seen demonstrating the effect of an electric current on a magnetic needle. With his hands he is connecting the wires from an electric battery, thereby making a magnet oscillate. At the foot of the statue sit the three Norns or goddesses of destiny in Norse mythology, Urðr (the past) who is noting the past, and Ørsted's name, on a tablet, Verðandi (the present), who with her distaff is spinning the thread of fate, and Skuld (the future), who is silently awaiting the fullness of time with a rune stick in her hand.

=== Other memorials ===
Besides the monument for H.C. Ørsted, the park also contains monuments for

- Anders Sandøe Ørsted (1778–1860) who was a lawyer and politician, brother of Hans Christian Ørsted. The monument was created by Vilhelm Bissen after a model by Herman Wilhelm Bissen and erected in 1902
- Niels Lauritz Hvidt (1777–1856), who was a politician, shipowner and chairman of the National Bank as well as a member of the Danish constitutional assembly. The monument was created by Vilhelm Bissen after a model by Herman Wilhelm Bissen and erected in 1877.
- Natalie Zahle (1828–1913), a leading female figure and founder of Zahles School nearby. Monument designed by Ludvig Brandstrup
- Bertel Thorvaldsen, monument designed by Einar Utzon-Frank and erected in 1954.

=== Classical replicas ===
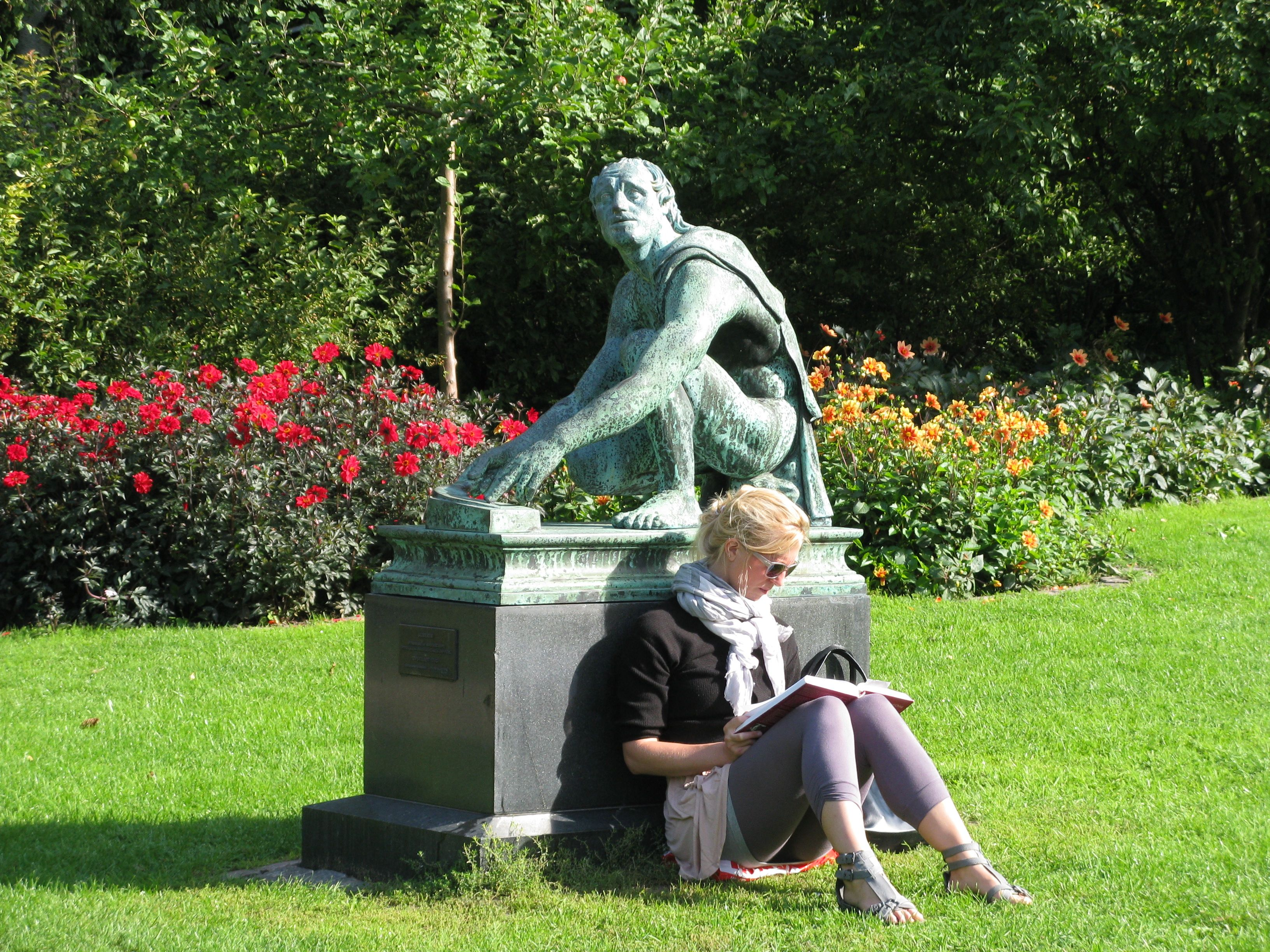
Arrotino statue

Spread over the park are also a large number of statues, granted by the Albertina Foundation which was created by the head of Carlsberg, Carl Jacobsen. Among these are:

- The Dying Gaul – designed by unknown artist
- Silenus with the Infant Bacchus – designed ny Lysippos
- Satyr with Cymbals – cast after a Roman copy of a Greek original from c. 300 BC (Uffizi Gallery), erected in 1886
- The Grinder – cast after a Roman copy of a Greek original from c. 200 BC (Uffizi Gallery), erected in 1886
- Apollo Belvedere – designed by Leochares, the model after which the bronze was cast was either a Roman marble replica of the original by Leochares from the latte 4th century BC or an original Roman work from the 1st or 2nd century AD. Musei Vaticani, Cortile del Belvedere, Rome
- Resting Hermes
- The Lizard Slayer – designed by Praxiteles, cast after Roman marble copy in the Louvre Museum of a no longer existing Greek original from c. 350 AC and erected in 1887
- Resting satyr – designed by Praxiteles, Cast after a Roman copy of a Greek original from c. 350 BC.
- Joan of Arc at Domrémy – designed by Henri Chapu
- Young Satyr playing Flute – cast after Roman copy of Greek original from c. 300 BC (Uffizi Gallery), erected in 1887.
- The Wrestlers – cast after a Roman copy of a Greek original from c. 300 BC (Uffizi Gallery), erected in 1887
- Young Satyr drinking Wine – designed by Louis Hasselriis

== Flora ==
The park has a number of unusual varieties of trees. These include Dawn Redwood, Maidenhair Tree and Pagoda Tree from China, Gleditsia from the US, European hornbeam and Horse Chestnuts. In March–April, Common Butterbur is blooming on the embankments of the lake, and in the large garden behind the H. C. Ørsted monument, 26,000 Dutch crocuses bloom in shades of blue, yellow and white. These were planted after World War II.

== Facilities and use ==
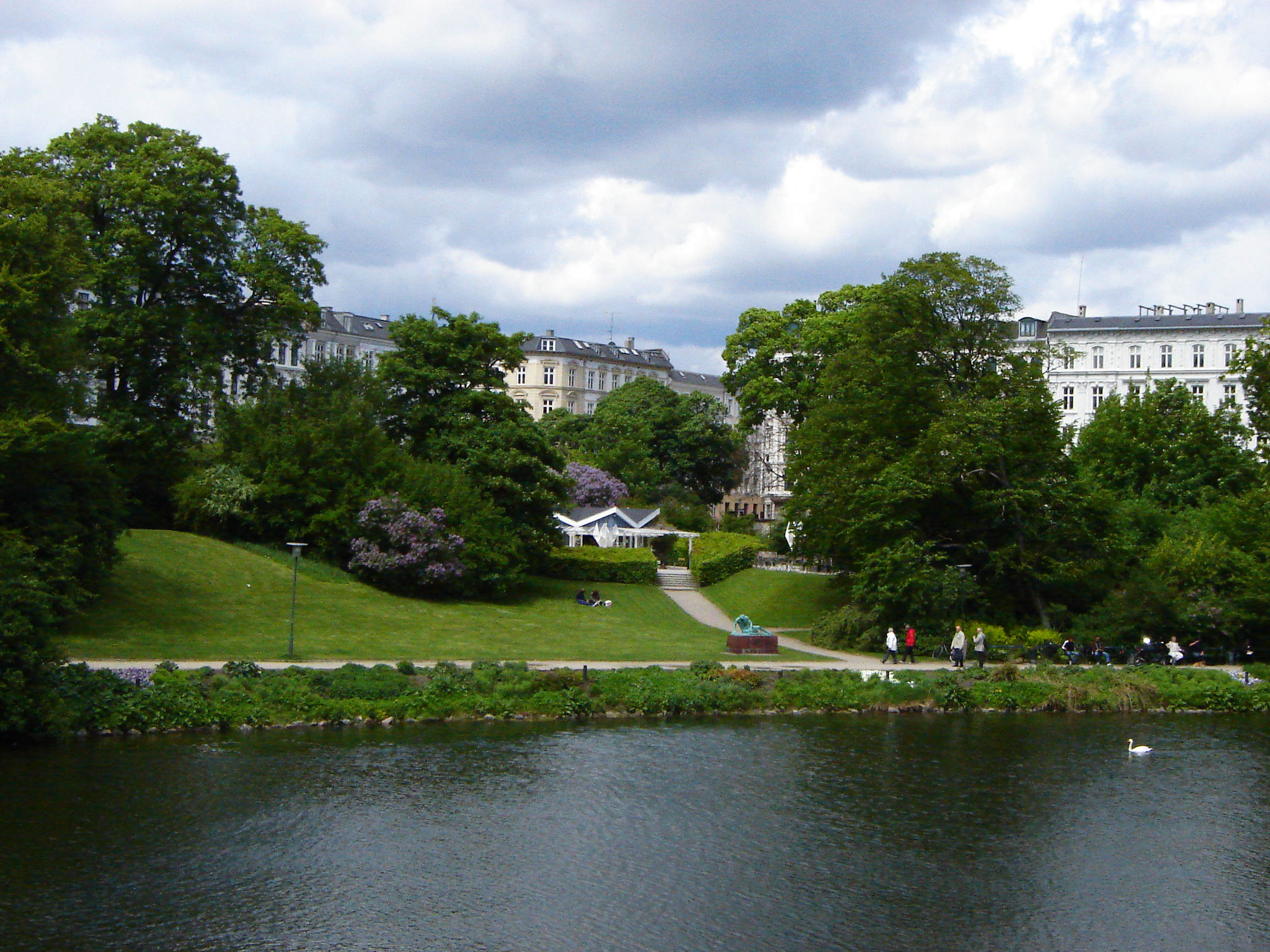
The café

In 1991, a café pavilion was built on a site overlooking the lake. It houses Café Hacienda, which serve as a venue for public debates on Sundays.

There are also two public playgrounds in the park, one supervised, and barbecues for public use. There are often open events on the lawns, with e.g. concerts in the summer.

== See also ==
- Parks and open spaces in Copenhagen
