= Østre Anlæg =

Park in Copenhagen, Denmark

Coordinates: 55°41′27″N 12°34′55″E

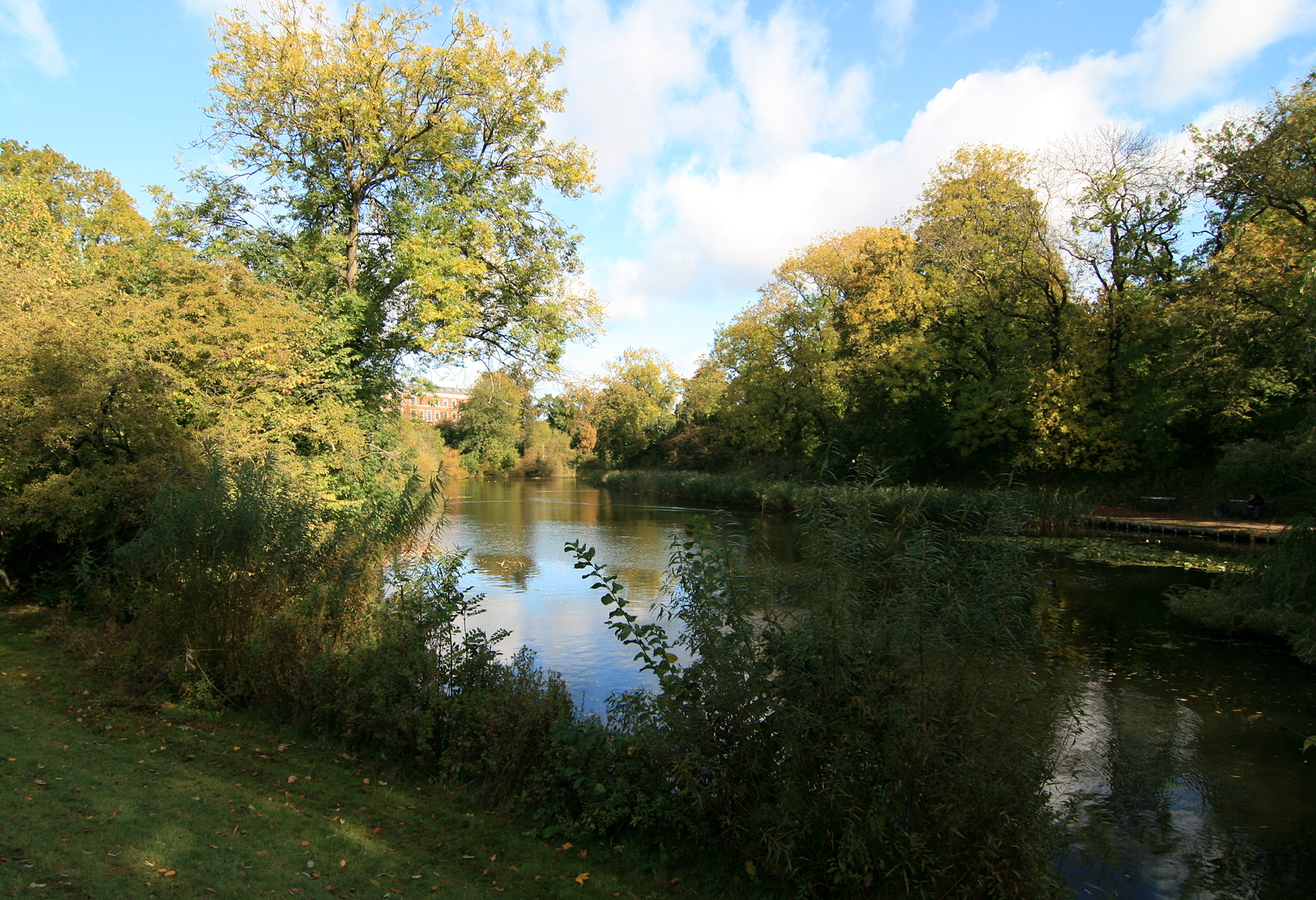
- The lake
- Interactive map of Østre Anlæg
- Type: public park
- Location: Copenhagen, Denmark
- Area: 12 hectares (30 acres)
- Created: 1870
- Operator: Copenhagen Municipality
- Status: Open all year

Østre Anlæg is a public park in Copenhagen. Once it was a part of the old city fortifications. The park was designed by landscape architect H.A. Flindt who also designed Ørstedsparken and Copenhagen Botanical Garden on the old fortification. The park lies between The National Art Museum at the southern end, and Oslo Plads and Østerport Station at the northern end. There are three lakes in this park, they used to be part of the moat system.

== History ==
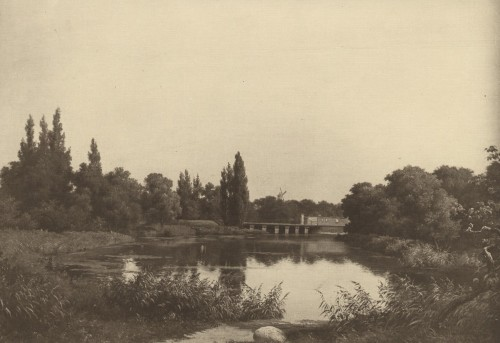
The city moat where Østre Anlæg is today uin the late 18th century

Østre Anlæg is located on land where Copenhagen's former ring fortification ran until the second half of the 19th century. At the initiative of Ferdinand Meldahl, it was decided to reserve much of the land for new public parkland. Østre Anlæg was created when the landscape architect Ole Høeg Hansen converted a section of the old Rast Rampart into an English-style landscape park in the 1870s. His original concept was prepared in 1872, but execution was delayed and the park's northern boundary remained ill-defined.

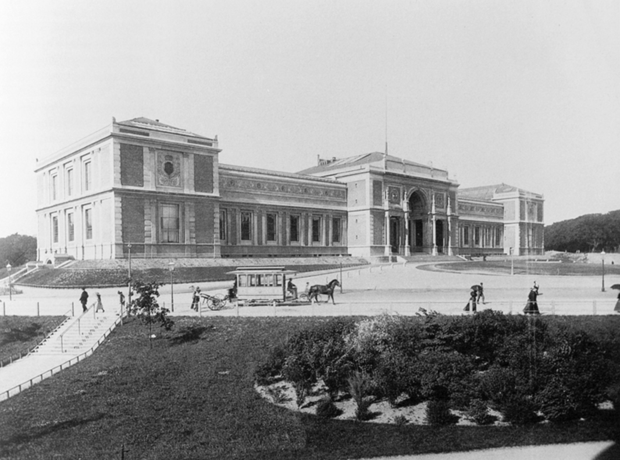
National Gallery, c. 1896

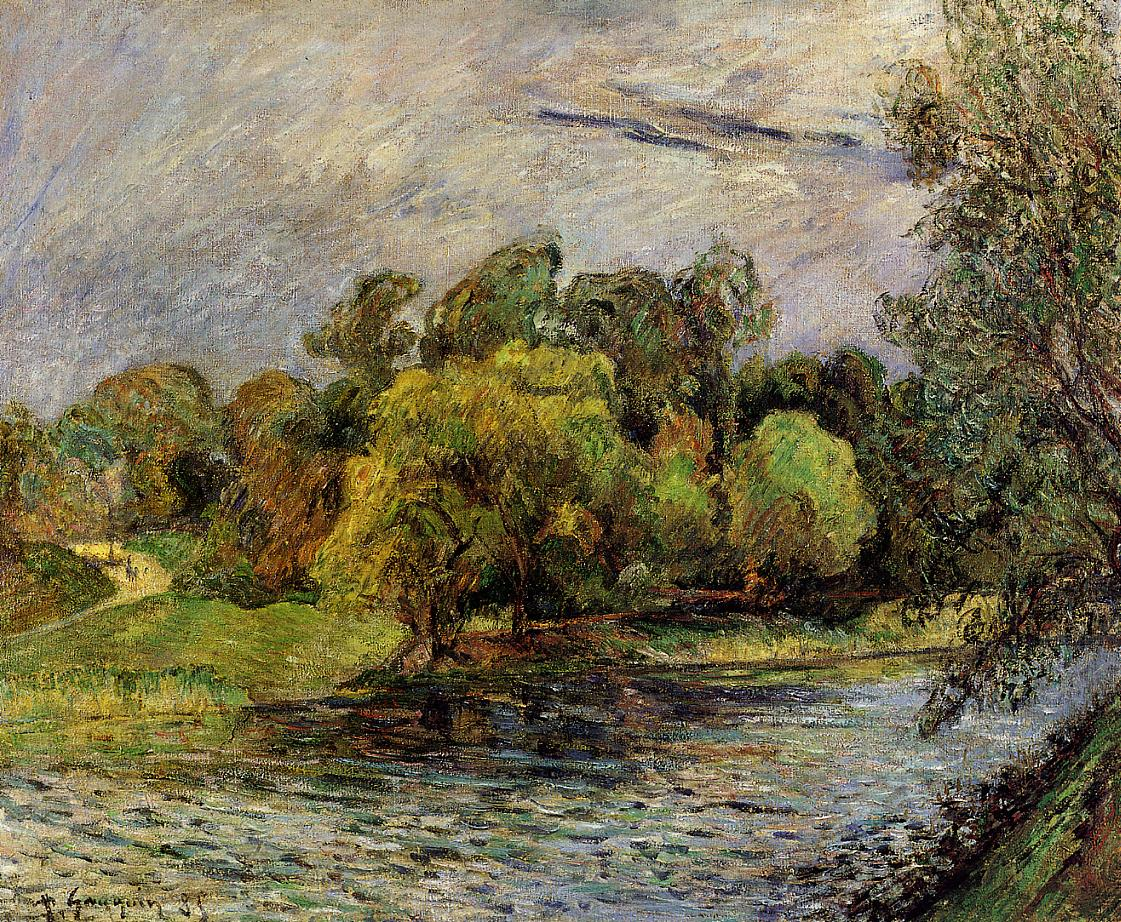
Østre Anlæg by Paul Gauguin, 1885

The new National Gallery opened in a corner of the park in 1896. The building was designed by Vilhelm Dahlerup. A few years later, the tobacco manufacturer Heinrich Hirschsprung offered to donate his art collection to the Danish state on condition that the state and City of Copenhagen would make a building available for its exhibition at a site close to the National Gallery. A small piece of the park located next to Stockholmsgade was made available to the project and the Hirschsprung Collection's building opened in 1911.

== Public art and monuments ==
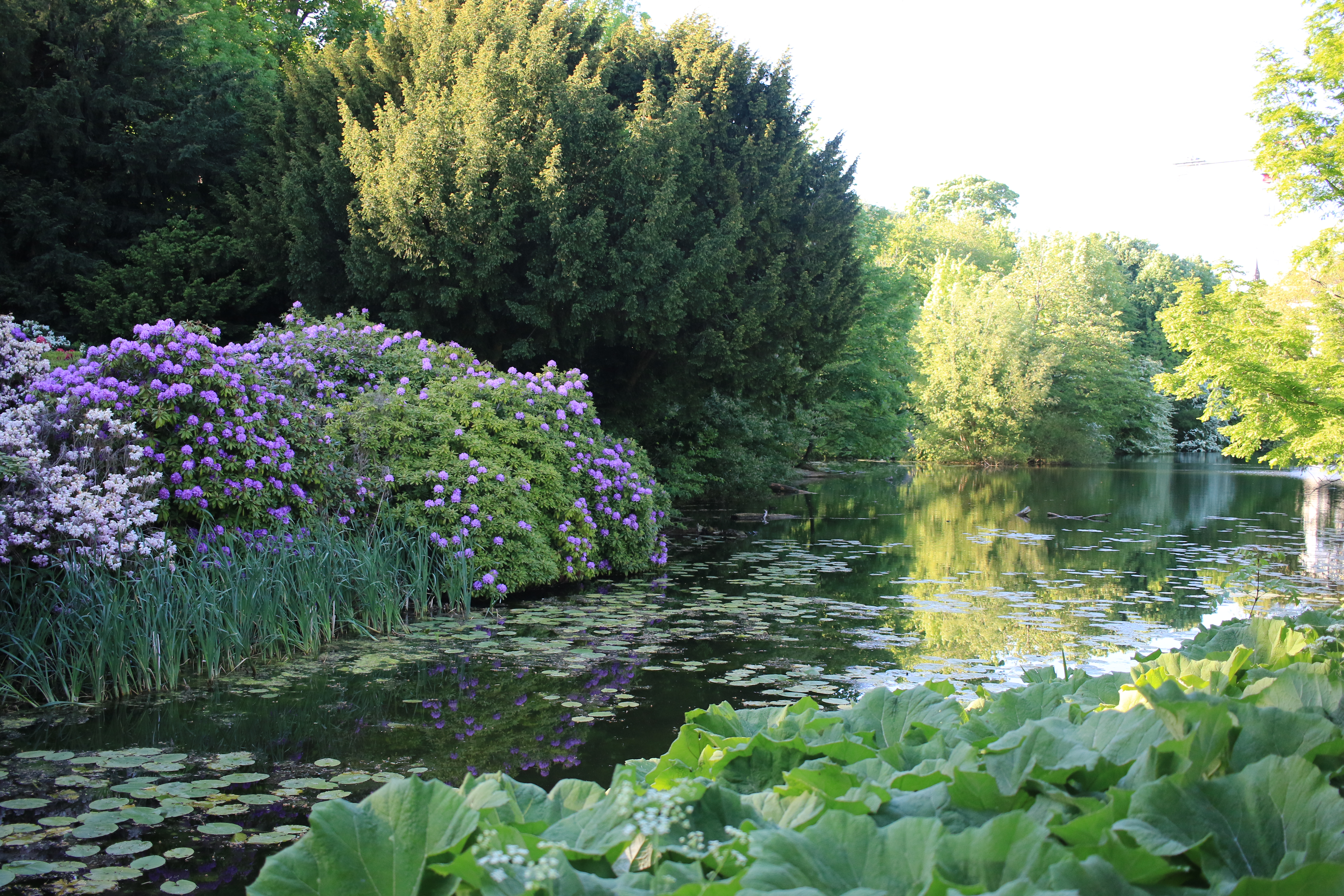
Lake Østre Anlæg

Lake Østre Anlæg

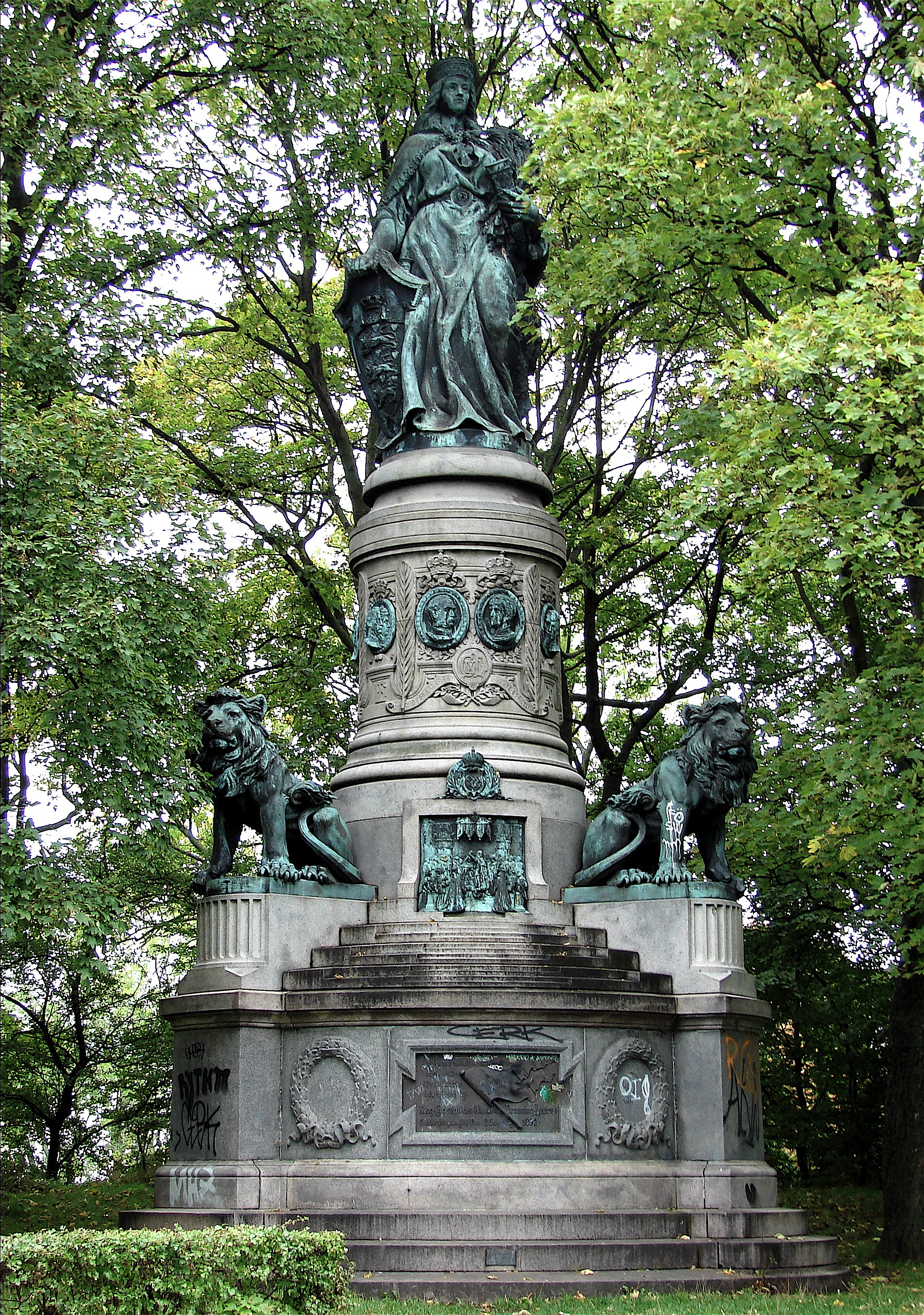
The Denmark Monument

The Denmark Monument, created in connection with Christian IX and Queen Louise's gold wedding, was originally located in front of the National Gallery. The monument, which was designed by Louis Hasselriis was poorly received by the public as well as critics. In 1919, it was decided to move it to its current location in Østre Anlæg.

The park is also home to a statue of the composer Niels W. Gade. Created by Vilhelm Bissen, it was originally located on Sankt Annæ Plads but later moved to its current location. Peder Severin Krøyer has created a bust of the poet Sophus Schandorph. Krøyer and Schandorph were friends. The bust is from 1888. The writer and educator Sophus Bauditz is commemorated with a bust located at the foot of Peuchlers Bastion. The memorial is from 1920 and was designed by Aksel Hansen from 1920. He played a role in the municipal school system for many years.

The youngest monument in the park is a memorial to the Ukrainian national poet Taras Shevchenko. It was designed by Sergej Boguslavskij unveiled on 24 September 2010 and was a gift from the Danish-Ukrainian Society. Close to the Sølvtorvet entrance stands Aron Jerndahl's sculpture Det går mod skumring from 1902.
