= List of companies based in Greater Copenhagen =

This is a list of major companies based in metropolitan Copenhagen, Denmark.

== List ==
| Company | Location | Industry |
|---|---|---|
| 3Shape | Copenhagen | Technology |
| Aller Media | Copenhagen | media |
| Alectia | Lyngby-Taarbæk | consulting |
| ALK-Abelló | Hørsholm | pharmaceuticals |
| Alm. Brand | Copenhagen | financial services |
| Ambu | Ballerup | health care |
| Arp-Hansen Hotel Group | Copenhagen | hospitality |
| Bech-Bruun | Copenhagen | law firm |
| Brødrene Hartmann | Gentofte | manufacturing |
| Carlsberg Group | Copenhagen | food and beverage |
| Chr. Olesen & Co. | Gentofte | Ingredients |
| Coloplast | Fredensborg | health care |
| Co-Ro Food | Fredensborg | food and beverage |
| Copenhagen Malmö Port | Lyngby-Taarbæk | transport and logistics |
| COWI | Copenhagen | consulting |
| DADES | Lyngby-Taarbæk | real estate |
| Danish Agro | Faxe | farm supply |
| Danske Bank | Copenhagen | financial services |
| DFDS | Copenhagen | transport and logistics |
| DLF-Trifolium | Roskilde | seed business |
| DR | Copenhagen | media |
| DSB | Høje-Taastrup | transport and logistics |
| DSV | Brøndby | transport and logistics |
| DT Group | Gladsaxe | retail |
| EAS | Copenhagen | trading |
| Egmont Group | Copenhagen | media |
| Falck | Copenhagen | rescue and assistance |
| FDB | Albertskund | retail |
| FLSmidth | Copenhagen | engineering |
| Foss A/S | Hillerød | technology |
| GN Store Nord | Ballerup | technology |
| Haldor Topsoe | Frederikssund | chemical |
| Hempel Group | Lyngby-Taarbæk | chemical |
| IC Group | Copenhagen | fashion |
| Imerco | Herlev | Retail |
| ISS A/S | Gladsaxe | service |
| JP/Politikens Hus | Copenhagen | media |
| Kivi-Tex | Ballerup | service |
| KMD | Ballerup | software and IT services |
| Kemp & Lauritzen | Albertslund | engineering |
| Københavns Lufthavne | Tårnby | transport and logistics |
| Lemvigh-Müller | Herlev | service |
| LEO Pharma | Ballerup | pharmaceuticals |
| Løgismose Meyers | Copenhagen | - |
| Lundbeck | Copenhagen | pharmaceuticals |
| Mærsk | Copenhagen | conglomerate |
| Matas | Allerød | retail |
| Maersk Line | Copenhagen | transport and logistics |
| MT Højgaard | Gladsaxe | construction |
| Netcompany | Copenhagen | IT |
| Netto | Køge | retail |
| NKT Holding | Brøndby | conglomerate |
| NNIT | Gladsaxe | software |
| Nomeco | Allerød | wholesaler |
| Norden | Gentofte | transport and logistics |
| North Media | Copenhagen | media |
| Novo Holdings A/S | Gentofte | holding company |
| Novo Nordisk | Gladsaxe | pharmaceuticals |
| Novozymes | Gladsaxe | biotech |
| Pandora | Glostrup | fashion |
| Parken Sport & Entertainment | Copenhagen | entertainment |
| Plesner | Copenhagen | law firm |
| Post Danmark | Copenhagen | transport and logistics |
| Ramboll | Copenhagen | consulting |
| Rockwool International | Høje-Taastrup | manufacturing |
| Saxo Bank | Gentofte | financial services |
| Sampension | Gentofte | financial services |
| Scan Group | Gentofte | transport and logistics |
| Scandinavian Tobacco Group | Gladsaxe | manufacturing |
| Sjællandske Medier | Ringsted | media |
| Sitecore | Copenhagen | Software |
| TDC A/S | Copenhagen | telecommunications |
| Toms International | Ballerup | food and beverage |
| Torm | Gentofte | transport and logistics |
| Tryg | Ballerup | financial services |
| Velux | Hørsholm | manufacturing |
| Welltec | Allerød | technology |
| Widex | Allerød | technology |
| William Demant | Egedal | health care |

== See also ==
- List of companies of Denmark

== See also ==
- 2014 Berlingske Gold 1000
