= Lists of Copenhagen topics =

This list of Copenhagen topics provides an overview of lists related to Copenhagen, Denmark.

== Buildings and structures ==
- List of churches in Copenhagen
- List of museums in and around Copenhagen
- List of Copenhagen Metro stations
- List of public art in Copenhagen
  - List of public art in Rosenborg Castle Gardens
  - List of public art in Ørstedsparken
  - List of public art in Copenhagen Botanical Garden
  - List of public art in Copenhagen

== Geography ==
- Districts of Copenhagen
- List of parks and open spaces in Copenhagen

== Culture ==
- List of songs about Copenhagen
- List of annual events in metropolitan Copenhagen

== Economy ==
- List of companies based in metropolitan Copenhagen

== Sport ==
- List of F.C. Copenhagen Players of the Year
- List of F.C. Copenhagen managers
- List of F.C. Copenhagen players

== History ==
- Timeline of Copenhagen history
- List of lord mayors of Copenhagen
