= Jerichau family =

The Jerichaus were a family of Danish artists:

- Jens Adolf Jerichau (1816–1883), a sculptor
- Elisabeth Jerichau-Baumann (1819–1881), his wife, a painter, originally from Poland

Their sons:

- Thorald Jerichau (1848-1909), an organist and composer
- Harald Jerichau (1851–1878), a landscape painter
- Holger H. Jerichau (1861-1900), a landscape painter

- Jens Adolf Jerichau (1890-1916), Holger's son, an expressionist painter
