= List of public art in Ørstedsparken =

This is a list of public art in Ørstedsparken in Copenhagen, Denmark.

== List ==
Image	Title / individual commemorated	Sculptor	Created	Installed	Source
	H. C. Ørsted Memorial	Jens Adolf Jerichau		1871	Source
	Dying Gaul; Døende galler	Unknown	3rd century BC	1889	source
	Silenus with the Infant Bacchus	Lysippos (replica)	4th century BC	1880	Source
	Jeanne d'Arc at Domrémy Listening to the Heavenly Voice'	Henri Chapu	1870	1882	Source
	Satyr with Crotales	Unknown	C. 300 BC	1886	Source
	Satyr with the Infant Bacchus	Unknown	4th century BC	1886	Source
	Arrotino	Unknown	C. 250-200 BC	1886	Source
	Apollo Belvedere	Leochares (replica)	4th century BC	1886	Source
	Hermes Resting			1886	Source
	Apollo Sauroctonos	Unknown	C. 350 BC	1887	Source
	Resting Satyr	Unknown	C. 350 BC		Source
	Boy Satyr Playing the Flute	Unknown	4th century BC	1887	Source
	The Wrestlers	Unknown	3rd century BC	1887	
	Lauritz Nicolai Hvidt	Herman Wilhelm Bissen/Vilhelm Bissen		1876	
	Boy Satyr Imbibing Wine	Louis Hasselriis		1888	Source
	Anders Sandøe Ørsted	Vilhelm Bissen	1902		
	Natalie Zahle	Ludvig Brandstrup		1916	Source
	Bertel Thorvaldsen	Einar Utzon-Frank		1954	

== See also ==
- List of public art in Rosenborg Castle Gardens
- List of public art in Copenhagen Botanical Garden
- List of public art in Copenhagen
