= Herstedvester Church =

Church building in Albertslund Municipality, Denmark

Coordinates: 55°40′38″N 12°20′20″E

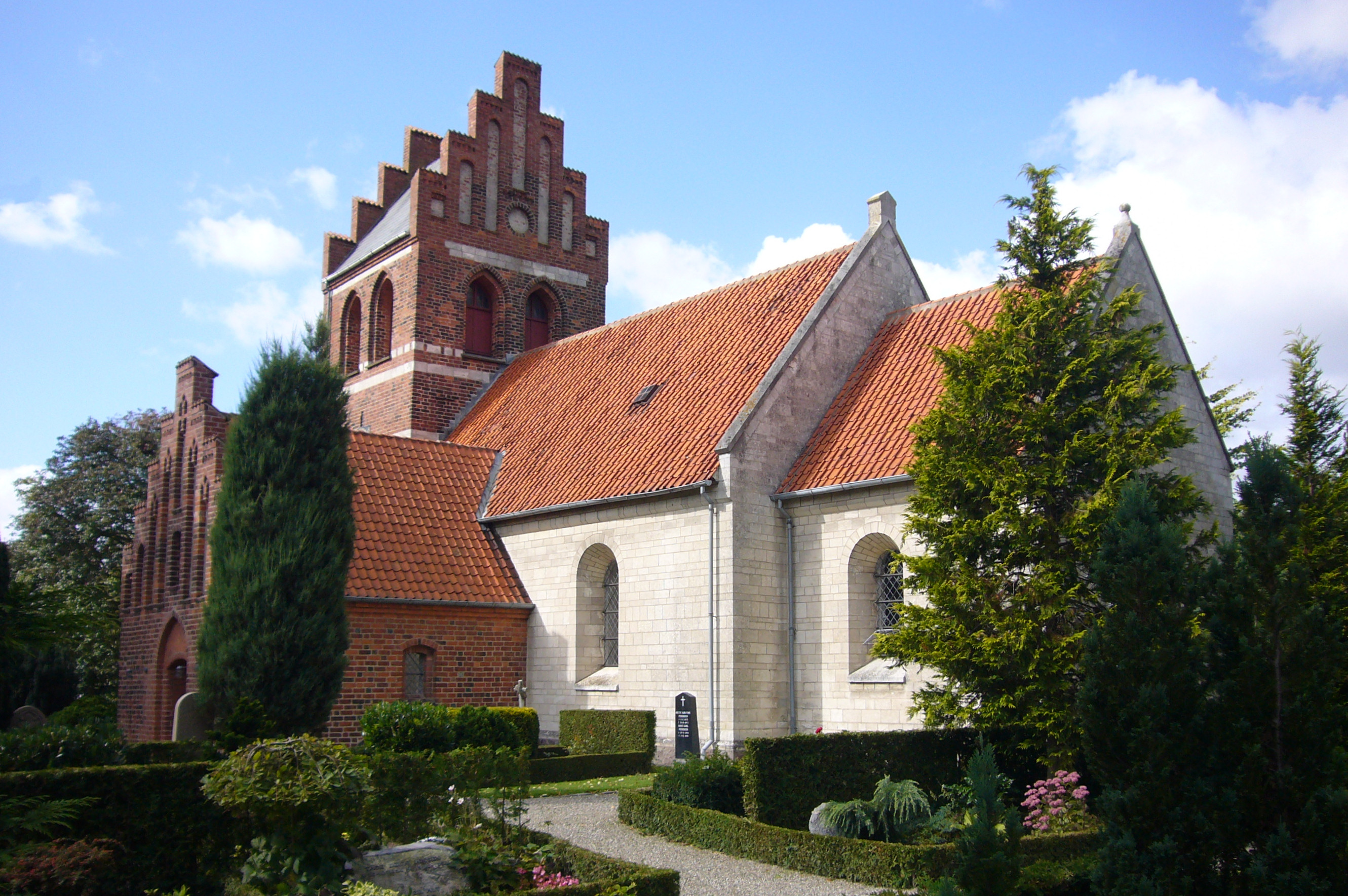

Herstedvester Church (Danish: Herstedvester Kirke) is a church in the northwestern outskirts of Albertslund, Albertslund Municipality, Denmark. The church is dated to around 1100.
