= Herstedøster Church =

Church in Albertslund Municipality, Denmark

Coordinates: 55°41′5.57″N 12°22′15.04″E

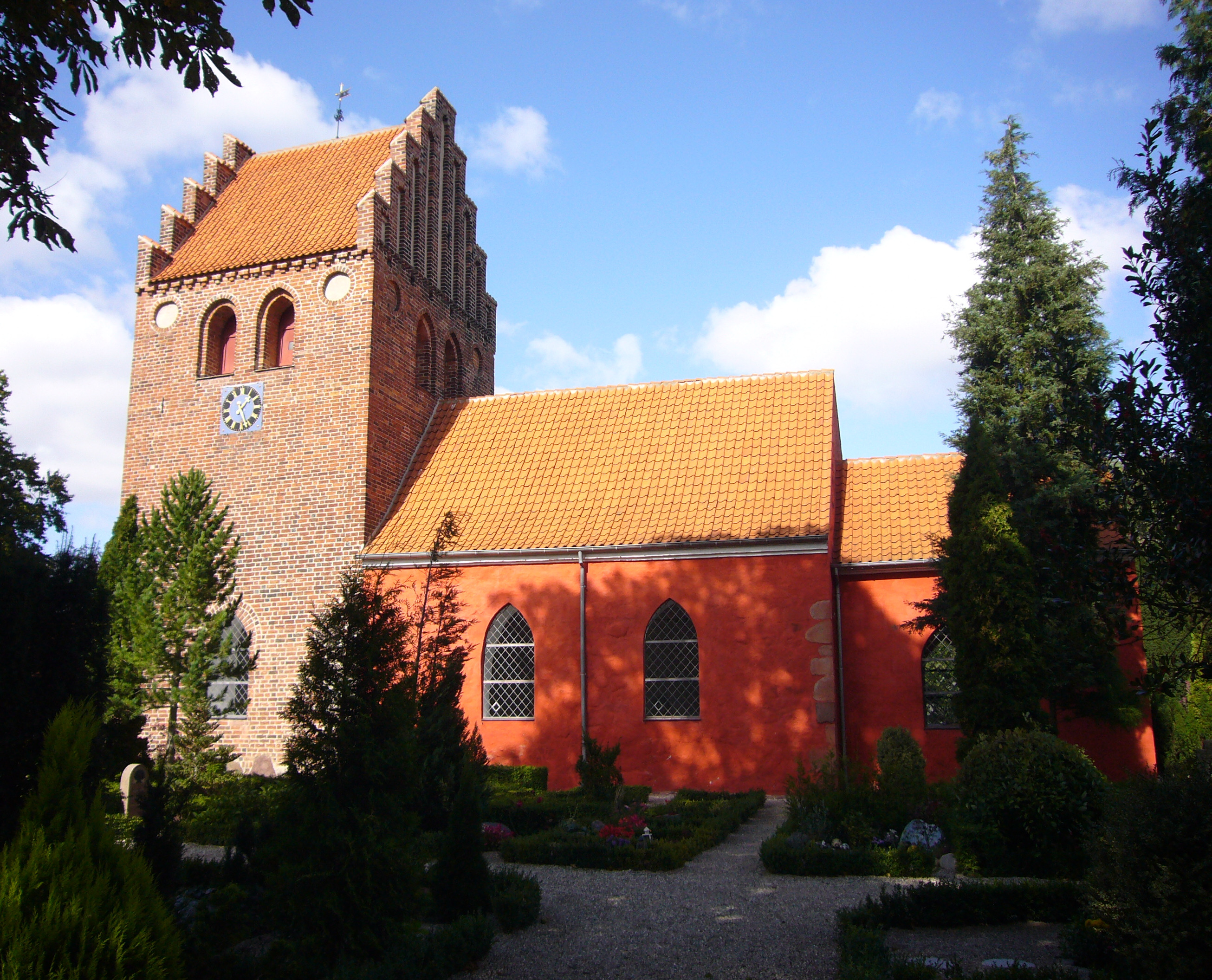

Herstedøster Church (Danish: Herstedøster Kirke) is located on the northern outskirts of Albertslund, Albertslund Municipality, Denmark. In medieval times, the Romanesque church was dedicated to Saint Nicholas. Its tower dates from the late-Gothic period, reflecting architectural developments added after the original construction. The church interior was given a major renovation in 1994 by Alan Havsteen-Mikkelsen. In 1973, R. Smalley discovered frescoes dated to around 1175, probably the date of origin of the church. On 1 February 2009, a major fire broke out at the church.
