= Harald Jerichau =

Danish landscape painter

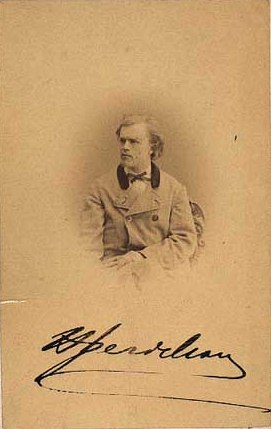
- Born: August 17, 1851; Copenhagen, Demark
- Died: March 6, 1878 (aged 26); Rome, Italy
- Parents: Elisabeth Jerichau-Baumann; Jens Adolf Jerichau
- Family: Jerichau family

Harald Adolf Nikolaj Jerichau (18 August 1851 – 6 March 1878) was a Danish landscape painter. He was part of the Jerichau family of artists.

== Biography ==
Jerichau was born in Copenhagen, Denmark. His father was the sculptor Jens Adolf Jerichau, and his mother was the painter Elisabeth Jerichau-Baumann. His younger brother, Holger H. Jerichau, also became a painter, while his older brother, Thorald Jerichau, was a composer.

He received his first formal drawing lessons from the architect C. V. Nielsen, then studied perspective at the Royal Danish Academy of Fine Arts in 1868. Later, he received lessons from Frederik Christian Lund and Eiler Rasmussen Eilersen. Jerichau first exhibited in Copenhagen in 1873.

This was followed by a trip to Italy with his mother. In Rome, he was a pupil of Jean-Achille Benouville, who at that time was director of the French Academy. After six months there, he made a study trip to Turkey and Greece, spent some time in Paris, visited Switzerland, and, in 1874, returned to Istanbul with his mother. During this time, he continued to exhibit in Copenhagen.

Since he was a boy, he had been engaged to his cousin, Maria Kutzner, who was the daughter of his mother's sister. In 1875, she came to Istanbul and they were married. Their first child died at the age of three months. Believing the climate in Turkey to be unfavorable, they moved to Naples. A year later, Maria became violently ill and died in November 1876.

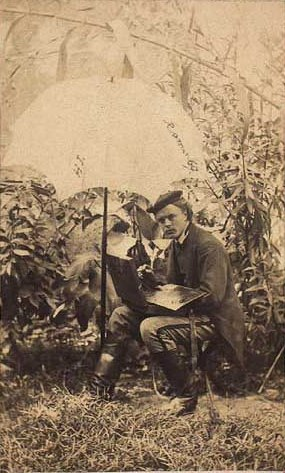
Harald Jerichau (1869)

In the aftermath of the death of his wife, he considered suicide but slowly regained his will to live. In 1878, just as he was beginning to restart his career, he died from a combination of typhus and "Italian ague" (malaria). He was buried at the Protestant Cemetery, Cimitero Acattolico at Testaccio in Rome.

His mother completed a book of remembrance, Til erindring om Harald Jerichau, which was first published during 1879. In 1879, a small exhibition of his works was held in Copenhagen, featuring scenes painted in Turkey that had been commissioned by the brewer, J.C. Jacobsen. Among the works on display was The Plain at Sardes (1878) which had completed during his travels.

== Selected paintings ==
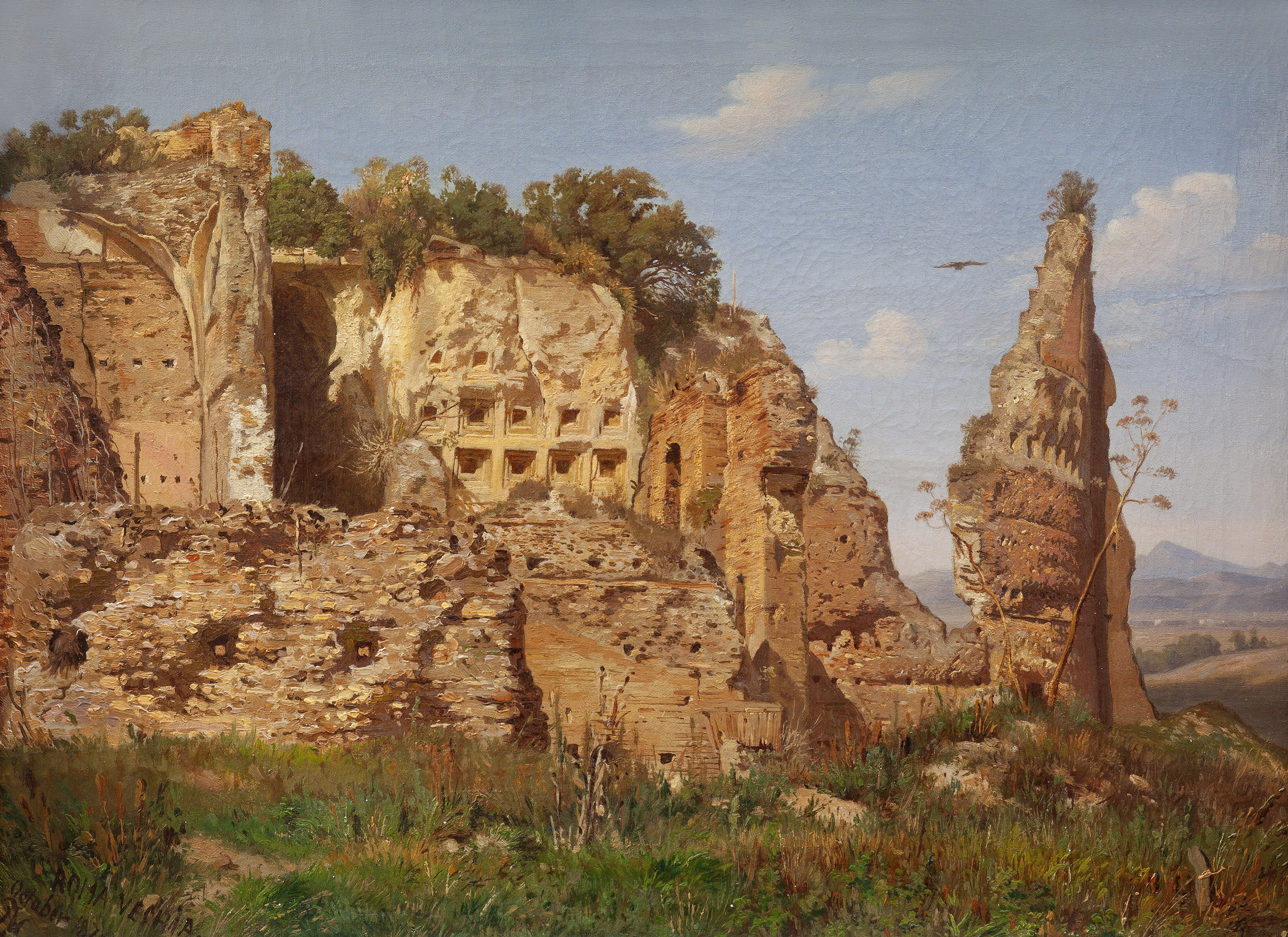
Villa dei Quintili near Via Appia (1870)

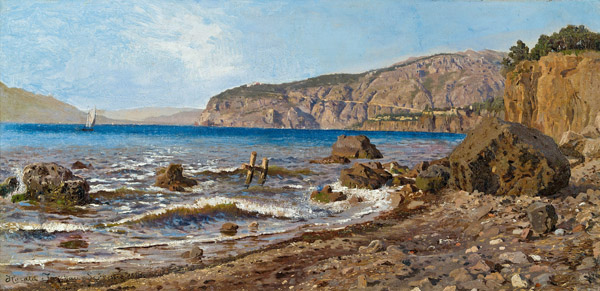
Coast near Sorrento (1870)

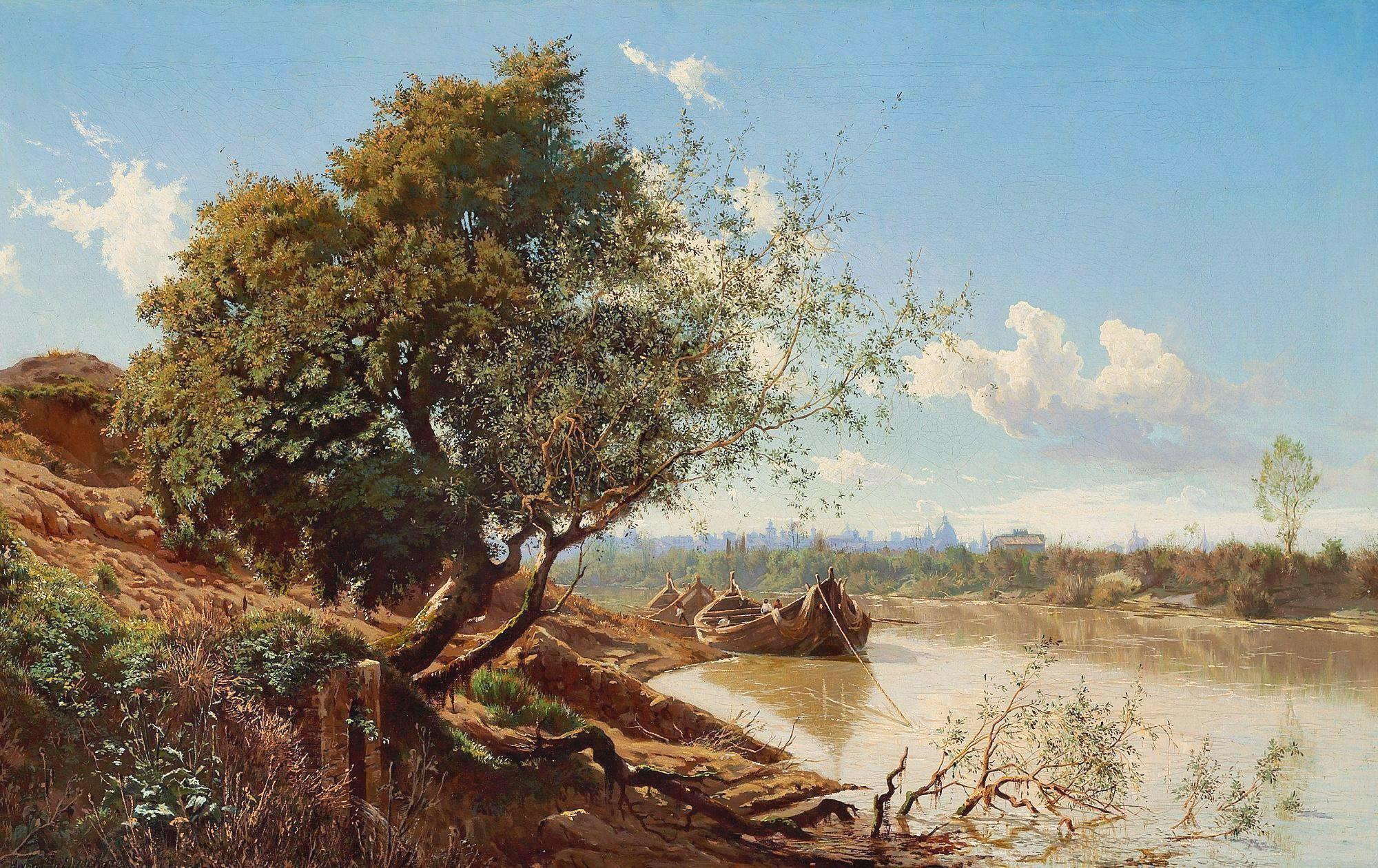
Boats Anchored on the Tiber (1871)

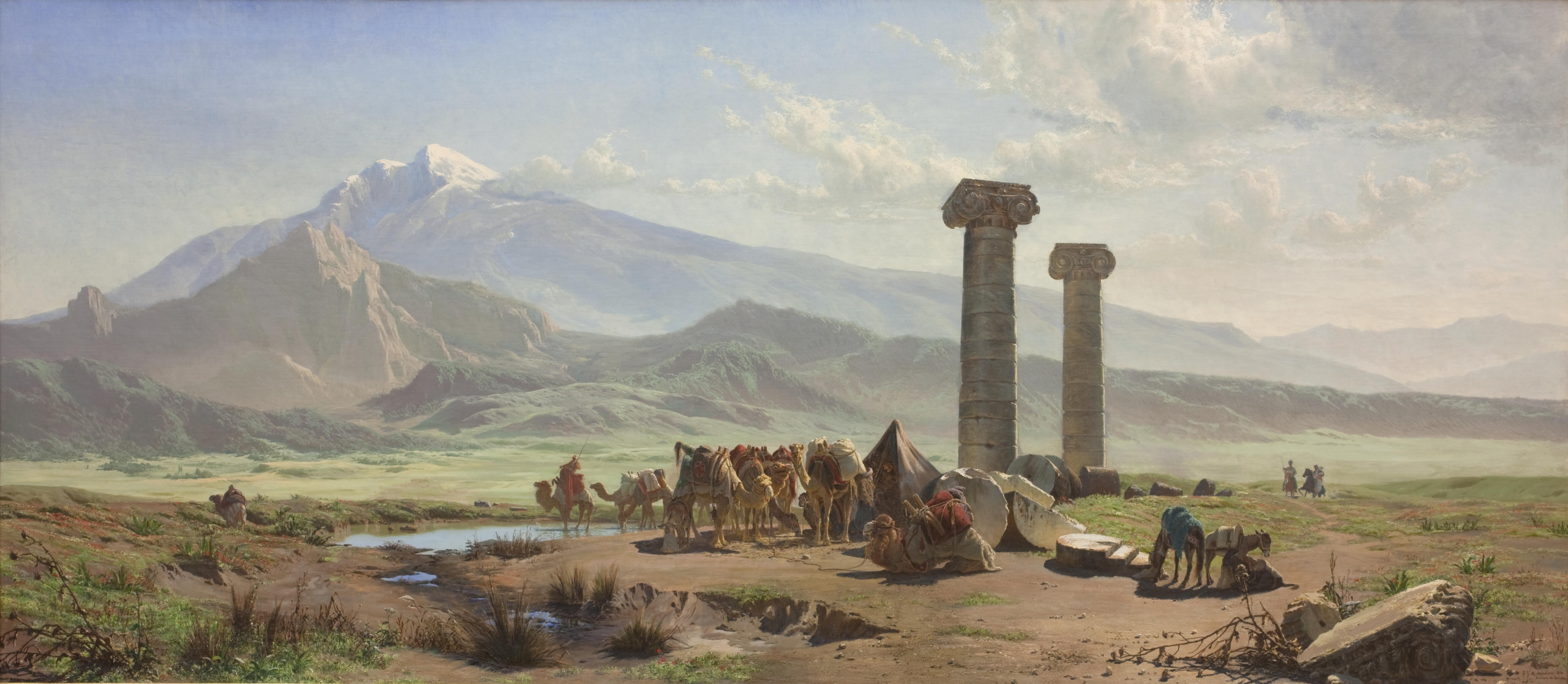
The Plain at Sardes (1878)
