= Thorald Jerichau =

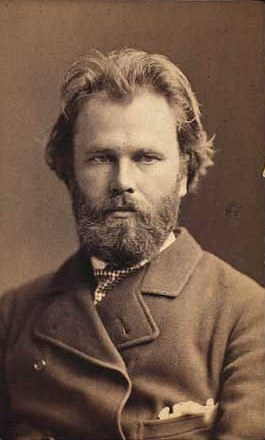
Thorald Jerichau; photograph by Jens Petersen

Thorald Harald Adolph Carol Lorentz Jerichau (1 November 1848, Copenhagen – 25 December 1909, Christiania) was a Danish organist and composer.

== Life and work ==
He was born to the sculptor, Jens Adolf Jerichau, and his wife, Elisabeth Jerichau Baumann, who was an artist. His brothers, Harald and Holger, both became landscape painters. He was named after the artist, Thorald Læssøe, who was a close friend of the family.

As a composer, he was not very successful. An original three-line sheet music system that he invented was never used, although he put much time and effort into promoting it. Discouraged by his failure, he destroyed all of the compositions he had written with the system. By chance, one copy survived: a series of marches for piano that he had given to a young boy on the island of Bogø.

For many years, he was employed as an organist in Horsens then, in 1890, went to the United States, where he began a concert tour and, allegedly, served as head of a music conservatory. Upon returning from America, he effectively took charge of his young nephew (his brother Holger's son), Jens Adolf. Holger had died in 1900, when Jens Adolf was only ten years old. When Thorald died in 1909, Jens Adolf inherited 5,110 kroner that enabled him to begin his career as a painter; a career that was cut short by his suicide at the age of twenty-five.

== Sources ==
- Svend Bay-Schmith, "Thorald Jerichau's tre-liniede Nodesystem", In: Dansk Musik Tidsskrift, #8, vol.19 (1944). (Online)
- Anthon Maaløe, En Pressemands Erindringer, Funkis Forlag, (1934), pp. 63–71
- Brief biographies of the Jerichau family @ Kavalerboligerne (Residents of Hørsholm: 1890–1916)
