= Hans Christian Ørsted Monument =

Statue in Copenhagen, Denmark

The Physicist Hans Christian Ørsted
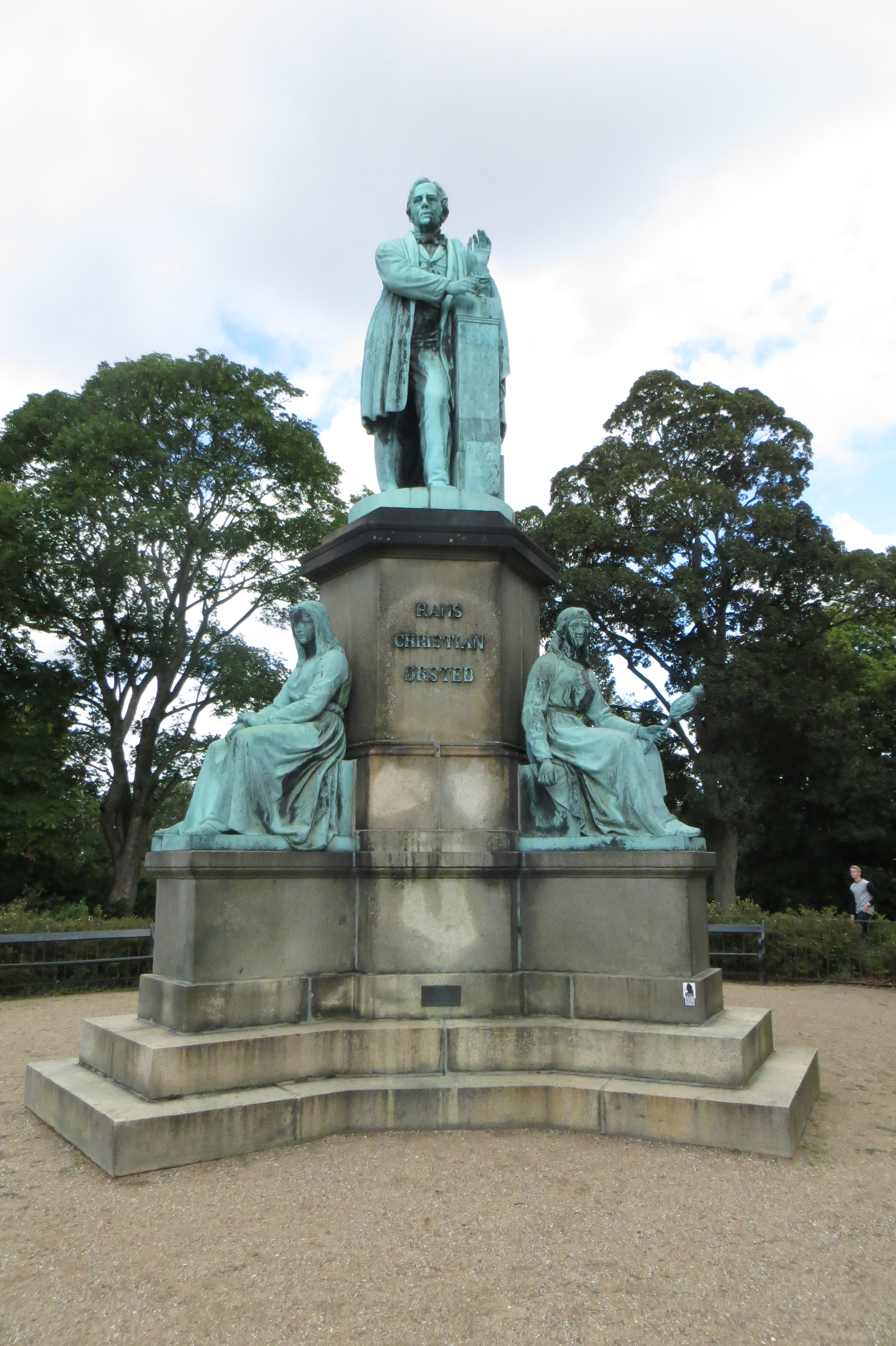
- Monument to H. C. Ørsted
- Year: 1876
- Medium: Bronze
- Subject: Hans Christian Ørsted
- Location: Copenhagen; 55°40′51″N 12°34′03″E

The Physicist Hans Christian Ørsted (Danish: Fysikeren Hans Christian Ørsted) is a monument to Hans Christian Ørsted located in Ørsted Park in central Copenhagen, Denmark.

== Description ==
The monument consists of a bronze statue of Ørsted mounted on a granite plinth. Ørsted is seen demonstrating the effect of an electric current on a magnetic needle. With his hands he is connecting the wires from an electric battery, thereby making a magnet oscillate. At the foot of the statue sit the three Norns or goddesses of destiny in Norse mythology, Urðr (the past) who is noting the past, and Ørsted's name, on a tablet, Verðandi (the present), who with her distaff is spinning the thread of fate, and Skuld (the future), who is silently awaiting the fullness of time with a rune stick in her hand.

== History ==
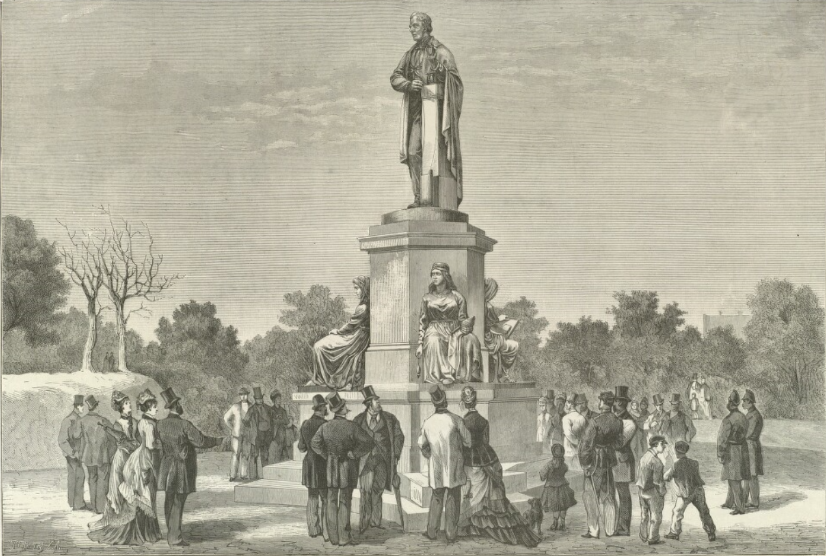
The H. C. Ørsted Monument in 1876

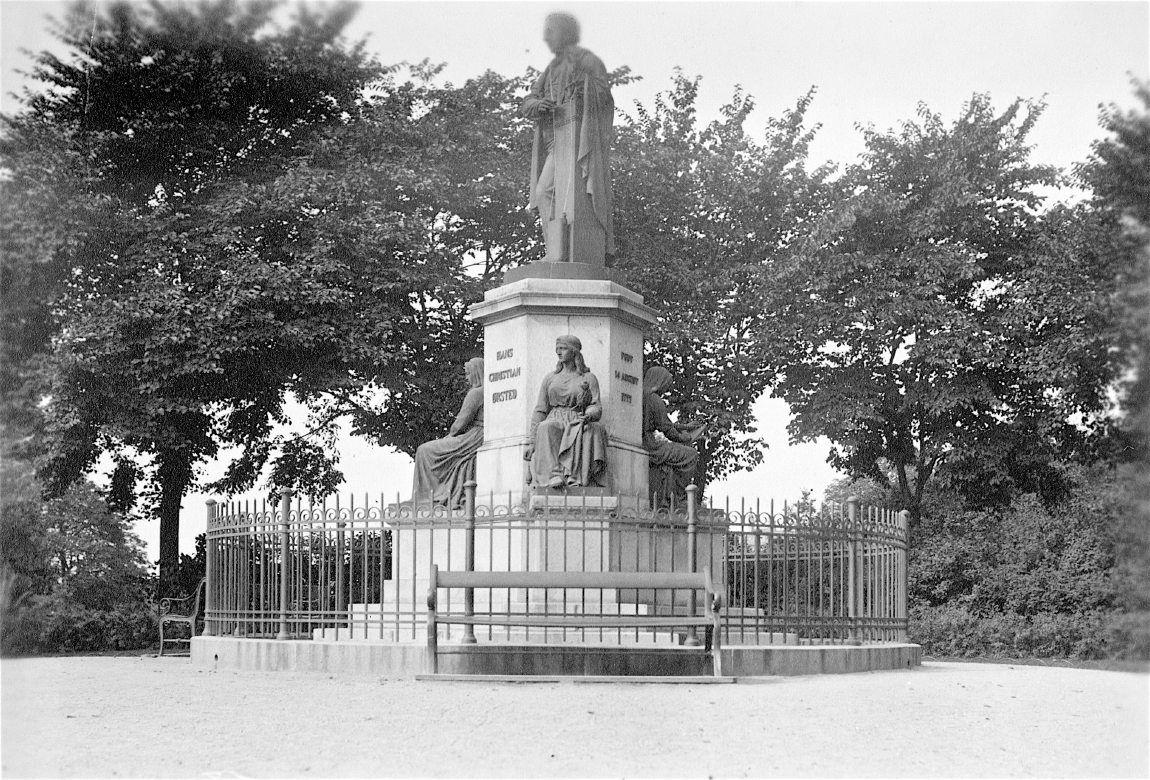
The H. C. Ørsted Monument photographed by Fritz Theodor Benzen in September 1902

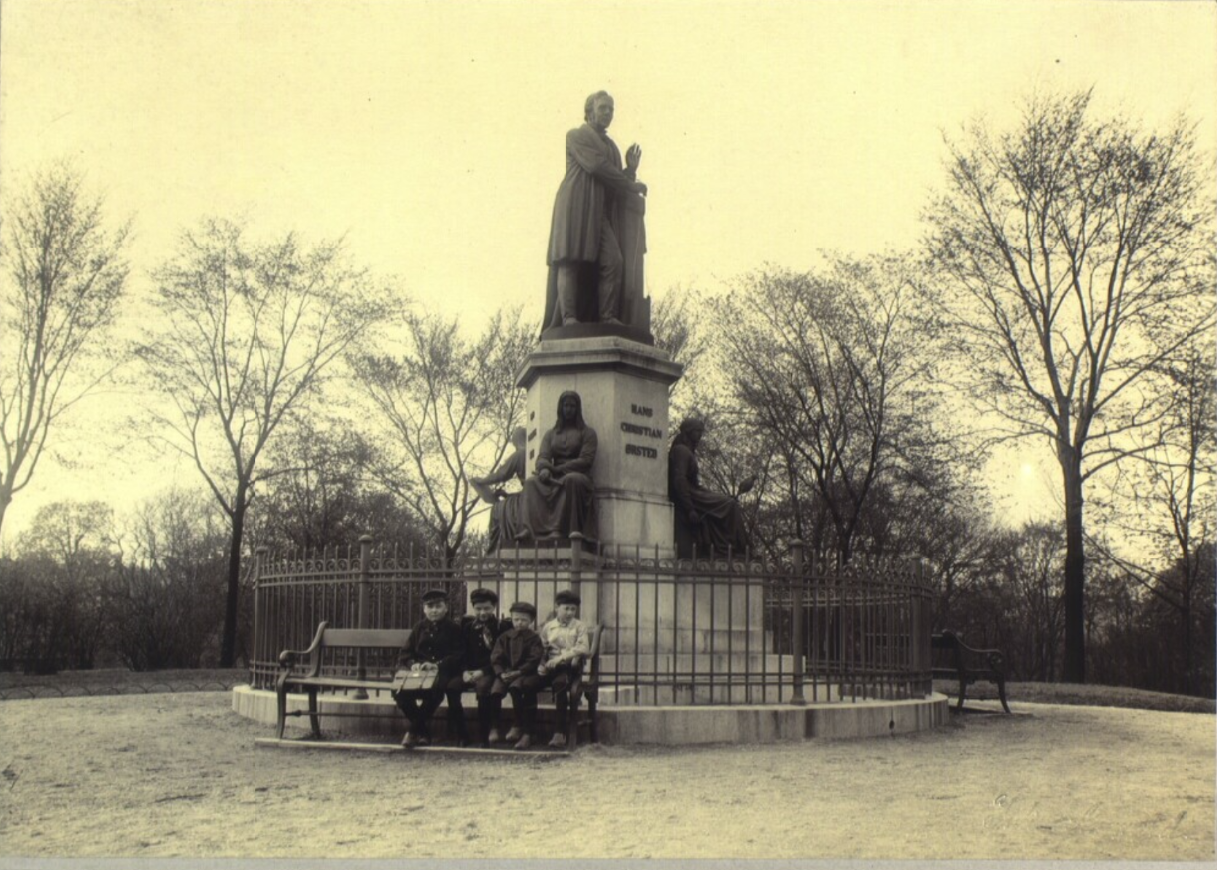
The H. C. Ørsted Monument photographed by Julius Aagaard

The idea for the monument was conceived in early 1860 by Elisabeth Jerichau-Baumann as mentioned by Hans Christian Andersen in Mit livs eventyr. A committee was set up but it would take 16 years before the monument was inaugurated. The committee consisted of the politician Frederik Ferdinand Tillisch, professor Johan Georg Forchhammer, Ole Berendt Suhr and Hans Christian Andersen. The committee had its first meeting on 2 October 1861. Jens Adolf Jerichau was given the task of designing the monument. Forchhammer died in 1865 and was replaced by J. C. Jacobsen in 1867. In 1873, they began to raise money for the bronze figures. They were cast in C. F. Holm's foundry at Gammel Mønt.

The monument was erected on the former Holck's Bastion, when work on the park just started. The statue was finally inaugurated on 25 September 1876.

== See also ==
- List of public art in Copenhagen
- List of public art in Ørstedsparken
