= Rudkøbing Pharmacy =

Former pharmacy in Denmark

Coordinates: 54°56′13″N 10°42′29″E

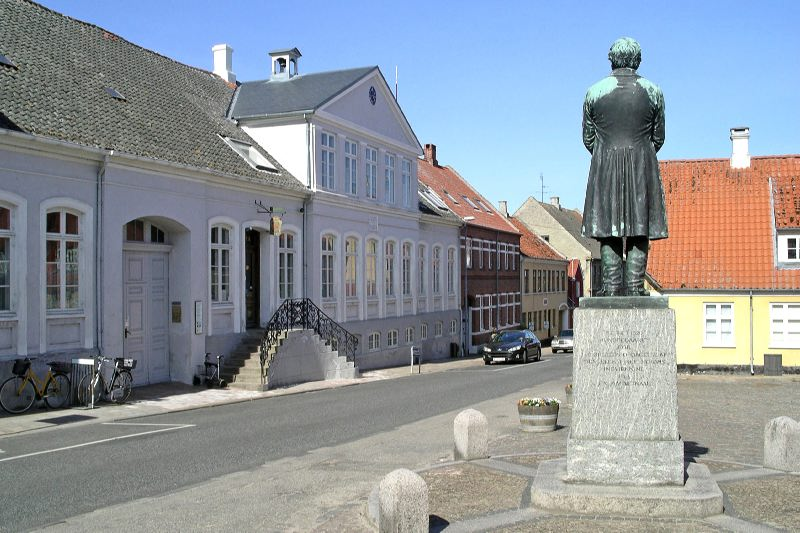
Rudkøbing Pharmacy

Rudkøbing Pharmacy (Danish: Rudkøbing Apotek) has since its foundation in 1705 been located at Brogade 15 in Rudkøbing on the island of Langeland, Denmark. The current buildings were constructed in the 1850s and have been listed in the Danish registry of protected buildings and places. The former laboratory and a storage room on the first floor are operated as a museum under the name Det Gamle Apotek by Rudkøbing Museum.

== History ==
The pharmacy at Brogade 15 was founded on 2 November 1705 by Christopher Becker. The founder's paternal uncle, Johann Gottfried Becker, was the owner of the Elephant Pharmacy on Købmagergade in Copenhagen.

A later owner was pharmacist Søren Christian Ørsted, the father of physicist Hans Christian Ørsted and jurist and politician Anders Sandøe Ørsted, who purchased the pharmacy in 1776.

The pharmacy was for three generations, between 1854 and 1973, owned by the Bauer family.

Prominent figures who have visited the pharmacy include Adam Oehlenschläger, Herman Bang, Johannes V. Jensen and Agnes and Poul Henningsen.

== Buildings ==
The current Neoclassical building complex was constructed in 1856. It consists of a main wing towards the street and two side wings that project from the rear side of the building as well as a garden pavilion. The buildings surround a cobbled courtyard. The buildings were refurbished in the 1870s.

== List of owners ==
- 2.11.1705-xx.xx.1741 Gottfried Christopher Becker
- 13.10.1741-xx.xx.1772 Andreas Jørgensen
- 08.091773-xx.xx.1774 Hans Venninghausen
- xx.xx.1774-xx.xx.1776 Hans Holm
- 05.06.1776-xx.xx.1806 Søren Christian Ørsted
- 03.10.1806-xx.xx.1841 Anton Jacobæus
- 02.10.1841-xx.xx.1854 Frederik Wengel
- 21.12.1854-31.12.1888 August Fridolin Bauer
- 14.02.1889-30.06.1925 Christian August Pilegaard Bauer
- 29.06.1925-31.05.1973 Axel Bauer
- 16.03.1973-30.04.1996 Per Ratlau Berg
- 01.03.1996- Hanne Mouritsen
