= Kivi-Tex =

Services company headquartered in Copenhagen, Denmark

- Company type: Private limited company
- Industry: Service
- Founded: 1958
- Founder: K.P. Thorgaard
- Headquarters: Ballerup, Copenhagen, Denmark
- Key people: Eikemo Thorgård (CEO), Kristian Peter Thorgaard (chairman)
- Services: B-to-B laundry, textile rentale
- Revenue: DKK 1.472 billion (2015)
- Number of employees: 2,660

Kivi-Tex is a services company headquartered in Copenhagen, Denmark. It is the holding company of the textile services company De Forenede Dampvaskerier (DFD) and Elite Miljø.

== History ==
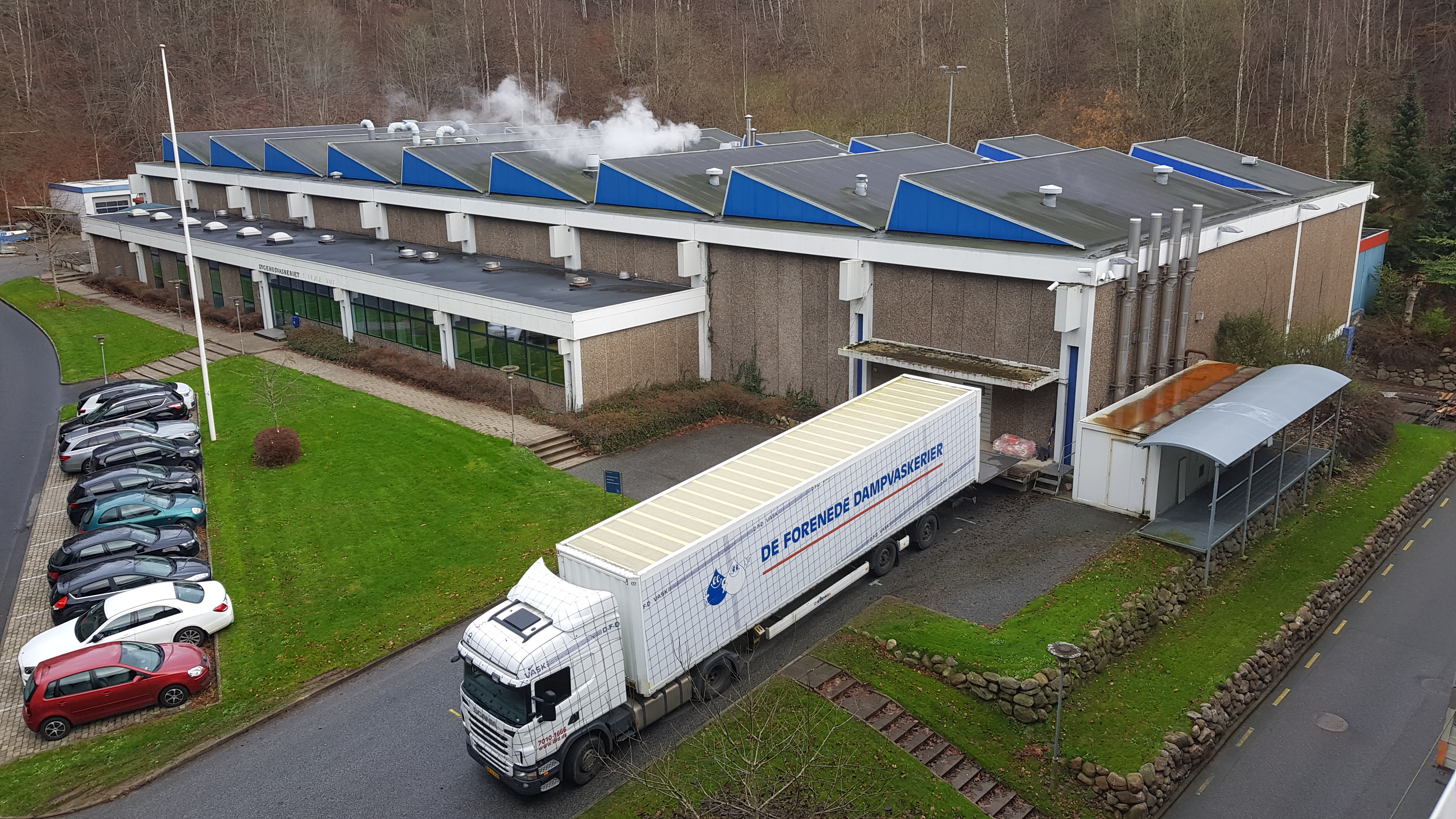
Truck at Sygehusvaskeriet in Vejle

De Forenede Dampvaskerier was founded by Kristian Peter Thorgaard when he Lunds Lunds Kitteldepot in 1958. In 1961, he acquired another company, Kivi. The name of his company was changed to Kivi Kittel and later to Kivi-Tex.

Kivi-Tex acquired Danish service company Elite Miljø in 2004. In 2017, it acquired Swedish textile services company Textilia from Accent Equity.

== Operations ==
De Forenede Dampvaskerier operates 20 laundries in Scandinavia.
