= Hans Christian Ørsted =

Danish chemist and physicist (1777–1851)

Hans Christian Ørsted ForMemRS FRSE
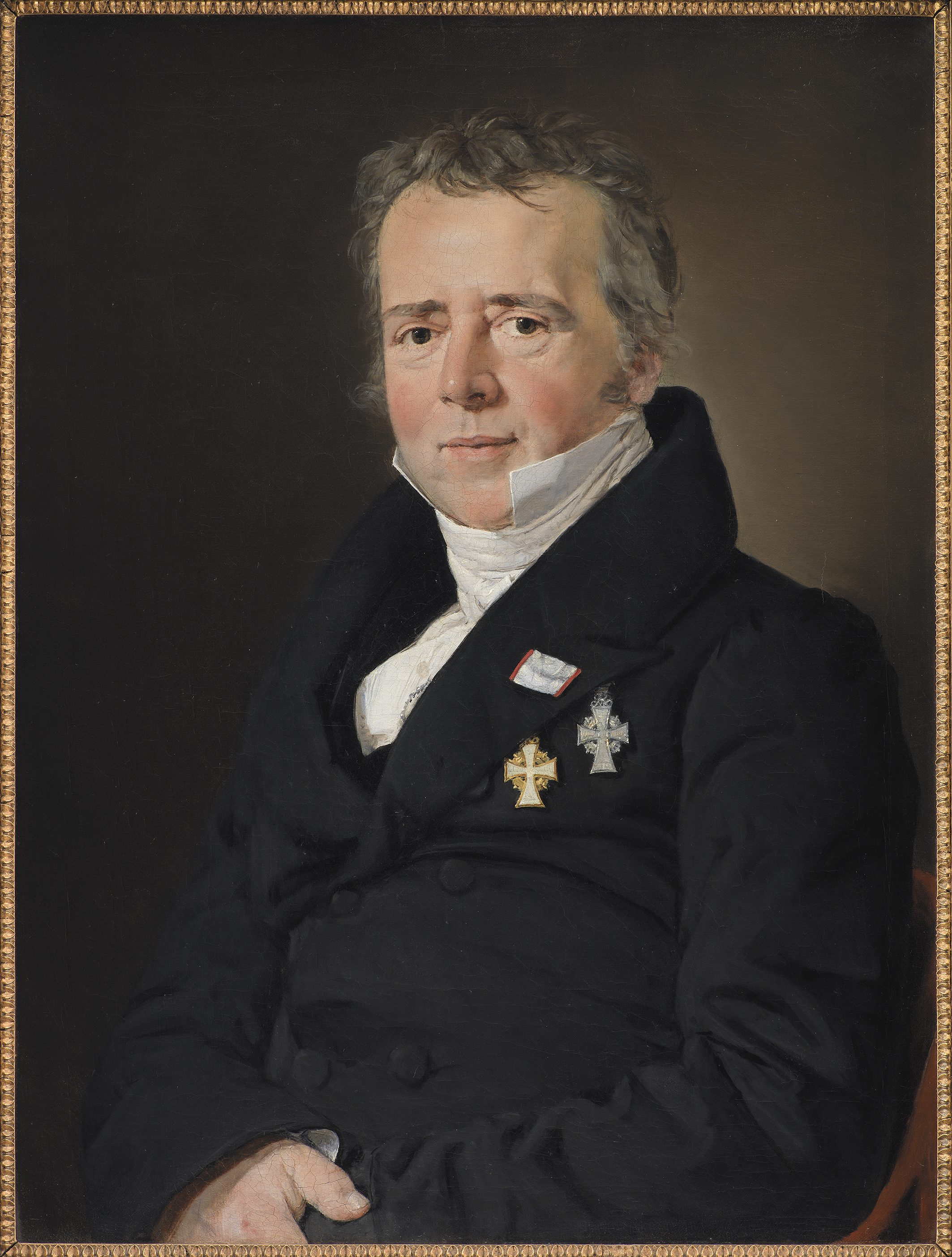
- Born: 14 August 1777; Rudkøbing, Denmark–Norway
- Died: 9 March 1851 (aged 73); Copenhagen, Denmark
- Resting place: Assistens Cemetery, Copenhagen
- Monuments: The Physicist Hans Christian Ørsted, Copenhagen
- Education: University of Copenhagen (PhD)
- Era: Danish Golden Age
- Known for: Coining the term thought experiment (c. 1812); Discovering piperine (1819); Oersted's law (1820); Discovering aluminium (1824)
- Relatives: Anders Sandøe Ørsted (brother)
- Awards: Copley Medal (1820)
- Honors: Pour le Mérite for Sciences and Arts (1842)
- Scientific career
- Fields: Chemistry; physics
- Workplaces: University of Copenhagen (1806–1851)
- Thesis: The Architectonics of Natural Metaphysics (1799)

Hans Christian Ørsted (Danish: [ˈɶɐ̯steð]; 14 August 1777 – 9 March 1851), sometimes transliterated as Oersted (Note: Depending on orthography and editorial convention, it may also be rendered Orsted or Örsted.) (/ˈɜːrstɛd/ UR-sted), was a Danish chemist and physicist who discovered that electric currents create magnetic fields. This phenomenon is known as Oersted's law. He also discovered aluminium, a chemical element.

A leader of the Danish Golden Age, Ørsted was a close friend of Hans Christian Andersen and the brother of politician and jurist Anders Sandøe Ørsted, who served as Prime Minister of Denmark from 1853 to 1854.

== Early life and studies ==
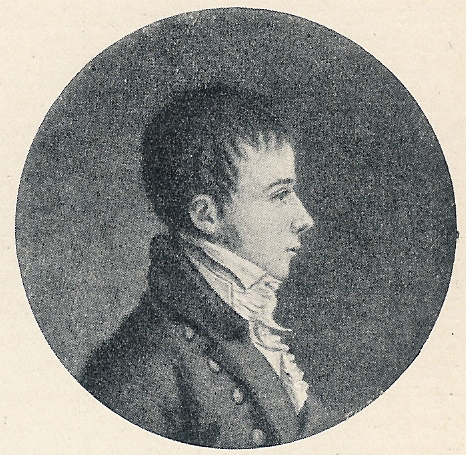
Ørsted as a youth

Ørsted was born in Rudkøbing in 1777. As a young boy he developed an interest in science while working for his father, who was a pharmacist in the town's pharmacy. He and his brother Anders received most of their early education through self-study at home, going to Copenhagen in 1793 to take entrance exams for the University of Copenhagen, where both brothers excelled academically. By 1796, Ørsted had been awarded honors for his papers in both aesthetics and physics. He earned his doctorate in 1799 for a dissertation based on the works of Kant entitled The Architectonics of Natural Metaphysics.

In 1800, Alessandro Volta reported his invention of the voltaic pile, which inspired Ørsted to investigate the nature of electricity and to conduct his first electrical experiments. In 1801, Ørsted received a travel scholarship and public grant which enabled him to spend three years traveling across Europe. He toured science headquarters throughout the continent, including in Berlin and Paris.

In Germany, Ørsted met Johann Wilhelm Ritter, a physicist who believed there was a connection between electricity and magnetism. This idea made sense to Ørsted as he subscribed to Kantian thought regarding the unity of nature. Ørsted's conversations with Ritter drew him into the study of physics. He became a professor at the University of Copenhagen in 1806 and continued research on electric currents and acoustics. Under his guidance the university developed a comprehensive physics and chemistry program and established new laboratories.

Ørsted welcomed William Christopher Zeise to his family home in autumn 1806. He granted Zeise a position as his lecturing assistant and took the young chemist under his tutelage. In 1812, Ørsted again visited Germany and France after publishing Videnskaben om Naturens Almindelige Love and Første Indledning til den Almindelige Naturlære (1811).

Ørsted was the first modern thinker to explicitly describe and name the thought experiment. He used the Latin-German term Gedankenexperiment circa 1812 and the German term Gedankenversuch in 1820.

In 1819 Ørsted was the first to extract piperine and subsequently name it. He extracted it from Piper nigrum, the plant from which are obtained both white and black pepper.

Ørsted designed a new type of piezometer to measure the compressibility of liquids in 1822.

== Electromagnetism ==
A compass needle with a wire, showing the effect Ørsted discovered

In 1820, Ørsted published his discovery that a compass needle was deflected from magnetic north by a nearby electric current, confirming a direct relationship between electricity and magnetism. The often reported story that Ørsted made this discovery incidentally during a lecture is a myth. He had, in fact, been looking for a connection between electricity and magnetism since 1818, but was quite confused by the results he was obtaining.

His initial interpretation was that magnetic effects radiate from all sides of a wire carrying an electric current, as do light and heat. Three months later, he began more intensive investigations and soon thereafter published his findings, showing that an electric current produces a circular magnetic field as it flows through a wire. For his discovery, the Royal Society of London awarded Ørsted the Copley Medal in 1820 and the French Academy granted him 3,000 francs.

Ørsted's findings stirred much research into electrodynamics throughout the scientific community, influencing French physicist André-Marie Ampère's developments of a single mathematical formula to represent the magnetic forces between current-carrying conductors. Ørsted's work also represented a major step toward a unified concept of energy.

The Ørsted effect brought about a communications revolution due to its application to the electric telegraph. The possibility of such a telegraph was suggested almost immediately by mathematician Pierre-Simon Laplace and Ampère presented a paper based on Laplace's idea the same year as Ørsted's discovery. However, it was almost two decades before it became a commercial reality.

== Later years ==
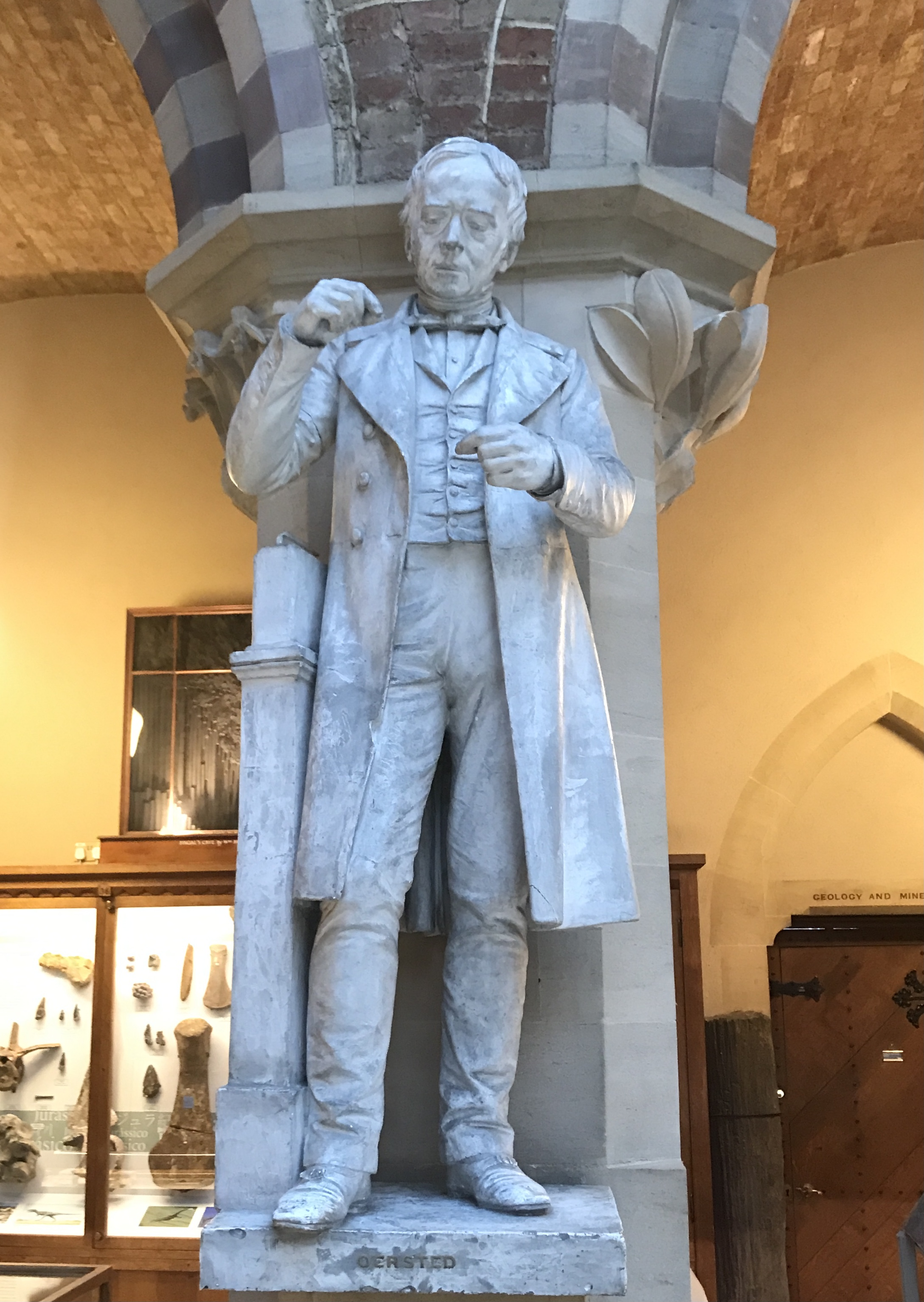
Statue of Ørsted at Oxford

Ørsted was elected a Fellow of the Royal Society of Edinburgh in March 1821, a Foreign Member of the Royal Society of London in April 1821, a foreign member of the Royal Swedish Academy of Sciences in 1822, a member of the American Philosophical Society in 1829, and a Foreign Honorary Member of the American Academy of Arts and Sciences in 1849.

In 1824, Ørsted founded the Society for the Dissemination of Natural Sciences (Selskabet for Naturlærens Udbredelse, or SNU). He was also the founder of other organizations which eventually became the Danish Meteorological Institute and the Danish Patent and Trademark Office. In 1829, Ørsted founded Den Polytekniske Læreanstalt (College of Advanced Technology), which was later renamed the Technical University of Denmark (DTU).

In 1824, Ørsted made a significant contribution to chemistry by being the first person to successfully produce aluminium in its metallic state, albeit in a less-than-pure form. In 1808, Humphry Davy had predicted the existence of the metal which he gave the name of alumium. However his attempts to isolate it using electrolysis processes were unsuccessful; the closest he came was an aluminium-iron alloy. Ørsted succeeded in isolating the metallic form by reacting aluminium chloride with potassium amalgam (an alloy of potassium and mercury) and then boiling away the mercury, which left small "chunks" of metal that he described as appearing similar to tin. (Note: This description, combined with others Ørsted gave subsequently, suggests that he had actually obtained an alloy of aluminium and potassium.) He presented his results and a sample of the metal at meetings of the Danish Academy of Sciences in early 1825, but otherwise appears to have considered his discovery to be of limited importance. This ambivalence, coupled with the limited audience for the Danish Academy's journal in which the results had been published, meant that the discovery went mostly unnoticed by the wider scientific community at the time. Busy with other work, in 1827 Ørsted gave his friend, the German chemist Friedrich Wöhler, permission to take over the research. Wöhler was able to produce approximately 30 grams (1.1 oz) of aluminium powder soon thereafter, using a process of his own design, before finally, in 1845, isolating a quantity of solid metal sufficient for him to describe some of its physical properties.

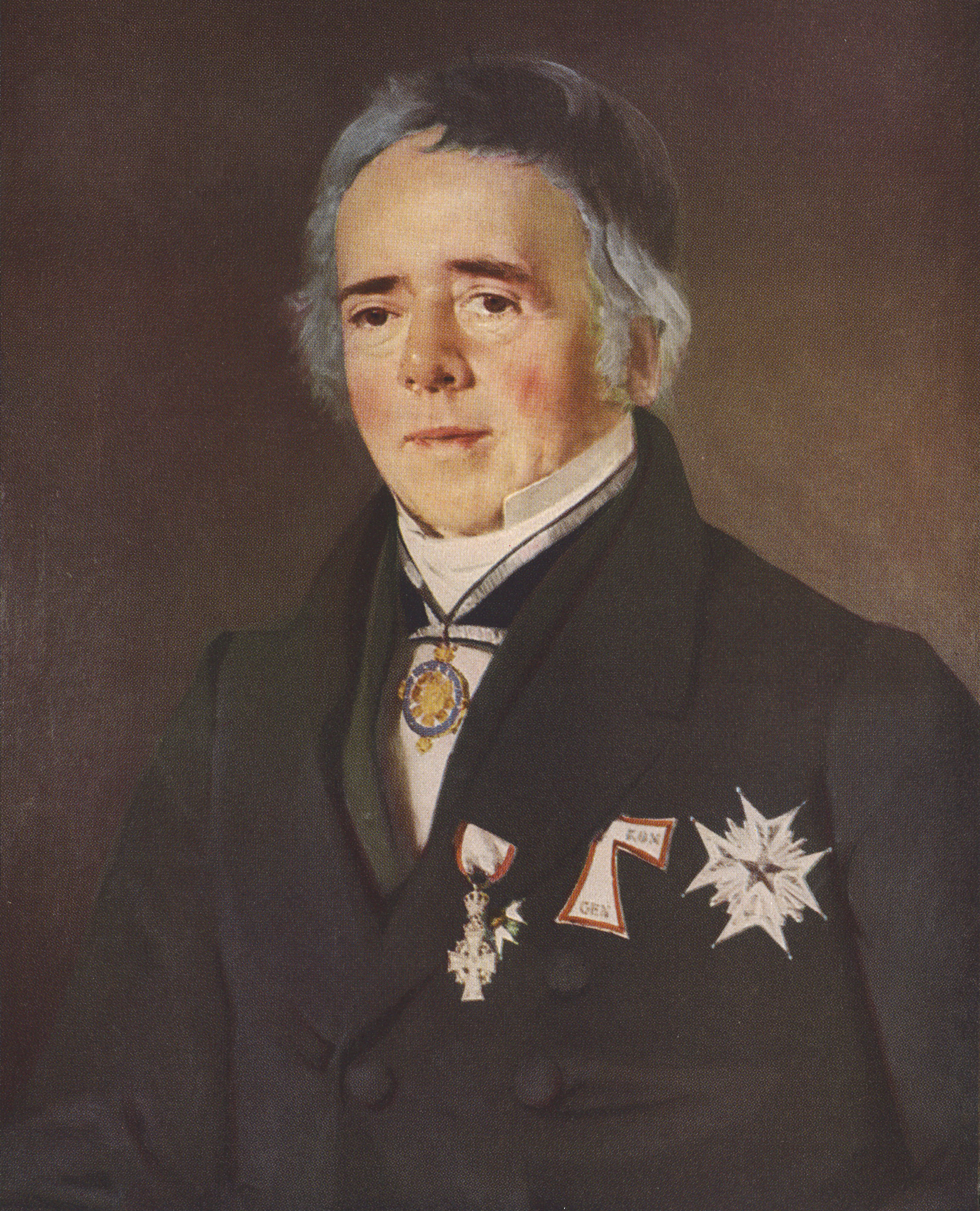
Portrait of Hans Christian Ørsted by Christian Albrecht Jensen (1842)

Ørsted died in Copenhagen in 1851, aged 73, and was buried there in the Assistens Cemetery.

== Legacy ==
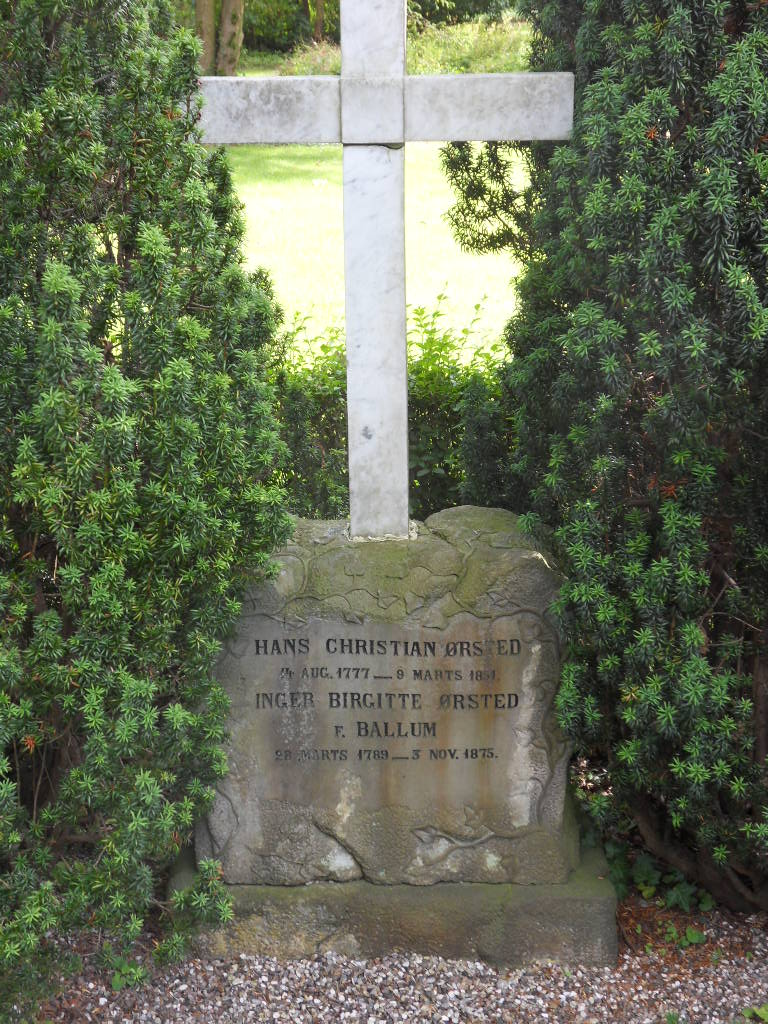
Gravestone

The centimetre-gram-second system (CGS) unit of magnetic induction (oersted) is named for his contributions to the field of electromagnetism.

The company Danish Oil and Natural Gas (DONG), was renamed Ørsted to signal its transition from fossil fuels to becoming one the world's leading developers and operators of offshore windfarms.

The protagonist of the 1994 role-playing video game Live A Live is named Oersted.

The first Danish satellite, launched in 1999, was named after Ørsted.

=== Toponymy ===
The Ørsted Park in Copenhagen was named after Ørsted and his brother in 1879. The streets H. C. Ørsteds Vej in Frederiksberg and H. C. Ørsteds Allé in Galten are also named after him.

The buildings that are home to the Department of Chemistry and the Institute for Mathematical Sciences at the University of Copenhagen's North Campus are named the H.C. Ørsted Institute, after him. A dormitory named H. C. Ørsted Kollegiet is located in Odense.

=== Monuments and memorials ===
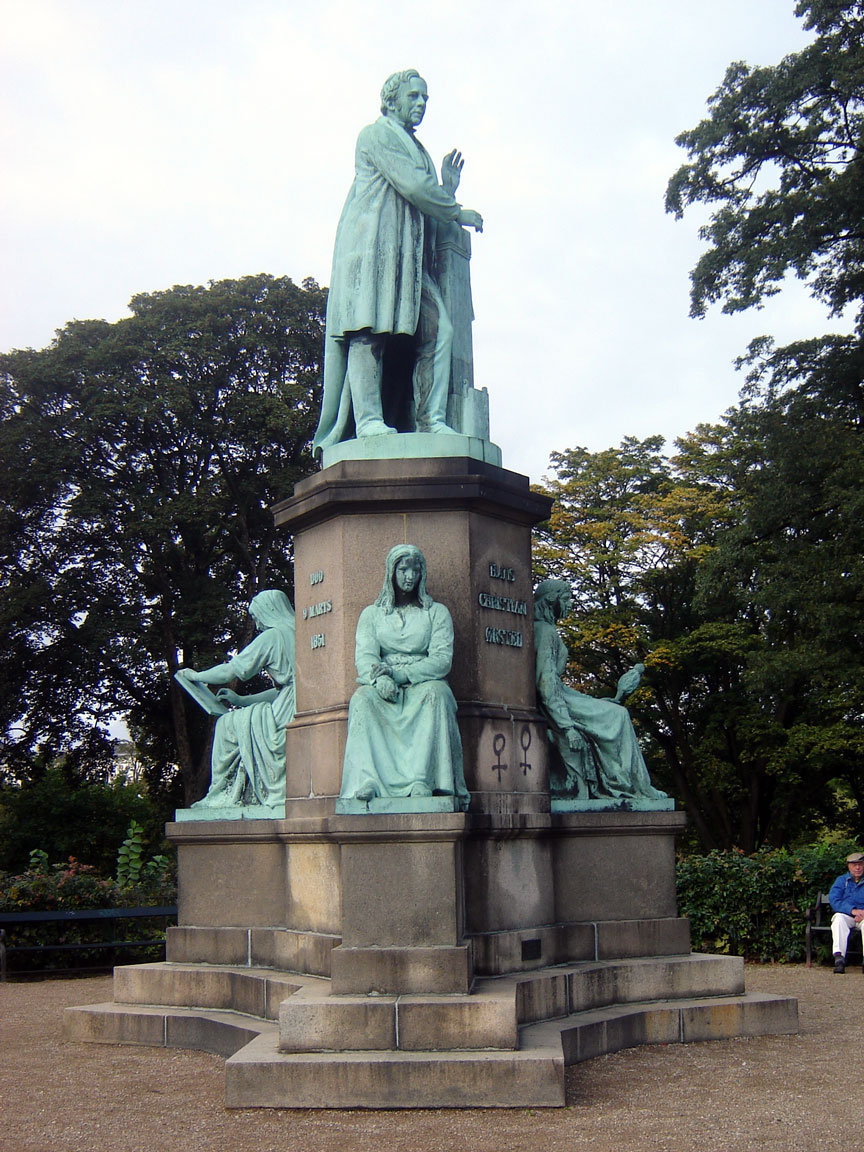
Statue of Ørsted in Ørstedsparken, in Copenhagen

A statue of Hans Christian Ørsted was installed in the Ørsted Park in 1880. A commemorative plaque is located above the gate on the building in Studiestræde where he lived and worked.

In 1885, a statue of Ørsted was installed in the Oxford University Museum of Natural History.

Ørsted's likeness has appeared twice on Danish banknotes; for the first time on 500 kroner notes issued in 1875, and for the second time on 100 kroner notes issued between 1962 and 1974.

=== Awards and lectures ===
Two medals are awarded in Ørsted's name: the H. C. Ørsted Medal for Danish scientists, awarded by the Danish Society for the Dissemination of Natural Science (SNU), as founded by Ørsted, and the Oersted Medal for notable contributions in the teaching of physics in America, awarded by American Association of Physics Teachers.

The Technical University of Denmark hosts the H. C. Ørsted Lecture series for prominent and engaging researchers from around the world.

== Works ==
Ørsted was a published poet, as well as scientist. His poetry series Luftskibet ("The Airship") was inspired by the balloon flights of fellow physicist and stage magician Étienne-Gaspard Robert.

- Ørsted, H. C. (1836). Luftskibet, et Digt [The Airship, a Poem] (in Danish). København: Gyldendal. OCLC 28930872.

In 1850, shortly before his death, he submitted for publication a two-volume collection of philosophical articles in German under the title Der Geist in der Natur ("The Soul in Nature"). It was translated into English and published in one volume in 1852, the year after his death.

- Ørsted, H. C. (1850–1851). Der Geist in der Natur [The Soul in Nature] (in German). München: J. G. Cotta. OCLC 653954.
  - —— (1852). The Soul in Nature, with Supplementary Contributions. Bohn's scientific library [16]. Translated by Horner, L.; Horner, J. B. London: Henry G. Bohn. hdl:2027/loc.ark:/13960/t4zg7w20q. OCLC 8719272.

Other works:

- Ørsted, H. C. (1807). "Betragtninger over Chemiens Historie" [Considerations on the History of Chemistry]. Det Skandinaviske Litteraturselskabs Skrifter (in Danish). 2. København: Andreas Seidelin: 1–54. OCLC 872505637.
- —— (1809). Videnskaben om Naturens almindelige Love [The Science of the General Laws of Nature] (in Danish). København: Fr. Brummer. OCLC 488860438.
- —— (1812). Ansicht der chemischen Naturgesetze, durch die neuern Entdeckungen gewonnen [View of the Chemical Laws of Nature Gained Through Recent Discoveries] (in German). Berlin: Realschulbuchhandlung. OCLC 28640794.
- —— (1814). Imod den store Anklager [Against the Great Accuser] (in Danish). København: Andreas Seidelin. OCLC 19092207.
- —— (1820). "Experiments on the Effect of a Current of Electricity on the Magnetic Needle". In Thomson, T. (ed.). Annals of Philosophy; or, Magazine of Chemistry, Mineralogy, Mechanics, Natural History, Agriculture, and the Arts. Vol. XVI. London: Baldwin, Cradock, and Joy. pp. 273–276. hdl:2027/osu.32435051156651. OCLC 9529852.
- —— (1844). Naturlærens mechaniske Deel [The Mechanical Part of Natural Learning] (in Danish). København: C. A. Reitzel. hdl:2027/njp.32101058433184. OCLC 22224906.
- —— (1851). Der mechanische Theil der Naturlehre [The Mechanical Part of Natural Learning] (in German). Braunschweig: Friedrich Vieweg und Sohn. OCLC 9489733. OL 6960604M.
- Harding, M. C., ed. (1920). Correspondance de H. C. Örsted avec divers savants [The Correspondence of H. C. Örsted with Various Scholars]. Copenhaugue: H. Aschehoug & Co. OCLC 11070734.
  - Volume I, containing correspondence with Jöns Jacob Berzelius, Christopher Hansteen, and Christian Samuel Weiss.
  - Volume II, containing correspondence with Johann Wilhelm Ritter and numerous others, including Michael Faraday and Carl Friedrich Gauss.

A significant number of Ørsted's papers were made available in English for the first time in a compilation published in 1998:

- Ørsted, H. C. (1998). Jelved, K.; Jackson, A. D.; Knudsen, O. (eds.). Selected Scientific Works of Hans Christian Ørsted. Princeton University Press. ISBN 978-0-69104-334-0. JSTOR j.ctt7zvhx2. OCLC 36393437.

== See also ==
- History of aluminium
- James Clerk Maxwell
- Michael Faraday
- Gian Domenico Romagnosi, who also observed an electrostatic attraction of a compass needle.
