= 3Shape =

Developer and manufacturer of 3D scanners

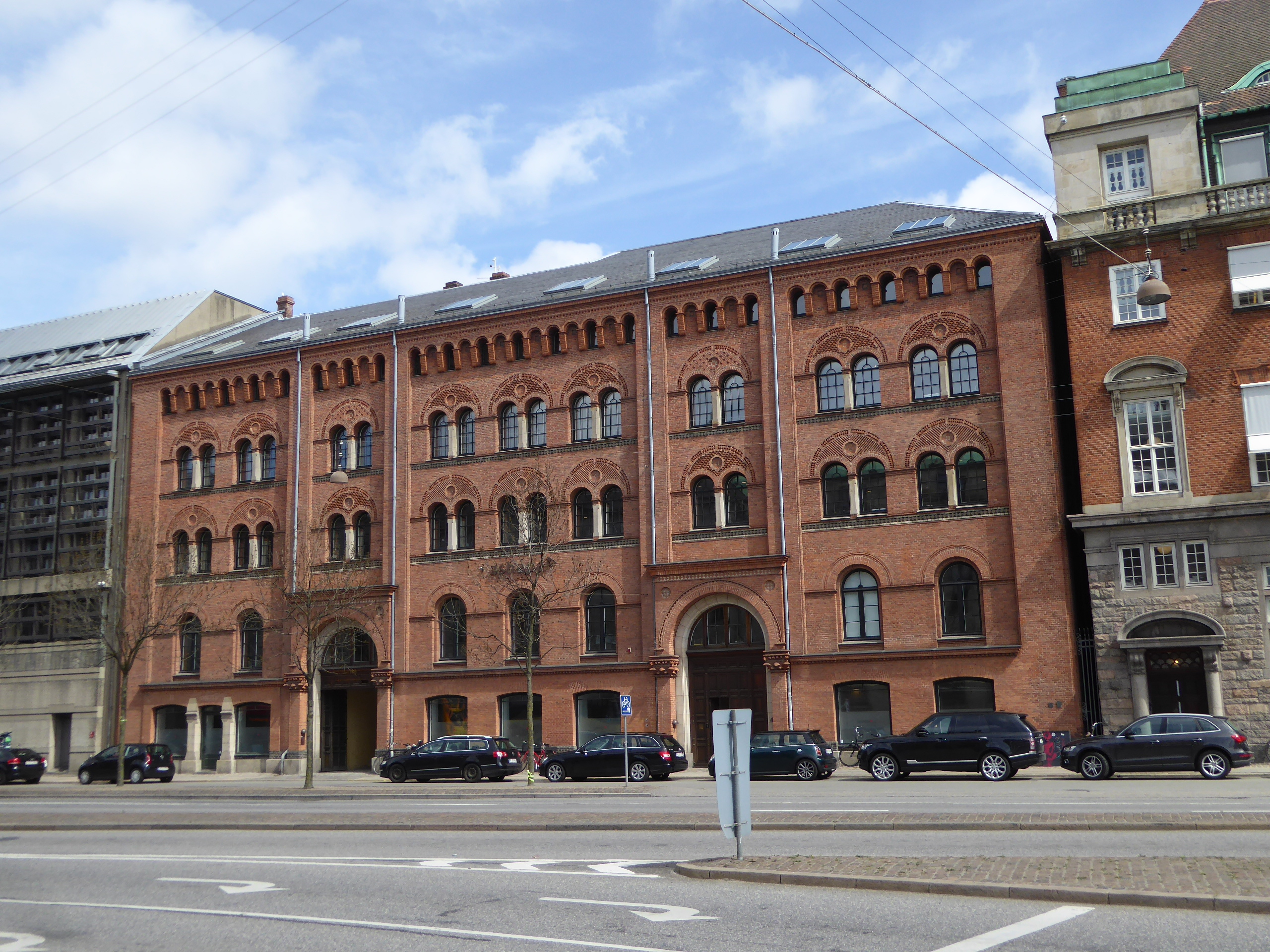
- 3Shape Management HQ in Copenhagen.
- Company type: Private limited company
- Industry: 3D scanners and CAD/CAM software
- Founded: 2000
- Founder: Tais Clausen and Nikolaj Deichmann
- Headquarters: Copenhagen, Denmark
- Key people: Tais Clausen/Nikolaj Deichmann(CEO), Nikolaj Hoffmann Deichmann(Chairman)
- Number of employees: 2000+ (2022)

3Shape is a developer and manufacturer of 3D scanners and CAD/CAM software for the dental and audio industries based in Copenhagen, Denmark. The company has production facilities and offices in China, Europe, Latin America and the USA.

== History ==
The underlying technology was developed by Tais Clausen in connection with his master thesis at Technical University of Denmark. He teamed up with Copenhagen Business School graduate student Nikolaj Deichmann, founding the company in 2000. The company has been named “Entrepreneur of the Year” by Ernst & Young three times. Flemming Thorup was CEO of the company from 2002 to 2017.

3Shape has been the recipient of the Cellerant Best in Class award for 2015, 2016, and 2017.
