= Co-Ro Food =

Danish soft drink manufacturer

- Type: Private
- Industry: Beverages
- Founded: 1942
- Founder: Flemming and Jep Petersen
- Headquarters: Frederikssund, Denmark
- Key people: Michael Ring, Chairman(CEO, chairman), Ole Jørgensen(Chairman)
- Revenue: DKK 1.6 billion (2012)
- Number of employees: 700 (2012)
- Website: co-ro.com

CO-RO is a manufacturer of fruit-based uncarbonated soft drinks based in Frederikssund, Denmark. The company was founded by the brothers Flemming and Jep Petersen in 1942. It has production in 11 countries and had revenues of DKK 1.65 billion in 2012.

== Products ==
- Sunquick
- Suntop
- Suncola
- Sun Lolly
- Sunjoy
- Mash Up
