= Jens Adolf Jerichau =

Danish sculptor (1816–1883)

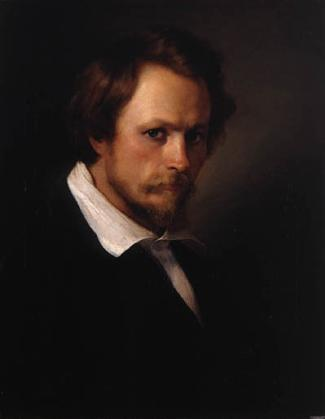
- Jens Adolf Jerichau by his wife Elisabeth Jerichau-Baumann
- Born: 17 April 1816; Assens, Denmark
- Died: 25 July 1883 (aged 67); Copenhagen, Denmark
- Resting place: Solbjerg Park Cemetery
- Education: Royal Danish Academy of Fine Arts
- Known for: Sculptor
- Notable work: Hans Christian Ørsted Monument (1876)
- Movement: Neoclassicism (early works); Naturalism (later works)
- Awards: Thorvaldsen Medal (1847)

Emil Jens Baumann Adolf Jerichau (17 April 1816 – 25 July 1883) was a Danish sculptor. He belonged to the generation immediately after Bertel Thorvaldsen, for whom he worked briefly in Rome, but gradually moved away from the static Neoclassicism he inherited from him and towards a more dynamic and realistic style. He was a professor at the Royal Danish Academy of Fine Arts and its director from 1857 to 1863.

== Early life and career ==
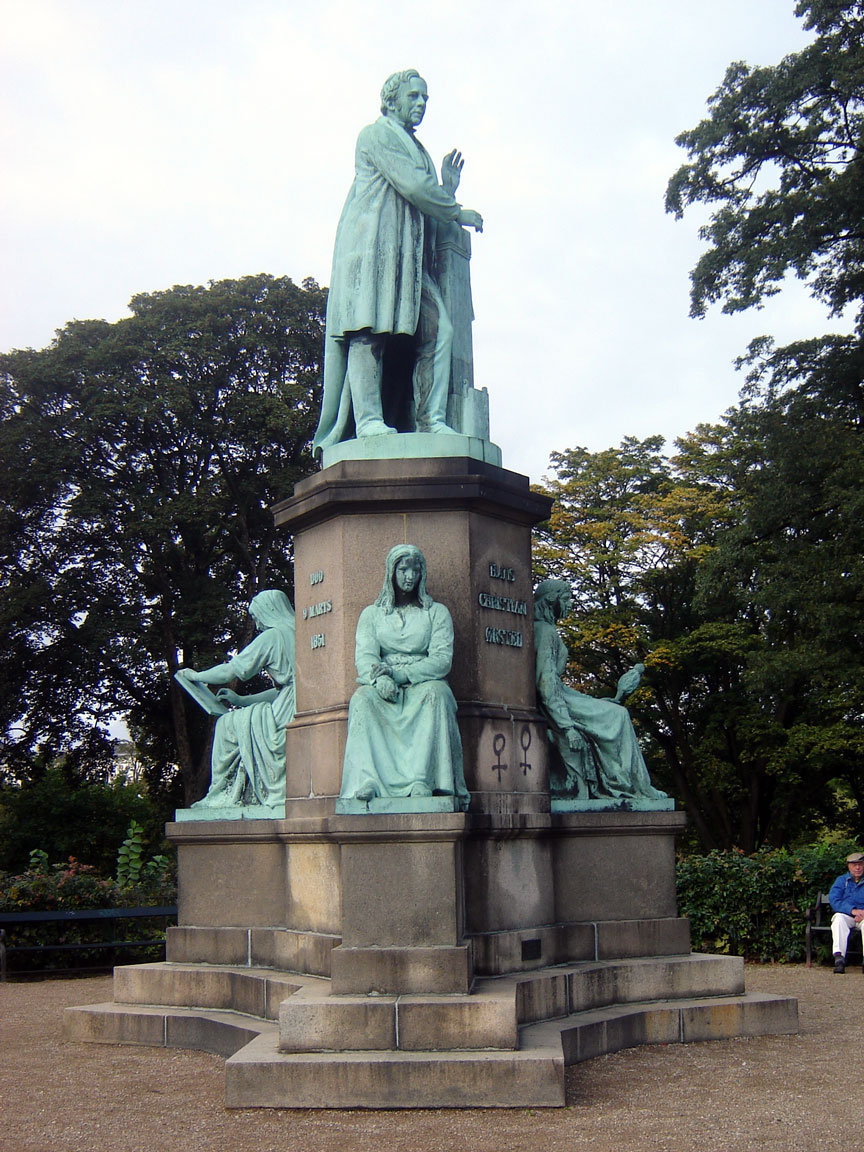
Hans Christian Ørsted Monument at Ørstedsparken in Copenhagen

Jens Adolf Jerichau was born in Assens on the Danish island of Funen to grocer and lieutenant Carl Christian Jerichau and his wife Karen Birch. He worked in a painter's apprenticeship for one and a half years before traveling to Copenhagen where he was admitted to the Royal Academy of Fine Arts in 1831. He was accepted into the model school in 1833 and continued to the painting school, at the same time studying privately with painter Christoffer Wilhelm Eckersberg after winning both silver medals. Then in 1836 he started sculpting with German-born sculptor Hermann Ernst Freund.

== Years in Rome ==
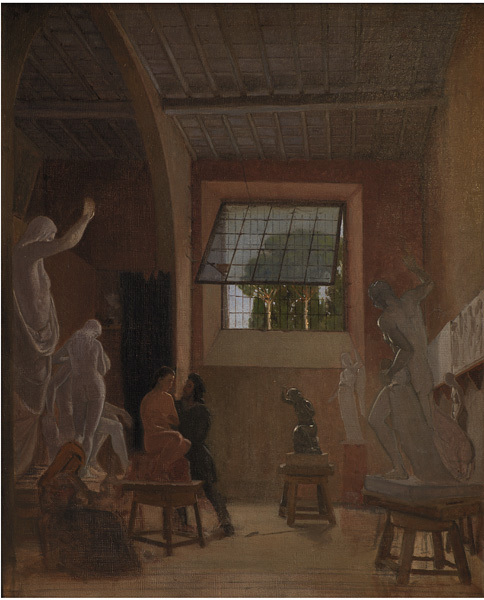
Jerichau in his studio in Rome

After graduating from the Academy in 1837, Jerichau traveled to Rome where he initially worked for around a year in Bertel Thorvaldsen's studio. His early works such as the sculpture Hercules and Hebe (1846, original model in the Ny Carlsberg Glyptotek) as well as his colossal Christ figure from 1849 are in a strong Neoclassical style which bear clear testament to Thorvaldsen. He established his calling through a bas-relief on a frieze in the royal palace Christiansborg in Copenhagen, depicting the marriage of Alexander the Great to Roxane. Completed in 1864, it was later burned as were a number of his most famous works which were damaged or ruined in a fire in the Christiansborg Palace in 1884.

== Finding his own style ==
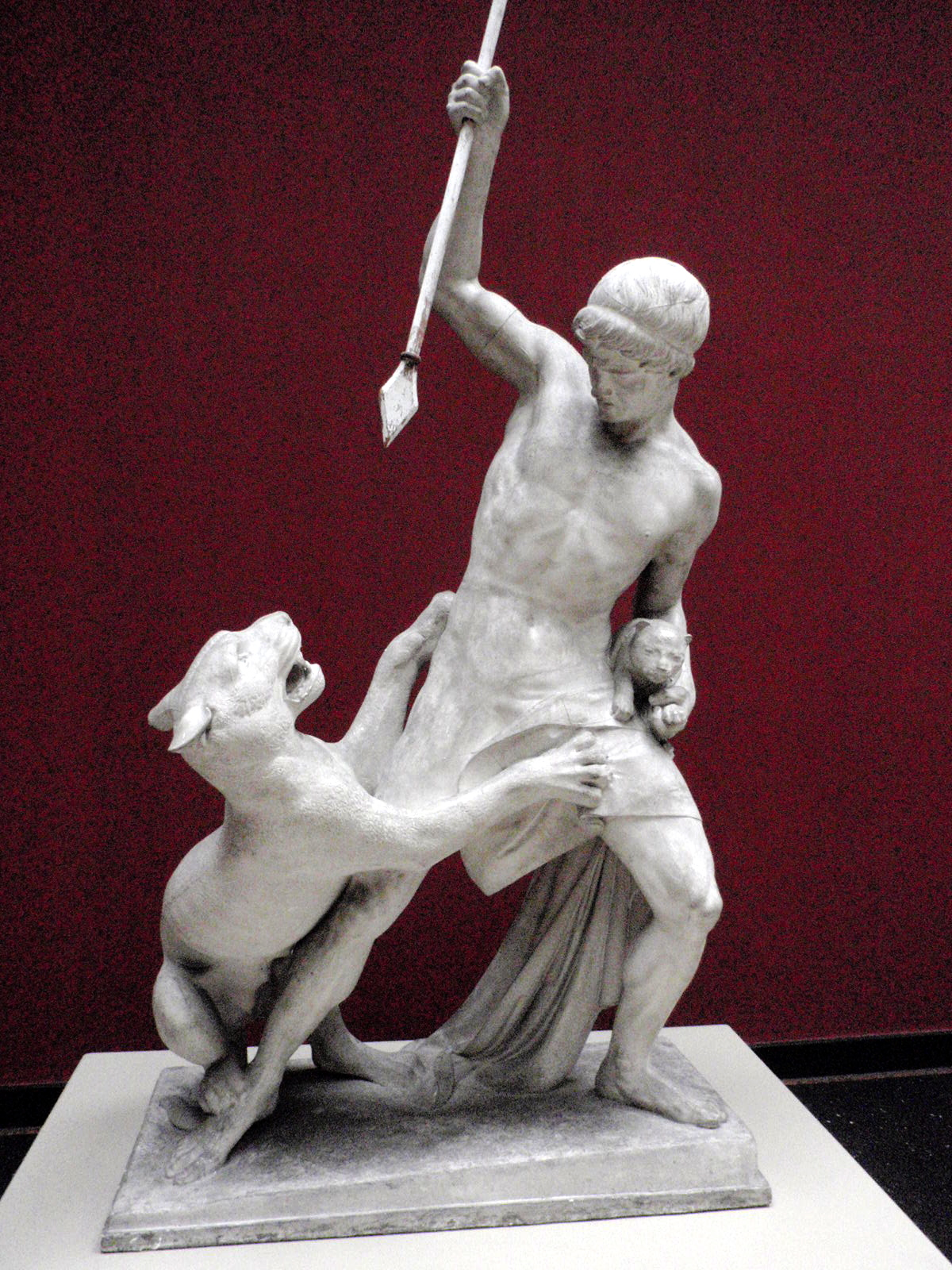
The Panther Hunter (1846)

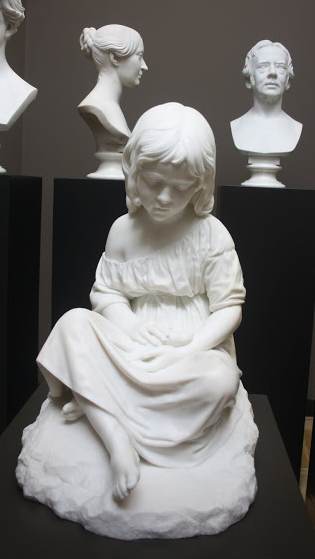
Little Girl with a Dead Bird (1871), a sculpture in marble at Ny Carlsberg Glyptotek, Copenhagen

With his sculpture group Penelope (1845–46, Danish National Gallery), which won international acclaim, he moved away from the static Neoclassicism and towards a more dramatic and dynamic style. He created also formed depictions of nature, such as The Panther Hunter (1846, Danish National Gallery).

Among his more notable works would be Hans Christian Ørsted Monument dedicated to physicist Hans Christian Ørsted. The monument was cast in bronze on a base of granite. At the foot of the statue sit the three Norns of Norse mythology; Urðr (the past), Verðandi (the present) and Skuld (the future). Situated at Ørstedsparken in central Copenhagen, the monument was inaugurated in 1876.

== Family ==
Jerichau married the painter Elisabeth Jerichau-Baumann and they had 9 children. They were the parents of composer Thorald Jerichau, and landscape artists Harald Jerichau and Holger H. Jerichau.

Jens Adolf Jerichau died in Copenhagen and was buried at Solbjerg Park Cemetery.

== Selected works ==
- Adam and Eve before the Fall (1863) Ny Carlsberg Glyptotek, Copenhagen
- Standing Goat (1845) Danish National Gallery, Copenhagen
- Bathing Girls (1862) Danish National Gallery, Copenhagen
- Sleeping Reaper (1852) Ny Carlsberg Glyptotek, Copenhagen
- Little Girl with a Dead Bird (1871) Ny Carlsberg Glyptotek, Copenhagen
- The Panther Hunter (1846) Danish National Gallery, Copenhagen
- Slave Girl (1860) Danish National Gallery, Copenhagen

=== Public art ===
- H. C. Ørsted Memorial (1871) at Ørsted Park in Copenhagen
- Crucifix (1854) Jesus Church, Valby, Copenhagen
- King David (1860) Church of Our Lady, Copenhagen

== See also ==
- Art of Denmark

== Bibliography ==
- Nicolaj Bøgh, Erindringer af og om Jens Adolf Jerichau (1884).

Cultural offices
Preceded by Wilhelm Marstrand	Director of the Royal Danish Academy of Fine Arts; 1857–1863	Succeeded by Wilhelm Marstrand
