= Kemp & Lauritzen =

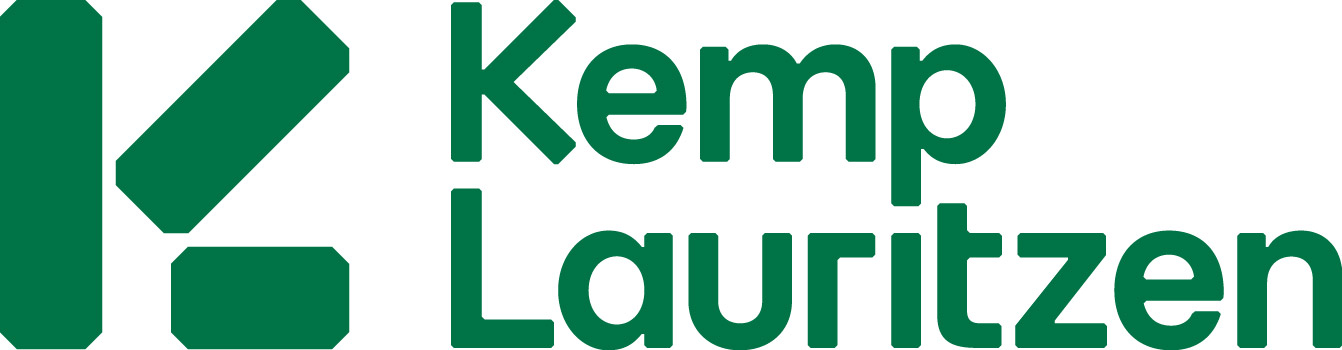
- Company type: Private limited company
- Industry: Technical engineering
- Founded: 1882
- Founder: Otto Kemp, Severin Lauritzen
- Headquarters: Albertslund, Copenhagen, Denmark
- Key people: Peter Kaas Hammer (CEO), Karsten Riis Andersen (CFO)
- Revenue: DKK 4,752 million (2024)
- Net income: DKK 188 million
- Number of employees: 3,000 (2025)
- Website: www.kemp-lauritzen.dk

Kemp & Lauritzen is a technical engineering company based in Copenhagen, Denmark. The company has 3000 employees across the country.

Since the 1900s the company has deliviered all-inclusive solutions within electrical, HVAC, cooling and ventilation to over 9,000 public and private customers, focusing on the green transition and digital solutions.

== History ==
The company was founded on 16 December 1882 by Otto Niels Kemp (1845–1905) and Severin Lauritzen (1850–1924). In 1954, the privately held company was converted into a limited company. In 1982, Axel Muusfeldt, the CEO and main shareholder of the company, set up a new foundation, Axel Muusfeldts Fond, which received his shares in the company at the event of his death in 1989. As of 2025, Axel Muusfeldts Fond owns 100% of the company.
