= List of public art in Copenhagen Botanical Garden =

This is a list of public art in University of Copenhagen Botanical Garden in Copenhagen, Denmark.

Image	Title / individual commemorated	Sculptor	Created	Installed	Source
	Artemis; Artemis	Unknown	4th century		source
	Diana of Versailles; Artemis med hinden	Praxiteles	4th century		
	Lemnian Athena	Phidias	C.440 bc	1912	
	Athena and Marsyas	Myron			
	Discobolus	Myron	5th century bc		
	Narcissus	Artist unknown	5th century bc		
	Hermes Fastening his Sandal	Lysippos	4th century bc		
	Wounded Amazon	Theobald Stein	C. 430 bc		
	Tubal-cain	Vilhelm Bissen	1881	1892	
	Tycho Brahe	Herman Wilhelm Bissen		1886	

== See also ==
- List of public art in Rosenborg Castle Gardens
