= Scan Group =

- Company type: Private limited company
- Industry: Shipping
- Founded: 1969
- Founder: Arne Simonsen
- Headquarters: Copenhagen, Denmark
- Key people: Arne Simonsen (CEO)
- Revenue: DKK 6,7312 million (2012)
- Net income: DKK 90 million (2012)
- Number of employees: 2,410 (2013))
- Website: scan-group.com

Scan Group is a shipping and logistics company based in Copenhagen, Denmark.

== History ==
The company was founded as Scan-Shipping by Arne Simonsen on 1 April 1969. Scan-Shipping Airfreight was established in 1978. The first office outside Denmark opened 1973 in New York (since 1988 Shipco Transport Inc.). The name was changed to Scan Group in 2010.

== Location ==
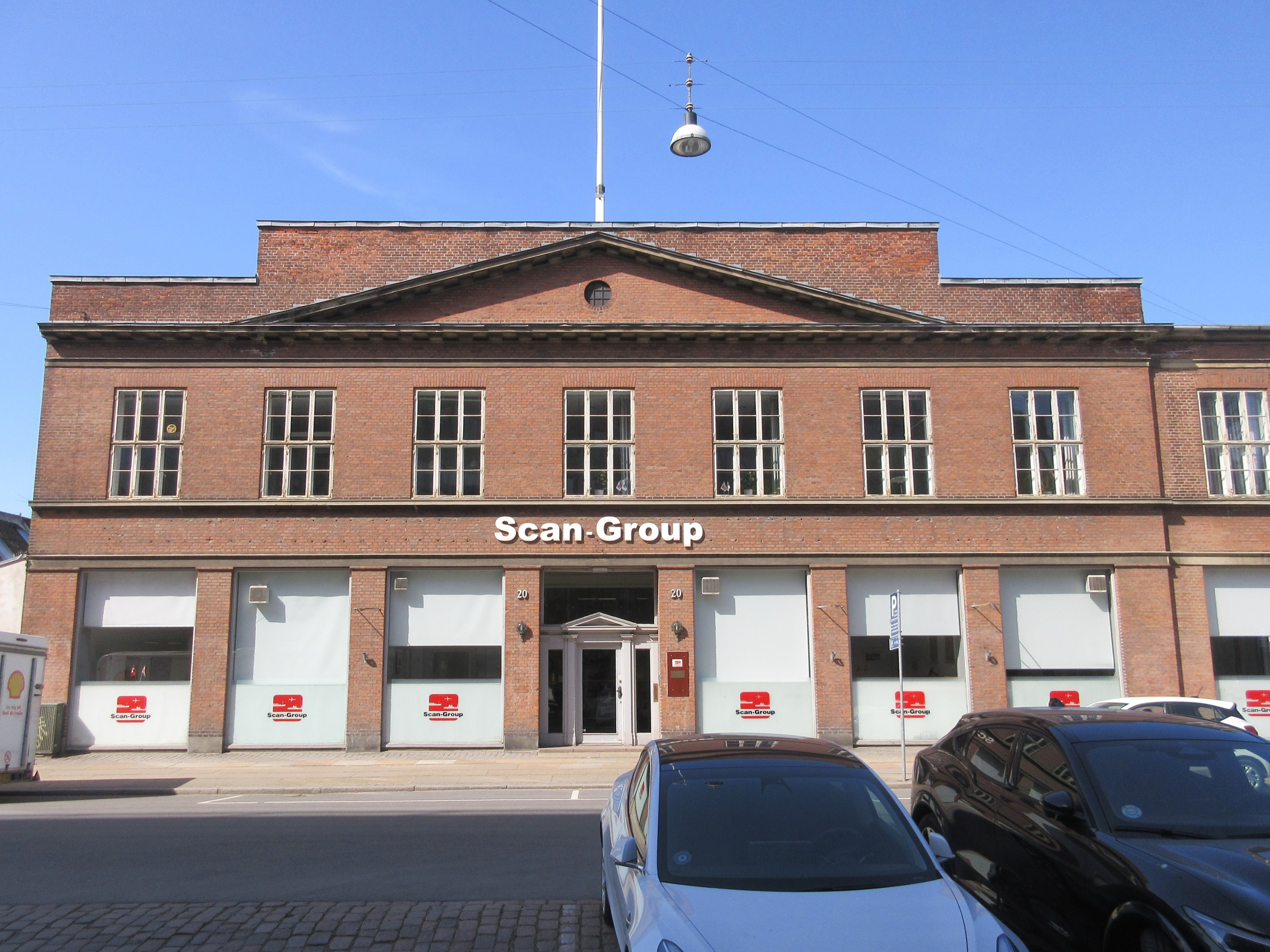
Scan Group headquarters uin 2024.

The company is headquartered at Snorresgade 18–20 in the Islands Brygge district of central Copenhagen. The building is the former home of International Harbester's Danish subsidiary.
