= Albertslund Municipality =

Albertslund Municipality Albertslund Kommune (Danish)
- Municipality
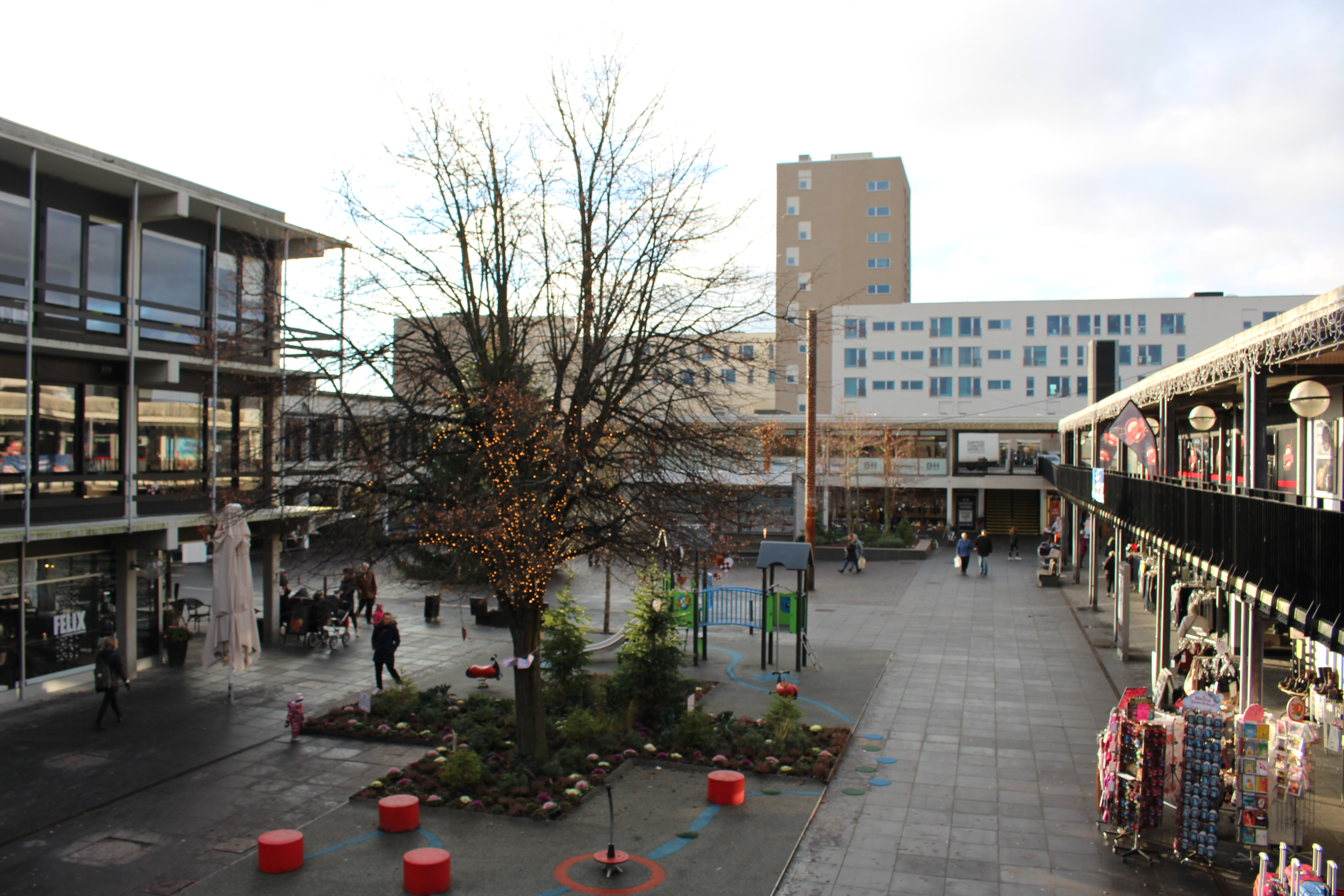

- Coat of arms

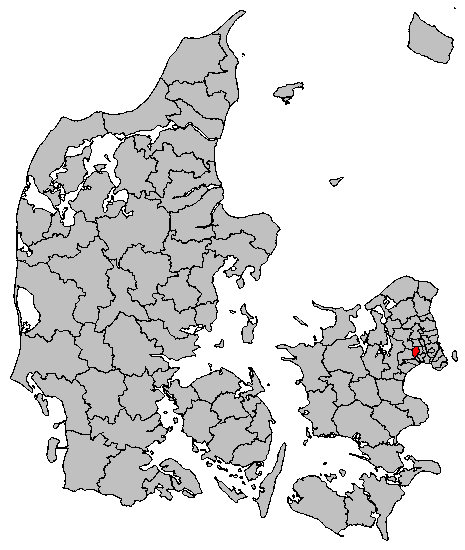
- Coordinates: 55°39′N 12°21′E
- Country: Denmark
- Region: Hovedstaden
- Established: 1 January 1842
- Seat: Albertslund

Government
  - Mayor: Lars Gravgaard Hansen (C)

Area
  - Total: 23.04 km^{2} (8.90 sq mi)

Population (1 January 2026)
  - Total: 29,262
  - Density: 1,270/km^{2} (3,289/sq mi)
- Time zone: UTC+1 (CET)
  - Summer (DST): UTC+2 (CEST)
- Postal code: 2620
- Municipal code: 165
- Website: albertslund.dk

Albertslund Municipality (Danish: Albertslund Kommune) is a municipality in Region Hovedstaden on the island of Zealand in eastern Denmark. The municipality covers an area of 23.04 km^{2}, and has a population of 29,262 (1 January 2026). Its mayor is Lars Gravgaard Hansen, a member of the Conservative People's Party (DeKonservative) political party.

The main town and the site of its municipal council is the town of Albertslund. The original name of the municipality was Herstedernes Kommune. In 1973 the name was changed to Albertslund Kommune. The name Herstederne represents the two communities of Herstedvester and Herstedøster which were the original villages in the area together with Vridsløse and Risby.

Neighboring municipalities are Glostrup to the east, Ballerup and Egedal municipality to the north, Høje-Taastrup to the west, and Vallensbæk and Brøndby to the south.

Albertslund is home to Danmarks International Kollegium, which has won many awards for its design.

Albertslund is also known for its effort in raising awareness about climate change.

Albertslund Municipality was not merged with other municipalities by 1 January 2007 as the result of nationwide 2007 Municipal Reform.

In 1973 Friluftsbadet Badesøen opened for the first time in Albertslund.

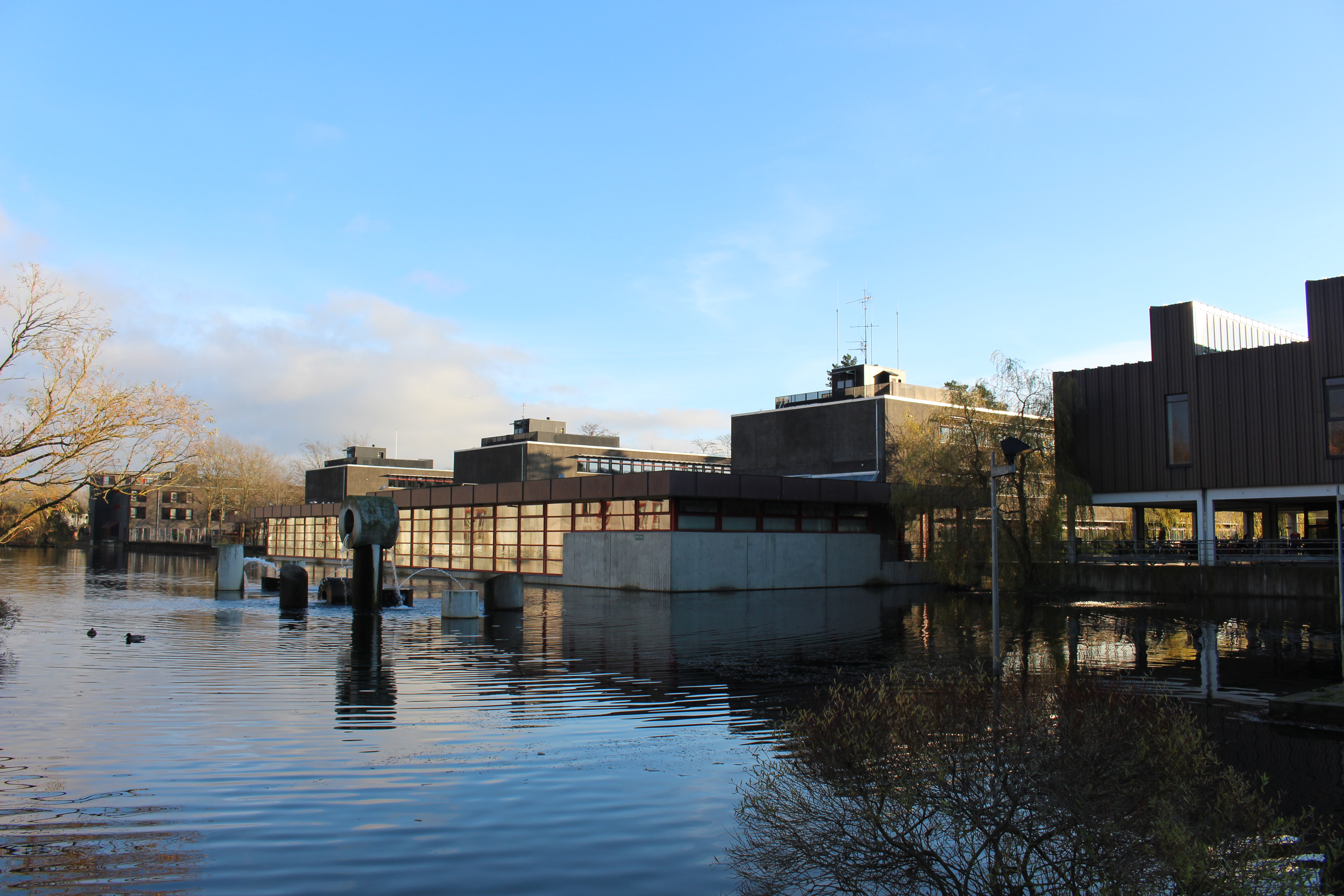
Albertslund Town Hall

== Economy ==
Companies headquartered in the municipality include FDB (Coop Danmark) and Kemp & Lauritzen.

== Politics ==
=== Municipal council ===
Albertslund's municipal council consists of 21 members, elected every four years.

Below are the municipal councils elected since the Municipal Reform of 2007.

Election	Party										Total seats	Turnout	Elected mayor
Election	A	B	C	F	I	L	O	V	Ø	Å	Total seats	Turnout	Elected mayor
2005	11		2	3			2	1	2		21	65.8%	Finn Aaberg (A)
2009	9		2	6			2	1	1		21	60.6%	Steen Christiansen (A)
2013	9	1	1	2			3	2	3		21	66.9%	Steen Christiansen (A)
2017	9	1	2	2			3	1	2	1	21	66.1%	Steen Christiansen (A)
2021	7	2	4	4			1	1	2		21	63.3%	Steen Christiansen (A)
2025	6	2	2	5	1	1	2		2		21	62.3%	Lars Gravgaard Hansen (C)
Data from Kmdvalg.dk 2005, 2009, 2013, 2017 and 2021. Data from valg.dk 2025

== Twin towns – sister cities ==
Albertslund is twinned with:

- Borken, Germany
- Dainville, France
- East Renfrewshire, Scotland, United Kingdom
- Grabow, Germany
- Mölndal, Sweden
- Říčany, Czech Republic
- Whitstable, England, United Kingdom

== Friluftsbadet Badesøen ==
Friluftsbadet Badesøen (Open-Air Swimming Lake; 55.6755°N 12.3338°E) is a swimming pool in Albertslund Municipality.

Badesøen's distinctive, round pool is 60 m in diameter. It has a water surface of 2800 m^{2} and contains 3.6 million gallons of water. Water depth varies from 25 cm along the edge to 380 cm during the 1 and 3 meter lashes. In the children's departments is the water depth from 25 to 80 cm deep. The basin is divided into areas for small children, for children who cannot swim, and for swimmers. There is in the large area are two bathing bridges, between which there are a number of 50-meter lanes. Badesøen's two waterslides are respectively 60 and 43 meters long. The water temperature at approximately 22 degrees is powered by solar energy.

The whole area is 5000 m^{2} and includes a beach volleyball court, beach, ball field, streetbasket field, children's area, café area, boccia court, locker facilities and large grassed areas. On a warm summer days Badesøen visited 3,000 customers. Badesøen first opened in 1973.

== See also ==
- Herstedvester Church
- Herstedøster Church
