= Holger H. Jerichau =

Danish painter (1861–1900)

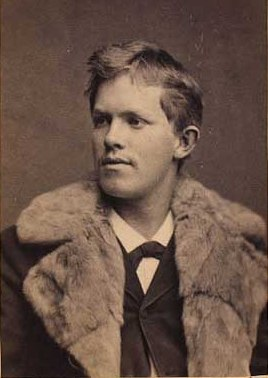
Holger H. Jerichau; by Hansen, Schou & Weller

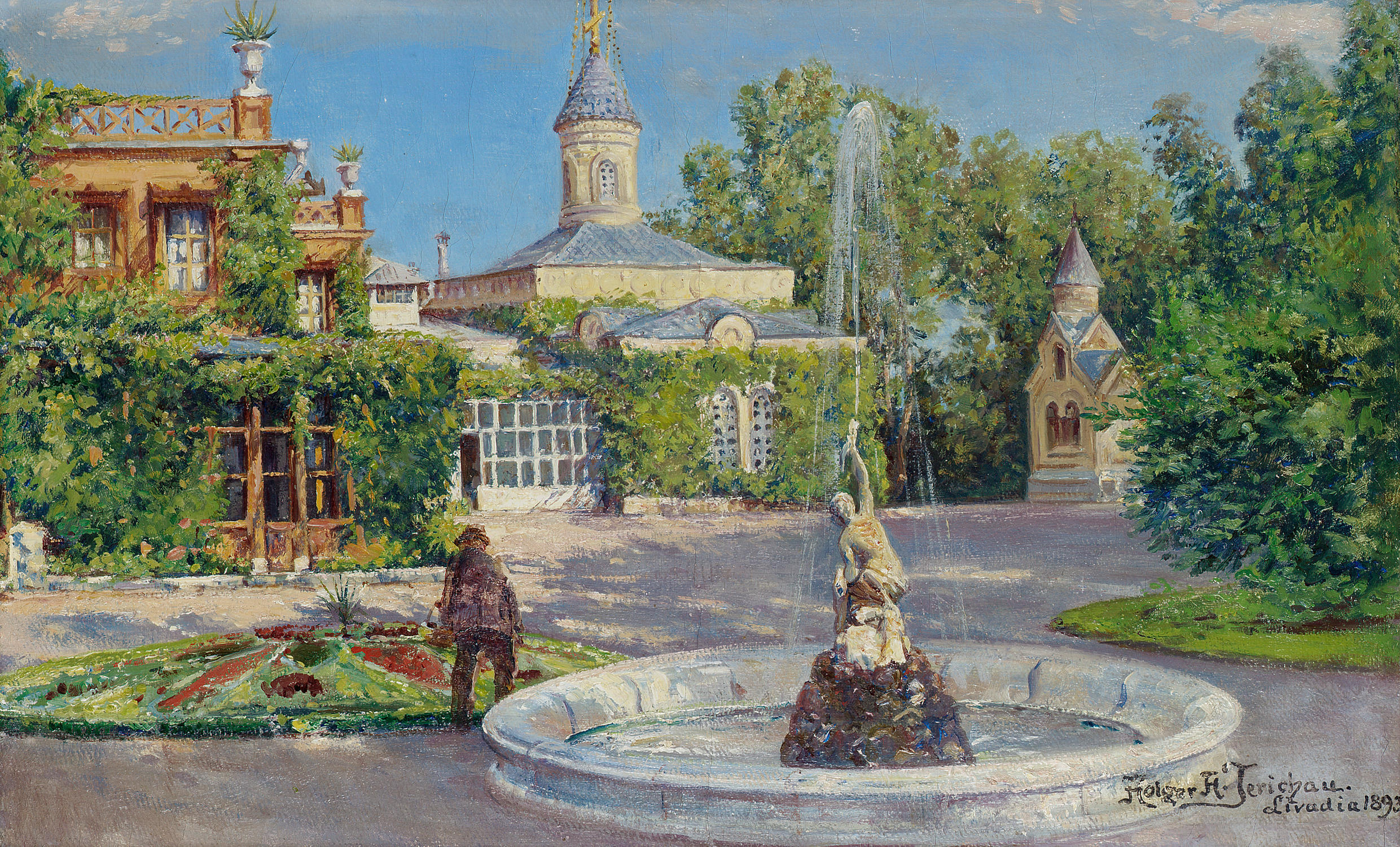
View of Livadia Palace

Holger Hvidtfeldt Jerichau (29 April 1861, Copenhagen – 25 December 1900, Copenhagen) was a Danish landscape painter. His brother, Harald Jerichau, was also a well known painter in the same genre.

== Life and work ==
He was born to the sculptor, Jens Adolf Jerichau, and his wife, Elisabeth Jerichau Baumann, who was a painter. He was initially apprenticed to the merchant trade in Germany and Italy, but displayed little aptitude for that career. As a result, he chose to follow in the footsteps of his parents. He received most of his training from his mother, but also studied with tutors abroad. He never attended an art school.

Beginning in 1884, he exhibited landscapes with Italian motifs. He lived abroad for most of his life; primarily in Italy, but also in southern Russia and Asia, including a year in India (1893–94). Most of his Danish landscapes are from 1885 and 1886, when he lived near Hørsholm and married Anna Frederikke Birch, daughter of the local registrar. Their son, Jens Adolf, a promising Expressionist painter, committed suicide at the age of twenty-five.

Much of his work is now rated as superficial, and obviously aimed at the tastes of the widest possible audience. Despite the cultural diversity of the places where he lived and visited, his choice of subjects is often banal and the colors very simple.

He died on Christmas in 1900, and is buried at the Hørsholm Cemetery. Although only thirty-nine, his overall output was considerable.

== Sources ==
- J.B.H., "Holger H. Jerichau", In: Merete Bodelsen and Povl Engelstoft (Eds.), Weilbachs Kunstnerleksikon, Copenhagen, Aschehoug (1947–52)
- Gunnar Carlquist (Ed.), Svensk uppslagsbok, Vol.14, 1933, pg.408
