= List of public art in Rosenborg Castle Gardens =

This is a list of public art in Rosenborg Castle Gardens in Copenhagen, Denmark.

Image	Title / individual commemorated	Sculptor	Created	Installed	Source
	Echo; Ekko	Aksel Hansen		1888	source
	Dowager Queen Caroline Amalie	Vilhelm Bissen		1896	Source
	Hans Christian Andersen	August Saabye		1880	Source
	Hercules	Giovanni Baratta		?	
	Group of Deer; Hjortegruppe	Arthur le Duc		1910	Source
	Hørup Monument	Jens Ferdinand Willumsen		1908	
	A Moment of Peril; Kamp med en slange (eng: Battle with a snake)	Thomas Brock		1880	Source
	Little Gunver; Liden Gunver	Theobald Stein	1899	1909	Source
	The Lion and the Horse; Løven og hesten	Peter Husum	1617	c. 1643	
	Marble balls	Unknown		17th century	Source
	Ring riding columns	Unknown		16th-17th century	Source
	Two Resting Lions; To Hvilende Løver	Unknown		Pre-1673	Source

== See also ==
- List of public art in Ørstedsparken
