= Sigurd Müller =

Sigurd Müller may refer to:

- Sigurd Müller (writer) (1844–1918), Danish writer
- Sigurd Müller (police chief) (1924–2011), Norwegian police chief
- Sigurd Müller (wine trader) (1904–1997), Danish wine trader
