= Elisabeth Jerichau-Baumann =

Polish-Danish painter (1819–1881)

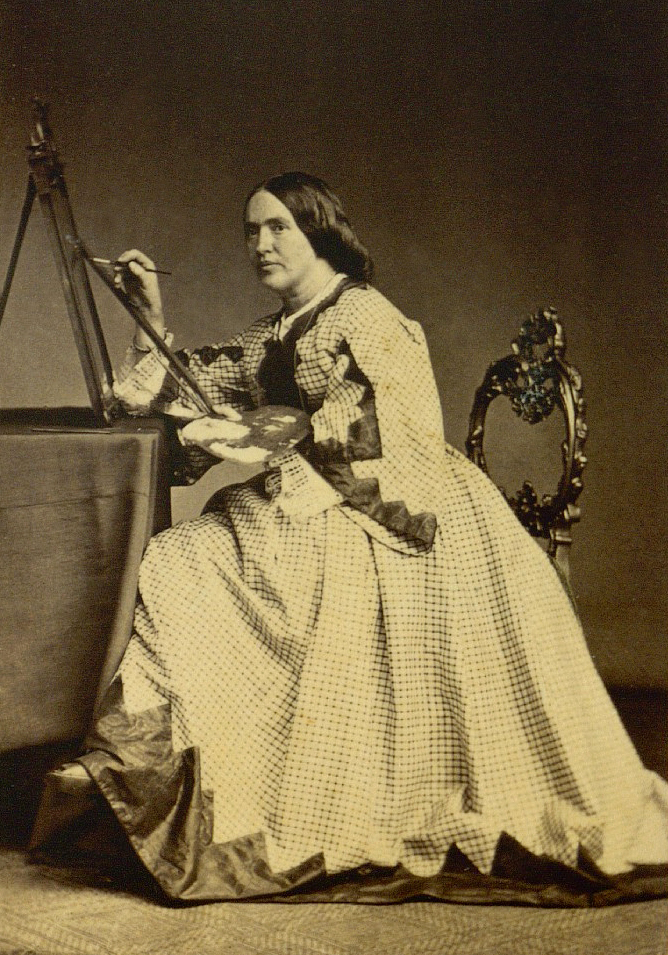
- Photograph by Rudolph Striegler, c. 1870
- Born: Anna Maria Elisabeth Lisinska Baumann; 21 November 1819; Warsaw, Congress Poland
- Died: 11 July 1881 (aged 61); Copenhagen, Denmark
- Education: Düsseldorf/Rome
- Known for: Painting
- Notable work: Mermaid
- Patrons: Queen Louise of Denmark

Anna Maria Elisabeth Lisinska Jerichau-Baumann (21 November 1819 – 11 July 1881) was a Polish-Danish painter. She was married to the sculptor Jens Adolf Jerichau.

== Early life and career ==
Elisabeth Jerichau-Baumann was born in Żoliborz (French: Joli Bord) a borough of Warsaw. Her father Philip Adolph Baumann (1776–1863), a mapmaker, and her mother, Johanne Frederikke Reyer (1790–1854), were of German extraction.

At the age of nineteen, she began her studies at the Kunstakademie Düsseldorf, which at the time was one of the most important art centres in Europe, and her early subject matter was drawn from Slovak life. She is associated with the Düsseldorf school of painting. She began exhibiting there and in 1844 attracted public attention for the first time. After she moved to Rome, her paintings were primarily of local life. When Baumann was not travelling, she spent many hours a day in her studio in Rome. She was particularly fond of the Italian painters. Baumann had great success abroad, however, and had a special following in France where she was twice represented at the World Fair in Paris, first in 1867 and again in 1878. In 1852, she exhibited some of her paintings in London, and Queen Victoria requested a private presentation in Buckingham Palace. Among the portraits presented to the Queen was her painting of Hans Christian Andersen, completed in 1850.

== The harems of the Ottoman Empire ==
In 1869–1870, Baumann traveled extensively in the Eastern Mediterranean and Middle East, and again in 1874–1875 accompanied by her son Harald. Being a woman, she was able to gain access to the harems of the Ottoman Empire and as a result was able to paint scenes of harem life from personal observation, in contrast to most artists of the time, whose work on this popular subject was entirely derived from the imagination or other artists in the same position as themselves (see Orientalism). Nevertheless, as Roberts points out, she had to curb her desire to paint the women of the harems as Europeans liked to imagine them because they insisted on being painted in the latest Paris fashions.

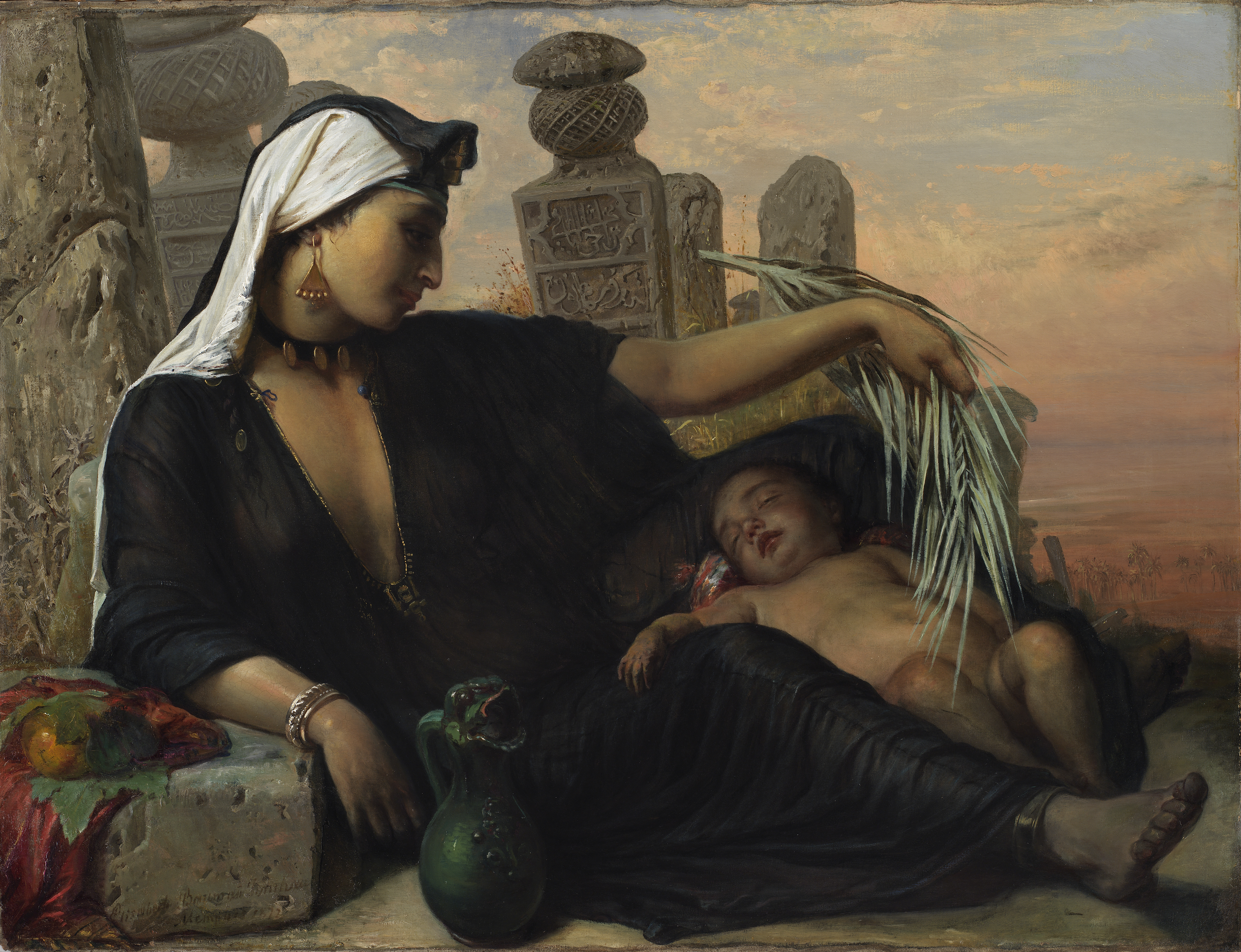
A fellah woman with her child, 1872

In 1869, she was admitted into the harem of Mustafa Fazil Paşa. She was able to gain entry because of her royal patronage in Denmark and brought with her a letter of introduction from Princess Alexandra of Denmark by then the Princess of Wales. The princess had accompanied her husband (the future Edward VII) on a grand tour which included the Ottoman Empire, earlier that year, and therefore had great influence. But the fact that Mustafa was a liberal in favour of a Western style constitutional government and was a vocal proponent of modernization played an important part in her being granted entry. She was entranced by Mustafa Paşa's daughter Nazlı and wrote home to her husband and children, 'Yesterday I fell in love with a beautiful Turkish Princess'.

Her work from this period is sometimes decorative and frequently sentimental but with a fine sense of colour and lighting. The sensualism in some of these paintings was still considered taboo in some parts of Europe and the Danish art world tried to keep these works out of sight. Until recently, her paintings were kept in museum storerooms in Denmark. The erotic quality in many of her husband's statues may have helped her to disregard this provincialism in spite of the obvious social risks to a woman at the time.

== Personal life ==
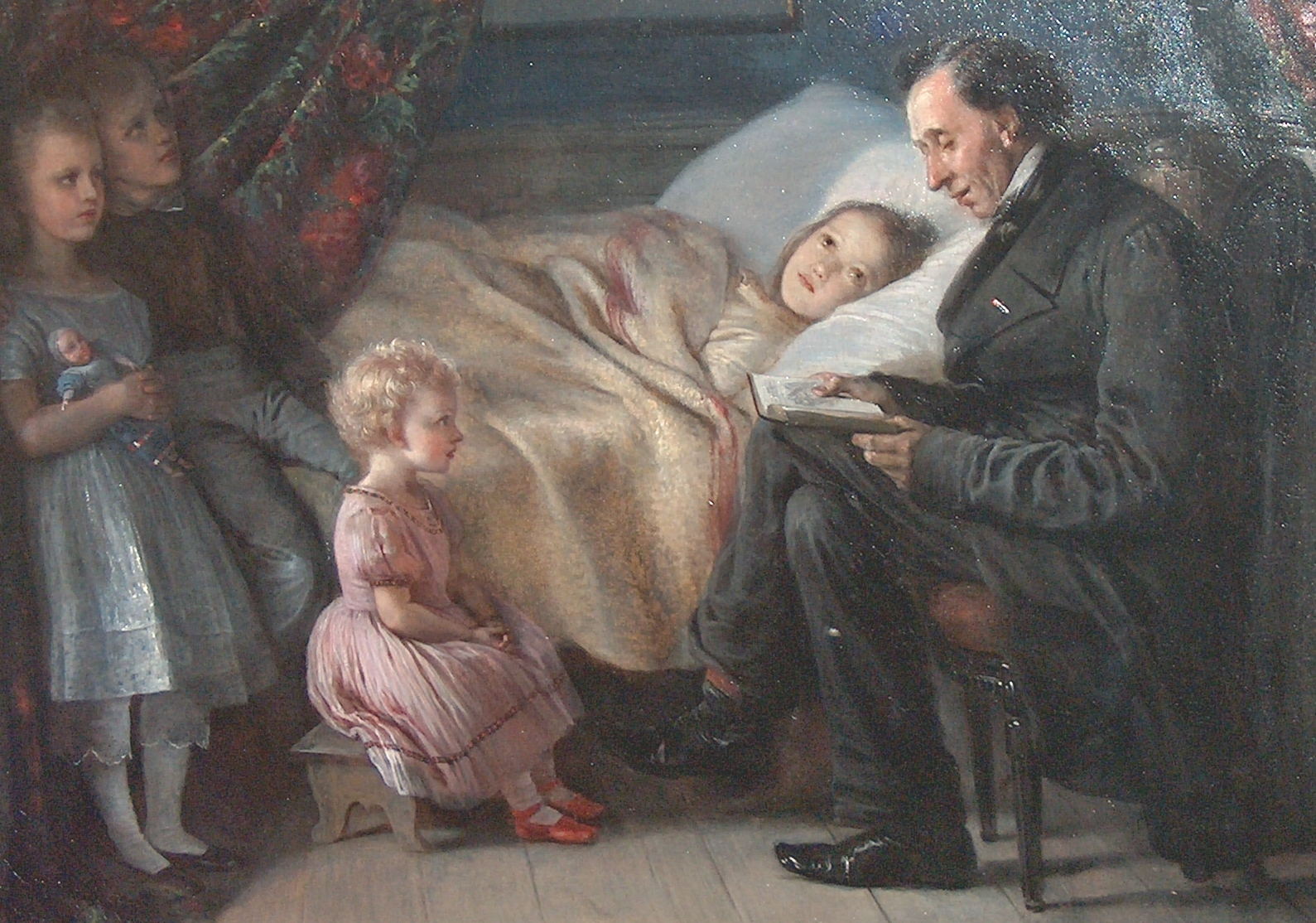
Painting of Hans Christian Andersen reading to some of the painter's children, 1862

Baumann met her husband, Jens Adolf Jerichau, an art professor, in Rome. They married in 1846 and had nine children, two of whom died in infancy. Of the rest, several became accomplished painters, including Harald Jerichau (1851–1878), who died of malaria and typhus in Rome, and Holger Hvitfeldt Jerichau (1861–1900) who painted primarily impressionistic landscapes. His work earned the favour of the Russian Royal Family whose patronage helped him finance his foreign travels. He was called "a true visionary and talented artist" by the art critics of the time and had many successful exhibitions but, like his older brother, died young at age 41. One of his paintings sold for over $12,000 in 1991. She has several other descendants who are artists and her grandson J.A. Jerichau (1891–1916) was one of Denmark's most talented modernist painters.

=== Children ===
- Thorald Harald Adolph Carol Lorentz (1848)
- Marie (1850)
- Harald (1851)
- Caroline Elisabeth Nanny (1853)
- Louise (1859)
- Sophie Dagmar Elisabeth (1859)
- Holger Hvitfeldt (1861)

== Selected works ==
Title	Medium	Date	Collection	Dimensions	Image
Italian Inn	oil on canvas	between 1838-1881	Nationalmuseum	22 cm × 172 cm	
Jens Adolf Jerichau	oil on canvas	1846	National Gallery of Denmark	94 cm × 142 cm	
Mother Denmark	oil on canvas	1851	Ny Carlsberg Glyptotek	119 cm × 149 cm	
Double portrait of the brothers Jacob and Wilhelm Grimm	oil on canvas	1855	Staatliche Museen zu Berlin	54 cm × 63 cm	
A young girl reads out the Bible, the grandparents listen devoutly	oil on canvas	1854	Private collection	34 cm × 42 cm	
A Wounded Danish Soldier	oil on canvas	1865	National Gallery of Denmark	107 cm × 142.5 cm	
An Egyptian Fellah Woman with her Baby	oil on canvas	1873	National Gallery of Denmark	98.5 cm × 129.2 cm	
Mermaid	oil on canvas	1873	Ny Carlsberg Glyptotek	98 cm × 126 cm	
An Egyptian Pot Seller at Gizeh	oil on canvas	1876-78	National Gallery of Denmark	92 cm × 114 cm	

=== Drawings ===
- Portrait of Jenny Lind (1845), 19x21.5 Pencil
- A child, 'Titi' (1856), Gouache/paper
- An Angel (1857) Watercolour, pencil/paper
- Damenportrait (1859) 19x13 Ink
- Portraet af egyptisk kvinde or Portrait of an Egyptian fellah woman holding a wine jug (dated Cairo 1870). With Baraset House Fine Art.
- Höjtlaesning ved sygelejet (1878), 11.5x19 Ink
- Höjtlaesning ved sygelejet (1878), 11.5x19 Ink/paper
- Havfrue 21x31, Pencil/paper
- Adam og Eva 32x21, Pencil/paper
- Dameportraet, Pencil/paper
- Portraet af Johanne-Luise Heiberg, 8x6Ink, pen
- Lille dreng med bog, 31x21 Pencil/paper

== Written works ==
Elisabeth Jerichau-Baumann wrote two books about her life:

- Ungdomserindringer (Youthful Memories) (1874)
- Brogede rejsebilleder (Motley Travel Pictures), Copenhagen (1881)

== See also ==
- Art of Denmark
- Mermaid (Jerichau-Baumann)

== Bibliography ==
- Nicolaj Bøgh, Elisabeth Jerichau-Baumann (Copenhagen 1886).
- Sigurd Müller, Nyere dansk Malerkunst, Copenhagen (1884).
- Peter Nørgaard Larsen, Elisabeth Jerichau Baumann, Øregaard Museum (1996)
- Peter Nørgaard Larsen in: Weilbach, Vol. 4, Copenhagen (1996).
- Elisabeth Oxfeldt, (2005), Nordic Orientalism: Paris and the Cosmopolitan Imagination 1800–1900, Museum Tusculanum Press. ISBN 87-635-0134-1
- Sine Krogh og Birgitte Fink, Breve fra London. Elisabeth Jerichau Baumann og den victorianske kunstverden, Ny Carlsbergfondet og Strandberg Publishing (2018)
