= An Egyptian Pot Seller at Gizeh =

Painting by Elisabeth Jerichau Baumann

- En egyptiske pottesælgerske i Gizeh (Danish)
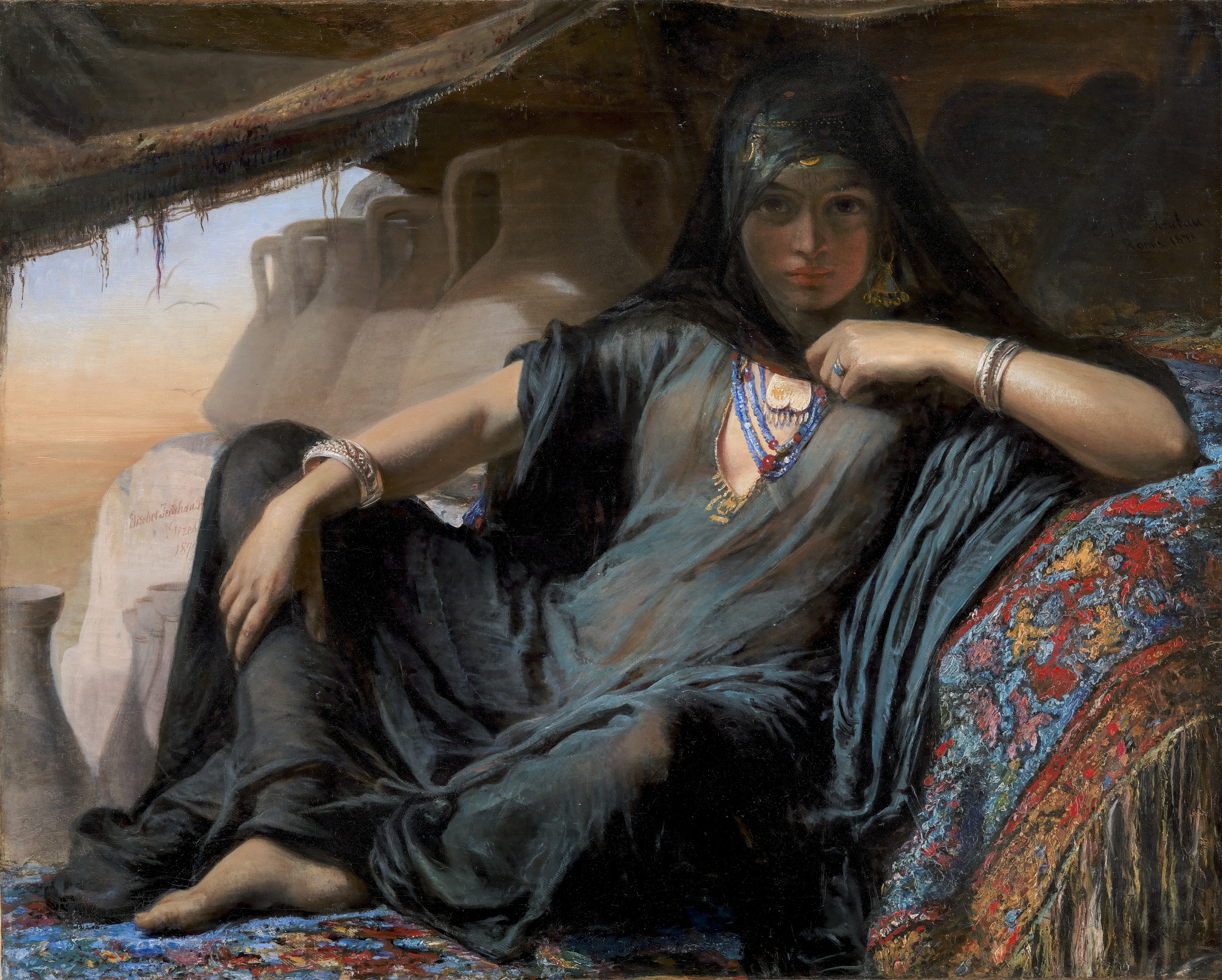
- Artist: Elisabeth Jerichau-Baumann
- Year: 1876–1878
- Medium: oil on canvas
- Dimensions: 92 cm × 114 cm (36 in × 45 in)
- Location: National Gallery of Denmark; Copenhagen
- Website: www.smk.dk/en/highlight/an-egyptian-pot-seller-at-gizeh-1876-78/

An Egyptian Pot Seller at Gizeh (Danish: En egyptiske pottesælgerske i Gizeh) is one of several paintings of Oriental women by Polish-Danish painter Elisabeth Jerichau-Baumann. It is considered one of her best works.

== Artist's background ==
Elisabeth Baumann was educated at the art academy in Düsseldorf in 1838–1845. In 1846, she married the Danish sculptor Jens Adolf Jerichau in Rome and moved to Copenhagen.

Throughout her life, Jerichau-Baumann travelled widely. In the 1850s, she visited the Middle East and North Africa on pleasure trips with her husband. She later visited Turkey, Greece, and Egypt on two more trips, in 1869–1870 and again in 1874–1875, now with the express reason of painting different motifs in the popular Orientalist style. The Orientalist movement had gained prominence with artists such as Jean-Auguste-Dominique Ingres, Eugène Delacroix and Jean-Léon Gérôme. In the 1830s, Martinus Rørbye was the first Danish artist to produce paintings from the region. Henriette Browne was the first artist to offer a female perspective on the Orientalist subject matter.

== History ==
Jerichau-Baumann painted An Egyptian Pot Seller at Gizeh upon her return from her journey to Turkey, Greece and Egypt in 1874–1875. It was completed in Rome in 1878. The painting was possibly commissioned by Sultan Abdülaziz, but was still not completed by the time of his death in 1877. The painting was exhibited at the Charlottenborg Exhibition in 1879. It was for sale for DKK 3,500 but did not find a buyer. After her death, it was sold at an auction of her estate in 1883 for DKK 2,100 to Ida Marie Suhr. She later endowed both her estate Petersgaard and the painting to her nephew Jens Juel. After his death, the painting was sold by his widow Clara Iuel at a Bruun Rasmussen auction in 1977 for DKK 16,000 to Hamburg-based Ludwig Karl Erich Christian Detlev Alexander Graf zu Reventlow (1941–). On 27 November 1996, it was again put up for sale at a Bruun Rasmussen auction but failed to reach the minimum price of DKK one million. It was later sold at an unknown price to the actress and writer Birgit Pouplier. In 1996, she published the biographical novel Lisinka about Jerichau-Baumann. After her death, it was sold by her husband Knud Jerichau Nielsen to the National Gallery of Denmark in 2016.

== Description ==
Jerichau-Baumann’s painting depicts a young woman who is wearing a fairly transparent garment while looking directly at the viewer. Chief curator and senior researcher at the National Gallery of Denmark, Peter Nørgaard Larsen, who has ranked the painting among his favourite works in the museum's collection, has observed, "you get the sense that here we face strong personality who is not ready to simply be sex object, but has strong self-esteem. In this respect, Elisabeth Jerichau Baumann's pictures are very different from what we generally call European Orientalism—a long tradition of male artists painting beautiful women dressed in very little; pictures that were painted by men bought by men and looked at by men. She had a different sensibility, as is apparent in this picture, and that makes her unique in Danish and European art history".

== Related works ==
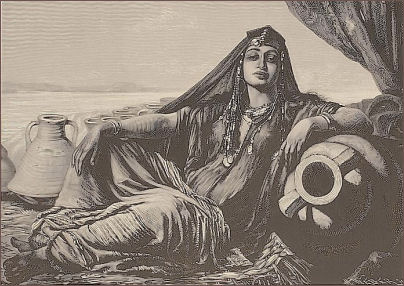
Illustration from Georg Ebers' 1879–1880 work Ägypten in Bild und Wort

The painting is based on another Jerichau-Baumann painting, Pottery Seller, from 1876, in which the woman is posed in a similar lounging position, but with a different background. This painting was sold at the 1883 auction of Jerichau-Baumann's estate to the writer Wilhelm Bergsøe. This painting was used as one of numerous illustrations in Georg Ebers' monumental 1879–1880 work Ägypten in Bild und Wort. In 1998, it was sold by Christie's in London for £60.000.
