= Elisabeth Hering =

East German writer of historical novels and children's literature (1909–1999)

- Elisabeth Hering
- Born: Elisabeth Leicht; 17 January 1909; Klausenburg, Austria-Hungary (now Cluj-Napoca, Romania)
- Died: 15 July 1999 (aged 90); Leipzig, Germany
- Occupations: Writer; East German; 20th century
- Writing career
- Language: German
- Period: 1951–1992
- Genres: Historical novel, Children's literature
- Notable work: Der Oirol: Zwei Liebesgeschichten aus dem alten Korea (1951)

Elisabeth Hering (née Leicht, first married name Ackner; 17 January 1909, Klausenburg, Austria-Hungary – 15 July 1999, Leipzig, Germany) was an East German writer, primarily known for her work in historical novels and children's literature. In 1956, she received the Ministry of Culture of the GDR award for the best work for children and youth.

Hering came from an educated family of Transylvanian Saxons in Transylvania, then in Austria-Hungary and now in Romania. In her first marriage, she was the wife of a pastor and had five children. Since 1944, she lived in East Germany, primarily in Leipzig. In 1951, she published her first works in the historical novel genre, producing eleven books focused on Ancient Egypt, Korea, Muslim countries, and Germany and Austria from the 17th to 20th centuries. She also published two children's books, a popular science work on the history of Middle Eastern scripts, and retellings and adaptations of German and Romanian fairy tales, Eastern epics, and Scandinavian sagas. Her works have been translated into six languages, including Russian, Italian, and Hungarian. After 2011, the Leipzig-based publisher Buchfunk Verlag reissued Hering's works in electronic format and as audiobooks.

== Biography ==
=== Early years ===
Elisabeth Leicht was born in Klausenburg, Austria-Hungary (now Cluj-Napoca, Romania), on Sunday, 17 January 1909. She belonged to the German minority in Transylvania and was the first child of lawyer Hans Leicht and his 21-year-old wife, Eliza Bacon. The Transylvanian Saxons in urban settings were considered "patricians", typically engaged in liberal professions and affiliated with the Lutheran Church. Her maternal grandfather, Josef Bacon, was a city doctor in Schässburg (now Sighișoara), also maintaining a private practice. Josef Bacon was best known for his historical studies: he collected items of Transylvanian folk culture and art, was passionate about landscape gardening, and later opened a local history museum in the Old Tower. He also led the city's Templar lodge. Josef once took his daughter on a trip to the Balkans and Italy; he had a cool relationship with his son-in-law. Due to her parents' modest income, Elisabeth's childhood was spent in her grandfather's house. The maids were Hungarians, and they arose her interest in languages. In middle school, studying Romanian became mandatory after Romanian troops entered Transylvania in 1918. Elisabeth's sister, Irmgard (born 1913), remembered that earning good grades in Romanian was considered shameful among the Saxons.

Grandfather Josef recognized Elisabeth's intellectual abilities and nurtured them. As a child, she got diphtheria and received an experimental vaccine purchased by Dr. Bacon at a medical congress in Jena. From age 12, Elisabeth was entrusted with leading tours at the local history museum; around the same time, she began writing poetry, emulating her father. She also developed a love for reading aloud (initially to relatives her age), a passion she maintained into old age. In 1923, Romania banned co-education, and Elisabeth, after nine years of study, was forced to leave the only school in Sighișoara. The school's teaching standard was high; for instance, mathematics and physics were taught by Hermann Oberth. A German girls' school existed in Sibiu, but the family lacked the means to send her there. Despite the birth of a third daughter, Gerda, in 1919, Hans Leicht (a classmate of Béla Kun and a commissar for minority affairs in the Hungarian Soviet Republic) demanded a divorce.

=== First marriage ===
Elisabeth Hering wrote briefly about her first marriage in her later autobiography, noting only that at 18, she married pastor Hans Ackner, who was twice her age and prone to alcoholism. Hans later recalled that she handed him a letter proposing marriage after a church service. Dr. Bacon gave his consent, and the engagement took place on his 70th birthday. Elisabeth was sent to her aunt in Halchiu to learn cooking and household management. The wedding occurred on 23 June 1927. Elisabeth and Hans's children and grandchildren speculated that her primary motivation for the hasty marriage was to pass her matura exams. The marriage began poorly: the honeymoon in Sibiu was marked by frequent arguments. Elisabeth's first pregnancy was complicated by kidney inflammation, and she spent two or three months with a high fever. Her premature son, born at seven months, was baptized by his father and lived only two weeks.

In 1929, Pastor Ackner was sent to Leipzig for advanced training before taking a parish. Elisabeth accompanied him to Budapest, where she met her father and his new wife. In Leipzig, she pursued self-education, and her relationship with Hans improved. She then spent three months in Basel learning newborn care, living under the supervision of her husband's mentor, Pastor Ansbach. In September, the couple reunited in Breslau and moved to the Markersbach parish. Her second pregnancy was again complicated by kidney, prompting her to seek treatment with an aunt in Dresden. In 1930, through Elisabeth's efforts, Hans secured a parish in Sibiu, her hometown, where their son Richard was born on 26 May. The subsequent years of their marriage were tumultuous: Hans had outbursts, physically abused Elisabeth, and later repented. Once, during a vacation in Varna, Elisabeth left him but returned out of duty. Their daughter Lizchen was born in 1933. In 1934, the couple attended a German crafts exhibition in Germany, where Elisabeth promoted Transylvanian folk art, led tours, and gave lectures. In 1936, Frau Ackner independently showcased an exhibition of Transylvanian costumes in Hamburg. The couple earned enough to buy a house in Hammersdorf, a suburb of Sibiu, where their sons Hermann (24 November 1939) and Fritz (17 December 1941) were born. Their relationship deteriorated further, with Hans openly engaging in affairs with married women or schoolteacher colleagues. No personal accounts from Elisabeth survive from these years.

=== World War II and divorce ===
In 1940, the German community of Transylvania came under the authority of Nazi Germany. Elisabeth sought intellectual self-expression, contributing to newspapers and joining an association of Transylvanian Germans founded by family friend and schoolteacher Wilhelm Schunn (1888–1965). Hans served under Bishop Wilhelm Staedel, who in 1942 established a Romanian branch of the Institute for the Study and Elimination of Jewish Influence on German Church Life. On 15 March 1942, the newspaper Südostdeutsche Tageszeitung published an open letter, Confession of German Pastors, calling the de-Judaization of church service and life being an urgent and deliberate task. Hans Ackner's signature appeared among the signatories. He was later sent to the Soviet Union on a mission to provide pastoral care to resettled Soviet Germans on territories occupied by the Wehrmacht. In November 1942, Pastor Ackner traveled to Transnistria and Odesa, staying until May 1943. In July, the Evangelical mission was relocated to the General Government, and Elisabeth with her children, arrived to Cernăuți (German: Cernowitz) on 30 September and Lemberg on 1 October. Wilhelm Schunn accompanied her, as authorities believed the Transylvanian Germans' community organization experience would be useful. Hans was often absent, overseeing 28 villages, which took about a month to visit. He eventually settled the family in Stryi, where houses became available after the ghetto's liquidation. Thirteen-year-old Richard was sent to his grandmother in Sighișoara, increasing expenses, as money transfers to Romania were delayed. Hans secured a temporary pastor position in Stryi. On 18 August 1944, he retrieved Richard from Romania, five days before the country joined the Anti-Hitler Coalition. On 1 September 1944, Romania's Ministry of Culture dismissed Hans for "hostile actions against the Romanian state". When Elisabeth got pregnant for the sixth time, Hans sent her to Thuringia, near Erfurt, where their youngest daughter, Wilhelmine ("Wilmi"), was born on 8 December. This area later became part of the GDR.

By spring 1945, the Ackner family's situation was dire due to property loss during evacuation, and Richard, drafted into the Volkssturm, was missing. The war's end clarified that Hans and Elisabeth had no reason to stay together: Hans's diary entry on 16 August noted Elisabeth's firm declaration that they would part “when things return to normal”. The winter of 1945–1946 was spent in a pastor's village house, all crowded in one heated room. Elisabeth's illness caused concern in Hans's diary, as he relied heavily on her for household matters. The family survived the summer by working in fields and gardens, subsisting on foraged food, unable to afford new clothes or provisions. Hans's diary noted 14 days of eating only vegetables and water-based soups without fats or flour. Their eldest daughter worked at the Magdalena Asylum in Altenburg, attending secondary school. Hans's last diary entry was dated 22 June 1947. In 1949, he received a new parish near Altenburg. A court ruling on 26 November 1951 dissolved Hans and Elisabeth's marriage. In 1950, a severe conflict arose between Hans and Richard, who dropped out of 12th grade, joined the SED, and worked at the Wismut Soviet-German enterprise, leading its party cell. Hans disowned him, and they did not speak for over a decade. The younger sons were to stay with Hans, but his second marriage to a widow with two children was highly unsuccessful, prompting Elisabeth to take Hermann and Fritz. Hans Ackner died on 30 January 1967 in Mühlhausen.

=== New vocation and second marriage ===
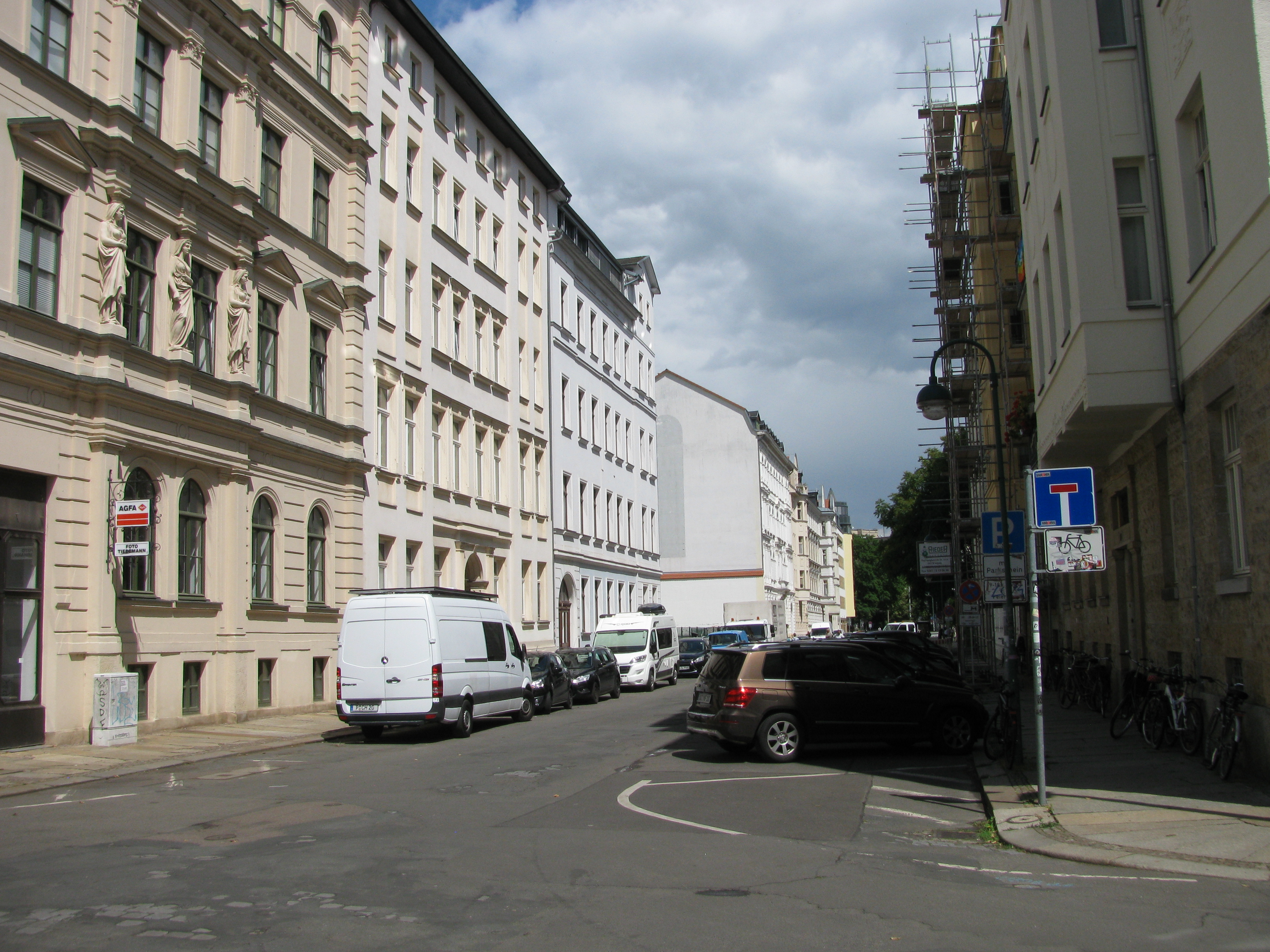
View of Lessingstraße in Leipzig

Elisabeth Ackner had literary ambitions from youth, but her poetic works and the novella Jakob Reiziger remained unfinished. In a 1958 public lecture, she noted that as a mother of five, she lacked time and energy for writing. Poetry was possible only when "the children were not just in bed but quiet, and mental work kept me awake in the dark". If she recalled the text in the morning, she wrote it down. Writing was a deeply conscious need for Elisabeth. From the years before her divorce, two essays survived: Thoughts on Marriage Legislation and Woman in the Light of the Gospel, penciled on the back of parish documents, including birth and death certificates.

After the divorce, Elisabeth settled in Leipzig, using family silver smuggled from Romania as startup capital, occasionally pawning and redeeming it. She initially rented a room with the Chevalier family, then, in 1952, secured an apartment at Sebastian-Bach-Straße 30. Her three remaining children were diligent students, leaving her time for writing. In 1951, under the name Ackner, she published the novel Oyrol – Two Love Stories in Ancient Korea and a retelling of the Korean tale Hong Gildong. Her editor, Walter Hering, 14 years her senior and in a prolonged divorce, quickly bonded with Elisabeth. They became engaged and lived together from 1952. She began keeping typed copies of correspondence, which, in the absence of diaries, became a key source for her biography and literary work. Intimate experiences with Walter were confided to her mother in Romania. On 8 January, Elisabeth wrote that living with Walter gave her hope that the second half of her life will be far better than the first: literary earnings stabilized her life, and Oyrol was well-received. In September 1952, they moved to a four-room apartment on the third floor of Lessingstraße 16, where Elisabeth lived until 1995. That autumn, Walter's divorce was finalized; only Hermann lived with Elisabeth and Walter, while Wilmi and Fritz visited their father, who was particularly attached to his youngest daughter. His second wife's jealousy caused frequent conflicts. These tensions led Elisabeth to leave the official church; she and Walter entered a civil marriage, each maintaining a separate bedroom. Besides writing, Elisabeth worked at the Pioneer Palace on Lessingstraße, teaching handicraft courses. From 1953, she led two groups with three daily lessons, later expanding to five groups (three full workdays), earning about half her income. To avoid housing densification, Wilmi was registered at Lessingstraße, where her family later settled after her marriage. When the housekeeper fell ill in February 1954, Elisabeth irritably noted the financial losses from household chores. She signed a contract for a collection of Romanian fairy tales in German translation, still proficient in Romanian. Her sister Gerda, living in their hometown, provided some support.

Between 1952 and 1953, Elisabeth Hering sought a permanent place in the literary world. After her first publisher lost its license, the GDR's Literature and Publishing Office confirmed her copyright ownership and recommended joining the German Writers' Association. Her retelling of Hong Gildong was rejected in a youth literature contest as insufficiently democratic but recommended for the next. Efforts to adapt Oyrol for radio failed, as did an approach to Union Verlag Berlin in 1954. However, from 1961 to 1977, the publisher released five of her historical novels, facilitated by her 1959 acquaintance with editor Johannes Bobrowski.

In 1955, Elisabeth visited her homeland for the first time in years. Her accent seemed "uneducated" in Leipzig and Berlin. Obtaining visas for Walter and Wilmi was delayed; her elderly mother sent a list of requests in March. Elisabeth aimed to introduce Walter to her family and place 10-year-old Wilmi with Wilhelm Schunn's family. The trip succeeded, including a stop in Budapest to meet Hans Leicht's widow, Katarina. Returning to Romania permanently was not considered, as her family, contacts, and readership were tied to the GDR. Her mother visited Leipzig in 1957 but refused to stay, dying in Sighișoara the following year. Irmgard visited Leipzig in 1963 and, with her family, repatriated to Ingolstadt, West Germany, in 1977, joining a large Transylvanian Saxon community. Elisabeth owned a Trabant but never learned to drive, maintaining family ties.

From 1955 to 1961, Elisabeth served as a lay judge in Leipzig's People's District Court. Surviving commendations show her dedication, including training new judges. An undated manuscript, The Lay Judge and Civil Court, urged judges to take civil cases seriously, as they reflected diverse legal practices. She emphasized fairness, stating that both parties, including the losing side, should trust the ruling, as just decisions bolstered state confidence, while poor ones undermined it.

=== German Yearly Meeting and GDR State Security ===
In 1961, Elisabeth purchased an abandoned beaver farm in Altenhain with royalties: a rural house without plumbing or gas but with a swimming spot in an old quarry. The spacious house accommodated the families of Hermann, Fritz, and Wilmi, who lived nearby. Richard, a high-ranking SED official, resided in Neubrandenburg.

Near Lessingstraße was a Quaker community (Society of Friends as part of the Deutsche Jahresversammlung). Elisabeth first attended a meeting in March 1953 and later a Quaker conference in Dresden with Walter, whose family followed Steiner's anthroposophy. She was drawn to Quaker silent contemplation, experiencing a vision of light saying, "Peace be with you!" Her strong social responsibility led her to represent her community at the Christian Peace Conference in Berlin. In the 1970s, she traveled to the UK for church matters and, after retirement, helped build the Quaker House library in Bad Pyrmont, enabled by her right to travel to West Germany. From 1975 to 1980, she served as clerk of the German Quaker conference, succeeding Helga Brückner. Her Quakerism inspired her 1978 novel "Swarthmoor Hall, Begegnung mit Margaret Fell, die 1614 als Margaret Askew ihren außergewöhnlichen Lebensweg begann, den sie 1702 als Margaret Fox beendete" (Swarthmoor Hall, or Meeting Margaret Fell, Who Began Her Extraordinary Life in 1614 as Margaret Askew, Ending It in 1702 as Margaret Fox). The manuscript was rejected for having "too much religion, too little history" but was published in 2017 by the Bad Pyrmont Quaker conference, later digitized.

The Quakers were monitored by the Stasi. Declassified documents show that between September 1964 and March 1965, Elisabeth was covertly investigated with informants' involvement. A search of her Altenhain house was conducted under the pretext of looking for an unexploded wartime bomb. No grounds for charges were found, and surveillance ceased. In 1961, she lost her lay judge position due to a colleague's denunciation, alleging she was part of a "religious sect" and criticized Nikita Khrushchev. A copy of the denunciation survives in her archive.

=== 1970s–1980s ===
Walter Hering died in 1972.

In April 1974, the SED Politburo and GDR Council of Ministers reviewed the financial status of retired writers. Elisabeth, retired since 1969 with a 210-mark monthly pension, was recognized by the Leipzig Writers' Association for her creative activity. Her 1973 literary royalties totaled 2,433 marks. From 1 September 1974, she received a personal pension of 400 marks monthly. In 1983, with the Association's help, she secured an apartment for Gerda and her family in her building. (Note: All of Elisabeth's relatives lived in the GDR: five children (all with higher education, married) and 14 grandchildren. Up to 25 people, including in-laws, gathered at the family farm in summer, not counting Gerda, who had two daughters and three grandchildren. In the early 1980s, Gerda moved from Sibiu to Leipzig.) Her 70th birthday was celebrated nationally, with congratulations from the Ministry of Culture, Leipzig Regional Council, and the CDU chairman.

Elisabeth had admirers in the Soviet Union, where Nauka published her "Egyptian" novels Pharaohs' slave (1968) and Pharaoh's Sculptor (1971). As the USSR did not join the Universal Copyright Convention, she received no royalties but was granted stays at Soviet Writers' Union writers' retreats and reader tours. In 1970, with Wilmi, she visited Moscow, Kyiv, Tbilisi, and rested in Gagra. In 1973, with Quaker friend Helga Brückner, she visited Bukhara and Samarkand, settings for her novel "Schatten Gottes auf Erden." In 1976, she attended a writers' seminar in Moscow and last rested in Pitsunda in 1977. She also traveled to the UK and West Germany for Quaker matters.

During a four-week USSR trip in 1976, Elisabeth met Soviet German writers and representatives from Moscow, Pavlodar, and Almaty, visiting the Neues Leben journal for Soviet Germans. She formed a lasting friendship with Nelli Wacker and the Warkentin family, sending them books and records. In 1981, she helped the Warkentins obtain documents to repatriate to the GDR, a rare feat. In a letter to Nelli Wacker, she noted her post-retirement travel rights to West Germany, including visits to Stuttgart, but felt she could not take root there, satisfied with Leipzig.

In the late 1980s, Elisabeth remained active in the Writers' Association, securing Soviet book deliveries and tracking German literature translations in the East. After German reunification in 1990, GDR Writers' Association members could join the West German equivalent. Her application noted no recent royalties, with her sole income being a 762-mark pension plus a 100-mark cultural fund supplement. Membership was approved with a 10-mark monthly fee, reduced to 1.5 marks for pensioners from 1992, facilitated by the IG Medien in Stuttgart.

=== Death and legacy ===
In 1996, at 86, Elisabeth moved to a Leipzig nursing home due to inability to care for herself. Biographer Ula Schäfer noted the staff's amazement at her children's constant presence, maintaining a vigil. In her final two years, bedridden, her vision and hearing declined sharply; she died on 15 July 1999. Per her eldest daughter's wish, she was buried in Radefeld near Schkeuditz. On 20 July, her friend, Quaker Heinrich Brückner, delivered the sermon. Her archive is held at the Leipzig City Library. Thanks to her niece, actress Karin Decker-Tat, her centenary in 2009 was marked by readings and a memorial exhibition from January to March at the Leipzig library. Her works are stored there but are not in open access, available upon request. In 2014, her relatives organized an exhibition for the 15th anniversary of her death. In 2019, marking her 110th birth and 20th death anniversaries, Ula Schäfer published a comprehensive biography using Hering's literary and personal archives, focusing on her work methods, family life, and social circles.

== Literary work ==
=== Overview ===
Between 1955 and 1992, Elisabeth Hering published 24 books, eleven of which were cultural-historical novels. Her oeuvre includes two children's books, a popular science work on the history of writing and the decipherment of various writing systems, which saw two editions in a short time, and adaptations of German fairy tales, legends, the Mahabharata, and Norse sagas. Egyptologist N. S. Petrovsky situated Hering's work within the tradition of German historical fiction, a genre associated with G. Ebers.

According to her children, Richard Ackner and Wilma Gerber, Hering turned to the historical genre to preserve fundamental human values, the origins of which she believed could be found only in the past. Her first historical novel, Saga of the South Sea (1956), was dedicated to Easter Island and received an award from the GDR Ministry of Culture for the best work for children and youth. Two novels, Pharaoh's Maid (1959) and Pharaoh's Sculptor (1968), were set in the era of Ancient Egypt's New Kingdom. Later works featured historical figures such as Jan Hus, Hugo Grotius, and Ulugh Beg. Hering's works were popular in East Germany and were officially published in West Germany. Some of her works were translated into Russian, Hungarian, Romanian, Estonian, Slovak, and Italian. She was most frequently published by Union Verlag Berlin and Boje Verlag Stuttgart, though print runs were often limited due to the planned economy and paper shortages.

In a 1979 interview, Hering stated that one of the central themes in her work was the abuse of power. This theme was particularly evident in her novel Aspasia Accused, where she aimed to depict the agonistic nature of Western European civilization, starting from its cradle in Ancient Greece. Pericles sought Athenian hegemony, while Spartan rulers pursued the same goal. Hering described "agonistic thinking" as having two expressions: peaceful, as seen in the Ancient Olympic Games, and violent, in the wars between city-states. In both contexts, youth were raised under the motto "always be first and strive to surpass others". The two world wars, she argued, demonstrated the urgent need to abandon this mindset.

=== Early Career and GDR Writers' Association Membership ===
Hering's first completed work was a cycle of thirty poems dedicated to Elise Lensing, the beloved of Christian Friedrich Hebbel. When asked about the origins of her literary work and target audience during reader meetings, Hering often said that, upon reaching the age of forty, she had to decide whether she could achieve results in literature or should no longer devote time and energy to it. She believed writing was primarily for oneself, serving as a means of "calming the heart" and "clarifying one's thoughts," though true literary work was far from self-indulgence. Her poetic cycle and three short stories caught the attention of Fritz Schulze, an editor at Rupert-Verlag, who informed her that printing poetry and stories was unprofitable due to paper shortages and commissioned her to write a novel. To earn a living, Hering was recommended to the Ernst Wunderlich publishing house for children's and young adult literature. Private publishers in the GDR operated in a pre-war mode (with adjustments for shortages and planned allocations) until 1953. The theme was quickly decided: during the Korean War, Hering proposed publishing a collection of Korean fairy tales, a genre popular with both children and adults. Fairy tales had appealed to Hering since childhood; her father's library contained the complete 40-volume anthology The World Literature Fairy Tales (1912–1940). Early on, she identified universal narrative patterns recurring across global literatures. She found a source in the Leipzig University library—a collection of Korean tales recorded by German consul Arnus. In her autobiography, Hering wrote that working with this collection was a shock, as Korean tales differed significantly from Arabic and Indian ones: "Where were the abducted princesses, enchanted princes, witches, trolls, and elves familiar to every child? Nothing of the sort! Even evil was personified not by a devil, but by a corrupt official!" The socially critical tales aligned with the political climate and were included in the publishing plan but did not relieve her obligations to Fritz Schulze. From Arnus's collection, Hering adapted two plots into a novella, accepted by Rupert-Verlag under the title Oiroi. Like the Korean fairy tale collection published in 1951, these were the first and last works Hering published under the surname "Ackner." Walter Hering, a staff editor at Rupert-Verlag, took an active role in their creation; their first (still professional) correspondence dates to August 24, 1951. That same year, Hering joined the GDR Writers' Association in Altenburg.

Two years later, Hering was expelled from the Association for low publication activity. In 1953, she reapplied and was advised to seek consideration through the young writers' bureau. By 1960, with ten published books and two more in preparation, she applied again but received a formal response suggesting she wait until after the Fifth GDR Writers' Congress (May 25–27, 1961). In October 1961, Hering reapplied and received unofficial indications that her admission was undesirable. On November 14, 1962, the Leipzig writers' council informed the central office of the GDR Writers' Association that a positive decision had been made regarding Hering, with recommendations from Georg Maurer and Hanna Klose-Greger. Unaware of this, Hering requested urgent reconsideration on December 19, as the process had been delayed for two years. She was finally notified of her acceptance into the Association on March 11, 1963, and received her membership card. The card was reissued in 1975 and 1986, as it provided privileges, including access to foreign library collections. Membership also enabled the installation of a telephone in her Lessingstrasse apartment.

=== Writing Method ===
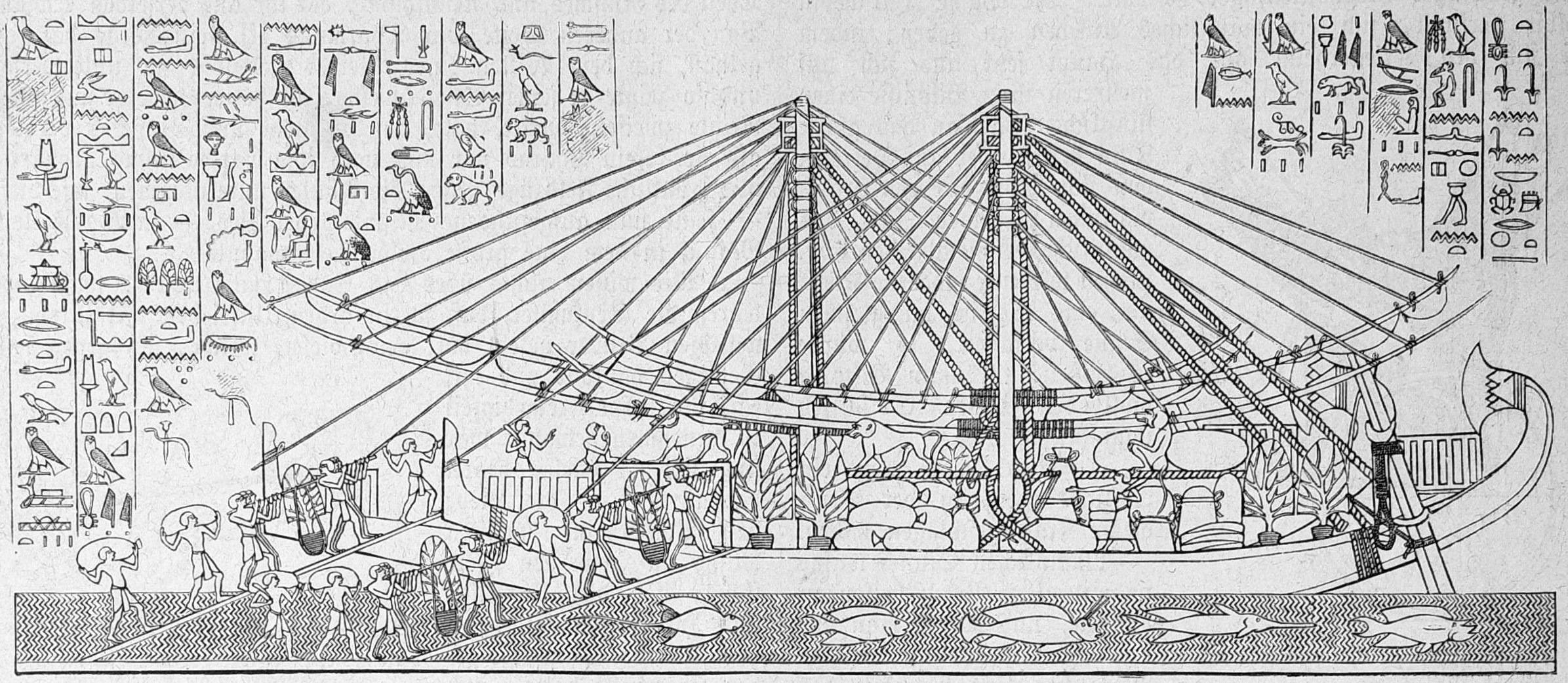
Loading treasures from the Punt land onto Hatshepsut's ships. Illustration of a relief from the mortuary temple at Deir el-Bahri in a Leipzig journal, 1886.

Hering's creative approach took shape in the 1950s. Working primarily in the historical genre, she meticulously consulted sources and reference materials (her biography lists encyclopedias from her personal library). Initially, she wrote in A5 notebooks, finding it most comfortable to read and write while lying down. Even in old age, Hering retained a large, school-like handwriting, described by biographer U. Schäfer as highly legible, facilitating the work of publishers' typists and later researchers. Over time, her manuscripts became exclusively typewritten. Like many writers, Hering preferred to write clean drafts with minimal revisions. In a 1982 interview, she described developing a specific writing formula and method. When a topic got her interest, she began with encyclopedias and reviewed library works cited in bibliographies, noting that "one source always leads to another". Her study housed a collection of 19th- and 20th-century German encyclopedias, including large dictionaries by Meyer and Der Große Brockhaus (acquired after 1990), as well as eight- and eighteen-volume GDR editions of Meyer's dictionary (the DDR-Lexikon). Her research notes always exceeded the final manuscript's page count. She then created a timeline to align episodes and minimize anachronisms and inconsistencies. Only after this preparation did she begin writing, striving to stay within the bounds of known sources and avoiding attributing undocumented traits to historical figures, as far as possible in fiction. Historical characters were thus secondary, with the narrative led by a fictional protagonist. Examples include a native of Land of Punt in Pharaoh's Maid and the sculptor Thutmose in Pharaoh's Sculptor, known historically only by name. Hering avoided rigid genre templates, as her work depended on the available sources. Her poetics often featured flashbacks in the first person. She considered Pharaoh's Maid her creative pinnacle; the novel's main action unfolds as the protagonist's memories, recounted to her son on the eve of her death in a single night. Set in the palace of the female pharaoh Hatshepsut, the narrative from a Nubian maid's perspective was convenient, as historical sources often omitted details of daily life, emotions, and other nuances. The plot is structured around the reliefs of Hatshepsut's mortuary temple at Deir el-Bahari.

Hering considered one year the optimal time to write a novel and maintained this pace during her first decade. Even the 500-page novel Deacon of Monstab was completed in a year. In 1982, she shared certain psychological approaches, stating that images in her mind formed gradually, but once the material was fully gathered and shaped, "the figures [became] clearer, their voices louder and louder". In this state, external distractions caused her almost physical discomfort. Thus, in the final stages, she wrote clean drafts to quickly "free herself" from the matured concept; interruptions made resuming work challenging.

=== Historical accuracy of Hering's prose ===
In the Soviet Union, Hering's two novels on Ancient Egyptian themes were published by Nauka in the series In the Footsteps of Vanished Cultures of the East with scholarly commentary by N. Petrovsky. The professional egyptologist noted that Hering used significant material from ancient Egyptian sources, particularly in her use of character names. Despite lacking a higher education, she was well-versed in Egypt's historical geography and material culture, as known from archaeological excavations. In Pharaoh's Maid, the protagonist is at the center of events involving Hatshepsut, who usurped power, her steward Senenmut, and Thutmose III, the legitimate king sidelined by Hatshepsut. In the novel's conclusion, Hering proposed her own version of Senenmut's fate: he is executed with the queen's consent for attempting to assassinate Thutmose. This version is not supported by historical sources. Aligning with Soviet historiographical trends, Petrovsky criticized Hering for not connecting the political struggles at the Egyptian court with the era's social dynamics: the conflict between powerful magnates and the middle strata — "small or potential slaveholders".

Hering portrayed the sun-worshipping revolution of Akhenaten "warmly and vividly". However, she depicted the young pharaoh ascending the throne during his father Amenhotep III's lifetime, despite clear evidence that this occurred after his death. The name of the prince, Waenre, is actually an epithet, part of the throne name assigned only after coronation. Hering suggested that the Aten cult was a product of Amenhotep IV (Akhenaten)'s imagination, ignoring its political context and the fact that the cult predated him.

One can note the author's modernized portrayal of Akhenaten's "truth" in our contemporary understanding of the term. This leads to Akhenaten appearing, both to the book's protagonist and the reader, as a fighter for some form of justice, which was not the case. Such examples could be multiplied. However, bearing in mind that a work of fiction, even on a specific historical theme, is not a history textbook, we will not list the shortcomings of these otherwise interesting and engaging novels.

An excerpt from Pharaoh's Sculptor was used in the teachers' manual History of the Ancient World in Artistic-Historical Images (1978) to illustrate the life of Egyptian peasants.

== Works ==
An annotated list of Elisabeth Hering's works was compiled in 1989 by Peter Nakof to mark her 80th birthday, celebrated by the Leipzig City Library. It was revised and expanded by biographer Ula Schäfer. A bibliography, including publications in Quaker periodicals, was compiled by Klaus Bernet for the Biographical Church Dictionary.

- Oirol (Der Oirol: Zwei Liebesgeschichten aus dem alten Korea, 1951) – two love stories set in ancient Korea. The first of two books published under the name E. Ackner by Rupert-Verlag. The story of Li Tseh (Li Tseh: Eine Liebesgeschichte aus dem alten Korea), one of the plots in Oirol, was separately published in 1955 by Insel Verlag.
- Hong Gil Dong (Hong Kil Tong und andere Märchen (aus Korea), 1952) – a reworking of a Korean folk novel. The second book published under the name E. Ackner, issued by the youth publisher Ernst Wunderlich in Leipzig.
- The Three Rescuers (Drei Lebensretter: Eine Erzählung aus den Tagen Behrings, 1955). Published in West Germany as A Brave Heart (Ein tapferes Herz). A novella based on childhood memories of her grandfather Joseph Bacon's medical work.
- Romanian Fairy Tales (Märchen aus Rumänien, 1956, co-authored with Walter Hering); later republished as The Golden Pear Tree (Der goldene Birnbaum und andere Märchen aus Rumänien).
- South Sea Saga (Südseesaga, 1956) – a novel about Easter Island, awarded a prize by the GDR Ministry of Culture.
- Did Noah Already Write? (Schrieb Noah schon?) – a popular science book on the history of writing, co-authored with Walter Hering in 1956. Republished in 1962 as Riddles of Scripture (Rätsel der Schrift); translated into Hungarian and Romanian. The 1962 edition was reviewed in Neues Deutschland, the official newspaper of the SED Central Committee, which called it "valuable" but suggested the author connect the development of writing to humanity's social progress.
- The Pharaoh's Maid (Die Magd der Pharaonen, 1958), a novel set in ancient Egypt. Published by Prisma-Verlag (nationalized Ernst Wunderlich) and Boje-Verlag (Stuttgart, West Germany), translated into Russian, Slovak, and Estonian. The protagonist, a girl from the land of Punt, gains the attention of a court priest through her pet monkey and becomes a maid to Queen Hatshepsut and her daughters. After the queen's death and a coup, she bears a child by the new pharaoh Thutmose III but flees the palace, later explaining to her son that she wanted him to remain human.
- Savitri (Savitri: Zwei indische Liebesgeschichten nach dem Mahabharata, 1959) – a love story set in ancient India, based on the Mahabharata.
- Sagas of the Danube and Rhine (Sagen von Donau und Rhein, 1959), published by Altberliner Verlag Lucie Groszer with illustrations by Kurt Eichler.
- Tales and Sagas of the North Sea (Sagen und Märchen von der Nordsee, 1961, published by Altberliner Verlag).
- The Deacon of Monstab (Der Diakon von Monstab, 1961, co-authored with Walter Hering) – a historical novel set on the eve of the Thirty Years' War. Published by Berlin's Union Verlag. The protagonist, Johannes Crusius, a cooper's son from Saxony, strives for unity in the Holy Roman Empire and to overcome the Lutheran-Catholic divide. The novel was praised for its "moderately Protestant perspective" and subtle depiction of characters from diverse social strata.
- The Pharaoh's Sculptor (Der Bildhauer des Pharao, 1963) – a second novel set in ancient Egypt, published by Prisma Verlag and Boje in Stuttgart. Translated into Russian and Italian. The story follows the fictional biography of sculptor Thutmose, who rises from a peasant hut on the Nile through a pottery and quarry to a court sculptor's workshop. His fate intertwines with the new capital Akhetaten and the lives of Akhenaten and Nefertiti. Critics noted the engaging, vivid, and historically accurate narrative, with Thutmose's artistic innovation paralleling the pharaoh's religious revolution.
- The Prisoner's Wife (Die Frau des Gefangenen: Eine Erzählung um Hugo Grotius, 1963), published by Union Verlag, dedicated to the wife of Hugo Grotius, who devoted herself to securing his release from Loevestein Fortress and succeeded.
- In His Image (Ihm zum Bilde, 1965) – a historical novel set in the 14th century, centered on the construction of Erfurt Cathedral and the life of monastic novice Sebald, who, through great suffering, becomes a master of stained glass. Critics appreciated the "simplicity and clarity" in depicting the church schism of the Late Middle Ages: "when countless crimes are committed in God's name, one man dares to act according to his conscience in the name of Christian mercy."
- Accused Aspasia (Angeklagt ist Aspasia, 1967) – a historical novel set in Athens under Pericles. His political opponents publicly accuse his beloved Aspasia to undermine his power and ignite the war with Sparta.
- Clouds Over Vienna (Wolken über Wien, 1970) – Hering's only novel with autobiographical elements. The protagonist, Agnes Tiss, begins an independent life after a falling-out with her mother and becomes an ethnography student. Facing challenges as a woman in academia, she quarrels with her lover Felix. As the Nazis rise to power in Germany, Agnes flees, reuniting with Felix in exile. The novel was highly praised by literary scholar Klaus Werner.
- At His Feet, Cordoba (Zu seinen Füßen Cordoba, 1973) – a cultural-historical novel published by Prisma Verlag, set in 9th-century Al-Andalus, centered on the grand vizier Al-Mansur. In 1975, the Bavarian Ministry of Culture included it in a recommended reading list for secondary schools, a rare testament to Hering's recognition in divided Germany, per U. Schäfer.
- Treasures of the German Fairy Tale Treasury (Kostbarkeiten aus dem deutschen Märchenschatz, 1975), three volumes published by Altberliner Verlag Lucie Groszer. Hering revised each tale, filling plot gaps and removing inconsistencies. A reviewer noted that she "honored the playfulness of young readers, their need for instruction and entertainment".
- Shadow of God on Earth (Schatten Gottes auf Erden, 1977, Union Verlag Berlin). An epic historical novel spanning Switzerland, Italy, Hungary, Georgia, and Timur's empire with its capital Samarkand. Set in the early 15th century, the story is narrated by the son of a Hungarian nobleman and a Georgian woman. Reviewed in Neues Deutschland (28 January 1978, p. 14), critic Helmut Wolle praised Hering's cultural-historical novels for revealing "global historical connections". The protagonist, György, raised at Timur's court, returns to Europe but, alienated by its intolerant clergy, witnesses Jan Hus's death and returns to Samarkand. He works at Ulugh Beg Observatory but is forced to wander again after his patron's murder by religious fanatics. The narrative's historical depth is enhanced by 12 color reproductions of Central Asian miniatures. Wolle questioned whether Hering, as a woman, could authentically narrate from a male perspective, adding a barrier beyond the era's remoteness.
- Turkeys in the Yoke (Die Puten im Joch: rumän. Schwänke, Legenden, Märchen, 1980) – a collection of Romanian humorous schwanks, fairy tales, and legends, published by Gustav Kiepenheuer Verlag.
- Labyrinth of Life (Irrgarten des Lebens, 1984) – Hering's final historical novel, published by Prisma Verlag. The protagonist, Lorenz, a stonemason from Transylvania, saves the young daughter of King Andrew, killed in Naples in 1345 per the plot. He raises her as his own, settles in Buda, and becomes an assistant to the great architect János.
- King Mátyás and the Rátóte (König Mátyás und die Rátóte, Ungarische Schildbürgerstreiche und Anekdoten, 1988) – a collection of Hungarian humorous legends, akin to German Schildbürger tales.
- The Sunken World (Versunkene Welt – Biographische Erinnerungen an die Kindheit, 1992) – memoirs of Hering's Transylvanian childhood, written at her family's request and self-published.
- The Quaker Book (Quäkerbuch, 2017) – a posthumous publication of a 1978 novel, Swarthmoor Hall: Die frühen Tage der Quäker, funded by the Religious Society of Friends in Bad Pyrmont.

After 2011, Leipzig's Buchfunk Verlag reissued all of Hering's works in electronic format and as audiobooks. Half of the audiobook recordings were narrated by her son-in-law, Wolfgang Gerberg.

== Bibliography ==
- Ackner R., Gerber W. (2009). "Elisabeth Hering-vor 100 Jahren geboren" [Elisabeth Hering – born 100 years ago]. Verband der Siebenbürger Sachsen in Deutschland e.V. (in German). Siebenbuerger.de.
- Bernet, C. (2007). Hering, Elisabeth // Biographisch-Bibliographisches Kirchenlexikon [Hering, Elisabeth // Biographical Church Encyclopedia] (in German). Nordhausen: Bautz, 2007. — Bd. 28. — S. 796—799. —. pp. 796–799. ISBN 978-3-88309-413-7.
- Gerber, W. (2016). "Hering, Elisabeth (geborene Leicht)-Leipziger Frauenporträts" [Hering, Elisabeth (née Leicht)-Portraits of women in Leipzig] (in German). Stadt Leipzig.
- Schäfer, U. (2019). Lebenshunger und Wissensdurst: Die Schriftstellerin Elisabeth Hering [A hunger for life and a thirst for knowledge: the writer Elisabeth Hering] (in German). Leipzig: Buchfunk Verlag. p. 534. ISBN 978-3-86847-557-9.
- Petrovsky, N. S. (1992). "Послесловие". Херинг Э. Служанка фараонов. Ваятель фараона: романы [Hering E. Pharaohs' maid. Pharaoh's sculptor: novels]. Ряд исторических романов (in Russian). Translated by Matveeva G. A., Rabinovich M. B. Ставрополь: Кавказский край. pp. 354–364. ISBN 5-86722-059-1.
