= Hans Peter Hansen =

Danish xylographer

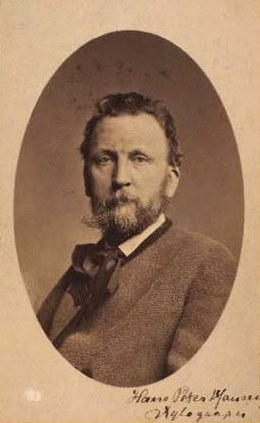
H.P. Hansen's portrait with his signature. Photo by Peter Most.

Hans Peter Hansen (20 December 1829 – 18 November 1899) was a Danish xylographer who specialized in portraits.

Hansen was born in Copenhagen. He first learned the profession of watchmaking before studying woodcutting under Hans Christian Henneberg, Johann Adolf Kittendorff, and Johan Peter Aagaard. At the same time, he also followed courses at the Academy of Arts of Copenhagen (1843/44).

In 1854, he travelled to Germany, first to Dresden and then to Leipzig, where he settled. In 1859, he married Clara Aurelia Sophie Langer (5 August 1830 – 1 July 1913), the daughter of the engraver Georg Gottfried Langer and sister of engraver Karl Hermann Theodor Langer (17 December 1819 – 1895).

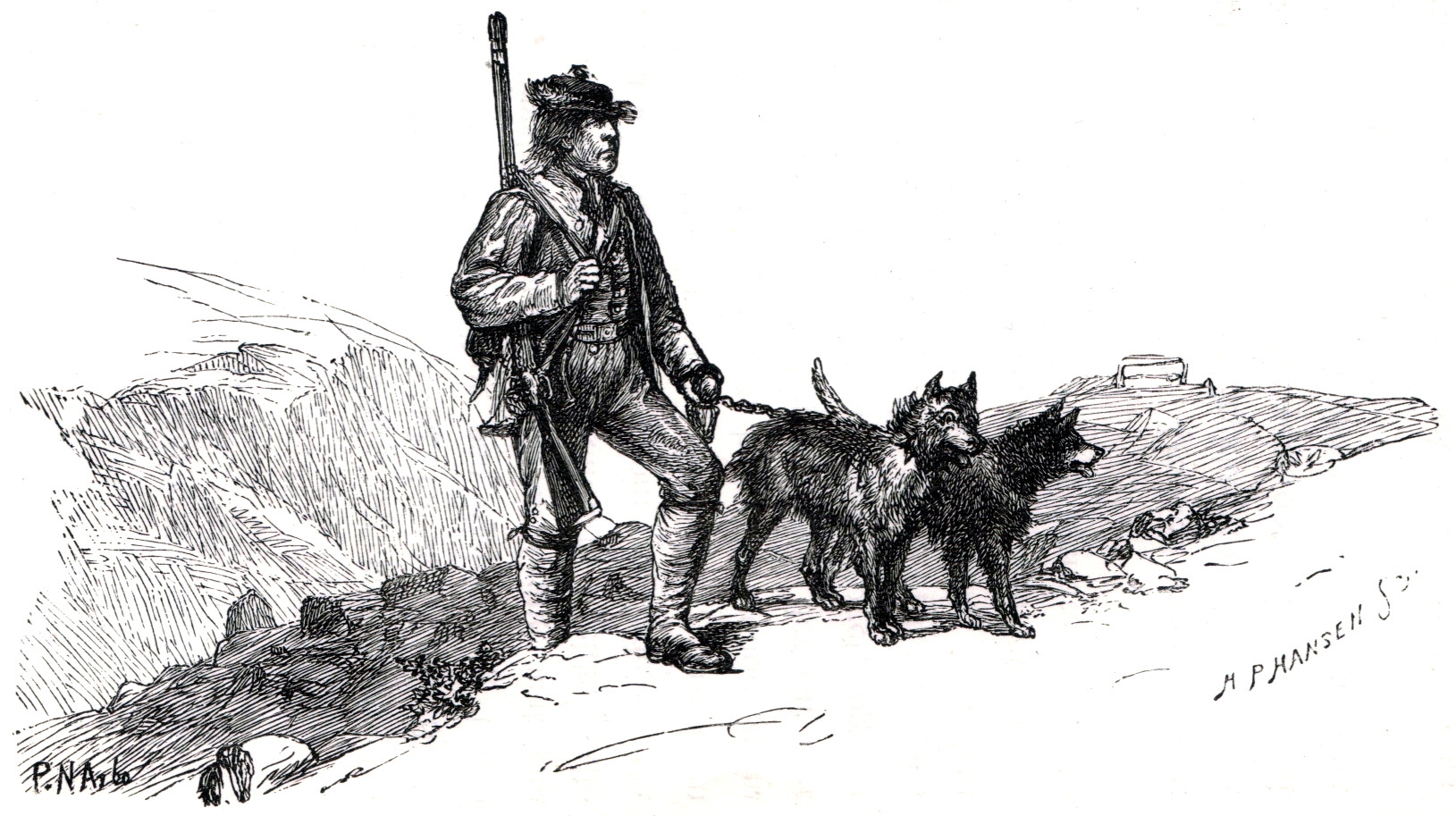
Per Gynt hunting in the Norwegian mountains. Xylography by H.P. Hansen after a drawing by Peter Nicolai Arbo for Peter Christen Asbjørnsen's Norske Folke- og Huldre-Eventyr i Udvalg . Kbh. 1879.

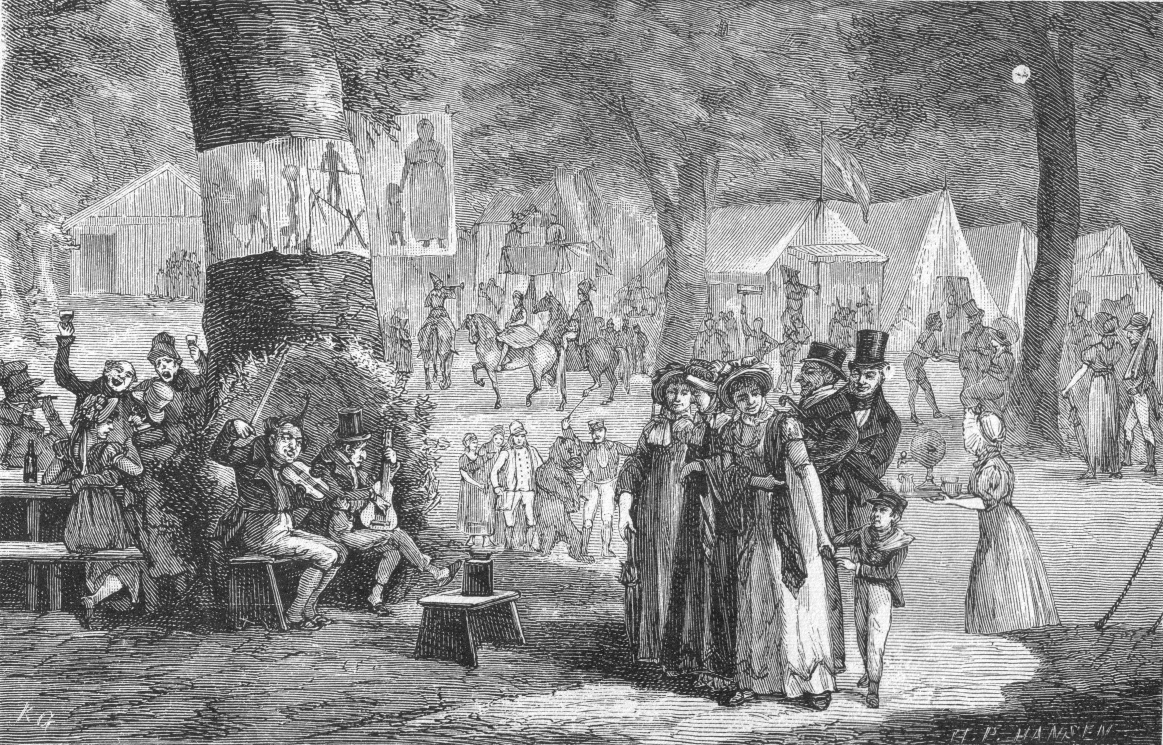
The Jews under a tree at Dyrehavsbakken in Copenhagen. Xylography by H.P. Hansen for Illustreret Tidende No. 1108, 19. December 1880, p. 157.

In 1864, he returned to Copenhagen, where he worked for several illustrated magazines and newspapers, such as Illustreret Tidende and Ude og Hjemme. He also illustrated books, amongst them Nyere Dansk Malerkunst (Sigurd Müller, 1884) and the children books printed by Richardt's and Rode's.
