= Hanna Klose-Greger =

German painter (1892–1973)

Hanna Klose-Greger (born 9 May 1892 in Hochweitzschen – 14 January 1974 in Karl-Marx-Stadt) was a German painter, graphic artist and writer.

== Life and work ==
Klose-Greger studied painting and graphic art at the Kunstgewerbeschule Dresden from 1908 to 1911. She then traveled at home and abroad. For her artistic work, she made studies in the Zwickauer mining district.

She lived for many years in Chemnitz (Karl-Marx-Stadt) at Kassbergstrasse 40, a house that was destroyed by bombs in 1945. Hanna Klose-Greger wrote numerous historical novels based on her precise knowledge of historical events, some of which she illustrated and decorated with her own book covers and dust jackets. She also created commercial graphic works such as posters and postcards, including the award-winning official festive map for the inauguration of Chemnitz town hall in 1911. She also created designs for interior decorations. The magazine "Innendekoration" published her design for a children's play corner in the "Spielwinkel" apartment in 1916.

Klose-Greger was a member of the Deutschen Werkbund (DWB), as well as the Chemnitzer Künstlerkreis and the Reichsverband bildender Künstler Deutschlands. She was one of the artists ostracized by the Nazis as degenerate. In 1937, her lithograph "The Scholar" was confiscated from the Kunsthütte Chemnitz and destroyed as part of the "Degenerate Art" campaign.

== Works as a writer ==
- Hab mich lieb. Thüringer Verlagsanstalt, Abteilung Frieses Verlag, Chemnitz, 1914 (with own illustrations)
- Der Silberne Bergmann, 1935
- Die Wunderblume, 1935
- Barbara Uttmann. Hase & Köhler, Leipzig, 1940
- Die Kutsche ohne Pferde und andere Erfinderschicksale, 1956
- Inka, Sohn der Sonne. Prisma-Verlag, Leipzig, 1958
- Lard, the Etruscan. Prisma-Verlag, Leipzig, 1959
- Insel der heiligen Stiere. Prisma-Verlag, Leipzig, 1957
- Roswitha von Gandersheim. Union-Verlag, Berlin, 1961
- Käthe Kollwitz. A life portrait for the youth. Altberliner Verlag Lucie Groszer, Berlin, 1962
- Die Sibylle vom Libanon. Union-Verlag, Berlin, 1963
- Kommst du wieder Federschlange? Prisma-Verlag, Leipzig, 1966
- Die Stadt der Elefanten. Prisma-Verlag, Leipzig, 1972

== Exhibitions ==
- 1914: Chemnitz, Kunsthütte (group exhibition)
- 1923 or 1924: Chemnitz, Galerie Gerstenberger
- 1946: Chemnitz, Kaufstätte Merkur ("Chemnitzer Künstler stellen aus")

== Postum ==
- 1977: Karl-Marx-Stadt, Galerie Oben ("art femina"; with Elisabeth Ahnert, Irene Bösch, Gerti (Gertrud) Hartmann, Erika Klier, Elisabet Schettler, Dagmar Ranft-Schinke and Martha Schrag)
- 1992: Chemnitz, Neue Chemnitzer Kunsthütte

== Literature ==
- Klose-Greger, Hanna. In: Lexikon deutschsprachiger Schriftsteller von den Anfängen bis zur Gegenwart. VEB Verlag Enzyklopädie, Leipzig, 1974, Vol. 1, p. 475
- Klose-Greger, Hanna. In: Hans Vollmer (Hrsg.): Allgemeines Lexikon der bildenden Künstler des XX. Jahrhunderts. Band 3: K–P. E. A. Seemann, Leipzig 1956, S. 66 (Textarchiv – Internet Archive – Leseprobe).
