= Portrait of the Sculptor Jens Adolf Jerichau, the Artist's Husband =

1846 painting by Jens Adolf Jerichau

- Billedhuggeren Jens Adolf Jerichau, kunstnerens ægtefælle (Danish)
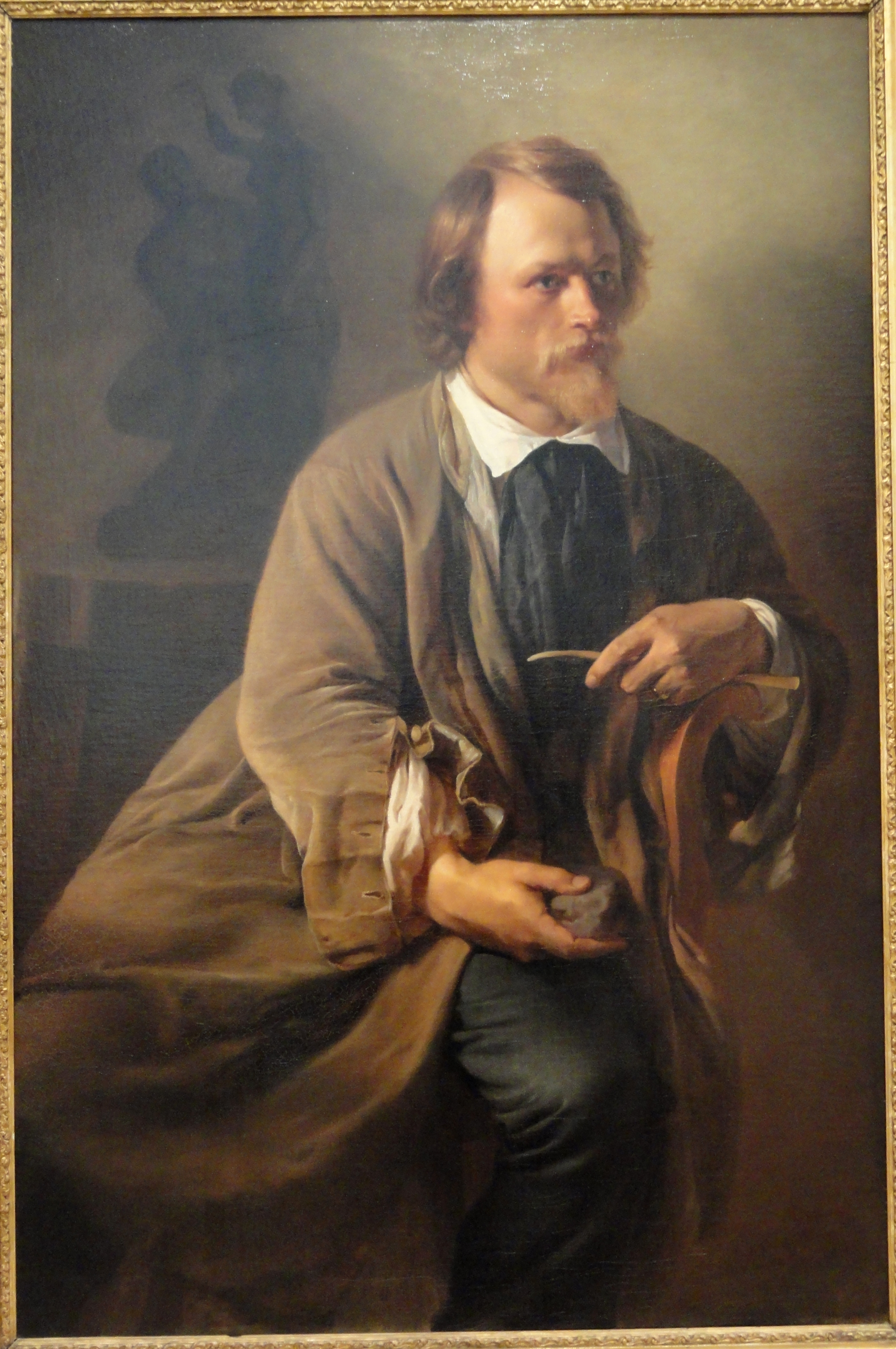
- Artist: Elisabeth Jerichau-Baumann
- Year: 1846
- Medium: oil on canvas
- Dimensions: 142 cm × 95 cm (56 in × 37 in)
- Location: National Gallery of Denmark

Portrait of the Sculptor Jens Adolf Jerichau, the Artist's Husband is a portrait of the Danish sculptor Jens Adolf Jerichau painted in 1846 by Elisabeth Jerichau-Baumann, the same year they married.

== Artist ==
Elisabeth Jerichau Baumann was a German-speaking, German-educated female artist. When in 1848, she came to Copenhagen she had a lot to overcome. She was characterized as an outsider and was not well received in Danish culture, which was more concerned with the continuation of the legacy of the Danish Golden Age as expressed by C. W. Eckersberg and N.L. Høyen.

The portrait was painted in 1846, the same year that Baumann and Jerichau married.

== Description ==
The portrait shows Jerichau sitting and looking slightly off to the side rather than directly at the viewer. The focus is on the sculptor's hands, the creative hands. In the left hand Jerichau carries an engagement ring and in the right hand he holds some material probably from the sculpture in the background, a sketch for a breakthrough work of Hercules and Hebe from 1845. The artist shows her husband's mastery of the sculptor tradition.

== Provenance ==
The painting was given as a gift to the National Gallery of Denmark by brewer JC Jacobsen in 1876 and received after the artist's death in 1881.

== Sources ==
- Max Bendixen, Verdensdamen Elisabeth Jerichau-Baumann, ISBN 978-87-7081-031-9
- Nicolaj Bøgh: Elisabeth Jerichau Baumann, 1886
