= Italian Inn =

Painting by Elisabeth Jerichau-Baumann

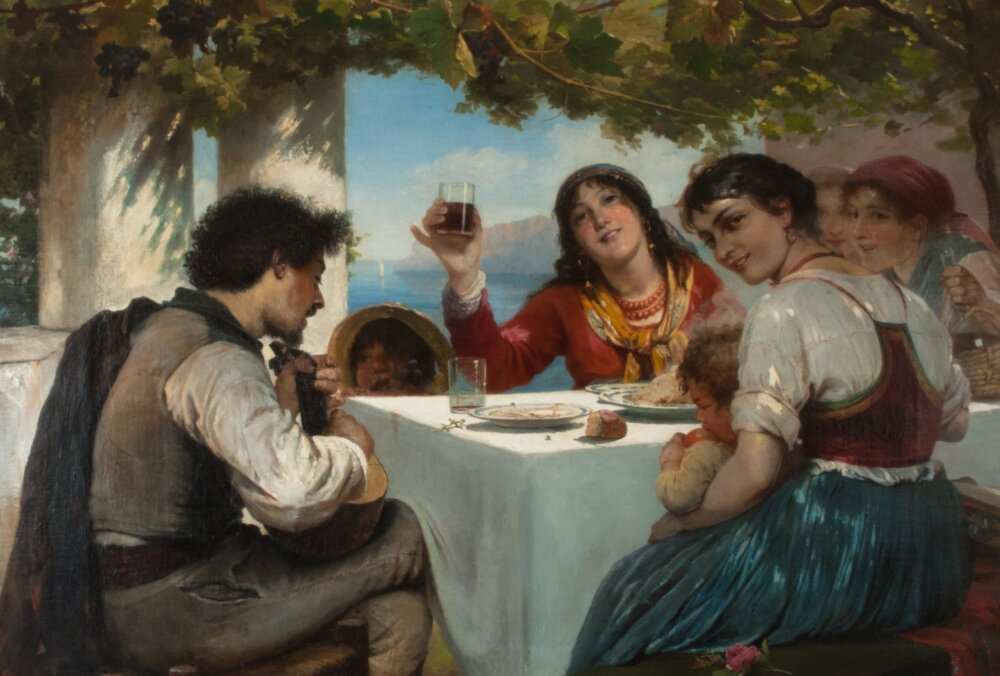
- Artist: Elisabeth Jerichau-Baumann
- Year: between 1838 and 1881
- Medium: Oil on canvas
- Subject: Five People and a child enjoying a meal at an osteria
- Dimensions: 22 × 172 cm
- Location: Stockholm

Italian Inn is an oil painting by Polish-Danish painter Elisabeth Jerichau-Baumann (1819–1881). The painting depicts a group of people eating and drinking. The painting is on display at the Nationalmuseum in Stockholm, Sweden.
