= Mermaid (Jerichau-Baumann) =

1873 painting by Elisabeth Jerichau-Baumann

- Havfrue (Danish)
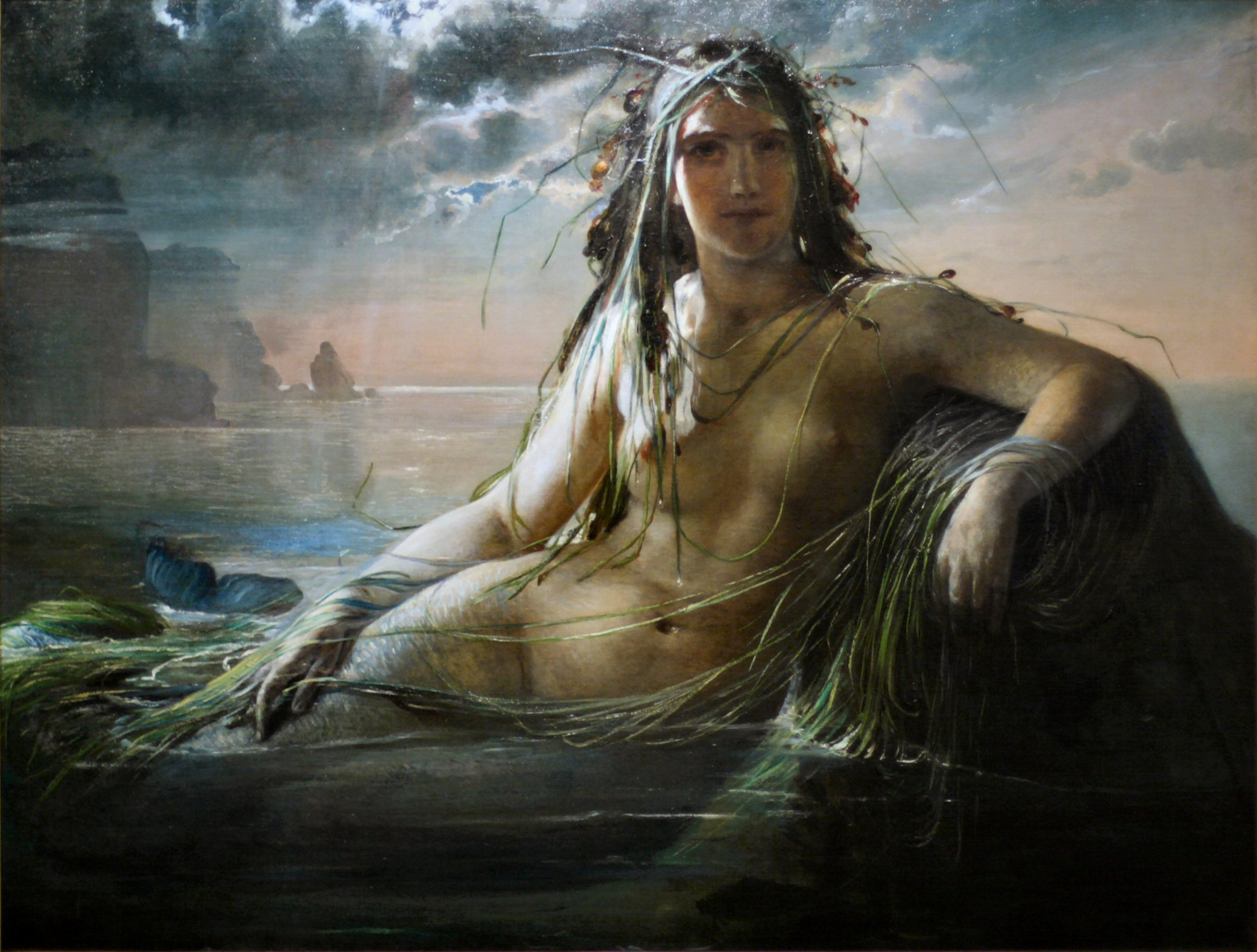
- Artist: Elisabeth Jerichau-Baumann
- Year: 1873
- Medium: oil on canvas
- Dimensions: 96 cm × 128 cm (38 in × 50 in)
- Location: Ny Carlsberg Glyptotek, Copenhagen

Mermaid (Danish: (En) Havfrue), painted in 1873, is the last of at least four oil on canvas paintings of mermaids painted by the Polish-Danish painter Elisabeth Jerichau-Baumann. It depicts a mermaid with a melancholic facial expression, leaning against a rock in shallow water, with a night sky residing over a moonlit sea in the background. Purchased by Carl Jacobsen in 1877, it is now in the collection of the Ny Carlsberg Glyptotek. One of Baumann-Jerichau's earlier mermaid paintings was presented to Hans Christian Andersen as a birthday present and is now in Funen's Art Museuma. The two other mermaid paintings are in private collections.

== Artist's background ==
Elisabeth Baumann was educated at the art academy in Düsseldorf in 1838–1845. She then went on a study trip to Rome, where she met the Danish sculptor Jens Adolf Jerichau. They immediately fell in love, were married in 1846, and lived in Rome until the birth of their first two children in 1847 and 1848. The revolution in 1848 prompted first Elisabeth and then her husband to move to Denmark.

The inspiration for the mermaid paintings came partly from the mermaid in the coat of arms of her home town Warsaw and partly from Hans Christian Andersen's 1837 short story The Little Mermaid. The Jerichaus first met Andersen in Rome and maintained a close friendship with him which lasted the rest of their lives. Andersen was the godfather of their daughter Caroline Elisabeth Nancy, later mostly known as Agnete (or TiTi), probably inspired by the folk tale Agnethe and the Merman, who was born in 1853. In 1856, Jerichau-Baumann painted a watercolour of Agnethe and the Merman as an illustration of the Danish folk song.

Jens Adolf Jerichau created a small clay model of a mermaid in a pose rather similar to that of the mermaids in his wife's paintings, but since it is undated, it is impossible to determine who was inspired by whom.

== History ==
=== Baumann's earlier mermaid paintings ===
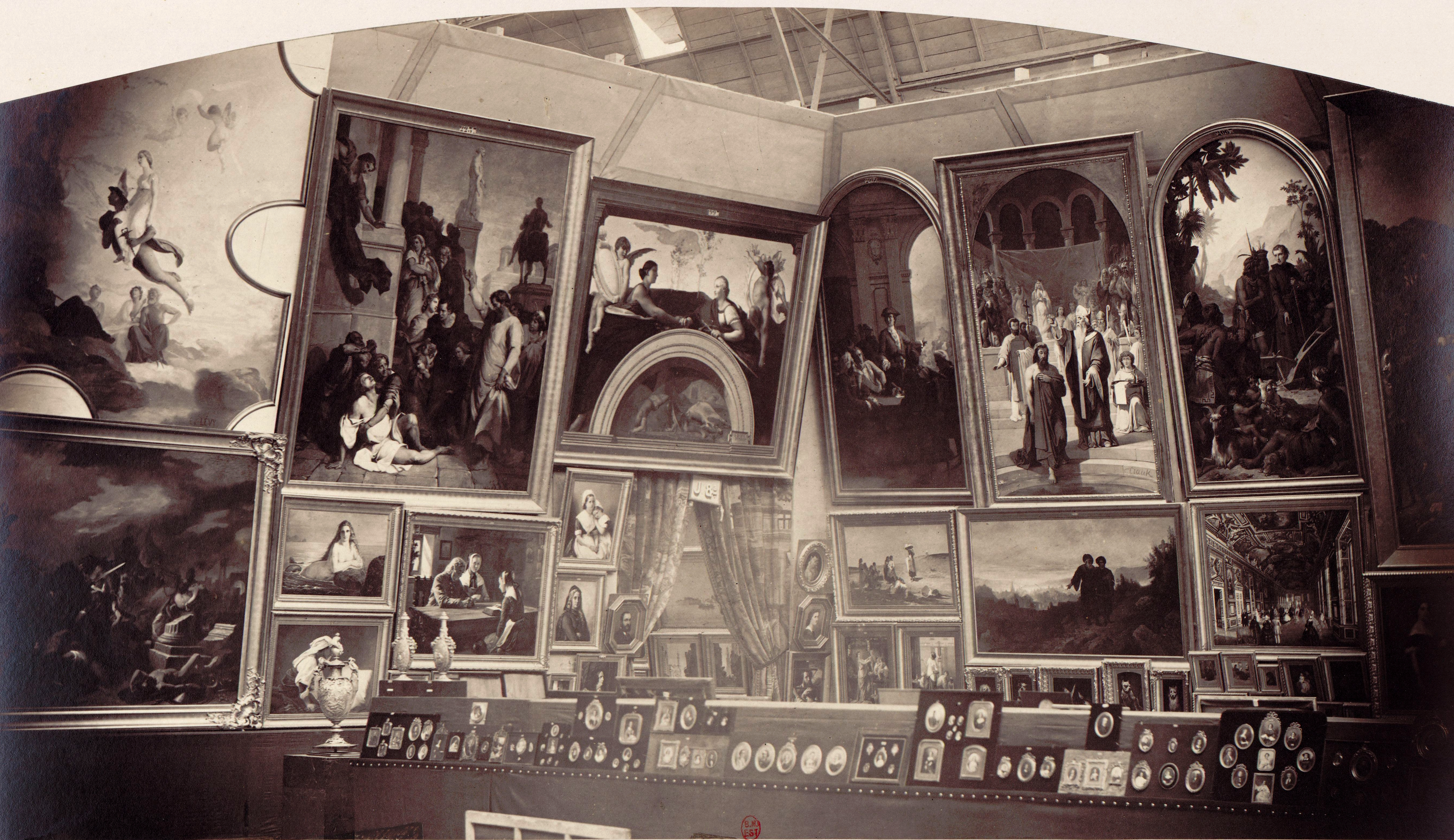
The Mermaid of the North exhibited in the Paris Salon of 1861 (bottom left).

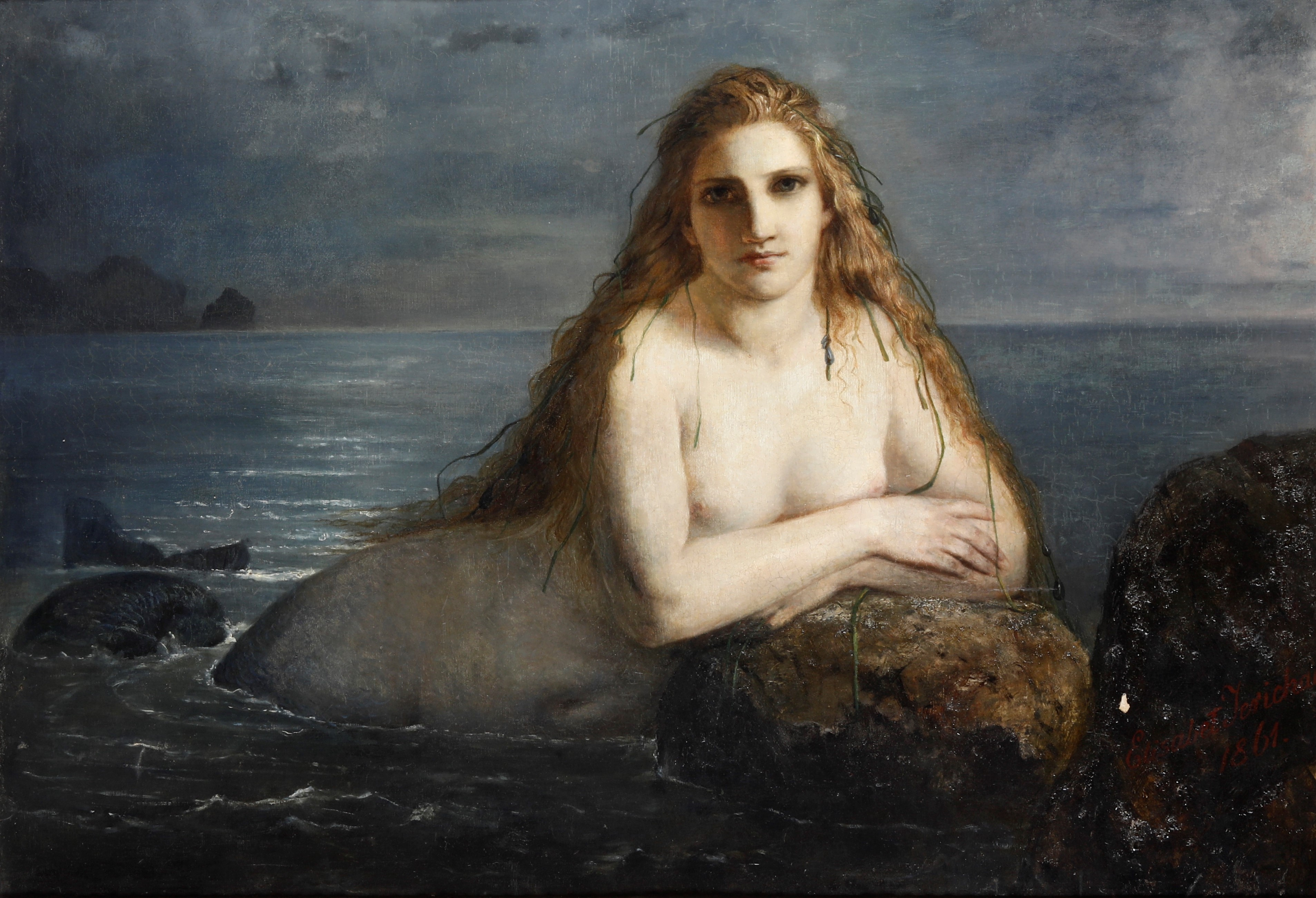
The 1861 version.

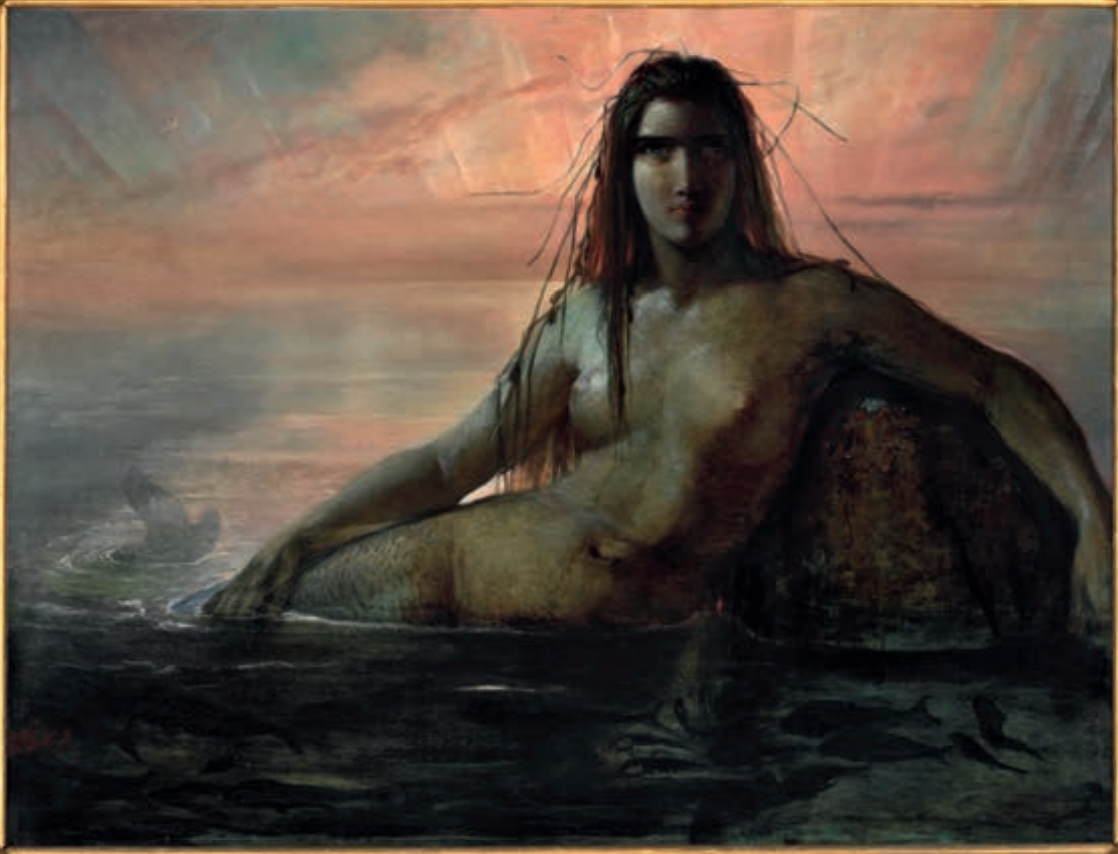
Another version.

An oil on canvas painting by Jerichau Baumann exhibited at the Salon in Paris in the spring of 1861 is believed to be her first painting of a mermaid. A French art critic described it as "a fateful creature, which, due to its attractiveness, would cause the 'Scandinavian Odysseus' to run aground". When the just 19-year-old Wanda Zahrtmann visited Jerichau-Baumann's studio in December the same year, she was immediately struck by the mermaid's gaze. After the death of both her parents, former vice admiral and naval minister Christian Christopher Zahrtmann and Sophie Elisabeth Donner, in 1853 and 1858, respectively, she was given an annual allowance by her trustees which was at her disposal. On 24 December (in Denmark called Christmas Eve Day), she decided to buy the painting for 1,200 rigsdaler. In a letter to Jerichau-Baumann sent earlier the same day, she had described how she kept dreaming of the mermaid, both while asleep and awake, but how buying the painting would mean that she spent her entire annual allowance all at once. In a letter to Henriette Scavenius, Hans Christian Andersen commented on the sale and that he found the price rather high. The painting was a few months later presented to the public at the annual Charlottenborg Spring Exhibition. Zahrtmann was married to Christian Conrad, Count Danneskiold-Samsøe the following year.

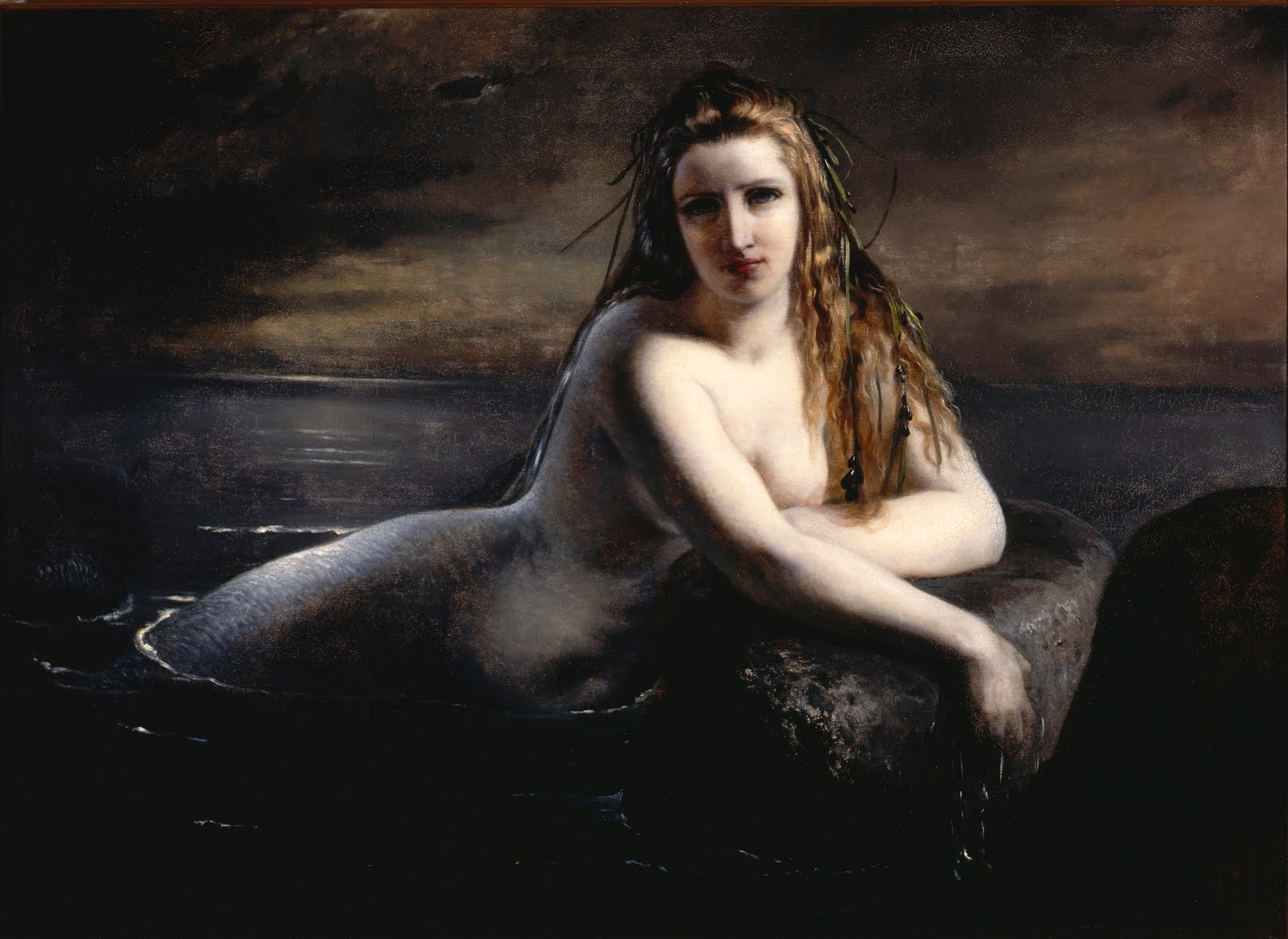
The 1863 mermaid.

Another mermaid painting was completed in June 1862. Baumann brought it with her to London for exhibition at the World's Fair. Baumann hoped that the Shah of Persia, whom she met at an event in Buckingham Palace, would be interested in the painting, but in her memoirs she comments that "he passed me without even seeing me, I guess I wasn't young enough to attract his attention". The painting was for sale for £200 (1800 rigsdaler) but failed to find a buyer. In a registry from 1883, Jerichau-Baumann's mermaid painting of 1861 is recorded as belonging to Countess V. Danneskjold-Samsøe.

On 2 April 1868, Baumann gave one of her mermaid paintings to Hans Christian Andersen as a birthday present. Andersen thanked her with a small poem in an undated letter:

You master the splendour of colours!
A soul you have placed in the mermaid’s eyes:
A wink from you, from the spirit’s power!
My gratitude here expressed in mere words

One of Jerichau-Baumann's mermaid paintings (97×130 cm) belonged to baroness Sophie Lerche.

=== Baumann's 1873 mermaid painting ===
Jerichau-Baumann painted her last mermaid painting in 1873. It was exhibited in Vienna the same year. In September 1877, Carl Jacobsen purchased the painting directly from Baumann for DKK 3,000.

When Jacobsen commissioned the statue of the Little Mermaid from Edvard Eriksen, he stated that "Hans Christian Andersen had created the Little Mermaid in literature, Fini Henriques has created her in music, Mrs. Jerichau has created her in painting [….] now I want you to create her in sculpture".

== Description ==
Baumann's 1873 mermaid painting depicts a mermaid with a somewhat melancholic facial expression and seaweed in her hair, leaning against a rock in shallow water, with a night sky residing over a moonlit sea in the background. The art historian Sine Krogh has observed that "Andersen’s very young and innocent mermaid sacrificed her life for the earthly prince, whose love she could not win, Jerichau Baumann’s mermaids seem less selfless or sacrificial. Instead, they appear more self-conscious and alluring as they lie rocking near the surface of the sea, treacherously covering the reef that could cause ships to run aground".

== Reception ==
Baumann's mermaid painting was poorly received by contemporary art critics. Lucie Ingemann, the widow of B.S. Ingemann and herself a painter, expressed her strong fascination with the gaze of Jerichau-Baumann's mermaids.

== Ownership and recent exhibitions ==
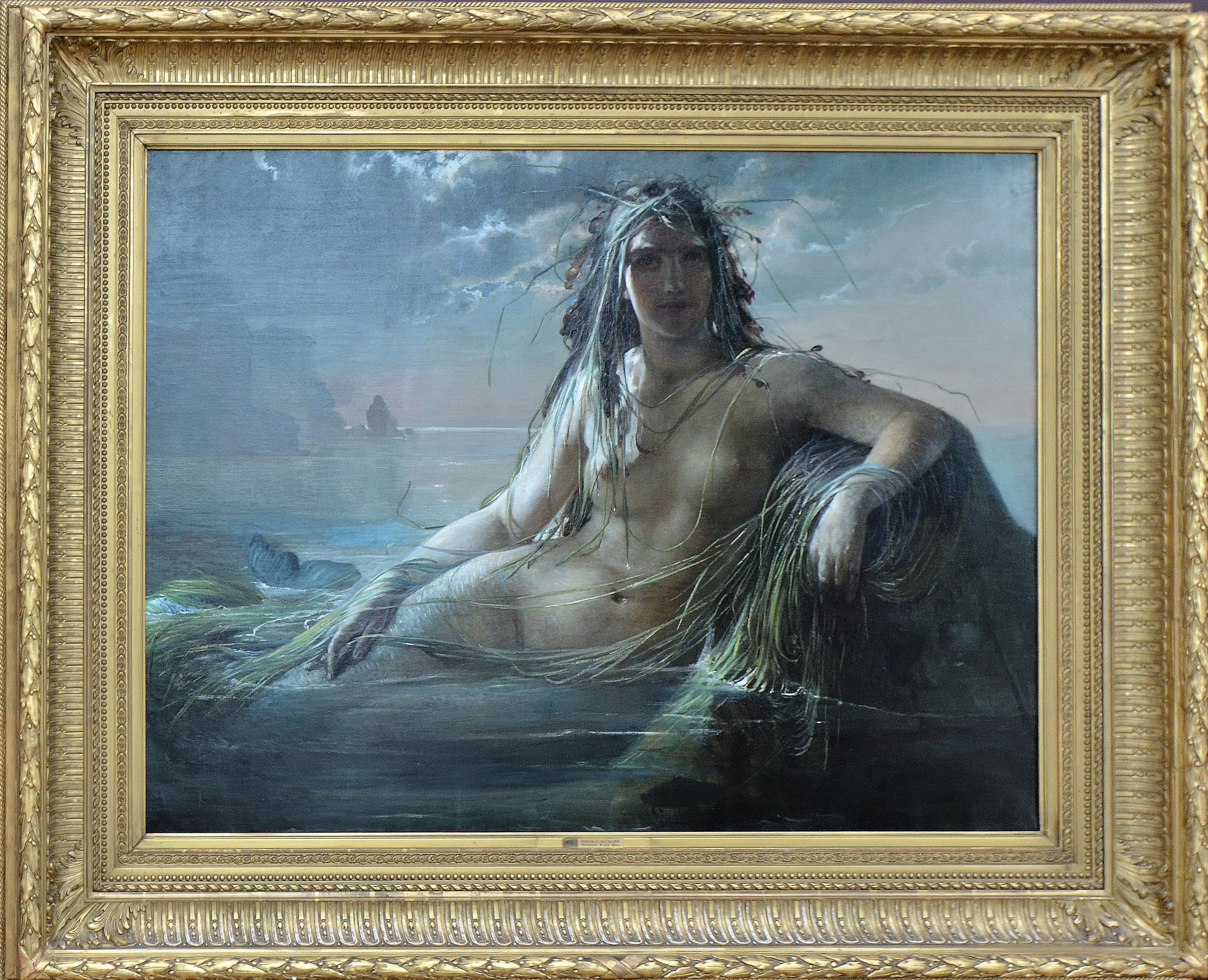
The 1873 mermaid painting on display in the Musée d'art moderne André-Malraux.

Baumann's 1873 mermaid painting is in the collection of the Ny Carlsberg Glyptotek. It was presented as a gift by Johanna Jerichau in 1972. In 2018, it was loaned out for the exhibition "Né(e)s de l'écume et des rêves" – "Une Sirène" at the Musée d'art moderne André-Malraux in Le Havre.

Hans Christian Andersen's mermaid painting (905 × 135 cm) is now in the collection of the Funen Art Museum.

Wanda Zahrtmann's mermaid painting (98 x 129 cm) remained in the family until 1986. In December 2020, it was sold by Bruun Rasmussen auctioneers (Lot No.75). The painting was featured on the cover of the auction catalogue. Sophie Lerche's mermaid painting (97 × 130 cm) is now in a private collection abroad.

== In popular culture ==
A detail of the painting is seen on the cover of Birgit Pouplier's 2007 biographical novel about Jerichau-Baumann.

== See also ==
- Mermaid (Carl-Nielsen)
