= Elisabeth Ahnert =

German painter (1885-1966)

- Born: October 4, 1885; Chemnitz, Germany
- Died: September 3, 1966 (aged 80); Ehrenfriedersdorf, Germany
- Known for: Painting

Elisabeth Ahnert (1885-1966) was a German painter.

Ahnert was born on October 4, 1885 in Chemnitz. She studied at the Frauen die Kunstgewerbeschule in Dresden. She married fellow artist Arthur Ahnert (1885-1927) in 1912. Ahnert died on September 3, 1966 in Ehrenfriedersdorf.

In 2011 the Leonhardi Museum in Dresden held an exhibition of her work.
