= Georg Ebers =

German Egyptologist (1837–1898)

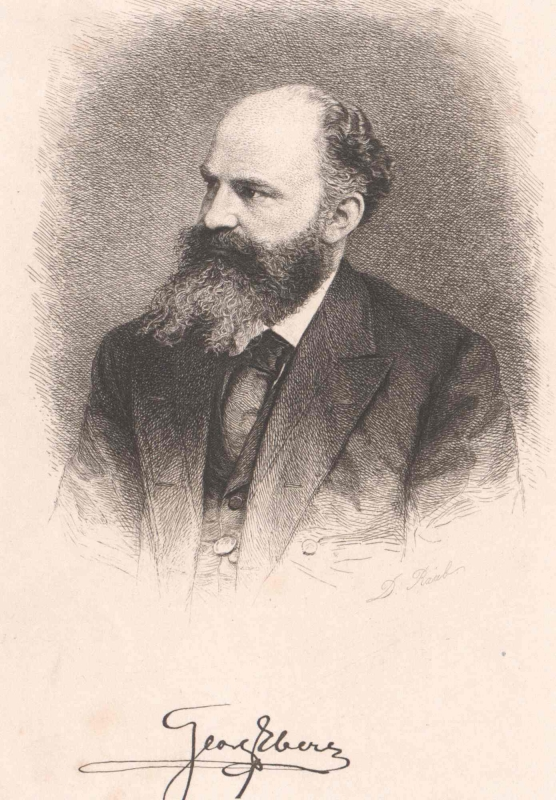
Georg Ebers

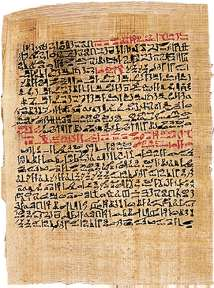
The Ebers Papyrus

Georg Moritz Ebers (1 March 1837 – 7 August 1898) was a German Egyptologist and novelist. He is best known for his purchase of the Ebers Papyrus, one of the oldest Egyptian medical documents in the world.

== Life ==
Georg Ebers was born in Berlin and was the youngest of the five children of an affluent family of bankers and porcelain manufacturers. The Ebers children were raised by their mother on her own, after their father committed suicide shortly after Ebers was born. His mother ran a salon popular among members of the intelligentsia, which included Georg Wilhelm Friedrich Hegel, the Grimm Brothers, and Alexander von Humboldt.

At Göttingen, Ebers studied jurisprudence, and at Berlin Oriental languages and archaeology. Having made a special study of Egyptology, he became in 1865 Dozent in Egyptian language and antiquities at Jena, becoming a professor in 1868. In 1870 he was appointed professor in these subjects at Leipzig. He had made two scientific journeys to Egypt, and his first work of importance, Ägypten und die Bücher Moses, appeared in 1867–1868. In 1874 he edited the celebrated medical papyrus (Papyrus Ebers), which he had discovered in Thebes (translation by H. Joachim, 1890).

Ebers early conceived the idea of popularising Egyptian lore by means of historical romances. Eine ägyptische Königstochter (An Egyptian Princess) was published in 1864 and obtained great success. His subsequent works of the same kind—Uarda (1877), Homo sum (1878), Die Schwestern (1880), Der Kaiser (1881), of which the scene is laid in Egypt at the time of Hadrian, Serapis (1885), Die Nilbraut (1887), and Kleopatra (1894)—were also well received and did much to make the public familiar with the discoveries of Egyptologists. Ebers also turned his attention to other fields of historical fiction—especially the 16th century (Die Frau Bürgermeisterin, 1882; Die Gred, 1887)—without, however, attaining the success of his Egyptian novels.

Ebers discovered the Ebers Papyrus (ca. 1550 BCE) at Luxor (Thebes) in the winter of 1873–74. Now in the Leipzig University Library, the Ebers Papyrus is among the most important ancient Egyptian medical papyri. It is one of two of the oldest preserved medical documents anywhere—the other being the Edwin Smith Papyrus (ca. 1600 BCE). The Ebers Papyrus mentions more than 700 substances and medical recipes that include incantations and concoctions. Ebers published it as a facsimile with an English-Latin vocabulary and introduction.

His other writings include a descriptive work on Egypt (Aegypten in Wort und Bild, 2nd ed., 1880); Palestine in Picture and Word (Palästina in Bild und Word), an 1884 translation of the English series Picturesque Palestine, Sinai, and Egypt; a life (1885) of his old teacher, the Egyptologist Karl Richard Lepsius; and a guide to Egypt (1886). In 1889, the state of his health led him to retire from his chair at Leipzig on a pension.

Ebers's Collected Works appeared in 25 volumes at Stuttgart (1893–1895). Many of his books have been translated into English. For his life, see his Die Geschichte meines Lebens (Stuttgart, 1893); also R. Gosche, G. Ebers, der Forscher und Dichter (2nd ed., Leipzig, 1887).

Ebers was elected an International Member of the American Philosophical Society in 1895.

Arachne, which was published on 7 August 1898, was Ebers' last novel. It was written at the Villa Ebers in Tutzing, near Munich.

== Works ==
Scholarship

- Ägypten und die Bücher Moses (1867–1868) [transl. as Egypt and the Book of Moses] (Editor)
- Egypt: Descriptive, Historical, and Picturesque (1879)
- Aegypten in Wort und Bild, 2nd ed., 1880)
- Palestine in Picture and Word (Palästina in Bild und Word), an 1884 translation of the English series Picturesque Palestine, Sinai, and Egypt
- Richard Lepsius, ein Lebensbild (1885) [transl. as Richard Lepsius: A Biography (1887)]
- Lorenz Alma Tadema: His Life and Works (1886) [transl. Mary J. Safford, 1834–1891]

Fiction - Egyptian

- Eine ägyptische Königstochter (1864) [An Egyptian Princess, transl. by Eleanor Grove] - Ebers' first novel
- Uarda: Roman aus dem alten Aegypten (1877) [Uarda: A Romance of Ancient Egypt, transl. by Clara Bell]
- Homo sum (1878) [transl. by Clara Bell] - a novella about 4th century A.D. Christianity on the Sinai peninsula
- Die Schwestern (1880) [The Sisters, transl. by Clara Bell]
- Der Kaiser (1881) [The Emperor, transl. by Clara Bell] (Hadrian)
- Serapis, a Romance (1885) - a novel on the destruction of the Library of Alexandria
- Die Nilbraut (1887) [The Bride of the Nile]
- Kleopatra (1894) [Cleopatra]
- Arachne (1898) (transl. by Mary J. Safford]
- A Thorny Path (Per Aspera) (1892) [transl. by Clara Bell]

Fiction - non-Egyptian

- Die Frau Bürgermeisterin (1882) [transl. by Mary J. Safford as The Burgomaster's Wife; a Tale of the Siege of Leyden]
- Die Gred (1887) [transl. by Clara Bell as Margery: A Tale of Old Nuremberg]
- Barbara Blomberg: A Historical Romance
- In the Blue Pike (Germany)
- Ein Wort [A Word, Only a Word, transl. Mary J. Safford] ("Black Forest in the 16th century. Gives terrible pictures of the persecutions and sufferings of the Jews."

Additional fiction

- Eine Frage. Idyll zu einem Gemälde seines Freundes Alma Tadema [transl. A Question. The Idyll of a Picture by his Friend Alma Tadema by Mary J. Safford]
- Joshua: A Story of Biblical Times (1890)
- In the Fire of the Forge: A Romance of Old Nuremberg [transl. by Mary J. Safford]
- Elixir, and Other Tales (fairy tales)
- In the Desert (1900) [transl. by Mary J. Safford]
- Elifen: A Dream of the Desert (verse)

Short fiction

- The Greylock: A Fairy Tale
- The Nuts

Memoir

- Die Geschichte meines Lebens [The Story of My Life from Childhood to Manhood] (Stuttgart, 1893)

Collected works

- Collected Works appeared in 25 volumes at Stuttgart (1893–1895)

== See also ==
- List of Egyptologists
- Elisabeth Hering
