= Sigurd Müller (wine trader) =

Danish businessperson

Sigurd Müller (27 December 1904 – 20 March 1997) was a Danish businessperson in the wine trade.

He was born in Ålborg as a son of wine trader Magnus Müller (1870–1950) and Marie, née Bendtzen (1877–1954). His father owned the import firm P. Weile og Søn, where Sigurd Müller became co-owner in 1926 and sole owner in 1949. After acquiring several firms, Møller sold his assets to Peter F. Heering in 1975. Müller then started a special import firm, moving from the manager position to chairman of the board in 1981, and lastly member of the board from 1986 to 1991. He chaired the Danish Wine Traders' Association from 1949 to 1987, and was a consul for Spain from 1940 to 1988. Müller also held several other business and charity posts, among others being a board member of Frihedsfonden from 1951 to 1970 and president of Det Danske Gastronomiske Akademi from 1974 to 1984, His books as a wine and food writer include En lille bog om store glæder (1979) and Din egen vinkælder (1984); he also wrote the memoirs 1904 - en god aargang (1991). Müller was decorated with a royal order in 1950.
