= Sigurd Müller (writer) =

Danish writer

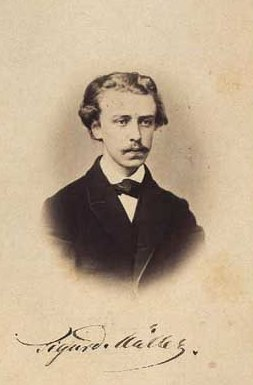
Sigurd Müller in the 1860s.

Sigurd Hjorth Müller (21 December 1844 – 2 December 1918) was a Danish educator and writer.

He was born in Snedsted. Following his education, he was a teacher, worked for Dagbladet and Morgenbladet, and was a headmaster in Kolding from 1886 to 1901.

He was also a translator, public lecturer, poet, textbook writer, encyclopedic contributor, literary historian and art critic. He was the father of Paul Læssøe Müller.
