= List of television stations in Sweden =

This is a list of television channels that broadcast in Sweden.

Channels holding a broadcasting license for the terrestrial network are marked "(DTT)."

== Public non-commercial networks ==
=== SVT ===
- SVT1 (Sveriges TV1) (general) (DTT)
- SVT2 (Sveriges TV2) (general) (DTT)
- SVT24 (Sveriges TV24) (news, sports, reruns) (DTT)
- SVT Barn (children) (DTT)
- Kunskapskanalen (educational) (DTT)

The public television channels are mostly funded by a license fee and broadcast free-to-air.

SVT has 21 local news districts.

== Swedish private commercial networks ==
These are privately owned television channels that are solely, or almost solely, directed at Sweden. Many such channels don't broadcast from Sweden, but nevertheless target a Swedish audience.

TV4 is the only commercial channel ever to have broadcast nationally in the Swedish analogue terrestrial network, but the arrival of digital terrestrial television saw the TV4 monopoly on commercial television broken.

=== TV4 AB ===
- TV4 (general entertainment) (HD)
- Sjuan (general entertainment)
- TV12 (HD)
- TV4 Film (movies)
- TV4 Fakta (documentaries)
- TV4 Guld ("classic" programming)
- Köket TV ("gastronomy" programming)

=== Viaplay Group ===
- TV3 (general entertainment) (HD)
- TV6 (entertainment) (HD)
- TV8 (entertainment)
- TV10 (sport and documentaries)
- Viaplay Sport
- V Sport 1 (HD)
- V Sport Football (HD)
- V Sport Vinter

=== Skydance Nordics ===
- Kanal 5 (entertainment) (HD)
- Kanal 9 (entertainment) (HD)
- Kanal 11 (entertainment, formerly TV400)
- Discovery Channel Sweden (documentaries)
- TLC Sweden (lifestyle)
- MTV Europe (music/entertainment)
- Nickelodeon Sweden (children)
- Nick Jr.
- Nicktoons

=== Other ===
- Axess TV (culture and information) - owned by Axel and Margaret Johnson Foundation for Public Benefit Purposes

Regional terrestrial channels:

- Kanal 12
- Kanal 10 a.k.a. 'Kristen TV i Sverige', a privately owned Christian TV channel in Sweden, was founded in 2003 by Börje Claesson. The channel focuses on Christian content and broadcasts a variety of religious programs aimed at a Swedish audience. On October 25, 2024, a significant change in the ownership of Kanal 10, Sweden's largest Christian TV channel, was announced. The newly established non-profit organization Christian Media Sweden has taken control of Kanal 10 Media AB from Börje Claesson. The new operational management of the business will be handled by: Anders Wisth (interim operations manager), Tommy Claesson, Joakim Claesson

== Pan-Nordic channels ==
These channels mostly target the Nordic countries. Most channels carry subtitles and/or audio in Swedish.

=== Viaplay Group ===
- V Classics (HD)
- V Crime (HD)
- V Film Premiere (movies) (HD)
- V Film Action (HD) - previously known as Cinema
- V Film Hits (HD)
- V Film Family (HD)
- V Series (HD)
- V Sport Golf (HD)
- V Sport Vinter (HD)
- V Sport Live
- V Sport Motor (HD)
- V Sport Ultra (HD)

=== Viasat World ===
- Viasat History (documentaries) (HD)
- Viasat Nature (documentaries) (HD)
- Viasat Explore (documentaries) (HD)

=== TV4 Group ===
- TV4 Hits (HD) (partial)
- TV4 Stars
- TV4 Sportkanalen
- TV4 Fotboll (partial) (HD)
- TV4 Motor
- TV4 Hockey (partial)
- TV4 Tennis
- TV4 Sport Live 1 (partial)
- TV4 Sport Live 2
- TV4 Sport Live 3
- TV4 Sport Live 4
- SF-kanalen

=== Skydance Europe & Africa ===
- Animal Planet Nordic, Swedish subtitles
- Cartoonito (Nordic), Swedish audio
- Cartoon Network Nordic, Swedish audio (partial)
- Eurosport 1, Swedish audio
- Eurosport 2, Swedish audio

=== NBCUniversal International Networks/Skydance Europe & Africa ===
- SkyShowtime 1, Swedish subtitles
- SkyShowtime 2, Swedish subtitles

=== BBC Studios ===
- BBC Nordic, Swedish subtitles

=== Others ===
- CNBC Nordic
- Hope Channel Sverige (religious)
- National Geographic Channel Scandinavia, Swedish subtitles
- History Channel Scandinavia, Swedish subtitles
- LifeStyle TV (religious)
- TV Shop Europe (home shopping)
- Tvins.com (home shopping)

== Pan-European channels ==
These are channels targeting all of Europe. This section may include virtually all channels available from any satellite that can be received in Sweden, but this list mostly concerns encrypted channels that are available from Swedish satellite distributors. Some have Swedish subtitles.

- Da Vinci Kids
- Al Jazeera English
- BBC News
- Bloomberg TV Europe
- Blue Hustler
- CNN International
- Deutsche Welle
- Disney Channel
- Discovery Science Europe, Swedish subtitles
- E!, Swedish subtitles
- EuroNews
- Extreme Sports Channel
- Fashion TV
- France 24
- Fuel TV
- Ginx
- GOD TV
- Hope Channel International
- Horse & Country
- Hustler TV
- Investigation Discovery
- Love Nature
- Mezzo
- Mezzo Live HD
- Moonbug
- MUTV
- Nat Geo Wild (HD)
- Nautical Channel
- Outdoor Channel
- OutTV
- Playboy TV
- SABC News International
- Sky News
- Spice Premium
- Trace Urban
- Travel Channel Europe, Swedish subtitles (HD)
- TV5Monde

== Public access stations ==
- Jönköpings lokal-TV - Jönköping Municipality
- Steve - Lund Municipality
- TV Malmö - Malmö Municipality
- Öppna Kanalen Göteborg - Gothenburg Municipality
- Öppna Kanalen Skövde- Skövde Municipality
- Öppna Kanalen Stockholm - Stockholm Municipality
- Lokal-TV Uddevalla - Uddevalla Municipality & Lysekil Municipality

Cable operators with more than 100 households are required by law to carry extra space for a local cable channel.

The Majority of "Open Channel" Public-access television stations in Sweden are part of the national organisation RÖK.

== Defunct channels ==
- BBC Brit Scandinavia (2015–2023)
- BBC Earth Scandinavia (2015–2023)
- BBC HD Scandinavia (2008–2016)
- BBC Lifestyle Scandinavia (2007–2016)
- Big TV (2006)
- C More First (2004–2023)
- C More Golf
- C More Series (2004–2023)
- C More Sport (2004–2023)
- C More Action
- C More Emotion
- C More Film
- C More Kids
- C More Tennis
- Canal+ Comedy
- Canal+ Drama
- CBS Reality (1999–2026)
- Chelsea TV (2001–2019)
- Comedy Central Sweden (2009–2019)
- Discovery Mix (2002–2007)
- Discovery Travel & Living Europe (1998–2019)
- Discovery World Europe (1998–2019)
- Disney Junior Scandinavia (2006–2024)
- Disney XD Scandinavia (2009–2020)
- DiTV (2005–2008)
- Fan TV
- Fight+ (2006)
- Filmmax (–1995)
- Fox (2014–2020)
- Hallmark Channel (2000–2009)
- Jetix (1998–2009)
- Kanal Global (2001-2015)
- Kanal Lokal Göteborg (2005–2009)
- Kanal Lokal Skåne (2005–2009)
- Kanal Lokal Stockholm (2005–2009)
- Kanal Lokal Östergötland (1995–2009)
- Kiosk
- K-T.V. (1993-1997)
- Med i tv (2001–2005)
- Motorsport.tv
- MTV 80s (2020–2025)
- MTV 90s (2020–2025)
- MTV 00s (2021–2025)
- Club MTV (2008–2025)
- MTV Hits (2014–2025)
- MTV Rocks (2014–2020)
- MTV Live (2018–2025)
- ONE Television (2006–2007)
- Paramount Network (2019–2022)
- RT (2005–2022)
- Rush HD
- SF Succé
- Showtime Scandinavia (2004–2015)
- Silver (2006–2015)
- Sky Entertainment (1997-1999)
- Sportkanalen (1996)
- SuperSport
- Star! Scandinavia (2000–2015)
- SVT Extra (2002-2007)
- SVT HD (2006–2010)
- SVT World (1988-2017)
- Toon Disney (2005–2009)
- TV Plus
- TV Syd (1965-1966)
- TV1000 Cinema (1995–2004)
- TV21 (1993–2000)
- TVG (1994–1997)
- TV4 Fakta XL (2012-2017)
- TV4 Komedi (2006-2017)
- TV4 News (2012-2013)
- TV4 Science Fiction (2008-2012)
- TV6 (1994–1998/2002)
- TCM Nordic (1993–2017)
- The Voice TV Sweden (2004–2008)
- TNT (2006–2019)
- VH1 (2001–2021)
- VH1 Classic (2004–2020)
- Viasat 3D (2010-2014)
- Viasat Crime (1994-2015)
- Viasat Sport 2 (2004-2008)
- Viasat Sport 3 (2004-2008)
- Viasat Sport 24 (2005-2007)
- ZTV (1992–2010)

== Distributors ==
Television packages and distributors in Sweden:

Digital terrestrial:
- Teracom
Satellite:
- Allente
Cable and Internet:
- Tele2 (Boxer and Com Hem)
- Allente
- Various local cable distributors
- AB Sappa
- Telia Digital-tv
- FastTV (Disbanded in May 2010)
- Telenor Sverige
- IP Sweden
- AB Sappa

== See also ==
- Television in Sweden
- Lists of television channels
- List of European television stations
