= Telia Digital-tv =

Swedish TV platform

Telia Digital TV is an IPTV distribution platform in Sweden owned by Telia Company. It was launched in January 2005 from a few locations.

In September 2007, Telia announced that the platform had 200,000 subscribers

Previously, Telia owned Com Hem, the largest cable television operator in Sweden, but had to sell it due to competition rules.

== Content ==
The service offers television channels from a number of television broadcasters including Sveriges Television, TV4 AB, SBS Broadcasting Group, Discovery Networks Europe, MTV Networks Europe, Eurosport and NonStop Television. Telia Digital TV also offers Video on Demand services from SF Anytime, Live Networks since September 2005 and TV4 Anytime since June 2007 In March 2008, Telia added Disney Channel On Demand, Discovery Channel On Demand and Animal Planet On Demand to their on demand offerings.

Initially, the channels of Viasat were not included on Telia digital TV as they were only available from their own IPTV platform in collaboration with Bredbandsbolaget. On 23 May 2008, Telia announced an agreement with Viasat that would make six packages of Viasat channels available to Telia customers. It would also make TV3, TV6, TV8 and ZTV available in some of Telia's basic packages The Viasat channels were launched in June 2008 and also included an on demand service In August 2008, SVT Play was added to the platform. Initially, SVT Play on Telia offers newscasts and Olympic broadcasts, but the programme library will be extended over time.

TV channel Lineup

- 1. SVT1
- 2. SVT2
- 3. TV3
- 4. TV4
- 5. Kanal 5
- 6. TV6
- 7. TV4 Plus
- 8. TV8
- 9. Kanal 9
- 10. Discovery Channel
- 11. MTV
- 12. Eurosport
- 13. Kanal 11
- 14. SVTB/Kunskapskanalen
- 15. TV4 Sport
- 16. SVT24
- 17. SVT HD
- 20. Animal Planet
- 21. Discovery World
- 22. Discovery Science
- 23. Discovery Travel & Living
- 24. TV4 Fakta
- 25. National Geographic Channel
- 26. The History Channel
- 27. Investigation Discovery
- 28. TLC
- 29. BBC Knowledge
- 30. Viasat History
- 31. Viasat Nature/Crime/Playboy TV
- 32. Viasat Explorer/Spice
- 33. Spice Platinum
- 34. Hustler TV
- 35. Blue Hustler
- 36. FashionTV
- 37. Nautical Channel
- 40. Canal+ Sport 1
- 41. C More Hockey
- 42. C More Tennis
- 43. Chelsea TV
- 44. MUTV
- 45. C More Series
- 46. C More Hits
- 47. C More Action
- 48. C More Emotion
- 49. C More First
- 50. Viasat Film
- 52. Viasat Film Family
- 53. Viasat Film Action
- 54. Viasat Film Nordic
- 55. Viasat Film Classic
- 56. Viasat Film Comedy
- 57. Viasat Film Drama
- 58. TCM Nordic
- 59. SF-kanalen
- 60. TV4 Film
- 61. FOX
- 62. Silver
- 63. Sjuan
- 64. TNT
- 65. E!
- 66. Concert TV
- 67. Luxe.tv
- 68. CBS Reality
- 69. Ginx TV
- 70. Eurosport 2
- 72. Viasat Fotboll
- 73. Viasat Motor
- 74. Viasat Sport
- 75. Viasat Golf
- 76. Viasat Hockey
- 77. TV4 Sport
- 78. C More Fotboll
- 79. C More Kids
- 80. Nickelodeon
- 81. Cartoon Network
- 82. Boomerang
- 83. Disney Channel
- 84. Disney XD
- 85. Disney Junior
- 86. CBeebies
- 87. Nick Jr.
- 88. JimJam
- 91. CNN International
- 92. BBC World News
- 93. BBC Entertainment
- 94. BBC Lifestyle
- 95. Sky News
- 96. euronews
- 97. CNBC Nordic
- 98. Bloomberg TV
- 100. TV400
- 101. Star!
- 102. VH1
- 103. Comedy Central
- 104. TV4 Guld
- 105. TV4 Komedi
- 106. TV4 Fakta XL
- 107. TV7 (Sweden)
- 108. TV10
- 109. TV12
- 110 Kanal 10
- 111. LifeStyle TV
- 112. Axess TV
- 113. Kanal Global
- 114. Horse1
- 115. Travel Channel
- 116. VH1 Classic
- 150. Säsongskort 1
- 151. Säsongskort 2
- 152. Säsongskort 3
- 153. Säsongskort 4
- 154. Säsongskort 5
- 200. DR1
- 201. DR2
- 210. NRK1
- 212. TV 2 Norway
- 220. YLE TV Mondo
- 300. HRT1
- 302. TV Polonia
- 303. GOD TV
- 304. TVE Internacional
- 305. TV5Monde
- 306. DW-TV
- 307. RT
- 308. Al Jazeera English
- 309. NHK World TV
- 310. Wion Tv
- 311. PTV World
- 312. Australia Plus
- 313. Arirang TV
- 314. KBS World
- 551. OutTV
- 777. Telia Nöjeskanalen
- 900. 24nt
- 901. 24Corren
- 902. 24Norrbotten
- 903. TV Åre
- 999. SVT Regional
