= Canal Digital =

Pay television and internet service provider

Canal Digital AS
- Type: Aksjeselskap
- Industry: Telecommunication
- Founded: 1997
- Defunct: April 13, 2021
- Fate: Merged with Viasat to form Allente
- Successor: Allente
- Headquarters: Fornebu, Norway
- Area served: Nordic countries
- Products: Cable television Satellite television Internet service provider
- Number of employees: 106 (2026)
- Parent: Telenor
- Website: www.canaldigital.com

Canal Digital was a Nordic pay TV and internet service provider in Norway, Sweden, Denmark and Finland that was founded in March 1997 as a joint venture between the Canal+ and the Norwegian telecommunications operator Telenor.

The number of customers in 2017 was 838,000.

From 2003 to 2020, Canal Digital was fully owned by Telenor. In 2004, Telenor Avidi was merged into Canal Digital and changed its name to Canal Digital cable television. In 2020, Canal Digital formed a joint venture with Viasat to form the company Allente. The merger was completed on April 13, 2021.

Canal Digital started as a direct broadcast satellite television service to Sweden, Norway, Denmark and Finland, but later expanded into cable television in Norway, Sweden and Denmark, digital terrestrial television in Finland and IPTV in Sweden and Denmark. More than 2.9 million Nordic households and activities were subscribed to their services. Between 1997 and 2007, they operated Kiosk, a pay-per-view service available on their satellite platform that showed feature films before they had their pay-TV premiere on Canal+.

FTTH services have slowly started in selected areas in Norway.

Internet access through the cable network is based on the EuroDOCSIS standard.

Canal Digital's cable system in the newer network areas which included most of Canal Digital's cable networks in Norway was based on hybrid fibre-coaxial technology. Some other network areas are copper only, but are subjected to upgrading in order to support new TV set-top box's.

Unlike its contemporary DTH rival, Viasat, Canal Digital did not own a TV-network, although during Canal+'s ownership of the company from 1997 to 2003 they had control over the Canal+ channels available in the Nordics at the time, but these were later sold to other companies and were eventually rebranded as C More in 2012.

Canal Digital instead opted to secure several multi-year exclusive deals with different TV broadcasters. As of 2011, Canal Digital had exclusive satellite rights with C More Entertainment, ProSiebenSat.1 in Denmark, Eurosport, BBC Worldwide and Discovery Communications. Satellite exclusivity was more common in the past, but many channels that were once exclusive to Canal Digital have eventually signed agreements with Viasat. Broadcasters that were once exclusive to Canal Digital later joined Viasat include Sveriges Television (joined Viasat in 2003), TV4 AB (2005–2006), National Geographic Channel, ProSiebenSat.1 in Norway and Sweden, TV 2 (Denmark) and TV 2 (Norway).

Their satellite broadcasts can be received from the Thor 5 and Thor 6 satellites at 1°W with any DVB-S Receiver Equipped with a Conax Descrambling Module.

== Satellite television ==
=== High-definition television ===
Canal Digital was the first major distributor in the region to launch high-definition television. The first channel, C More HD, was launched in September 2005, using MPEG-2 compression. In June 2006, Canal Digital started broadcasting HD-kanalen from Sveriges Television and TV4 AB in Sweden, which did broadcast the 2006 FIFA World Cup in HD using MPEG-4 compression. HD-kanalen became SVT HD in October when SVT expanded their HD broadcasts.

The major launch of HDTV occurred in Sweden in November 2006 when a special high-definition package with Discovery HD and Voom HD launched and C More HD was rebranded as Canal+ HD. The high-definition package were to be released in the other Nordic countries during 2007. High-definition channels launching in 2007, include Canal+ Sport HD in February, National Geographic Channel HD in April, TV4 HD (Sweden only) in May, Silver HD in September and History HD in December.

2008 brought Kanal 5 HD in January, Eurosport HD in May, Nelonen HD, TVNorge HD in October and BBC HD in December. Channels launched in 2009, include TV 2 Film HD in January and Animal Planet HD in February.

The HD channels were initially offered for as a separate package, but starting on 1 April 2008, this package was dropped in Sweden and the HD channels were included in the "Family" package.

=== Danish channels ===
- DR1 (HD)
- DR2 (SD)
- DR3 (HD)
- DR K (SD)
- DR Ramasjang (SD)
- DR Ultra (SD)
- TV 2 (HD)
- TV 2 News (HD)
- TV 2 Charlie (HD)
- TV 2 Fri (HD)
- TV 2 Sport (HD)
- TV 2 Zulu (HD)
- TV3 (SD)
- TV3+ (HD)
- TV3 Puls (SD)
- TV3 Sport 1 (SD)
- Kanal 4 (HD)
- Kanal 5 (HD)
- 6'eren (HD)
- Canal 9 (HD)
- Discovery Channel (HD)
- dk4 (SD)
- Dantoto Racing (SD)

DR1 and DR2 are also available with a premium subscription in Norway, Sweden and Finland. Although TV 2 is broadcast on one of Canal Digital's transponders, it is not a DTH channel. Its only available to the Norwegian cable market, and is not a subscription channel.

=== Finnish channels ===
- Yle
- Yle TV1 (HD)
- Yle TV2 (HD)
- Yle Fem (HD)
- Yle Teema (HD)
- Nelonen (HD)
- Liv
- Jim
- Nelonen Prime
- Nelonen Nappula
- Nelonen Maailma
- Nelonen Pro 1 (HD)
- Nelonen Pro 2 (HD)
- MTV3 (HD)
- Sub
- C More First (HD)
- MTV Fakta
- MTV Komedia
- MTV Juniori
- MTV Sport
- MTV Total
- AVA
- Suomi TV
- MTV
- Discovery Channel
- AVA TV

=== Norwegian channels ===
- NRK
- NRK1
- NRK1 HD
- NRK2
- NRK3
- NRK Super
- TV3
- Viasat4
- TV 2
- TV 2 HD
- TV2 Zebra
- TV2 Filmkanalen
- TV2 Nyhetskanalen
- TV2 Sport (PPV)
- TV 2 Bliss
- TV Norge
- TV Norge HD
- Canal 9
- FEM
- Rikstoto Direkte
- MAX
- MTV
- Discovery Channel
- The Voice TV
- Visjon Norge

=== Swedish channels ===
- SVT
- SVT1
- SVT2
- SVT24
- SVT Barnkanalen
- Kunskapskanalen
- SVT HD
- TV4
- Sjuan
- TV4 Film
- TV400
- TV4 Fakta
- TV4 Guld
- TV4 Komedi
- TV4 Fakta XL
- TV4 Sport
- TV4 Sprt Xtra
- TV4 HD
- TV3
- Kanal 5
- TV7
- TV8
- Kanal 9
- TV11
- TV12
- Kanal Global
- Kanal 10
- Horse1
- MTV
- Comedy Central
- Discovery Channel
- The Voice TV
- Nickelodeon
- TNT (Sweden)

=== Transnational ===
- Adult Channel
- Al Jazeera English
- Animal Planet
- Animal Planet HD
- BBC Brit
- BBC Earth
- BBC Lifestyle
- BBC World News
- Boomerang
- Bloomberg TV
- Blue Hustler
- Cartoon Network
- Chelsea TV
- C More First
- C More Hits
- C More Action
- C More Comedy
- C More Drama
- C More Film HD
- C More Sport 1
- C More Sport 2
- C More Sport Extra
- C More Sport HD
- CNBC Nordic
- CNN International
- Discovery World
- Discovery HD Showcase
- Discovery Science
- Discovery Travel & Living
- Disney Channel
- Disney Junior
- Disney XD (defunct)
- E!
- ESPN Classic
- Euronews
- Eurosport
- Eurosport 2
- Eurosport HD
- Extreme Sports Channel
- FashionTV
- GOD TV
- History
- History HD
- Horse & Country TV
- Hustler TV
- Investigation Discovery
- Motors TV
- MTV Hits
- MTV Live HD
- MUTV
- National Geographic Channel
- National Geographic Channel HD
- Nat Geo Wild
- Nick Jr. Channel
- Outdoor Channel
- Playboy TV
- The Poker Channel
- Sky News International
- Silver
- Silver HD
- Showtime
- Turner Classic Movies
- TLC
- TV5MONDE
- Tvins
- TV Shop
- Voom HD
- VH1
- VH1 Classic

== Cable television ==
=== Norway ===
As of 23 October 2018, Canal Digital Cable TV was fully fused into Telenor, marketed mainly as Telenor T-We while dropping the Canal Digital name with a primary focus on the T-We app for phones, tablets and Apple TV alongside traditional cable television tuners.

This fusing separated Canal Digital Cable TV and Canal Digital Satellite TV customers further to avoid confusion between the two companies for their customers, which after the change had to either contact Telenor T-We or Canal Digital Satellite.

=== Sweden ===
Canal Digital in Sweden expanded into cable television in September 2003, when the cable companies Telenor Vision and Sweden Online were merged into Canal Digital.

== Terrestrial television ==
Canal Digital sells decryption cards for digital television in Finland. Prior to the close down of the analogue channels, the package consisted of Disney Channel and four C More Entertainment TV channels. When the analogue transmitters were closed down, a new multiplex launched bringing Kino TV, Nickelodeon, Discovery Channel and MTV to the package. Kino TV is exclusive was exclusive to Canal Digital, while the others were also sold by its competitor, PlusTV. The erotic channel Canal 69 is added on 1 October 2007.

The Terrestrial TV Package now consists of:

- Discovery Channel
- Disney Channel
- Kino TV
- MTV
- Canal+ Film 1
- Canal+ Film 2
- Canal+ Sport 1
- Canal+ Sport 2
- Canal 69

Canal Digital have expressed interest in selling encryption cards for the digital terrestrial television network in Sweden. The Norwegian terrestrial operator RiksTV is partly owned by Canal Digital's owner Telenor.

== IPTV ==
An IPTV service was launched in Sweden in 2004. It offers most of channels also provided on the satellite platform as well as interactive television services and video on demand from C More Select, C More On demand, Film-To-Home and SF Anytime.

== See also ==
- List of Danish television channels
- List of Finnish television channels
- List of Icelandic television channels
- List of Norwegian television channels
- List of Swedish television channels
- Telenor – The company that owns Canal Digital
