= Com Hem =

Swedish telecommunications brand

Com Hem Holding AB
- Type: Aktiebolag
- Industry: Telecommunications
- Founded: 1983
- Founder: Televerket
- Fate: Merged into Tele2 in 2018–2019; discontinued as a brand as of April 2021
- Successor: Tele2
- Headquarters: Stockholm, Sweden
- Area served: Countrywide
- Key people: Anders Nilsson, CEO
- Services: Cable television Broadband internet Fixed-line telephone MVNO (via Com Hem Mobil and Penny)
- Revenue: ▲SEK 4.91 billion (2016)
- Operating income: ▲SEK 1.48 billion (2016)
- Number of employees: 993 (2016)
- Parent: Kinnevik (18,5%); Public since 17 June 2014
- Subsidiaries: Boxer TV Access
- Website: comhem.se

Com Hem was a Swedish brand owned by Tele2 AB which supplied Triple Play services that included cable television, broadband internet and fixed-line telephone.

Founded in 1983 as Televerket Kabel-TV as part of the former state-owned Televerket, the company was successively named Svenska Kabel-TV AB and Telia InfoMedia TeleVision AB, before becoming 'Com Hem' (a play on the Swedish phrase Kom hem, "come home") in 1999. In 2003, Telia had to sell Com Hem to EQT AB to satisfy EU competition requirements as a result of its merger with Sonera of Finland that same year.

In 2021 the company had 135+ TV channels available. Digital TV was introduced in 1997. A broadband service that used the company's proprietary cable network was launched in 1999. In 2004 VoIP telephone was introduced, and the company became Sweden's first nationwide triple play service provider.

All households connected to the Com Hem Cable Network had access to broadband Internet services, services, fixed-line telephony and a wide range of TV channels. Com Hem also provided interactive services that facilitated management, communication and maintenance for property owners.

The company had around 1000 employees, with offices in Stockholm, Gothenburg, Malmö, Västerås, Härnösand, Sundsvall and Örnsköldsvik.

In 2011, EQT sold the company to BC Partners. Com Hem held its initial public offering (IPO) on 17 June 2014 and became listed on Stockholm Stock Exchange. On 27 April 2017 Kinnevik acquired approximately 18.5% of the stock and became Com Hem's largest stock holder. Com Hem also operated mobile services as an MVNO using its own brand and since early-2020, also with an online-only brand called Penny (managed by Tele2 since 2021) whose operations are modelled after Google Fi Wireless, and is also a broadband flanker brand using Com Hem/Tele2's fixed-line infrastructure. Com Hem's mobile services utilised the Tele2 (SUNAB and Net4Mobility) infrastructure in 2G GSM, 3G UMTS and 4G LTE.

Com Hem had been ranked as the TV brand with the least satisfied customers in Sweden in 2007, 2008 and 2009 according to Svenskt Kvalitetsindex, an independent customer survey company. It has since almost reached the top of the ranking with the most satisfied customers, according to the same source. Analogue channels were withdrawn from the cable television network on 8 September 2020.

On 27 April 2021, the owner Tele2 discontinued the use of the Com Hem brand, while continuing to provide the same services under its own brand.

== List of channels ==
=== Digital ===
	Channel	8 favorites	Package
1.	SVT1		Small
2.	SVT2		Small
3.	TV3	Yes	Medium
4.	TV4		Small
5.	Kanal 5	Yes	Medium
6.	TV6		Small
7.	TV4 Plus	Yes	Medium
8.	TV8	Yes	Medium
9.	Kanal 9	Yes	Medium
10.	Eurosport	Yes	Medium
11.	TV10		
12.	Kanal 11		
13.	TV12		
14.	Kanal 10		
15.	Kanal Global		
16.	Horse1		
17.	Lifestyle TV		
18.	Öppna Kanalen		
19.	TVins		
20.	Com Hem-kanalen		
36.	BBC Knowledge	Yes	Large
37.	BBC HD	Yes	Large/HDTV
38.	History Channel HD	Yes	Large/HDTV
39.	Nat Geo Wild	Yes	Large
40.	TV7	Yes	Medium
41.	Animal Planet	Yes	Medium
42.	Axess TV		Small
43.	BBC Entertainment	Yes	Medium
44.	Discovery Channel	Yes	Medium
45.	Discovery World	Yes	Large
46.	Discovery Science	Yes	Large
47.	TLC	Yes	Large
48.	Discovery HD	Yes	HDTV
49.	Kanal 10	Yes	No
50.	MTV	Yes	Medium
51.	MTV Rocks	Yes	Large
52.	Mezzo TV	Yes	Large
53.	National Geographic Channel	Yes	Large
54.	Playboy TV	Yes	Large
55.	Star!	Yes	Medium
56.	Travel Channel	Yes	Large
57.	TNT	Yes	Medium
58.	National Geographic Channel HD	Yes	HDTV
59.	VH1	Yes	Medium
60.	Viasat Nature/Crime	Yes	Medium
61.	Viasat History	Yes	Medium
62.	Comedy Central	Yes	Medium
63.	TV4 Fakta	Yes	Large
64.	TV4 Guld	Yes	Medium
65.	TV4 Komedi	Yes	Medium
66.	SVT HD		Small
67.	Silver HD	Yes	HDTV
68.	FashionTV	Yes	No
69.	Yacht & Sail	Yes	No
70.	TV4 Fakta XL	Yes	Large
71.	CBS Reality	Yes	No
72.	TV4 HD	Yes	Large/HDTV
73.	BBC Lifestyle	Yes	Large
74.	Sjuan	Yes	Medium
75.	C More Sport	No	Canal+
76.	C More Fotboll	No	Canal+
77.	C More Hockey	No	Canal+
79.	C More First	No	Canal+
80.	C More Hits	No	Canal+
81.	C More Action	No	Canal+
82.	C More Series	No	Canal+
83.	C More Emotion	No	Canal+
84.	C More Live	No	Canal+
85.	Viasat Film	No	TV1000
86.	Viasat Film Comedy	No	TV1000
87.	Viasat Film Family	No	TV1000
88.	Viasat Film Action	No	TV1000
89.	AMC	No	
90.	Viasat Film Classic	No	TV1000
91.	Viasat Film Drama	No	TV1000
92.	Showtime	Yes	No
93.	TCM	Yes	Medium
94.	TV4 Film	Yes	Medium
95.	Silver	Yes	Large
96.	Viasat Explorer	Yes	Large
97.	Sundance Channel	No	
98.	SF-kanalen	No	Canal+
99.	Hustler TV	No	No
100.	Viasat Sport	Yes	Medium
101.	Extreme Sports Channel	Yes	Large
102.	Eurosport HD	Yes	HDTV
103.	TV4 Sport Xtra	Yes	Medium
104.	ESPN Classic	Yes	Large
105.	Viasat Fotboll	No	Viasat Sport
106.	Viasat Hockey	No	Viasat Sport
107.	Viasat Motor	No	Viasat Sport
108.	Motors TV	Yes	Large
109.	Viasat Golf	No	No
110.	Fuel TV	Yes	No
111.	Viasat Sport HD	No	Viasat Sport
113.	C More Tennis	No	
114.	C More Extreme		
115.	Viasat Ticket		
119.	SVT24		
120.	CNN International	Yes	Medium
121.	BBC World News	Yes	Large
122.	CNBC Europe	Yes	Large
123.	Bloomberg TV		
124.	euronews		
125.	Kunskapskanalen		Small
126.	Sky News International	Yes	Large
127.	Channel NewsAsia		Large
128.	Al Jazeera English	Yes	Large
129.	RT		
150.	Cartoon Network	Yes	Medium
152.	Nickelodeon	Yes	Medium
153.	SVT Barnkanalen		Small
154.	Disney Channel	Yes	Large
155.	Disney XD	Yes	Large
156.	Disney Junior	Yes	Medium
157	Nick Jr. Channel		
158.	C More Kids		
170.	DR1	Yes	No
171.	NRK1	Yes	No
172.	Yle Fem	Yes	No
174.	HRT1	Yes	No
175.	Pink Plus	No	No
176.	Channel One Russia Worldwide	No	No
177.	DW-TV	Yes	No
178.	TV Chile	No	No
179.	TVP Polonia	Yes	No
180.	TV5MONDE	Yes	No
181.	TVE Internacional	Yes	No
182.	ZDF	Yes	No
183.	Al Jazeera Arabic	Yes	No
184.	MBC Europe	Yes	No
185.	Show TV	Yes	No
186.	TRT Türk	Yes	No
187.	IRIB 2	Yes	No
200.	ART Movies	Yes	No
201.	LBC Europe	Yes	No
202.	IRINN	Yes	No
206.	RTS Sat	Yes	No
207.	RTK	Yes	No
208.	OBN	Yes	No
209.	TVCG Montenegro	Yes	No
210.	3sat	Yes	No
211.	Canal 24 Horas	Yes	No
212.	Canal de las Estrellas	Yes	No
213.	Rai Italia	Yes	No
214.	RTP Internacional	Yes	No
215.	France 2	Yes	No
216.	Duna TV	Yes	No
217.	m2	Yes	No
218.	NEPIT World	Yes	No
219.	PRO TV Internaţional	Yes	No
220.	Polsat International	Yes	No
221.	Wion Tv	Yes	Yes
222.	TVP1	No	Yes
223.	TVP2	No	Yes
224.	TVP Info	No	Yes
223.	RTL	No	Yes
223.	ProSieben	No	Yes
224.	RIK Sat	No	Yes
225.	Sat.1	Yes	Yes
226.	NPO 1	No	Yes
227.	NPO 2	No	Yes
228.	BBC One (Scotland)	Yes	Yes
229.	RTÉ One	Yes	Yes
230.	S4C	Yes	Yes

== Analogue ==
- NFL Network
- Animal Planet
- Travel + Escape (TV channel)
- The Learning Channel
- W Network
- History Channel
- Hunan Television
- SVT1
- SVT2
- TV3
- TV4
- Kanal 5
- TV6
- TV7
- TV8
- Kanal 9
- TV10
- Kanal 11
- TV12
- MTV
- TV4 Sport
- SVT24
- SVTB
- Love Nature
- CNN International
- Golf Channel
- Makeful
- CNBC
- WWE Network
- Fashion TV
- SET International
- DW-TV
- CTi International
- SAB TV
- Kunskapskanalen

The analogue package could also include a few local channels, usually an open access channel such as public access channels known as Öppna Kanalen (sv). In areas near Denmark, Norway or Finland, Com Hem usually included channels from the neighboring countries such as TV Finland, YLE TV1, DR1, TV2 Denmark and NRK1.

== See also ==
- List of Swedish television channels
