= Digital terrestrial television in Sweden =

Swedish Digital terrestrial television

Digital terrestrial television was launched in Sweden in 1999. The shutdown of the analogue equivalent started on September 19, 2005, and was finalized on October 15, 2007.

The network uses the DVB-T-standard and broadcasts several free-to-air and encrypted channels on a number of multiplexes. The majority of the channels are encrypted and viewing them requires a decoding card.

== History ==
On April 9, 1997, the Swedish Riksdag decided that digital terrestrial television (DTT) was to be introduced in Sweden. In June 1998, the government decided which channels were to broadcast in the network. The channels that received a national license were: TV3, Kanal 5, Canal+, Kunskaps-TV i Sverige (to be K World), TV8 and Cell Internet Commerce Development (eTV) in addition to SVT1, SVT24 and TV4. Originally, only two multiplexes were planned and therefore SVT2 was omitted. However, before the launch a third multiplex was decided on and SVT2 would be allowed to broadcast.

Two companies were created to handle the encryption services, as all channels would be encrypted: Senda i Sverige who managed the system and decoding cards and Boxer who rented out set-top-boxes.

The digital terrestrial television network was launched on April 1, 1999, making Sweden the second country in Europe to launch digital terrestrial television. It then contained only SVT1, SVT2 and SVT24. Five regional SVT channels launched some months later.

Private companies didn't launch until the autumn when TV3, TV4, Kanal 5, TV8, K World, Canal+ and eTV launched. Canal+ were granted two extra licenses to broadcast Canal+ Gul and Canal+ Blå. Boxer started their business in the autumn.

The take-up was slow at first. When the network had been running for six months, only about 500 households had rented the necessary set-top-boxes.

New licenses were granted in January 2000. A fourth multiplex was launched in the spring. After this, the DTT network looked like this:

- MUX A: SVT1, SVT2, SVT24 and five regional channels.
- MUX B: TV4, an extra stream from TV4, eTV and regional channels (Stockholm 1, NollEttan, DTU7 and Skånekanalen)
- MUX C: Canal+, Canal+ Gul, Canal+ Blå, Kanal 5, K World
- MUX D: TV3, ZTV, TV8, TV1000 and Viasat Sport

MTG said they weren't allowed to use commercial breaks in the terrestrial network. The commercial break were replaced by captions. Kanal 5 did however continue broadcasting their commercial breaks as they did on satellite. In January 2001, MTG introduced an extra fee of 115 SEK for TV3, ZTV and TV8 to cover the losses made as they didn't broadcast advertising.

In June 2001, MTG decided to cease their terrestrial broadcasts in August, which they did. As they didn't broadcast anything at all, the license was taken back, making MTG claim that they were thrown out of the DTT network.

The five MTG were replaced by other channels during the autumn of 2001: Discovery Channel, Animal Planet, MTV Nordic, Nickelodeon/VH1 and Eurosport. TV4 were granted a license to broadcast CNN International.

During 2002, both eTV and K World went bankrupt. The SVT regional channels were closed down and replaced by an event channel called SVT Extra. NonStop Television started broadcasting a channel called E! in the autumn. Senda and Boxer merged on October 1, 2002, to form the new Boxer TV Access.

In December 2002, SVT launched the children's channel Barnkanalen followed in February 2003 by a relaunch of SVT24. TV4 launched their first major digital channel TV4 Plus, now Sjuan, in March.

During 2003 and 2004 the sale of set-top-boxes increased after several years of financial difficulties.

The shutdown of the analogue network was decided on in the spring of 2003.

In 2004 the launch of a fifth multiplex and more efficient compression made it possible to allow more channels to launch: Disney Channel, TV3, ZTV, TV4 Film, TV8, TCM, BBC World, Discovery Travel & Adventure and Showtime. This meant that MTG returned to the DTT network. They did broadcast free-to-air for some months, but in August they decided to scramble their broadcasts. 2004 also saw the launch of Kunskapskanalen from SVT and UR. At the end of 2004, the DTT networked looked like this:

- MUX 1: SVT1, SVT2, SVT24, Barnkanalen/Kunskapskanalen (and SVT Extra)
- MUX 2: TV4, TV4 Plus, Med i tv, TV4 Film, CNN International and regional channels.
- MUX 3: Canal+, Canal+ Film 1, Canal+ Film 2 Weekend Sport, Kanal 5, TV3 and Disney Channel/Canal 7
- MUX 4: Discovery Channel, Animal Planet, MTV Nordic, Nickelodeon/VH1 Eurosport, Star! and ZTV
- MUX 5: Discovery Travel & Living, TCM, BBC World, Showtime and TV8.

In early 2005, TV8 was moved to MUX 3 which had higher coverage than MUX 5, which at start only covered 50 percent of the households. Several changes were made to the local programmes during 2005. TV4 started making their local stations available in the digital network (previously TV4 Stockholm was shown nationwide) and SVT started providing an alternative local output so the viewer could choose to watch a neighbouring region. New regional commercial channels started: ByTV Jämtland in Jämtland and Kanal Lokal in Stockholm, Gothenburg and Skåne.

On September 19, 2005, the island of Gotland became the first region to have its analogue transmitters turned off. This continued during the autumn when the Gävle and Motala transmitters were shut down.

The fact that only the SVT channels, TV4 and the local channels were available free-to-air was a problem during the switch-off as those affected didn't feel they got enough in return for the trouble of having to buy set-top-boxes and in some cases a new antenna.

When new licenses for 2006 were pending, the Minister of Education and Culture Leif Pagrotsky stated that those broadcasters who were going to broadcast free-to-air would be more likely to receive a new license. New licenses were awarded in February 2006. This meant that:

- Viasat would be awarded a license to broadcast TV6 round-the-clock in MUX 2
- The newspaper Aftonbladet and Axel and Margaret Ax:son Johnson Foundation would share free-to-air one stream in MUX5. Aftonbladet would broadcast what became Aftonbladet TV7 on Weekdays while Axess TV was broadcast in the weekend.
- SBS Broadcasting received one stream in MUX 4 that would be shared by The Voice TV and a channel called "C 5". The Voice TV would broadcast free-to-air from 6 a.m. to 6 p.m. while "C 5", renamed ONE Television at launch, would broadcast 6 p.m. to 6 a.m.
- NonStop Television had to replace Showtime with a new channel called "NonStop Filmfestival". It launched in May as Silver.
- BBC Prime would broadcast one pay channel in MUX 5.
- Star! got its hours cut and would now broadcast in the Nickelodeon downtime from 6 p.m. to 6 a.m.
- VH1, which was previously broadcast in the Nickelodeon downtime, would now broadcast "if space was available". Initially it did broadcast round-the-clock, but when this space was taken over by The Voice/ONE the channel disappeared. VH1 returned in June 2006, broadcasting overnight on the MTV's space.

In June 2006, SVT and TV4 did broadcast the 2006 FIFA World Cup in high-definition on temporary frequencies from a few transmitters. Those frequencies were taken back when the World Cup ended.

In December 2006, the new right-wing government decided that a sixth multiplex would be taken into regular use, initially only to secure that the broadcasts of TV Finland would be secured when the transmitter of the capital region was turned off.

The Boxer monopoly on pay television was criticized by the European Commission and on October 17, 2006, it announced would be taking Sweden to the European Court of Justice as the country had failed to abolish the monopoly.

SBS Broadcasting decided to replace ONE Television with a new channel called Kanal 9 in February 2007. With the launch of Kanal 9, they were allowed to adjust the Kanal 9/The Voice TV timeshare.

On May 26, 2007, SVT HD was launched on the remaining capacity of the multiplex that broadcast TV Finland, broadcasting HDTV programmes from four transmitters around the capital using MPEG-4 AVC compression.

On March 27, 2008, new broadcasts licenses were announced by the Radio and TV Authority (RTVV). This was the first time that the RTVV issued broadcast licenses and not government. New channels granted national licenses were Comedy Central, Discovery Science, Jetix, National Geographic Channel, Showtime, TV4 Sport, TV1000 and Viasat Sport 1. In addition, new regional licenses were given to 24nt, 24 Västra Götaland, Borås Tidning TV, Kanal 12 and ST TV as well as Kanal Lokal in Dalarna, Gävleborg, Jämtland, Norrbotten, Västernorrland, Småland and Blekinge.

Out of the new channels, Discovery Science, National Geographic Channel, Showtime, Jetix, TV1000 and Viasat Sport 1 would be put in the new sixth national multiplex. I addition, BBC World and Discovery Travel & Living would move to this multiplex. The new multiplex would use the newer H.264/MPEG-4 AVC compression which would allow ten channels to broadcast from one network simultaneously, as opposed to the older, less efficient, MPEG-2 used by the existing multiplexes.

Some channels got new broadcasting hours. Axess TV could start broadcasting the entire week, Aftonbladet TV7 and Canal 7 would timeshare so TV7 broadcast during the daytime and Canal 7 during the evening and night, VH1 got to broadcast between 10 p.m. and 6 a.m., Nickelodeon had its hours extended, reducing those of Star!.

The new licenses also stipulated that TV7, The Voice TV and Star! would have to move to the sixth multiplex on January 1, 2009. This makes TV7, Canal 7, Kanal 9, The Voice TV and Star! to become 24-hour channels and also provides the space where Comedy Central will broadcast.

As of 2010 the following line up is as follow:

- MUX 1: SVT1, SVT2, SVTK, SVTB, SVT24, SR P1, SR P2 Music and SR P3
- MUX 2: TV4, Sjuan, TV4 Fakta, TV4 Film, TV6, CNN and TV400
- MUX 3: Canal+ First, Canal+ Hits Sport Weekend, Canal+ Sport 1, Disney Channel, Kanal 5, SF-kanalen, TV3, TV8 and VH1
- MUX 4: Animal Planet, Comedy Central, Discovery Channel, Eurosport, Kanal 9, MTV Sweden, Nickelodeon and ZTV
- MUX 5: Axess TV, BBC World, Canal 7, Discovery Science, Discovery Travel & Living, Disney XD, Showtime, Star!, 7, Silver, TCM, TV4 Sport, 24nt/24Corren/24Norrbotten/Kanal 12 and TV Finland
- MUX 6: Canal+ Sport HD, Discovery HD Showcase, Eurosport HD, Kanal 5 HD and Silver HD
- MUX 7: SVT1 HD, SVT2 HD and TV4 HD

== DTT Channels ==
As of 21 January 2026:

LCN	Channel	Owner	Availability	MUX and Standart
1.	SVT1 HD	SVT	National, regional variations	MUX1, DVB-T
2.	SVT2 HD	SVT	National	MUX1, DVB-T
96.	SVT1 HD	SVT	National, alternative regional variations	MUX1, DVB-T
98.	SVT Barn/SVT24	SVT	National	MUX1, DVB-T
99.	Kunskapskanalen	SVT	National	MUX1, DVB-T

== See also ==
- Digital television transition
