= Boxer TV Access =

Swedish television company

Boxer TV Access AB
- Type: Aktiebolag (private)
- Industry: Media, Telecommunications
- Founded: 1999
- Headquarters: Stockholm, Sweden Boxer TV-Access AB; Dublin, Ireland Boxer DTT Limited; Copenhagen, Denmark Boxer TV Danmark
- Key people: Per Norman – CEO of the Board of Boxer AB; Crister Fritzson – President of the Board of Boxer AB
- Products: Digital terrestrial television
- Owner: Tele2 AB (100%)
- Number of employees: 60 (Sweden), 50 (Denmark), 2 (Ireland)
- Website: www.boxer.se

Boxer TV Access is a Swedish brand owned by Tele2 AB providing pay television channels over broadband and streaming television, and until 2 January 2025, on the digital terrestrial television network in Sweden. Modeled on the British ITV Digital, it was founded in October 1999. Some channels on the Swedish DTT are free-to-air, but most of the channels require subscription from Boxer. Boxer has claimed to have around 500,000 subscribers by June 2016 when it was acquired by ComHem.

Boxer offers dozens of channels, with the number of channels varying depending on location and how one wants to count. As of early 2008, channels from Boxer broadcast on four national transmitter networks, of which three (MUX2, MUX3 and MUX4) can be received by 98 percent of the population using a regular antenna. The fourth network, named MUX5, has lower coverage. Another transmitter network (MUX1) has higher coverage but it doesn't contain any Boxer channels.

The majority shareholder was held in Boxer TV Access by Teracom which is owned by the Swedish state. The British venture capital firm 3i held a 30 percent stake. Teracom acquired this 30% stake from 3i in November 2008. Teracom sees this 100% stake as a logical next step. 3I had held the 30% having acquired the shares from Skandia Media Invest in 2005. With its 100% stake, Teracom moves from majority to sole shareholder in Boxer.

"Teracom has always been the main shareholder in Boxer and acquiring all the shares is a logical continuation of that ownership. Boxer will continue its successful business in the same manner as before, that is being a pay-TV operator dedicated to terrestrial platforms and working independently of any individual broadcaster", says Crister Fritzson, CEO of Teracom.

In March 2008, Boxer TV A/S, a subsidiary of Boxer TV Access, won the franchise to build and operate the terrestrial pay television platform in Denmark. In February 2009 it launched this service in Jutland covering West Denmark. This service will extend during 2009 to most of Denmark.

In 2008, Boxer announced that it had put in a bid to operate three of the four multiplexes of the DTT service for Ireland, in conjunction with Irish company Communicorp. On 21 July 2008 Boxer DTT Ireland were awarded the Irish franchise Boxer TV Ireland subject to contract. However, on 20 April 2009 the Broadcasting Commission of Ireland announced that contract negotiations had ended and Boxer DTT Ireland had withdrawn its application to operate the multiplexes.

In 2016, Sweden's operator Com Hem announced it had acquired Boxer TV-Access AB for an enterprise value of SEK 1,330m.

== History ==
At the beginning, what would become Boxer's business was laid with two companies: Senda, which rented out the program cards that would decrypt the broadcasts, and Boxer, which would rent out digital boxes and sell subscriptions.

Senda i Sverige AB was formed in December 1997 and was initially majority owned by Radiotjänst in Kiruna (60 percent) while Teracom owned the rest. The following year, TV4 AB began to lobby for them to also become part owners of Senda. And so it was, after which Senda was owned by SVT, UR, TV4 and Teracom. However, TV4's co-ownership caused protests from other commercial channels and TV4 therefore chose to leave Senda on 18 December 1998. Senda later became principally owned by Teracom. SVT remained with a minority position in Senda until 2002.

During the digital ground network's first year, things went slowly. When broadcasts began in April 1999, very few people could watch the digital broadcasts. In October 1999, Boxer began to build up his business. Then Anders Appelqvist was CEO and 500 households had a digital box. The supply was thin. In addition to the usual terrestrial channels, there were SVT24, TV8 and Canal+'s channels as well as some local channels; TV4 had started broadcasting as late as September. In January 2000, 4,000 households had rented digital TV boxes.

On January 31, Kanal 5 and TV3 began broadcasting, and in March ZTV, Viasat Sport and TV1000 also began broadcasting.

Boxer was originally Teracom's subsidiary. In April 2000, Skandia joined as a partner.

At the beginning of 2001, Boxer had 44,000 customers. On January 1, 2001, MTG decided to charge an extra fee of SEK 115 for TV3, ZTV and TV8 to cover, according to them, lost advertising revenue. This brought Boxer's sales to a standstill. On June 19, MTG decides to completely stop broadcasting in the terrestrial network in August. When MTG stopped broadcasting, Boxer had 80,000 customers. In addition, CEO Anders Appelkvist resigned and was replaced by Crister Fritzson later in the year.

At that time, Boxer had interactive services in the form of the Boxerportalen, also called Boxer.tv, which was a web portal that Boxer's customers could visit via their TV using their set-top boxes. The portal included news, games, the chat channels "Chatziki" and "Poolen" as well as an email service.

MTG was replaced later in the year by other channels. Eurosport, CNN and Nickelodeon began broadcasting on August 1, 2001. On December 3, MTV, VH1, Discovery Channel and Animal Planet also began broadcasting. In 2001, the company was also restructured and the number of employees was reduced from 90 to 30. In February 2002, Boxer changed further. The interactive services the company had previously were removed because it did not attract customers. The model based on Boxer renting out the digital boxes was also replaced by the retailers providing the decoder, which in practice meant that the customers had to own their own decoder.

In 2002, Boxer and Senda merged.

At the turn of the year 2002/2003, Boxer had 140,000 customers. In December 2003, Boxer reached 200,000 customers. After that, sales of subscriptions took off. After TV3 and ZTV started broadcasting in the digital terrestrial network again in March 2004, Boxer was able to offer the most watched Swedish channels, something that made sales really take off. TV3 and ZTV originally broadcast unencrypted for a few months, but became part of the encrypted offering in the fall. On December 31, 2004, Boxer had 375,000 customers, which was an increase of 175,000 during the year 2004. After the first quarter of 2005, Boxer had 410,000 customers, they state themselves.

In April 2005, Skandia Liv sold its holdings in several unlisted companies, including Boxer. New 30 percent owner thus became the British venture capital company 3i. At mid-year 2005, Boxer claimed to have 450,000 customers. After the switching off of the analogue network on Gotland, Crister Fritzon stated that "a majority of the Gotlanders who got digital TV in the weeks before the transition, seem to have got pay TV and the majority of them Boxer". The 500,000th customer arrived in November 2005 and was, according to Boxer, a woman in Östergötland who was given a PVR box at a ceremony in Motala (the days before the mast there was to be switched off for analogue broadcasts).

In the autumn of 2004, the "Tvillingpaketet" (later renamed the Tvillingkortet) was launched, which gave discounted access to the Boxer package's channels on an extra card for those who were already Boxer customers. A special "Barnkort" with children's channels and a "Short-term card" (later renamed a cash card) which gave access to the Boxer package's channels for a limited time without commitment were launched in May 2005.

In the spring of 2008, Boxer won a license from the Danish state to start and operate digital pay TV services in Denmark. The license ran for 12 years with exclusive rights and the license was won in strong competition with MTG and Telenor. On 21 July Boxer, in a consortium with BT (British Telecom) and Communicorp, won the license to operate pay TV in Ireland, here again in strong competition from other operators.

At the beginning of 2009, Boxer had 689,000 customers.

At the end of 2010, the first national HDTV broadcasts were launched, which use the new broadcast technology DVB-T2 as opposed to older DVB-T which was used for local test broadcasts in the Mälardalen by SVT's HD channel SVT HD until spring 2010. At the end of 2010, SVT's HD broadcasts made a comeback in the digital terrestrial network, but instead of an HD channel that combined SVT's range, both SVT1 and SVT2 were launched as HD channels with the same range as in the SD range. Both are free channels. Boxer launched an optional HD package at the end of 2010 for customers with either of the two major program offerings Boxer Mix or Boxer MAX. The optional HD package includes MTVN HD (which does not have the same range as MTV but is more focused on music videos and concerts), National Geographic HD, TV3 HD, TV4 HD and Kanal 5 HD. TV4's HD channel TV4 HD, which was planned to start broadcasting around the turn of the year between 2010 and 2011, thus did not become a free channel unlike TV4 in SD which was part of the free offer for which no subscription is required. Kanal 5 HD started broadcasting on February 1, 2011, TV3 HD on March 1, 2011 and TV4 HD started after delays on March 3, 2011. In April 2011, Boxer became the first Nordic TV provider to broadcast 3DTV via the terrestrial network.

The Swedish Quality Institute (SKI) gave Boxer a score of 66,3 out of 100 in the "Customer Satisfaction for Digital TV in the Private Market" in 2015, which was close to the industry score (66.7). In the 2016 survey, it fell to 57.4, far below that of the industry (62.1). It increased to 59,3 in 2017, vimaking it slightly closer to the industry standard (62).

Autumn 2018 saw the merged of Com Hem AB with Tele2 Sverige AB. The merger was approved on 30 April 2020 making Boxer a part of Tele2's services.

On 2 January 2025, Boxer left the terrestrial platform, with its subscriber base moving to the internet-based service. Boxer is since May 2025 a brand used for broadband and TV services.

== Channels ==
- SVT1 (regional version, free-to-air, AC3) (HDTV)
- SVT2 (free-to-air, AC3) (HDTV)
- TV3 (regional version) (HDTV)
- TV4 (local version, free-to-air) (HDTV)
- Kanal 5 (regional version) (HDTV)
- TV6
- Sjuan
- TV8
- Kanal 9
- TV10
- Kanal 11
- TV12
- National Geographic Wild
- MTV
- V Series
- MTV 00s
- TLC
- Godare
- National Geographic (HDTV)
- Animal Planet (MPEG-4) (HDTV)
- Discovery
- Investigation Discovery (MPEG-4)
- BBC Nordic
- Axess TV (MPEG-4)
- CNN
- BBC News (MPEG-4)
- Al Jazeera
- History
- Nickelodeon
- Nick Jr.
- Cartoon Network
- TV4 Sportkanalen (HDTV)
- Eurosport 1
- Eurosport 2
- V Sport Extra
- Fight Sports
- TV4 Stars (AC-3) (HDTV)
- TV4 Hits
- TV4 Motor/SF-kanalen
- TV4 Fotboll (HDTV)
- TV4 Sport Live 1/Tennis (HDTV)
- TV4 Hockey
- V Sport Premium
- V Sport 1
- V Sport Motor
- V Film Action
- Testkanal (MPEG-4)
- TV Finland (free-to-air, Stockholm and surrounding areas only)
- Alternate regional version of SVT1 (free-to-air, AC3) (HDTV)
- SVTB/SVT24 (free-to-air)
- Kunskapskanalen (free-to-air)

Note: For a period Radio services SR P1, SR P2 and SR P3 were broadcast in the Swedish DTT network as a test transminssion but this has been discontinued.

- MPEG-4 indicates that the channel requires a DVB-T or DVB-T2 receiver with MPEG-4 support.
- HDTV indicates that the channel requires a HD-ready TV and a DVB-T2 HDTV receiver.

== Monopoly distribution ==
Boxer had a monopoly for encrypted of television signals in the digital terrestrial network. If a broadcaster got to distribute television it had to either broadcast free-to-air or use the encryption services of Boxer. This was a contravention to European Union rules which require that there is an open market for radio and television broadcasting. On 17 October 2006 the European Commission announced that it was taking Sweden to the European Court of Justice for failure to abolish the monopoly. Neelie Kroes, Commissioner for Competition, said: "I regret that I have had to refer Sweden to the Court, but Swedish viewers should no longer be denied their right, guaranteed by (EU) law, to choose digital terrestrial TV suppliers".

The case against Sweden at the European Court of Justice taken by the European Commission, has since been withdrawn as a result of Sweden's amendment of the broadcast regulations. Previously, Sweden only allowed a single operator to handle all encryption services on the DTT platform but under the amended regulation, new operators will be able to offer encrypted DTT services making it possible for them to launch pay-DTT services.

== See also ==
- Boxer TV Denmark
- Boxer TV Ireland
