= SVT HD =

- Country: Sweden
- Broadcast area: Sweden

Programming
- Picture format: Aspect Ratio - 16:9 /720p (HDTV)

Ownership
- Owner: Sveriges Television
- Sister channels: SVT1, SVT2, SVT24 Barnkanalen, Kunskapskanalen, SVT Europa

History
- Launched: October 20, 2006
- Closed: September 20, 2010

Links
- Website: Website

SVT HD was a high-definition television channel from Swedish public broadcaster Sveriges Television (SVT). The channel broadcasts high-definition simulcasts of programmes from the other SVT channels, where available.

== History ==
The channel had its origins in 'HD-kanalen', a channel set up jointly by SVT and TV4 AB to broadcast the 2006 FIFA World Cup. The channel was transmitted by satellite on Canal Digital and from terrestrial transmitters. When the World Cup ended, the terrestrial frequencies were shut down. HD-kanalen continued on satellite, mostly broadcasting test films and promos from SVT HD and an experimental simulcast of The Marriage of Figaro in August 2006.

In October 2006, HD-kanalen became SVT HD and started simulcasting programmes from the other SVT channels. Its first programme was the feature film Lost in Translation, broadcast on October 20, followed by SVT's 50th anniversary show Välkommen på 50-årsfest which was the first live high-definition programme produced by SVT.

In late 2006 SVT HD broadcast the Swedish dramas En uppstoppad hund, Mästerverket, Snapphanar and AK3 and the movies Girl with a Pearl Earring, 21 Grams and House of Sand and Fog. Its first children's programme was the Christmas calendar LasseMajas detektivbyrå, its first current affairs programme was Böglobbyn and its first documentary was The Planet.

In October 2006, some programs on SVT1 began to be broadcast in HDTV format via the channel SVT HD.

SVT HD's first live sports broadcast after the 2006 World Cup was the FIS Nordic World Ski Championships 2007. In early 2007, SVT HD broadcast the BBC series Planet Earth, the Eurovision Song Contest 2007 and dramas.

On May 27, 2007, the channel became available terrestrially in the capital region using spare capacity on the frequency used to transmit TV Finland.

Programmes broadcast in summer 2007 included Bleak House; Live Earth; the 2007 World Championships in Athletics; and Allsång på Skansen, the first live entertainment programme since the October anniversary show.

In the autumn of 2007, SVT HD started simulcasting upscaled programmes from SVT24 in the evening when no high-definition programmes were available. This was later replaced by upscaled programs from SVT1 on June 16, 2008.

=== SVT1 HD and SVT2 HD ===
As the company was gearing up launch HD simulcasts of SVT1 and SVT2, the terrestrial transmissions in the capital were terminated on March 1.

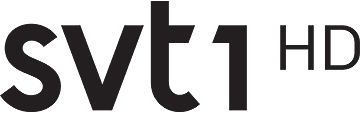
Logo used for SVT1 HD

On June 17, 2010, SVT received permission from the government to start broadcasting two HDTV channels in the digital terrestrial network. These were to be used for full-time simulcasts of SVT1 and SVT2.

On September 20, 2010, SVT HD was discontinued and replaced by a full-time simulcast of SVT1 in HDTV format on all platforms. SVT2 HD was launched first of November, 2010.

== Production ==
SVT Väst, located in Gothenburg, will be the first region to film all productions in high definition. SVT Väst moved their headquarters from Synvillan in Örgryte to the former Hasselblad headquarters (now coined Kanalhuset) in central Gothenburg. At the same time, new equipment was acquired for high definition productions.

In September 2008 the SVT studio in Umeå was equipped with HD cameras and started to produce the early evening show Go'kväll and the consumer information show Plus in high definition.

During 2009 the main television studios in Stockholm will be equipped with high definition cameras.

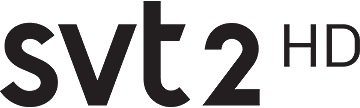
Logo used for SVT2 HD

== Distribution ==
Initially the channel was only available on satellite from Canal Digital, but on December 12, 2006, the cable network Com Hem launched its high-definition service consisting of four channels, including SVT HD.

On May 26, 2007 the channel started broadcasting over the Swedish digital terrestrial television network using MPEG-4 compression. It was only available from the Nacka, Västerås, Uppsala and Södertälje transmitters that also carried TV Finland.
