= SF Anytime =

Streaming video service

SF Anytime is a video on demand service owned by Bonnier available in Denmark, Finland, Norway and Sweden and primarily offering movies. It was launched in 2002 and was then only available on the Internet. In January 2005, the service was launched on the IPTV platform Telia Digital-tv. Other IPTV distributors, such as Canal Digital, Bredbandsbolaget and FastTV soon followed.

The service has deals with several distributors such as Warner Bros., 20th Century Studios, Buena Vista Distribution, Regency, Svensk Filmindustri, Scanbox and Sandrew Metronome.

SF Anytime cooperates with their sister company TV4 AB around their VOD service TV4 Anytime.

The Service is available on the latest Internet Explorer, Mozilla Firefox and Google Chrome browsers. It's also available on Apple TV devices and several smart-TVs like Panasonic and Samsung.
