= SVT Extra =

Former Swedish television channel

- Country: Sweden

Ownership
- Owner: Sveriges Television
- Sister channels: SVT1, SVT2, SVT Barn, Kunskapskanalen, SVT24

History
- Launched: 14 January 2002
- Closed: 2007

Links
- Website: www.svt.se

SVT Extra was a Swedish television channel owned and operated by Sveriges Television.

SVT Extra was started on 14 January 2002, using space preempted by the cancelling of SVT's regional channels. During its first year, it operated as a regular channel, providing extended coverage of several events and sports broadcasts. The channel was received by some 450,000 viewers on Boxer and on Com Hem. Its inclusion on Com Hem coincided with the signing of a new agreement between the companies. The plan was to develop the channel throughout 2002. Towards the end of the year, its place was taken over by Barnkanalen (only until 6pm) and most sports broadcasts were shifted over to SVT24. It was though expected to resume full-time broadcasts but only for a twelve-week period during summer 2003.

With SVT24's rebrand on 24 February 2003, the channel downsized. SVT Extra did however return occasionally, such as for the 2004 Olympics when it provided extended coverage, which it shared with SVT24.
