= ONE Television =

Former Swedish TV channel

Programming
- Picture format: 576i (SDTV)

Ownership
- Owner: Ny Kanal 1 (SBS Broadcasting)

History
- Launched: 24 May 2006
- Closed: 25 February 2007

Links
- Website: onetelevision.se

Availability

Terrestrial
- Boxer TV Access: Channel 52

ONE Television (On Europe Television) was a Swedish television channel which broadcast television shows such as The Bill, Murder Investigation Team and Later with Jools Holland. It was created to cater to the 40-59 demographic.

It was created in autumn 2005 when new television channels were licensed. Kanal 5 (SBS Broadcasting) created "Ny Kanal 1" (no relation to the former Kanal 1) with the aim of creating a free-to-air channel.

ONE Television timeshifted with The Voice TV and started broadcasting on 24 May 2006, as the government demanded that the launch of the new channels was during spring that year. Its target was a predominantly male, "mature and active" audience pertaining to the 40-49 demographic. Moreover, the channel almost clashed with the launch of TV6, a free-to-air channel replacing ZTV, who had a more successful slate of programming, including sports, something SBS didn't have for ONE.

The channel closed on 25 February 2007 and was replaced by Kanal 9.
