= The Voice TV Sweden =

Swedish music TV channel

- Country: United Kingdom
- Broadcast area: Sweden

Ownership
- Owner: ProSiebenSat.1 Media

History
- Launched: 17 December 2004
- Closed: September 2008

Links
- Website: https://web.archive.org/web/20061031193647/http://www.thevoicetv.se/

Availability

Terrestrial
- Digital terrestrial: Channel 42

The Voice TV Sweden was a Swedish language music television channel owned by ProSiebenSat.1 Media AG broadcasting from the United Kingdom. It was launched in December 2004.

Initially, it was only available on the Canal Digital satellite platform, but was launched on cable platforms, including Com Hem, later on. During its first full year, the channel had average ratings of 0,0 minutes per day and person (Mediamätning i Skandinavien).

In February 2006, the Swedish government announced that the channel had received a license to broadcast unencrypted in the digital terrestrial network between 6 a.m. to 6 p.m. The channel timeshares with ONE Television that broadcast between 6 p.m. and 6 a.m. Terrestrial broadcasting started in late May 2006. In February 2007, ONE Television was replaced by Kanal 9, which wanted to broadcast during other times than ONE Television did. The timeshare was altered so that Kanal 9 would broadcast from 5.40 p.m. to 5.40 a.m. on weekdays and from 2.30 p.m. to 2.30 a.m. on weekends, while The Voice TV would broadcast during the remaining time.

During the channel's second full year, 2006, the ratings had increased slightly to 0,2 minutes per day and person. In 2007, it was viewed 0,3 minutes per day.

In March 2008, The Voice TV received a new broadcast license running from 1 April 2008. The license stipulated that starting on 1 January 2009, The Voice TV would broadcast around the clock. This would be done using a new transmitter network that would use H.264 compression.

In early September 2008 it was announced that The Voice TV would be closed down on 30 September. This was mostly because the channel would move to a new transmitter network. At the time, this network hadn't been built and few of the set-top-boxes on the market would be able to receive its broadcasts. On 8 September 2008 The Voice TV ended its transmissions in the terrestrial network.

The programming consisted mainly of music videos and the channel is linked to the radio network The Voice Hiphop & RnB Sweden.

Programs that featured on the channel include:

- Planet Voice
- Top 20 Listan
- Your Voice
- Killer Karaoke
- Vi Älskar Musik
- Kodjos värld
