= TV4 Sport =

- Country: Sweden
- Broadcast area: Sweden
- Headquarters: Stockholm

Ownership
- Owner: TV4 Gruppen (66.2%); Expressen(33.8%)

History
- Launched: 17 March 2005
- Closed: 31 January 2018
- Former names: Sport-Expressen; TV4 Sport-Expressen

Availability

Terrestrial
- Boxer: Channel 18

TV4 Sport was a Swedish sports television channel owned by television company TV4 AB, with the tabloid newspaper Expressen owning a minor share. In April 2014, a sports channel similar to TV4 Sport is launched as TV12 by the same company, replacing sv:TV4 Sport Xtra. This channel was previously called TV4 Sport Xtra, with the name changed to TV4 Sport as TV12 was launched).

== History ==
The channel was originally owned by Expressen who launched the channel on 17 March 2005. It was initially available in the analogue basic package from UPC cable, the digital "Medium" package from Com Hem and the "Family" package from Canal Digital on satellite. Sports rights used by the channel included matches from the football series Superettan and the Wimbledon.

In May 2006, it was announced that TV4 AB bought a majority stake in the channel. The channel relaunched as "TV4 Sport-Expressen" with a new logo on 1 June. The deal meant that Sport-Expressen could use several sports rights held by TV4, including reruns of games from the 2006 FIFA World Cup.

Another change was announced in May 2007. TV4 AB had increased their ownership 66.2 percent. This will see the channel relaunch in September as "TV4 Sport". With the relaunch, it will take the space in the Com Hem basic package previously occupied by Eurosport, thereby increasing the penetration for the channel while decreasing it for a major competitor. It will also get a slightly broader content by introducing series and documentaries related to sports.

The change was successful in increasing the ratings for TV4 Sport. In April 2008, TV4 Sport passed Eurosport as the most watched sports channel in Sweden. In January 2008, the channel was launched on the Viasat satellite platform.

By the end of March 2008, TV4 received a licence to broadcast the channel in the Swedish digital terrestrial television network. The licence was valid from 1 April, but it didn't launch immediately, partly due to a disagreement between TV4 and Boxer over the pricing of the channel. TV4 Sport was finally launched on 11 May 2008, after TV4 and Boxer had reached an agreement that would make the channel available until 30 September.

== Programming ==
=== Football ===
- UEFA Europa League
- (Sweden) Superettan
- (Sweden) Swedish Cup
- (Sweden) Damallsvenskan
- (England) Football League Championship
- (England) Football League One
- (Italy) Serie A TIM
- (Spain) Copa del Rey
- (Netherlands) Eredivisie
- (France) Ligue 1

=== Other sports ===
- (United States) UFC
- (Sweden) SHL of ice hockey (finals)
- (Sweden) Elitserien of bandy
- (Sweden) Swedish Super League of floorball
- (Sweden) Table Tennis League
- (Germany) Bundesliga of handball
