= Minimello =

Swedish children's television show

Minimello was a Swedish television programme for children produced by SVT, created and hosted by Ylva Hällen and shown on Barnkanalen. The programme features dolls made from used toilet rolls, which have been decorated and sent in by young viewers. The dolls are judged, and the 16 best compete in a singing contest. The songs, specially composed for the contest, are sung by well-known Swedish singers. The performances are watched by a studio audience, of toilet rolls. The viewers vote for their favourite songs on the Minimello website (about 1 million votes/weekend). It has been described as "The Voice with toilet rolls".

The programme started in 2009, when its page was SVT's most-visited programme page. In 2014 more than 10,000 toilet rolls were submitted for the competition. A total of 35,000 rolls have been entered since the competition began, many handed to Ylva Hällen personally during her tours of the country.

== Voting system ==
The winners are decided by both studio juries and viewers, with weekly competitions leading to a Grand Finale. As of October 2014 over 1 million votes are cast each week. Winners have included Rock Band Tures with "Stopp!", Princesses Mia and Pia, with "Bom Bom Bom", Saga-Linnéa with "Hundis", Babyrose with "Jag är Babyrose", Gold Guy (Guldkillen) with "La Discoteca" and Nelia with "Livet ut".
