= Comedy Central (Sweden) =

Former Swedish TV channel

- Country: Sweden
- Network: Comedy Central

Ownership
- Owner: ViacomCBS Networks EMEAA

History
- Launched: January 1, 2009
- Closed: January 15, 2019
- Replaced by: Paramount Network

Links
- Website: http://www.comedycentral.se/

Comedy Central (Swedish: Comedy Central Sverige) was a Swedish television channel owned by Paramount Networks EMEAA. Viacom International Media Networks have said that the channel will feature both original Swedish productions made for the channel and imported content.

The channel applied for license to broadcast in the terrestrial network in Sweden in February 2008 and on March 27, 2008 they were granted a license to broadcast nationally between 7 p.m. and 3 a.m. (initially timesharing with Nickelodeon) from January 1, 2009.

Logo used at launch.

The channel launched on January 1, 2009, opening with an episode of South Park and the Comedy Central Roast of Pamela Anderson. During its first month, the channel launched on Boxer, Canal Digital, Com Hem, Tele2, Telia Digital-tv, SPA, Borderlight and IP Sweden. The channel was added to the Viasat platform on September 1, 2009.

On October 5, 2010, The Daily Show premiered on Comedy Central in Sweden, having previously been broadcast on Canal+ and Kanal 9. The show is broadcast at 7 p.m. Swedish time, only 14 hours after its original U.S. broadcast, and then repeated at 11.05 p.m. This is unusually fast as American talk shows are normally shown with a one-week delay in Sweden.

After almost 5 years of timesharing with Nickelodeon, Comedy Central got a separate channel in November 1, 2013.

The channel ceased broadcasting on January 15, 2019, being replaced by Paramount Network.

== Programming ==
=== Final programming ===
- Will & Grace
- Futurama
- Workaholics
- Punk'd
- Jeff & Some Aliens
- South Park

=== Former programming ===
Sources:

- 3rd Rock from the Sun
- 8 Simple Rules
- According to Jim
- Adam Devine's House Party
- American Dad!
- Archer
- Baby Daddy
- Becker
- The Ben Show
- Big Time in Hollywood, FL
- Broad City
- Brooklyn Nine-Nine
- Brotherhood
- The Burn with Jeff Ross
- Californication
- Carpoolers
- The Cleveland Show
- The Colbert Report (Global Edition)
- Comedy Central Roast
- Community
- Dead Like Me
- Dharma & Greg
- Dirty Sexy Funny
- Everybody Hates Chris
- Everybody Loves Raymond
- Family Guy
- Fat for Fun
- Frasier
- I Live with Models
- Important Things with Demetri Martin
- Inside Amy Schumer
- Insomniac with Dave Attell
- The Jeff Dunham Show
- Jon Benjamin Has a Van
- Just for Laughs Festival
- Kenny vs. Spenny
- Key & Peele
- The King of Queens
- Malcolm in the Middle
- Mash Up
- Melissa & Joey
- Mind of Mencia
- Monk
- Moonbeam City
- Mulaney
- New Kids
- The Office (US)
- Out of Practice
- Popoz
- Real Husbands of Hollywood
- Review
- Rules Of Engagement
- The Sarah Silverman Program
- Sex and the City
- Stand-Up Saturday
- 'Til Death
- Tosh.0
- TripTank
- Ugly Americans
- Unhappily Ever After
- Workaholics
