= Sid Sutton =

British graphic designer (1939–2023)

- Born: Sidney Malcolm Sutton; 23 August 1939; Hendon, Middlesex, England
- Died: 27 June 2023 (aged 83)
- Occupation: Graphic designer

Sidney Malcolm Sutton (23 August 1939 – 27 June 2023) was a British graphic designer most famous for designing the Doctor Who title sequences from 1980 until 1986. He joined the BBC in 1961, as assistant to Tom Taylor. In 1968 he was appointed Senior Designer for Presentation Graphics.

In 1969 he designed the "rotating globe" ident for BBC television, which was used until 1984 at least.

Sutton was seen on camera as a magician in the title sequence he made for the programme "For My Next Trick" in 1975.

The title sequences for Doctor Who were the starfield versions and were used from The Leisure Hive until the end of The Trial of a Time Lord. For 1987's Time and the Rani, Oliver Elmes designed the titles. Sutton also provided the cover designs for the earliest BBC VHS Video Doctor Who releases, including The Seeds of Death and Day of the Daleks. Sutton discusses his work in a short documentary, "Synthesizing Starfields", provided as an extra feature on the DVD release of the series The Leisure Hive.

SVT1 and SVT2 logos, designed by Sutton, used from October 1980 to 7 January 1996.

Sutton also created logos for Sveriges Television, which appeared in October 1980.

Immediately prior to his work on Doctor Who, he had been nominated for a BAFTA for his graphics on the Robert Banks Stewart-created Shoestring that was a precursor to Bergerac, another show for which he provided the titles.

An archive of his work for the BBC is held at Ravensbourne University London.

Sutton died on 27 June 2023.
