= TNT (Swedish TV channel) =

- Country: Sweden
- Broadcast area: Nordic countries
- Headquarters: Stockholm

Ownership
- Owner: Turner Broadcasting System Europe

History
- Launched: 9 October 2006
- Closed: 1 February 2019
- Former names: Storstads-tv (working title); Aftonbladet TV7 (2006-2008); TV7 (2008-2011); TNT7 (2011-2012)

Links
- Website: http://www.tnt-tv.se

Availability

Terrestrial
- Digital terrestrial: Channel 15

TNT was a commercial television channel in Sweden. The channel was launched by the tabloid newspaper Aftonbladet as Aftonbladet TV7 on 9 October 2006. Aftonbladet sold the channel in late 2007. In August 2008, it was sold once again and is since owned by NonStop Television. On 2 March 2011 the channel was relaunched as TNT7, following Turner Broadcasting System's purchase of Millennium Media Group, the owner of NonStop Television. The "7" was dropped from the name in 2012.

In October 2018, Turner announced that TNT Nordic would be shut down as a television channel and would be turned into a subscription video on demand (SVOD) platform. The channel was shut down on 1 February 2019.

== History ==
The channel was based on the webcasting service that was launched on Aftonbladet.se a few years earlier.

Aftonbladet applied for a license to broadcast a channel with the working title "Storstads-tv" ("City TV") unencrypted in the Swedish digital terrestrial television network in the autumn of 2005. During the process of reviewing the licenses, Storstads-TV teamed up with Axess TV of the Ax:son Johnsson Foundation. In February 2006, Aftonbladet was granted a license to broadcast on Weekdays. Axess TV would broadcast in the Weekends.

Broadcasting trials started on 29 May 2006 with the name "Aftonbladet TV". During this period, the schedule consisted almost solely of content from the webcasts and reruns.

The full launch as TV7 occurred on 9 October 2006. Within a few weeks the channel launched on satellite from Canal Digital and Viasat and digital cable from Com Hem. The schedule now started at 5 p.m. with continuous live news, weather and entertainment news to 9 p.m. when other programming took over. With the launch of TV7, Aftonbladet adjusted their TV guide by introducing TV7 next to the five largest channels. The evening schedule featured both programmes produced in-house at Aftonbladet and acquired programming, including many British lifestyle programmes.

In January 2007, the channel introduced sports to its newscasts and added some new programmes.

The CEO Stephen Mowbray decided to leave the channel in April 2007. He was replaced by Helena Westin. In August 2007, it was announced that Schibsted intended to sell TV7. The ratings had remained very low and advertising sales never caught up, meaning that Aftonbladet suffered heavy losses from both TV7 and the free newspaper Punkt SE. Aftonbladet would now concentrate on the web television service on their website aftonbladet.se.

On 24 October 2007, it was announced that Aftonbladet would give away the responsibility for TV7 to the venture capital firm C4 Partners. It was reported that until 30 September, the channel had an operating loss of 71 million Swedish kronor. An immediate change was that the news department was shut down the same evening and would be replaced by short news updates without hosts the next day. C4 Partners intends to give the channel a new profile and change it from a free-to-air channel into a pay channel. The owner of C4 Partners, Hans Linder, also owned Xover TV that had previously produced Gameplay, a programme about video games, for TV7. The new owners had plans for turning the channel into a channel dedicated to video games, but did however keep much of the imported programmes.

When new licenses where handed out in March 2008, TV7 would see their broadcasting hours drastically reduced. From 1 April 2008, TV7 would broadcast between 6 a.m. and 7 p.m. every day of the week in the terrestrial network. Between 7 p.m. and 6 a.m. Canal 7 is broadcasting instead of TV7. On 1 January 2009, the channel would get to broadcast during the entire day again, but will be forced to use new compression technology H.264/MPEG-4 AVC. However, due to a dispute between Teracom and the Swedish Post and Telecom Authority, the network where TV7 would broadcast had not yet been built and TV7 hadn't been able to resume broadcasting by May 2009.

In August 2008, it was announced that the channel had been sold once again. The new buyer was NonStop Television, who already owned several other channels such as Star!, Showtime and Silver. They intend to transform it into a pay channel with broad entertainment and launch the channel in Denmark, Norway and Finland. Nonstop soon started transforming the channel by adding two movies per day and some shows from their Star! channel.

The channel was relaunched as a women's channel on Valentine's Day, 14 February 2009. New programmes include Head Case, Paradise Falls, Second Chance, Plastic Makes Perfect and the telenovela Lalola.

Logo from 2006 to 2008

Logo from 2008 to 2011

Logo from 2011 to 2012

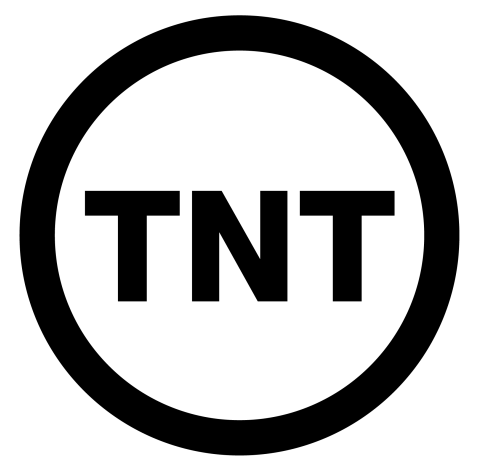
Logo from 2012 to 2017

== Final programming ==
- The Alienist
- Animal Kingdom
- Body of Proof
- Chase
- Chicago Hope
- Claws
- Chicago Justice
- The Closer
- Dallas
- Dark Blue
- The Dead Zone
- Elementary
- Falling Skies
- Franklin & Bash
- Grey's Anatomy
- Hawthorne
- House
- King & Maxwell
- The Last Ship
- Law & Order: Special Victims Unit
- Leverage
- Legends
- Major Crimes
- Memphis Beat
- Men of a Certain Age
- Mob City
- NCIS: Los Angeles
- Perception
- Proof
- Public Morals
- Rizzoli & Isles
- Saving Grace
- Saving Hope
