= Discovery Mix =

Discovery Mix (also known as DiscMix) was a Swedish cable channel owned by Discovery Communications. It carried content from its five channels: Animal Planet, Discovery Channel, Discovery Civilization, Discovery Science and Discovery Travel & Living.

== History ==
The channel started broadcasting on 1 February 2002, replacing Euronews on Com Hem's analogue cable network. Discovery Channel was one of the most popular channels among its subscribers, with a high number of requests to add it to its basic package. The channel aired a selection of programming from the full package, being used as means to entice subscribers to join its digital package. The channel broadcast on average from 7am to 1am. By late 2002, its programmes attracted an audience of up to 45,000 viewers. The channel also made theme weeks drawing in on the combined resources of its channels. Some programmes, especially during primetime, were also simulcast with Discovery Channel's local feed.

In 2007, it was announced that TV8 would take over Discovery Mix's slot. This coincided with the removal of Eurosport from the basic analogue service The changes took place on 1 September; after that, Discovery Mix shut down permanently.
