= Kanal Lokal =

Kanal Lokal ("Channel Local") was the name of four local television channels that started broadcasting in Sweden in early autumn 2005. Kanal Lokal had four different broadcasting areas in the most populated areas of Sweden.

The four Kanal Lokal channels were:

- Kanal Lokal Göteborg, broadcasting to the area surrounding Gothenburg via the Gothenburg, Uddevalla, Trollhättan and Bäckefors transmitters.
- Kanal Lokal Skåne, broadcasting to Scania via the Hörby, Malmö and Helsingborg transmitters.
- Kanal Lokal Stockholm, broadcasting to the Mälardalen region via the Nacka, Västerås, Uppsala and Östhammar transmitters.
- Kanal Lokal Östergötland, broadcasting to Östergötland via the Motala, Linköping and Norrköping transmitters.

Broadcasting areas of the four original Kanal Lokal channels.

== History ==
Kanal Lokal had its origins in NollEttan, a channel that aired in Östergötland. It started broadcasting on the digital terrestrial television network in 1999. In 2005, plans to extend the channel into Stockholm, Scania and Gothenburg materialized. Trials started in Scania under the NollEttan name in the spring. Kanal Lokal Stockholm was launched in September 2005 and was followed in November 2007 when Kanal Lokal Göteborg launched and the two NollEttan channels started using the Kanal Lokal brand.

The company was largely funded by the venture capital firm IT Provider. At launch, Kanal Lokal started to cooperate with the Expressen news paper who provided news for the channel. In October 2005, the company announced that they would broadcast free-to-air.

Kanal Lokal had trouble gaining enough distribution for its channels, especially in the vital Com Hem cable network. In Östergötland, the channel was already available from most cable providers before launch. In April 2006, it was announced that Kanal Lokal had gained a place in the Com Hem basic cable package in Gothenburg. It wasn't until October 2007 that Kanal Lokal became available in the basic analogue Com Hem package in all four markets.

In December 2007, Kanal Lokal terminated its contract with Expressen to provide material for the Stockholm channel. This meant that all programming in the Stockholm channel was cut and replaced by programmes from the other three channels.

In March 2008, Kanal Lokal got its licenses renewed and were also granted several new licenses to broadcast in Småland, Dalarna and parts of Norrland. However, financial woes forced the channel to announce in January 2009 that it had to shut down, and Kanal Lokal went off the air on 19 January 2009.
