= Tvins =

Scandinavian shopping channel

Ownership
- Owner: Thane Direct
- Sister channels: -

History
- Launched: 2004

Links
- Website: Official site

Tvins is a Scandinavian shopping channel broadcasting 24 hours a day.
