= UPC Sweden =

Former Swedish telecommunications cable company

UPC Sverige AB
- Company type: Subsidiary
- Founded: 1985; 41 years ago
- Defunct: 2006
- Successor: Com Hem
- Headquarters: Sweden
- Parent: UPC Broadband

UPC Sweden was a Swedish cable television distributor, mainly active in the Stockholm region. It was the second largest cable network in Sweden before it was integrated into Com Hem in 2006.

It was formed in 1985 by the three estate companies Familjebostäder, Svenska Bostäder and Stockholmshem as StjärnTV. In January 1994, there were plans to sell it to Singapore Telecom International for an undisclosed sum. If successful, this would become the first full cable network owned by the Singaporean company in Europe, as it already had interests in two networks in Yorkshire and Cambridge in the United Kingdom. Approval was passed on 31 October, but it had to be dependent on an appeal process from the Swedish authorities. After nearly a year of appeals, the company was finally under Singaporean hands in late September 1995. SingTel passed it on to Scandinavian Equity Partners in March 1998; at the time, it had 230,000 connected households for a total of 700,000 subscribers. They, now known as EQT Scandinavia, sold it to United Pan-Europe Communications in 1999 who changed the company name to UPC in April 2000, as part of a gradual push to rename all its cable companies under the brand. Under these plans, the country was selected as a test market for the combined digital triple play package Digital television was launched in 2001, but it kept an analogue basic package for its entire existence.

Still under the old name, it added two channels produced by UPC in October 1999, the documentary channel Avante and Extreme Sports Channel. While StjärnTV was evaluating the decision, Extreme Sports was supposed to replace Eurosport, putting the channel at risk on the network.

UPC Sweden ran the risk of falling into bankruptcy from 1 July 2002, a move which would lead to 265,000 cable TV subscribers and 51,000 internet users losing access to its services. The company was facing a crisis, having debts higher than SEK 100 billion. UPC's employees, on the other hand, were confident that the issues would be solved by the scheduled date. Extreme Sports Channel eventually launched in April 2000; Avante was instead replaced by K-World when the decision to add the channels was finally taken.

In April 2006, Liberty Global Europe (formerly UPC) decided to sell many of their assets, including UPC Sweden and UPC Norway. The Swedish part was sold to Carlyle Group and Providence Equity Partners, two American equity firms that also owned Com Hem, the largest cable company in Sweden. The UPC brand was replaced by the Com Hem brand in November and the cable network was technically integrated in April 2007.
