= ZTV (Swedish TV channel) =

- Country: United Kingdom
- Broadcast area: Sweden

Ownership
- Owner: Modern Times Group/Viasat
- Sister channels: TV3, TV6, TV8, Viasat Sport

History
- Launched: 1 May 1992
- Closed: 1 August 2010
- Replaced by: TV6

Links
- Website: http://www.ztv.se/

Availability

Terrestrial
- Boxer TV Access: Channel 41

ZTV was a Swedish television channel owned by Viasat. Launched in February 1991, as a daily afternoon show on TV3 and TV4, it became a channel of its own on Swedish cable networks in May 1992. The intention was to create a Swedish version of MTV and thus the focus was primarily on music, but also had their own comedy-oriented shows, skate and prank related shows and aired various tv shows and movies. Since May 2006, most of its programming composed of music videos. ZTV's last day was August 1, 2010 for all customers except for Boxer and Com Hem, who continued to distribute the channel indefinitely in a limited version. MTG's new sports channel TV10 took over the transmissions of other operators.

== History ==
ZTV was initially also a combined radio station called Z-Radio. The sound from the television programme went out also in radio through a number of commercial radio frequencies around the country. In autumn 1991, Z-Radio started broadcasting in the greater Stockholm area and started broadcasting a television version for TV3 and TV4 in 1991. ZTV began broadcasting on their own channel position on 1 May 1992 and was owned by MTG, who also owned TV3 (Sweden) and TV6 (Sweden). Aside from music videos the channel featured many shows produced in Sweden. Although they were low budget they also featured new ideas and many of them received cult status. Most of the presenters went on to become stars on the major networks with ZTV being viewed as a breeding ground for new talent.

For a few years, there was a Danish ZTV, but it eventually merged with Danish TV6 to form TV3+ and was closed down in 1996. There were also plans to merge the Swedish ZTV with the Swedish TV6, but this never materialised.

In January 1996, it announced an upsize in local content. Jacob Lyth was appointed head of the channel in January 1997.

As the years went on, ZTV moved from Stockholm to London and started broadcasting US imports such as The Late Show with David Letterman and The Simpsons. ZTV started broadcasting 24 hours a day in 2000. In 2002, a Norwegian version of ZTV launched, ZTV Norway.

September 2004 marked a significant change in style for the channel. Instead of being a youth channel, ZTV would now target men. As a result, most of the in-house ZTV shows were cancelled and replaced by Champions League football and wrestling.

In May 2006, MTG started a new channel called TV6. This channel took over most of the programming from ZTV, as well as its frequencies in the cable networks and its subscribers. This meant that ZTV lost all of its distribution.

In late 2006, MTG started a new online venture to allow ZTV to become a youth channel again. ZTV was converted into a multimedia platform (online TV, mobile and broadcasting) with a focus on online TV. A new short TV format (short video clips) introduced to be broadcast on ztv.se including live broadcasting of E-sports (electronic sports) with the possibility of betting on e-sports matches such as Counter Strike.

In late 2007, ZTV started to broadcast various anime series such as Berserk, Black Lagoon, Ergo Proxy, Fullmetal Alchemist, Gungrave, Naruto, Ninja Scroll, Paranoia Agent, and Samurai Champloo.

There was also a Z magazine available for some time.

== Productions ==
- Abrakadabra
- Arkiv Z
- Avspark
- Babbla med Babsan
- Bacon
- Bambola
- Baren Direkt
- Beckerell
- Blommor & Bin
- Bio
- Biocheck
- Biotoppen
- Boys in da House
- Bumtsibum
- Centrum
- Citykaos
- Clubhopping
- Cumbaya
- Crossfade
- Diskus
- E
- Edge
- Efter plugget
- En präst i natten
- Estrad
- Favoriter
- FC Z
- Filmjournalen
- Flavor of the Week
- Folklistan
- Funhouse
- Färg TV
- HC Z
- Hemkunskap
- Hemma Hos
- Hip-Hop och Soul
- Homogen
- Humlan
- Hultsfredsfestivalen
- Jag, Peter
- Jolanda den tredje
- Josefins värld
- JustD-TV
- Kalender für alle
- Kamikaze
- Knesset
- Kollo
- Kompis
- Lobby
- Locash
- Lyckochansen
- Lördagsmoss
- Maffia
- Mamma, det är en kändis i köket!
- Massa
- Megafestival
- Matprat med Peter Gaszynski och Mikael Karis
- Moment 21
- Morronmix
- MorronZoo
- Musikmagasinet
- Musikmagasinet Rock
- Musikredaktionen rekommenderar
- Nattmusik
- OSA
- Parasoll
- Pepsi Live
- Peter, khakimannen
- Plektrum
- Pole Position
- Pop TV
- Pyjamas
- På drift
- På riktigt
- Rallarsving
- Recensenten
- Redaktionen
- Redaktören
- Rock Steady Crew
- Samantha
- Sandal
- Sanning & Konsekvens
- Scandinavian Top 20
- Sexuellt
- Sommarstad Gotland
- Streetsmart
- Swedish Dance Chart
- Swedish Dance Music Awards
- Svärje
- Techno
- Terror TV
- The White Room
- 1200
- Tommy
- Tommy på duken
- Toppen
- Tribut
- Tryck till
- Tullhus 2
- TV für Alle
- TV-huset
- Tryck till
- Uppladdat
- Veckans hitvarning
- Ventil
- Videosnack
- Vinterstad Åre
- Världens bästa musik
- Västmannagatan 44A
- Wimans
- Wimans 2
- Zapp!
- Z Film
- ZTV-nytt
- ztv.se
- ZTV Presenterar
- ZTV på väg
- 800 Grader
- Äntligen Fredag
- Önska@ZTV

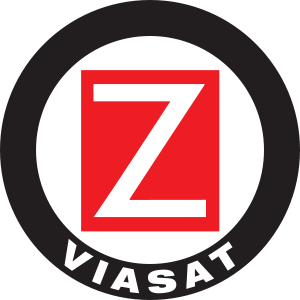
ZTV's original red logo.

== In popular culture ==
ZTV was the topic of a 2026 SVT documentary series, ZTV – det stora tv-experimentet (ZTV: The Great TV Experiment), which was followed in May of that year by a two-episode revival of its talk show Knesset..

== See also ==
- TV3
- TV8
- TV1000
- Modern Times Group
- List of Swedish television channels
