= TV12 (Sweden) =

Swedish television channel

- Country: Sweden

Ownership
- Owner: TV4 AB (Schibsted)
- Sister channels: TV4; Sjuan; TV4 Film; TV4 Fakta; TV4 Guld; TV4 Hits; TV4 Stars; SF-kanalen; TV4 Sportkanalen; TV4 Fotboll; TV4 Hockey; TV4 Motor; TV4 Tennis; TV4 Sport Live

History
- Launched: 29 March 2014

Availability

Terrestrial
- Boxer TV Access: Channel 12

TV12 is a Swedish lifestyle and sport television channel owned by TV4 AB, consisting mainly of reality shows. The channel targets both male and female audiences.

It was first announced on 13 November 2013 after extending its agreement to carry Ligue 1 for the 2014-2015 season. Unlike previous seasons, where the French league was carried on TV4 Sport, the matches would move to the new channel: TV12. The plan was to launch it in the spring of 2014, covering 75 to 80% of the Swedish population.

The channel launched on 29 March 2014 with an airing of the film Rocky.

On 17 June 2015, the channel unveiled a new logo, coinciding with the beginning of the 2015 UEFA European Under-21 Championship. The rebrand caused TV12 to air comedy programmes and increase the proportion of movies shown, to reposition itself as a wider entertainment channel. It achieved its record viewership on 4 January 2016, when Sweden played against Finland in the 2016 World Junior Ice Hockey Championships semifinals.

In October 2016, the group bought the rights to air the 2016 FIFA U-20 Women's World Cup held in Papua New Guinea, with the finals airing on TV12.

From 1 April 2021, the channel was added to Com Hem's basic package after the signing of a new agreement.
