= TV4 Komedi =

- Country: Sweden

Ownership
- Owner: TV4 AB

History
- Launched: 3 November 2006
- Closed: 30 September 2017

Links
- Website: www.tv4.se/tv4komedi

TV4 Komedi was a sister subchannel of Swedish TV4, owned by TV4 Group. The channel focuses on comedy only with sitcoms, comedy shows and talk shows. The channel airs classic sitcoms like ALF, Family Matters, Cheers, Hope & Faith, Roseanne, Will & Grace, The Golden Girls together with newer shows such as the Late Show with David Letterman, 30 Rock and Parks and Recreation.

== History ==
The channel was launched on November 3, 2006 along with TV4 Guld. The first programme aired on the channel was Father of the Bride Part II.

On its launch, both TV4 Guld and TV4 Komedi were available on Com Hem's digital cable TV and Canal Digital's satellite package. Since September 2009, the two channels are available to Viasat subscribers.

The channel was commercial-free until the channel introduced commercial breaks in January 2012.

TV4 Komedi ceased its broadcasting on September 30, 2017 along with TV4 Fakta XL. The last programme aired on the channel was Åsa-Nisse flyger I luften. The closure was part of a broader cost-cutting plan.
