= Teracom =

Swedish state-owned communications company

Teracom Group AB
- Founded: 1992; 34 years ago
- Founder: Televerket
- Website: teracom.se

Teracom Group AB is a Swedish state-owned company that delivers information and communication services aimed at operators of essential functions within the Swedish civilian and military systems.

Teracom was established in 1992, as a spin-off from the Swedish Televerket telecommunications agency, ahead of its corporatisation into the Swedish incumbent operator Telia. The reason behind the spin-off was to separate what became Teracom from the commercial aspect of the now-deregulated Swedish telecom business. In October 2018, Teracom sold its Danish subsidiary (Teracom A/S) to the London-based investment company Agilitas Private Equity LLP, which subsequently changed the latter's name to Cibicom A/S in January 2019. In 2019, Teracom acquired the Swedish subsidiary of the mobile wireless broadband operator Net 1, now Teracom Mobil AB. The background to Teracom's acquisition of Net 1 was to secure telecommunications via mobile broadband to authorities and companies via the 450 MHz band with government control and in the long term.

== See also ==
- List of Swedish government enterprises
- Digital terrestrial television in Sweden
