= C More Emotion =

Scandinavian premium television channel

Ownership
- Owner: C More Entertainment

History
- Launched: June 1, 2011
- Replaced: Canal+ Drama
- Closed: September 1, 2016
- Replaced by: C More Stars
- Former names: Canal+ Emotion (2011-2012)

C More Emotion was a Scandinavian premium television channel showing movies aimed at women.

On September 1, 2016 C More Emotion merged with C More Action into a new channel called C More Stars.
