= SVT24 =

Swedish television channel

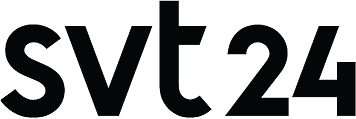
- Country: Sweden

Programming
- Picture format: 16:9 (576i, SDTV)

Ownership
- Owner: Sveriges Television
- Sister channels: SVT1, SVT2, SVT Barn, Kunskapskanalen

History
- Launched: 15 March 1999; 27 years ago
- Former names: svt 24 (2001–2003); 24 (2003–2007)

Availability

Terrestrial
- DTT (Sweden): Channel 98

Streaming media
- SVT Play: www.svtplay.se/kanaler/svt24 (only in Sweden)

SVT24, stylized as svt24, formerly known as SVT 24 (then stylized svt 24) or 24 is a Swedish language TV channel broadcast by Sveriges Television (SVT). It started broadcasting in 1999 as a dedicated news channel. In 2003 it extended its scope to include other current events-related programmes and sports at the weekend. Nowadays the channel mainly consists of news, sports, and entertainment programmes with a focus on reruns from SVT1 and SVT2.

== History ==
SVT24 launched on 15 March 1999 at 13:15. It started with a news summary followed by an official opening by the CEO of SVT. In the beginning, SVT24 simulcasted with other channels a lot of the time, first on SVT2 and in the summer on SVT1. SVT24 has to take care of extended broadcasts in case of special events.

The channel broadcast news every fifteen minutes throughout the weekday. However, there were no broadcasts on the weekends and the nightly broadcasts started some months later. At :00 and :30 SVT24 showed longer bulletins, but the :15 and :45 broadcasts were just news summaries. The channel also broadcast business news twice every hour, many weather forecasts, reports from the Nordic countries, and other featured stories. The material was mostly picked up from other news programmes. The idea of the channel was to provide news for quick periods of time, comparable to teletext, but with moving images. Still, the concept behind the channel was seen with criticism from Swedish journalists, given the relative "speed" of its programming.

SVT24 used digital technology for broadcasting, so a bulletin from SVT24 was much cheaper to broadcast than a bulletin from Rapport or Aktuellt. That's why during 1999 and 2000 SVT24 took over all the short bulletins from Rapport and the morning programme was moved to the SVT24 studio. In 2000 SVT24 merged with Rapport and Aktuellt into one central newsdesk. After some time, the channel was hit by cost savings. All broadcasts between 09:30 and 16:00 ceased for some time and the business news disappeared.

On 8 September 2001, Aktuellt and Rapport moved to a new common studio and got a graphical make-over. That meant that all bulletins in SVT1 got the Rapport brand, making SVT24 only broadcasting digitally (and on SVT1 at night). SVT24 moved into the common studio a week later. In the end of 2002, SVT declared that they were going to launch two new channels. That meant that SVT24 was about to be merged with SVT Extra into a new channel, called only 24. 24 would include a wider range of programmes than SVT24 did, including acquired programming, sports events, and weekend broadcasts.

The new channel was launched on 24 February 2003. It consisted of short three-minute bulletins from Rapport every half-hour. Between these many different programs were shown. In the day-time, this consisted of 24 Direkt ("24 Live", Swedish version of C-SPAN), 24 Måndag-Fredag ("24 Monday-Friday"), and reruns of the evening programmes. The prime time show at 20:00 was 24 minuter ("24 minutes"), a daily chat show hosted by Claes Elfsberg. Other prime-time shows included 24 Nöje ("24 Entertainment"), 24 Konsument ("24 Consumer"), Sverige Nu ("Sweden Now"), and acquired programming such as Saturday Night Live, documentaries and World News from BBC World. During the weekends, the "interactive news service" 24 Vision and sports events were shown. The relaunch also caused the closure of the full-time SVT Extra, which was only reserved for special events. The new logo was designed by Wirström Design; green and gray became the channel's new signature colours.

In the autumn of 2003, the channel was hit by cost savings. The short bulletins were now only shown every hour in the daytime and 24 Direkt started occupying the rest of the day-time schedule. New shows included a taped radio show, Lantz i P3. In 2004 the acquired programming and BBC World disappeared. 24 Konsument and 24 Nöje were however transformed into daily newscasts and sports bulletins were included in the evening.

In 2005, the simulcasts of Rapport at 19:30 and Aktuellt at 18:00 and 21:00 ended and were replaced by mostly reruns of current affairs-based programmes from SVT1 and SVT2. 24 Konsument was axed in late 2005 and in 2006 24 Nöje rebranded as Nöjesnytt with bulletins on both SVT1 (in the morning) and SVT2 (in the evening). The channel became subject to must carry laws effective 1 July 2005 and SVT and UR subsequently agreed to have the channel carried on the basic analogue cable services of UPC Sweden and Com Hem.

The ratings for the channel had been very modest from the start. 2006 did however mean a significant increase in the viewing. For the full year of 2005, the average Swede watched SVT24 for 0.7 minutes per day. For November 2006 this had doubled to 1.4 minutes. The next month, December 2006, the rating doubled once again, averaging 2.8 minutes per day and viewers, for the first time making SVT24 one of the ten most watched channels in Sweden. (Source: Mediamätning i Skandinavien)

SVT decided in October 2006 to proceed to a series of cuts to change the channel's format from rolling news to repeats from the two main SVT channels.

In December 2006, the daily current affairs show Studio 24 got axed because of budget cuts at the SVT news department. Sverige Nu was also axed. The channel was relaunched in January 2007. The new evening schedule mainly consists of reruns of programmes from SVT1 and SVT2 and a half-hour news bulletin from Rapport with Nöjesnytt at 21:30. 24 Direkt, the sports broadcasts and news updates were retained.

On 18 January 2010, Kunskapskanalen began sharing channel space with SVT24 and SVT Barnkanalen, and at the same time 24 Direkt was renamed SVT Forum and shifted to Kunskapskanalen. Under the current arrangement, SVT24 is aired from 20:00 until 05:00 the next day, with SVT Barnkanalen and Kunskapskanalen occupying the morning, afternoon, and early evening slots.

On 25 November 2013, SVT announced its intention to launch a high-definition (HD) simulcast of SVT24.

== Name ==
The channel started as SVT24, and as SVT 24 on 8 September 2001, but was renamed 24 in 2003. This name was however hard to use, so variants such as 24:an ("the 24") occurred along with the old name. About a year later the name SVT24 appeared in EPGs and programme schedules.

== Logos and identities ==
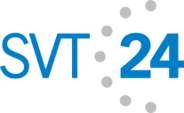
SVT24's first logo from 1999 to 2001, there is the word SVT in blue text, and to the right of it there are seven gray dots and on the right of them is the number 24 on blue and bolder text.

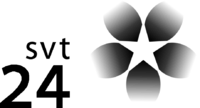
SVT24's second logo from 2001 to 2003, on the left of the logo, is the word SVT and the number 24 in black text, and the north-eastern part of the logo is 5 black petals with a star in the middle.

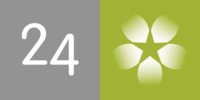
SVT24's third logo from 2003 to 2007 was designed by Wirström Design, the logo includes a gray square with the number 24 on it and a green square with petals and a star in the center of it.

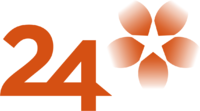
SVT24's fourth logo from 2007 to 2008 designed and made by Kaktus Film in 2007, there is the number 24 in brown text, and above them are 5 brown petals with a star in the middle.

SVT24's fifth and previous logo on a brown rectangle was used until 4 March 2012.

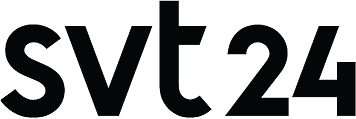
SVT24's sixth and current logo since 25 November 2016.

== Distribution ==
The channel is broadcast free-to-air in the digital terrestrial television network in Sweden and Åland. Satellite transmissions are from the Thor and Sirius satellites, but are encrypted. A decoding card from Viasat or Canal Digital is needed to view the channel. The two largest cable networks (Com Hem and UPC) broadcast the analogue version of the channel.
