= C More Kids =

Ownership
- Owner: C More Entertainment

History
- Launched: 1 June 2011
- Closed: 1 February 2015
- Former names: Canal+ Family (2011-2012)

Links
- Website: Norwegian site Swedish site Danish site Finnish site

C More Kids was a Scandinavian premium television channel showing family movies and programs from CBeebies. The channel was closed 1 February 2015. The content previously shown on the channel is available in the C More Play on demand streaming library.

The channel broadcast from 6.30 a.m. to 10 p.m.
