= SVT Barn =

Swedish children's television channel

- Country: Sweden
- Broadcast area: Sweden, Åland, and Ostrobothnia, reaching bordering regions via overspill of their terrestrial networks

Programming
- Picture format: 1080i HDTV (downscaled to 16:9 576i for the SDTV feed)

Ownership
- Owner: Sveriges Television
- Sister channels: SVT1, SVT2, Kunskapskanalen, SVT24

History
- Launched: 23 December 2002; 23 years ago
- Former names: Barnkanalen (2002–2006); SVTB (2008–2012); SVT Barnkanalen (2006–2008, 2012–2019)

Links
- Website: www.svtbarn.se

Availability

Terrestrial
- DTT (Sweden): Channel 98

Streaming media
- SVT Play: www.svtplay.se/kanaler/svtbarn (only in Sweden)

SVT Barn (lit. 'SVT Children' or 'SVT Kids'), formerly Barnkanalen (lit. 'the children['s] channel') and SVT B, is a Swedish free-to-air television channel from state broadcaster Sveriges Television dedicated to children's television programming. In the first semester of 2023 alone, SVT Barn had a daily reach of viewers exceeding 100 times the volume that Disney Channel has in Sweden.

== History ==
SVT Barn, then known as Barnkanalen, was first announced in May 2002, alongside the conversion of SVT24 into a true 24/7 channel. Production began in August, then the launch was announced in November and started broadcasting on 23 December 2002. The channel was an alternative to the established commercial children's channels (considering that its values differed from SVT's), with emphasis on viewer interaction, as well as content sent in from kindergartens and schools. During its first year it was only available from 6.30 a.m. to 6.00 p.m. on weekdays; after which viewers would switch to Bolibompa on SVT1 from 6pm, as the channel was devised as a complement to the channel's children's programming. Moreover, Nickelodeon and Fox Kids closed at 6pm (Cartoon Network was already 24/7 on some providers), which justified the closing time. New shows at launch time included Angela Anaconda, The Zack Files, The Story of Tracy Beaker, Engie Benjy, as well as the online programme Twebby and Mobilen, the latter of which toured Sweden and visited kindergartens and schools. During the 2002-2003 Christmas holidays, the channel's programming was simulcast on SVT1 on certain days and timeslots. The channel also took a "summer vacation" between 23 May and 18 August. The rest of the time could be used for other programming; some weekends, one could see tennis in the schedule.

The programming was aimed at pre-school children in the mornings and the afternoon programming was targeted at older children (pre-teens). The morning block featured special announcers that presented programmes from "the TV ship". Right after it had finished, the morning programmes would rerun immediately. At 1.00 p.m., an interactive show called Twebby was broadcast, followed by programmes for older children presented by two animated continuity announcers called "Joppe and Nella" (voiced by Niklas Atterhall and Gabriella Wessman respectively). The live announcements were animated using technology from Danish company TV-Animation in which the animation synchronised with the voices with 20mm precision. Both voice actors were SVT continuity announcers; Niklas worked for SVT2 and Gabriella, for SVT1. Afternoon programming included animation, English language programming as well as dramas from the SVT archives.

On 1 November 2003, the channel started broadcasting on weekends, from 7.00 a.m.. From 2004, SVT Barn would be a full year service.

During the 2004 Summer Olympics and the 2004 Summer Paralympics, SVT Extra would simulcast with SVT Barn in the evenings and from 27 September 2004, the evening slot would be occupied by Kunskapskanalen.

The TV ship was removed in the autumn of 2005 and its presenters was integrated with Bolibompa, the evening children strand on SVT1. Bolibompa would from then be the brand for pre-school programming on SVT Barn as well. Twebby was discontinued later in the autumn.

In February 2006, SVT Barn got new graphics and Joppe and Nella were removed. Instead, a new show called Bobster was shown between the programmes in the afternoon. Bobster would also broadcast between 7 p.m. and 7.30 p.m. in SVT1.

On 27 August 2007, SVT Barn started its broadcasting hours extended to 7 p.m., allowing Bobster to broadcast for another hour. On 25 August 2008 SVT made a major reshuffle in its schedules. This meant that the primetime broadcasts from Bolibompa at 6 p.m. and Bobster at 7 p.m. that were previously broadcast on SVT1 would be moved to SVT Barn. SVT Barn was upgraded as one of the three main channels from SVT, meaning that the channel would receive most of SVT's funding for children's programmes. With the reorganization, SVT Barn was given a new look. The new logo reads "SVTB", but it is still referred to as "Barnkanalen".

SVTB would now start every day at 6.30 a.m. with programmes aimed at pre-schoolers under the Bolibompa brand. This includes presenter-lead segments called Bolibompamorgon between 7 a.m. and 8.30 a.m. on Weekdays and Bolibompahelg between 8 a.m. and 10 p.m. on Weekends. Bolibompa continues until 3 p.m. when Bobster for the older children starts. On Weekends, Bobster starts at 2 p.m. Bobster also includes a news update from Lilla Aktuellt every weekday at 4 p.m. The primetime edition of Bolibompa broadcast between 6 p.m. and 7 p.m. This is followed by Bobster between 7 p.m. and 8 p.m.

The name Barnkanalen (although this time styled as SVT Barnkanalen) returned in June 2012 with a new look devised by Trollbäck + Company

In January 2015, the channel released a viral music video (Snoppen och snippan) featuring abstract representations of genitalia, amassing a million views on YouTube between 8 and 13 January. The release of the song caused moral panic on social media from concerned parents, with some raising concerns about its lack of educational value. Its composer Johan Holmström reacted by saying that the negative reactions were due to its visuals.

On 18 June 2019, Barnkanalen became SVT Barn.

== Logos and identities ==
SVT Barnkanalen's third logo used from 25 August 2008 to 10 June 2012.

SVT Barnkanalen's fourth logo used from 11 June 2012 to 18 June 2019.

Stacked version of SVT Barnkanalen's fourth logo with a modified SVT trademark from 2016.

== Programming ==
=== Pre-schoolers ===
Since the programming in the mornings is mostly aimed at preschoolers, it is either Swedish language in original, dubbed into Swedish or silent. In the past, they mostly aired older programming in the mornings such as Professor Balthazar, Doctor Snuggles and the Alfons Åberg films. Pingu was also aired on Barnkanalen. This was because it was expensive to dub foreign series and create new programs.

However, in the 2000s, 2010s, and 2020s, more recent imported series dubbed into Swedish, such as Bitz & Bob and Elinor Wonders Why and other popular PBS shows of 2020, as well as local productions, began to air. They continue to air, and new dubs continue being made, to this day.

=== Pre-teens and teens ===
In the 1990s and 2000s, Barnkanalen also showed some animation aimed at older children with their original soundtracks, for example the foreign anime Cardcaptors and imported US Animaniacs and AAAHH!!! Real Monsters. Notably, there is a version of Real Monsters dubbed into Swedish, but it was only shown on the competing satellite channel Nickelodeon Scandinavia at the time. Other animated programmes aired during this time included the animated Mr. Bean, Garfield and Friends, Code Lyoko, Martin Mystery, The Three Friends and Jerry, The Rubbish World of Dave Spud and Oggy and the Cockroaches.

In the later half of the 2000s to the 2010s, animated series aimed at older children acquired from countries around the world started to air with Swedish dubbing. They continue to air, and new dubs continue being made, to this day.

Other acquired programming includes drama series from each country, such as Australia, the US, the United Kingdom, the Netherlands, Canada, France, and Germany.

The many Australian drama series shown in the channel included Mirror, Mirror, Search for Treasure Island, Home Farm Twins, The Saddle Club and Ocean Star. US shows include PBS series such as Ramona and Nickelodeon series The Secret World of Alex Mack. From Britain comes the Central series Woof! and Press Gang. Many live action shows that were once broadcast with their original soundtracks have been broadcast with Swedish dubbing in recent years.

Between 2011 and 2014, Barnkanalen was responsible for airing the Junior Eurovision Song Contest after previously having been aired on SVT 1.

== Availability ==
Initially Barnkanalen was available on satellite from Canal Digital, on certain digital cable distributors, and free-to-air in the digital terrestrial network, being the first channel to broadcast without encryption in the platform. An agreement of distribution on the Viasat satellite platform was settled in 2003. A few days earlier, SVT had decided to allow cable providers to transform the channel and convert it to analogue PAL in their systems.

Many cable companies used copyright issues motivate an additional fee for the channel. An agreement that would make SVT pay the copyright costs was made some years later and made Barnkanalen (as well as Kunskapskanalen and SVT24) available in the analogue basic packages on the two major cable providers, UPC Sweden and Com Hem, from 1 July 2005. This increased the penetration of the channel dramatically.
