= TV4 Fakta XL =

- Country: Sweden

Ownership
- Owner: TV4
- Sister channels: TV4

History
- Launched: 13 August 2012
- Closed: 30 September 2017

Links
- Website: www.tv4.se

TV4 FaktaXL was a Swedish factual television channel owned and operated by the TV4 Group and was a sister channel of TV4 Fakta. It started broadcasting in August 2012 replacing the now closed TV4 Science Fiction.

The channel broadcasts factual programs involving the world, humanity and technology.

Many of the programs shown on TV4 Fakta XL were purchased from the UK, Australia, Canada, France and Denmark. It also airs Swedish-produced programs and films which they accounted for about 10 percent of the offering.

The channel ends its broadcasts on September 30, 2017 alongside its comedy channel, TV4 Komedi. The closure was part of a broader cost-cutting plan.
