= Axess TV =

Swedish television channel

- Country: Sweden

Programming
- Picture format: 576i (SDTV)

Ownership
- Owner: Axel and Margaret Ax:son Johnson Foundation

History
- Launched: 27 May 2006

Links
- Website: www.axess.se

Availability

Terrestrial
- Digital terrestrial: Channel 25

Axess TV is a Swedish television channel belonging to the Axel and Margaret Ax:son Johnson Foundation. It is mainly devoted to cultural and science programmes. The Ax:son Johnson Foundation applied for a license to broadcast in the Swedish digital terrestrial television network in the autumn of 2005. The channel was awarded a license to broadcast free-to-air in the Weekends in February 2006. Trial broadcasts started on 27 May 2006. The first weekend contained the opera Dialogues of the Carmelites, the British sitcom Yes Minister, a discussion programme and a documentary. The channel had a full launch on 23 September 2006. From 1 February 2010 Axess is no longer free-to-air but is available as part of a pay-channel package from Boxer. It has also changed compression to MPEG-4.
