= SVT2 =

Swedish public TV channel

- Country: Sweden
- Broadcast area: Sweden, Åland, and Ostrobothnia, reaching bordering regions via overspill of their terrestrial networks

Programming
- Languages: Swedish; Finnish, including Meänkieli (select programmes); Northern Sámi (select programmes); Romani (select programmes); Yiddish (select programmes); Swedish Sign Language (select programmes); Danish (subtitles for select Swedish original productions)
- Picture format: HDTV (1080i 16:9)

Ownership
- Owner: Sveriges Television
- Sister channels: SVT1, SVT Barn, Kunskapskanalen, SVT24

History
- Launched: 5 December 1969; 56 years ago
- Former names: TV2 (1969–1996)

Links
- Website: https://www.svt.se/

Availability

Terrestrial
- DTT (Sweden): Channel 2 (HD)
- SveaTV (Finland): -

Streaming media
- SVT Play: www.svtplay.se/kanaler/svt2 (only in Sweden)

SVT2 (SVT Två; commonly referred to as Tvåan) is one of the two main television channels broadcast by Sveriges Television in Sweden. Launched in 1969 by Sveriges Radio, the channel was until the 1990s the most watched in Sweden but now serves as SVT's specialist television channel, carrying more highbrow and minority programming compared to the more mainstream SVT1.

== History ==
=== TV2 ===
Debate persisted throughout the 1960s over a second Swedish television channel, following the opening of Radiotjänst TV (later Sveriges Radio TV) in 1956. Some wanted the new channel to be private and funded by advertising, or integrated to the existing channel; but it was decided that the public service broadcaster, Sveriges Radio, would take responsibility, by having two separate structures, one for each channel. Sveriges Radio was the second Nordic broadcaster to launch a second TV channel, after Finland's Yle did so in March 1965.

The creation of a second channel with a separate profile led to an increase in the resources and personnel for television, as means to boost democratic levels in Sweden. During its planning phase, TV2 was widely seen as "radical" in contrast to the existing channel. This raised concerns about political biases, which SR wanted to reduce ahead of launching.

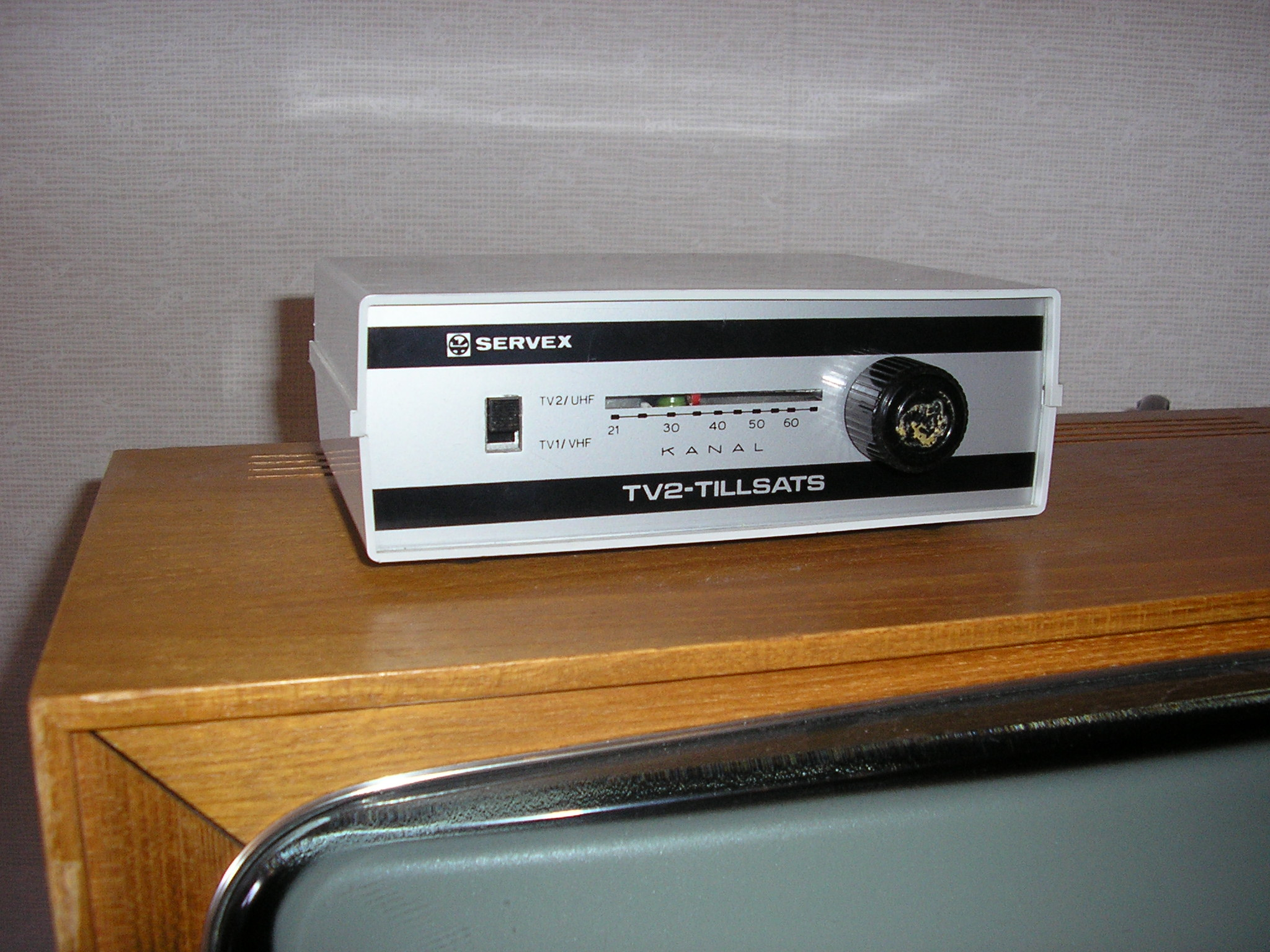
TV2 box used to be able to view the new channel on an old TV set.

TV2 began broadcasting on Friday 5 December 1969 - an occasion known widely as the "channel split" (kanalklyvningen). While TV1 was broadcast on VHF frequencies, TV2 used UHF frequencies, which meant that households had to buy a special converter box if they wanted to see TV2.

At 6am on Friday, 5 December 1969, Carl-Uno Sjöblom started as a "test announcer" with small talk, gramophone music for still images and with some film clips. This continued until 6pm when the service started. Radio manager Olof Rydbeck was given a minute to inaugurate the channel, followed by Les Aventures de Babar, TV-nytt with the first broadcast of Rapport, Moomin in colour, old and new images in colour, the premiere of Direkt - veckan som gick with Åke Ortmark as presenter, and ended with Shirley Bassey and The Young Generation.

From the start, TV2 invested in social and current affairs programs under the title Direkt and were broadcast every weekday evening after TV news at 21:00, including the previously mentioned Direkt – veckan som gick, Direkt – mittiveckan, Direkt – reportage and Direkt – utifrån. The Direkt investment was soon wound down, so when Direkt from outside remained and in the fall of 1970 changed its name to Dokument utifrån.

Although TV2 was part of the same company as TV1, they were both editorially independent and encouraged to compete with each other. Both channels later agreed not to compete directly with similar programmes. For example, the weekend variety shows were aired on TV2 on Friday nights and TV1 on Saturday nights.

Both channels also shared a national news service, TV-nytt, which broadcast short bulletins at 7 pm and 9 pm on TV2 (6 pm, 7.30 pm, and 10 pm on TV1) - accompanying this on TV2 was Rapport, a 20-minute news magazine emphasising in-depth reports, analysis, and commentary. The initial format gave rise to accusations of left-wing bias with TV2 described by some as the red channel. A revamp in 1972 saw Rapport move to 7.30 pm and introduce a broader format, eventually establishing the programme as the most-watched Swedish television news.

During its first year, TV2 was in a build-up phase, which meant, among other things, that it broadcast fewer hours and could not be received by as many as TV1. September 30, 1972 was the day TV2 officially achieved the same broadcast volume as TV1, namely 40 hours a week. There was also a substantial amount of programmes dedicated to social causes, including war protests and solidarity films, raising concerns about SR's political neutrality. Because of the channel's alternative character which inclined more to the political left, the channel was often pejoratively nicknamed "the red channel" (den röta kanalen) in the 1970s. In 1972–1973, TV2 aired feature films from 22 countries, most of which aligned with the Third World, then used to refer to the non-aligned countries. In its early years on air, TV2 halted its transmissions completely during summer.

On September 30, 1972, several extensive changes to the operations were also launched, including TV2's own news program Rapport moving to 19:30, which belonged to TV-nytt and was broadcast on TV1.

As TV2 was broadcast on UHF from the beginning, the channel was able to broadcast regional programming for the first time. In November 1970, the first regional news bulletin, Sydnytt (covering Scania and Blekinge, was launched. In July 1979, both TV1 and TV2 were placed under the management of Sveriges Television (SVT).

TV2 was far from becoming a success in its early years, where it was speculated that one in every three Swedes owned a TV2 converter to receive UHF signals.

Having gradually introduced regional news services across the country, TV2 was relaunched as the Sweden Channel (Sverigekanalen) (Note: In March 2024, a Christian channel created from dissidents of Vision Sverige named SverigeKanalen started broadcasting, though the channel has no relation with SVT2.) on 31 August 1987. As part of a reorganisation, the network's homegrown output consisted largely of programming from SVT's regional production centres (there were ten of them in total, the biggest of them being Gothenburg and Malmö), although some Stockholm-produced output continued, including Rapport. During this phase, the channel was often nicknamed "the hillbilly channel" (bonnakanalen).

The revamp helped to establish TV2 as the most-watched television network in Sweden, although by 1994, the channel lost its lead to commercial network TV4. On the date of its 25th anniversary, the channel did not produce special programming, aside from a special edition of Go'morron Sverige and a ten-minute segment during that evening's edition of Rapport.

=== SVT2 ===
The increasing competition led to a relaunch as SVT2 in 1996, with programming from both Stockholm and the regional centres now shared between both channels. Among the changes, the 6 pm edition of SVT1's news service Aktuellt moved to the channel, while Rapport launched breakfast and lunchtime editions, but also moved some of its shorter bulletins to SVT1.

A major corporate revamp in 2001 saw SVT2 repositioned as a more specialist channel with SVT1 taking a broader, mainstream profile. As part of the revamp, Rapport moved to the first network and the less popular Aktuellt moved to SVT2, initially airing twice nightly at 6 pm and 9 pm. Regional news bulletins continued on SVT2 as before.

Other popular programming on the network (such as Expedition: Robinson) also moved to SVT1, although an effort was made to boost audiences with new programming schedules in 2003. In-vision continuity was abandoned in January 2005 in favour of pre-recorded announcements.

On August 24, 2020, the late local news and Sportnytt moved to SVT1. As a result, regional programs are no longer broadcast on SVT2. The change was partly a cost-cutting measure as it saved money by only having regional opt-outs in one channel compared to two.

== Logos and identities ==
SVT2's second logo was used from 1975 to 1980.

SVT2's third logo, designed by Sid Sutton, used from 1980 to 7 January 1996.

SVT2's sixth logo, used from 1997 to 2001.

SVT2's seventh and previous logo used from 25 August 2008 to 24 November 2016.

SVT2's seventh and previous logo on a basic rectangle was used until 4 March 2012.

HD logo used from 2010 to 2012.

HD logo used from 2012 to 2016.

SVT2's eighth and current logo since 25 November 2016.

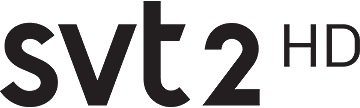
HD logo since 2016.

=== 1980 to 1996 ===
With the introduction of the new SVT name and logo by Sid Sutton, TV2 used a three-striped numeral 2, which was a standalone symbol until the 1996 restructuring.

=== 1996 ===
With the 1996 relaunch, both channels adopted a uniform brand, with SVT2 opting to encase its existing numeral inside a green square. The music for the two channels' branding was composed by Peter Karlsson.

=== 1996 to 2001 ===
SVT changed the identity of its two channels in October 1996. The new music for both channels was composed by Jan Lundqvist at SR Uppland.

=== 2001 to 2008 ===
On 15 January 2001, SVT2 unveiled a new logo featuring a blue square, in line with English & Pockett's redesign of SVT. Blue became the predominant colour of the new identity.

During the summer of 2002, a white background with flowers was used, replaced during autumn by a new set of idents developed by Konstfack students. With the adoption of a new schedule on 7 January 2003, the channel changed its graphics for in-vision continuity, becoming white with some light blue elements. New Konstfack idents were commissioned.

In the autumn of 2004, SVT2 solicited B-Reel for the creation of its new graphics and idents. The idents were based on camera movements in different environments, with a mirror in the middle. In its reflex, a different environment appears. The new look was introduced on 10 January 2005. The new theme was composed by Eric Hector, Magnus Alakangas and Magnus Lindgren.

=== 2008 to 2016 ===
A further revamp in August 2008 saw all regional news services moved to SVT1. Aktuellt relaunched as an in-depth current affairs programme, until March 2012, when the programme was extended to an hour on Mondays-Thursdays, incorporating extended news coverage, sport and a late regional news bulletin. The new look was develoepd by Brokendoll.

The 2012 rebrand was designed by Trollbäck + Company, while the music was composed by Antfood.

=== Since 2016 ===
SVT 2, like all other SVT channels, unveiled a new logo designed by Hapy FB on 25 November 2016.

== Programming ==
Programming on SVT2 is generally more specialist than on the primary SVT1. The station's output includes most of SVT's cultural programming, minority output in the Sami and Finnish languages, sign language programming, independent films, current affairs and parliamentary coverage.

SVT2 does not broadcast 24 hours a day. As of January 2019, SVT2 signs off shortly after 5 am and resumes broadcasting between 8 am and 9 am. During the daytime on most weekdays, SVT Forum, the network's umbrella programme for live current events, airs. A mid-afternoon Rapport bulletin airs at 4 p.m (16:00).

At 5:15 pm (17:15), SVT2 begins its evening schedule with three minority-language news bulletins: Ođđasat (Sami), Nyhetstecken (Swedish Sign Language), and Uutiset (Finnish), followed by a documentary programme. The channel's main news programme, Aktuellt at 9pm (21:00) includes in-depth analysis, interviews, sports updates, cultural and regional news, and weather. Repeats of sports current affairs output air throughout the night.

=== Acquired programming ===
Acquired programming on SVT2 has included If Tomorrow Comes, Six Feet Under, The Sopranos, K Street, Parkinson, The Kumars at No. 42, The Wire, Nip/Tuck and Veronica Mars. It has also included a few daily telenovelas from some European and Latin American countries.

As is the practice with the rest of the Swedish television and film industry, acquired foreign programmes on SVT2 are shown in their respective original language audio with Swedish subtitles.

== International availability ==
=== Norway ===
On 10 September 2010, RiksTV added SVT2 to its basic subscription package, on the grounds that not every Norwegian with a satellite dish had access to it and SVT1. The decision was an about-face compared to its plans in 2007, when it ruled out the inclusion of the two channels on the principles of "complex" rights issues "that it almost requires a lawyer to understand correctly". On 1 November 2012, RiksTV removed the channel from its line-up, being replaced by the Scandinavian feed of BBC Entertainment.

== In popular culture ==
The channel was referenced in a song by pop group Gyllene Tider, Flickorna på TV2 (The Girls on Channel Two), which became a hit.

== See also ==
- SVT1
- List of Swedish television channels
