= Kunskapskanalen =

- Country: Sweden

Programming
- Picture format: 576i (SDTV)

Ownership
- Owner: Sveriges Utbildningsradio; Sveriges Television
- Sister channels: SVT1, SVT2, SVT Barn, SVT24

History
- Launched: 27 September 2004; 21 years ago

Links
- Website: Official website

Availability

Terrestrial
- DTT (Sweden): Channel 99

Streaming media
- SVT Play: www.svtplay.se/kanaler/kunskapskanalen (only in Sweden)

Kunskapskanalen (transl. The Knowledge Channel) is a Swedish television channel operated by Sveriges Television (SVT) and Sveriges Utbildningsradio (UR) broadcasting educational and factual programming. The channel broadcasts between 15:00 and 01:00 on all days of the week, having previously aired between 09:00 and 01:00.

Kunskapskanalen is broadcast by satellite, cable, and digital terrestrial television to Sweden, by cable to Norway and parts of Finland, and terrestrially on Åland. The channel can also be received over DVB-T in Copenhagen due to its proximity to southern Sweden.

== History ==
The channel officially started broadcasting on 27 September 2004, initially only between Sundays and Thursdays. Transmissions on Fridays and Saturdays began in January 2006. On weekdays, UR broadcast between 6-7:30 and 9:30-11 and SVT between 7:30-9:30. On weekends, UR started at 6, handing over to SVT at 9. UR used in-vision presenters for their programs until the abolition of in-vision continuity in January 2007. At night, a simple caption is broadcast. The channel shares space with Barnkanalen, which broadcasts during the day.

On 1 September 2007, the channel got new broadcasting hours. Barnkanalen took over the 6-7 slot, while Kunskapskanalen extended its broadcasting time to 1 a.m.

In the autumn of 2008, Barnkanalen took over another hour of broadcast time. From 8 August 2008, Barnkanalen broadcast until 7:30 on weekdays. From 25 August 2008, Kunskapskanalen would commence its broadcasts at 8 p.m. every day. SVT also cuts down on the amount of original programming they produce for Kunskapskanalen, letting the channel rerun programs from SVT2 instead.

Starting on 18 January 2010, Kunskapskanalen's broadcast hours dramatically increased when it took over SVT24's channel space. It will then broadcast from 9 a.m. on weekdays and noon on weekends. During the daytime, it will broadcast SVT Forum (previously known as 24 Direkt), which broadcasts seminars, debates, and coverage of the Riksdag and the European Parliament.

The channel's first logo was inspired by Oscar Reutersvärd's impossible figures. This was replaced in 2012 by a new one, retaining the letter K, but positioning it as an abstract shape. According to the brand book for the rebrand, the goal was to position itself as the leader in the knowledge sector. The K figure would extend for program menus and promos, revealing an elongated shape sharing the figure's cut at the right.

The channel celebrated its twentieth anniversary on 27 September 2024. The plan was to try integrating its content on streaming media, as both parties have substantial amounts of programming on their respective services (SVT Play and UR Play).

== Logos and identities ==
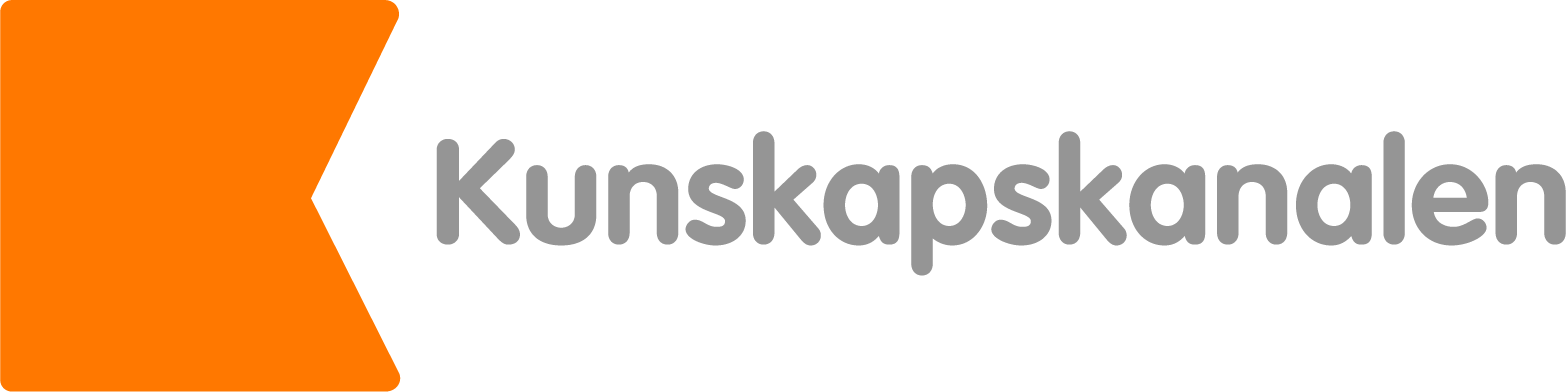
Kunskapskanalen's second and previous logo used from 5 March 2012 to 20 December 2017.

Kunskapskanalen's third and current logo since 2017, apart from 2024

Kunskapskanalen's special logo used during 2024 to mark its 20th anniversary.

== See also ==
- List of documentary television channels
