= SVT1 =

Swedish public TV channel

- Logo used since 2016
- Country: Sweden
- Broadcast area: Sweden, Åland, and Ostrobothnia, reaching bordering regions via overspill of their terrestrial networks

Programming
- Language: Swedish (Note: Swedish is the main language, but foreign language programmes are broadcast in its original language with Swedish subtitles; and subtitles in Danish are available for select Swedish original productions.)
- Picture format: HDTV (1080i 16:9)

Ownership
- Owner: Sveriges Television
- Sister channels: SVT2, SVT Barn, Kunskapskanalen, SVT24

History
- Launched: 4 September 1956; 70 years ago
- Former names: Radiotjänst TV (1956–1957); Sveriges TV (1957–1969); TV1 (1969–1987); Kanal 1 (1987–1996)

Links
- Website: http://www.svt.se/

Availability

Terrestrial
- DTT (Sweden): Channel 1 (HD)
- RiksTV (Norway): Channel 44
- SveaTV (only in Ostrobothnia, Finland): Channel 70
- Boxer (Denmark): Channel 35
- Televarpið (Faroe Islands): Channel 6

Streaming media
- SVT Play: Watch live (only in Sweden)

SVT1 (SVT Ett; commonly referred to as Ettan) is the primary television station of the Swedish public service broadcaster Sveriges Television in Sweden.

== History ==
Television in Sweden officially launched on 4 September 1956 with the launch of Radiotjänst TV, renamed Sveriges Radio TV a year later. It would take a few years before achieving national coverage. From 1955 to 1958, Danish television carried a program in Swedish (Sydsvenska journalen) aiming at viewers in Skåne until the link with Stockholm was finished in 1958.

The airing of feature films on SR's television channel were limited to 75 a year, of which 20 were Swedish in origin. This agreement ended in 1969.

The arrival of a second television network, TV2, led to the first channel relaunching as TV1 in 1969, remaining under the Sveriges Radio banner. In connection with the new system, the channel appointed Håkan Unsgaard as its director, and Aktuellt was replaced by TV-nytt, broadcasting on both channels (Aktuellt returned to TV1 in 1972). The old "TV0" was shut down on 29 November 1969 and the new TV1 started the following day. Among the programs shown on the launch night of the renamed service was a special variety show (Cabaret Canalhumorn) with Povel Ramel and Hans Alfredson. Full-time colour broadcasting started in 1970 before both networks were placed under the management of Sveriges Television (SVT) on 1 July 1979.

To encourage competition between the two channels, TV1 relaunched as Kanal 1 on 31 August 1987 with the entirety of its homegrown programming produced in Stockholm, including the national news and current affairs programme Aktuellt (Current). Organizationally, these changes were launched on 1 July, less than two months before the rebrand was made official.

The merger of the teams behind the two channels created a larger team for Kanal 1. Such merger allowed rationings that, over time, led to an increase in programming time. Kanal 1 got its drama unit, Kanal 1 Drama, which became the largest drama producer in the Nordic region. Increased competition from commercial channels, including TV4, led to another relaunch as SVT1 in 1996, incorporating programming produced from across the country again.

A major corporate revamp in 2001 saw the channel repositioned as SVT's flagship network to make it the most-watched television station in Sweden - a position previously held by SVT2. As part of the revamp, TV2's popular news programme Rapport (Report) moved to the first network while Aktuellt moved to the second network.

Alongside Rapport, SVT's main entertainment shows air on the first channel, including Melodifestivalen, Så ska det låta and På spåret are broadcast on this channel.

In October 2006, some programs on SVT1 began to be broadcast in HDTV format via the channel SVT HD. In June 2008, SVT HD started broadcasting upscaled programs from SVT1 when there were no HD programs available.

On 25 August 2008, a further change was made. The biggest change, which received a lot of criticism, was that Bolibompa's 18:00 (6:00 pm) broadcast, after more than twenty years on SVT1, as well as more programs from the children's range, were moved to Barnkanalen. At the same time, regional news moved to SVT1, which made it possible to move SVT2's pre-evening block with news, regional news and Go'kväll to SVT1.

On 7 September 2009, SVT1 became a 24-hour broadcasting channel when the nightly simulcast with SVT24 was replaced by essentially repeats.

On 17 June 2010, SVT received permission from the government to start broadcasting two HDTV channels in the digital terrestrial network. On 20 September 2010, SVT HD was discontinued and replaced by a full-time simulcast of SVT1 in HDTV format. On 1 November, HD broadcasts began in the terrestrial network in several locations.

== Logos and identities ==
SVT1's third logo, designed by Sid Sutton, used from 1980 to 7 January 1996.

SVT1's third logo used from March 1997 to 2001.

SVT1's seventh and previous logo, used from 25 August 2008 to 24 November 2016.

SVT1's seventh and previous logo on a purple rectangle used until 4 March 2012.

HD logo, used from 2010 to 2012.

HD logo, used from 2012 to 2016.

SVT1's eighth and current logo since 25 November 2016.

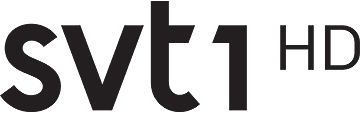
HD logo since 2016.

=== 1956 to 1969 ===
Initially known as Radiotjänst TV, the channel was renamed as Sveriges Radio TV after its parent company. It was usually referred to as TV for short, as it was the only television service available at the time.

During the 1960s, the television service usually used the Sveriges Radio logo as identification. It was designed by Karl-Erik Forsberg and is still in use by Sveriges Radio. At start up and closedown, the service used an ident slide consisting of an art deco version of central Stockholm, with the Stockholm City Hall in the centre.

=== 1969 to 1980 ===
When a second channel launched in December 1969, 'Sveriges Radio TV' was renamed TV1. As colour television arrived a year later, TV1 started using a blue background behind their logo.

=== 1980 to January 1996 ===
TV1 and TV2 became part of Sveriges Television in 1980. The new company received a new logo a year later, designed by Sid Sutton, with similarly designed logos for both networks.

On screen, the TV1 and TV2 logos were usually seen accompanying picturesque slides of the country and the station clock, although in-vision continuity was generally favoured for most junctions.

The Kanal 1 revamp in 1987 saw the introduction of a computer-animated ident featuring Stockholm landmarks surrounding the logo. In-vision continuity was abandoned in favour of out-of-vision presentation over captions, although in-vision returned during the Christmas holidays, usually for the annual Christmas Eve continuity shift, handled by veteran broadcaster Arne Weise.

Full-time in-vision continuity returned as part of a further revamp in 1994, two years before both networks launched a new look.

=== October 1996 to 2001 ===
The initial graphics for SVT1 and SVT2 were replaced a year later with a predominantly blue theme.

=== 2001 to 2008 ===
In 2001, a corporate rebranding by Timothy Wilkinson and Darrell Pockett from English & Pockett led to a further revamp, featuring SVT's new starflower logo. A warmer orange and red theme was adapted for the first network and updated two years later. The SVT logo consisted of an orange square with the numeral "1" in the Myriad font next to the starflower.

A new package was unveiled on 22 September 2003, marked by a warm color scheme.

All SVT presentation switched to widescreen in 2007.

=== 2008 to 2016 ===
SVT1 underwent another relaunch on 25 August 2008, designed by Stockholm-based Liberty. While the new look did not feature the corporate logo, SVT1's idents featured a violet rectangle theme centred around a TV screen - the new graphics were designed by Dallas Sthlm.

A review of SVT presentation led to the end of in-vision continuity on the network on Sunday 4 March 2012 - the last announcer to appear on camera was Justine Kirk. SVT1 now utilises out-of-vision announcers.

== Programming ==
On weekdays, a typical broadcast day on SVT1 begins with the breakfast programme Morgonstudion (lit., "The Morning Studio") followed by a mix of repeats of the previous night's primetime lineup, films, TV series, magazine shows, and documentaries throughout the day as well as live sport. The main evening schedule usually airs from around 17:00 (5:00 pm) until midnight with the main 25-minute edition of Rapport at 19:30 (7:30 pm), alongside shorter bulletins at 18:00 (6:00 pm) and later in the evening. Repeat programming airs throughout the night.

SVT1 is usually the channel for annual events of national significance such as the announcement and awarding of the various Nobel Prizes and the Eurovision Song Contest.

=== Regional programming ===
Since August 2008, SVT1 also broadcast regional news programming, including opt-outs in Morgonstudion, a main 15-minute bulletin at 18:30 (6:30 pm) and a mid-evening update at 19:55 (7:55 pm). Stories from SVT's regional newsrooms also feature in the national programme Sverige idag (Sweden Today) on weekdays. As of April 2015, there are 21 regional news services, under the SVT Nyheter banner, although most are pre-recorded from centralised studios.

== See also ==
- SVT2
- List of Swedish television channels
