= Kanal 9 =

Swedish television station

- Country: Sweden
- Broadcast area: Sweden

Ownership
- Owner: Warner Bros. Discovery EMEA (Skydance Corporation)
- Sister channels: Kanal 5 Kanal 11; Discovery Channel (Swedish); TLC (Swedish)

History
- Launched: 25 February 2007; 19 years ago
- Replaced: ONE Television

Links
- Website: Official website

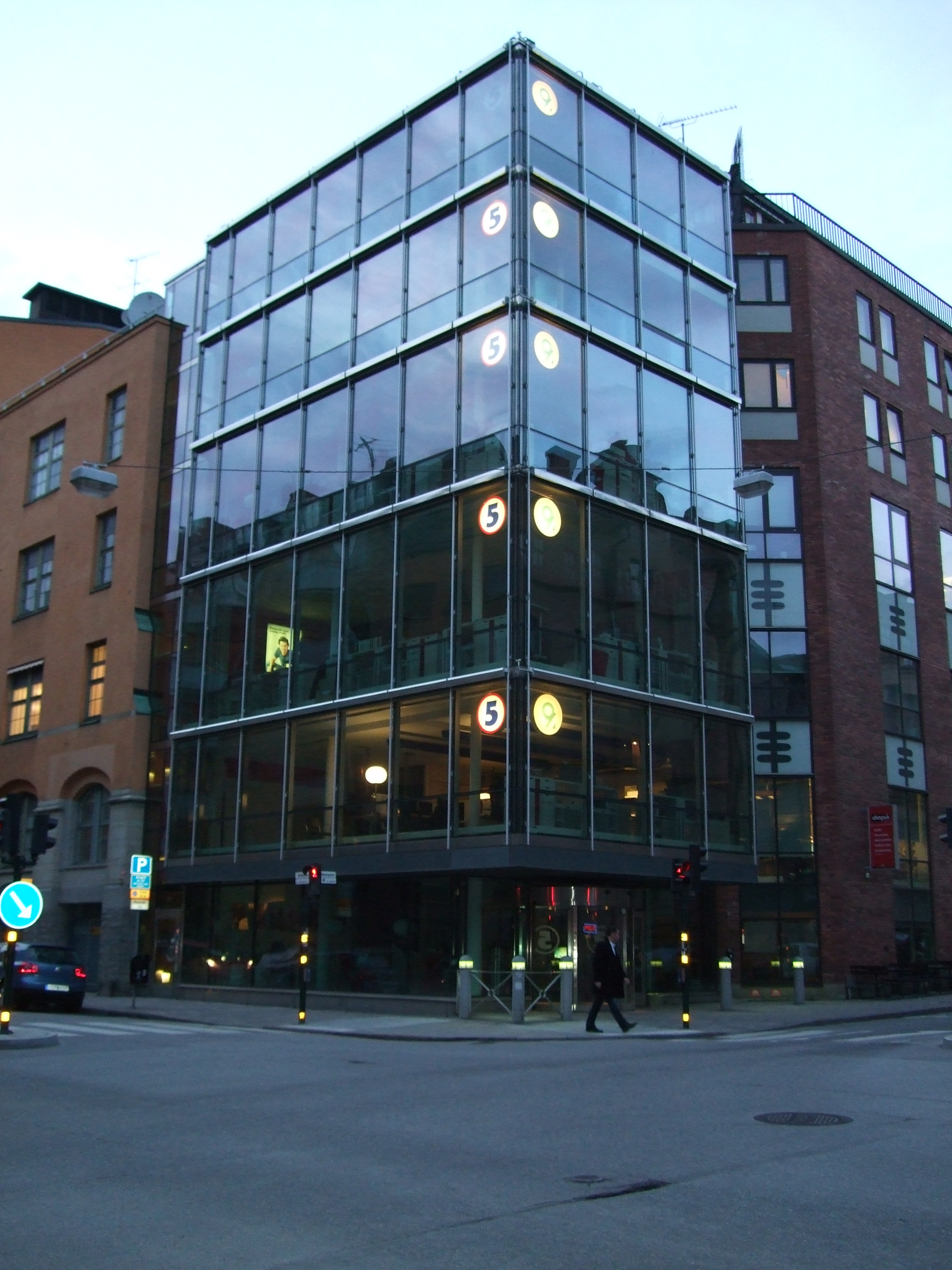
Stockholm headquarters for Kanal 9 and Kanal 5 on Rådmansgatan.

Kanal 9 (Channel 9) is a Swedish subscription television channel owned by Skydance Corporation. It targets the 25-59 age group, which is a slightly older age group than the sister channel Kanal 5. The channel launched on 25 February 2007. Its opening night featured the 79th Academy Awards. The programming consists of drama series, movies, sports and documentaries.

== History ==
Kanal 9 uses the space formerly occupied by ONE Television in the terrestrial network. This caused some controversy. A clause in the broadcasting license states that "news from the European Union and programmes from different European countries" should be included in the broadcasts. ONE used to broadcast several French and German programmes, as well as the news programme European Journal to comply with this clause. As SBS have stated that Kanal 9 will not broadcast any news at all, they could possibly violate the license.

The channel opened at 4.45pm (CET) with a Royal League match between F.C. Copenhagen and Hammarby IF. This was followed by an Oscars nights containing the movie The Pianist up to the Academy Awards at 2am. The first week's schedule also included European Journal and some non-British European content to comply with the broadcasting license, but it was broadcast outside primetime.

In the first weeks the channel had ratings over 100,000 viewers several times thanks to the broadcasts of ice hockey games. The highest rating in March 2007 was 215,000 for two ice hockey games. On 2 June 2007 Kanal 9 broadcast a UEFA Euro 2008 qualifying game between Denmark and Sweden. The second half, that contained the fan attack, had a rating of 865,000, then the highest ever for a channel not belonging to the big five.

Kanal 9 participates in Olympic coverage along with Kanal 5 as part of parent company Discovery's free to air sub-licensing rights.

== Logos ==
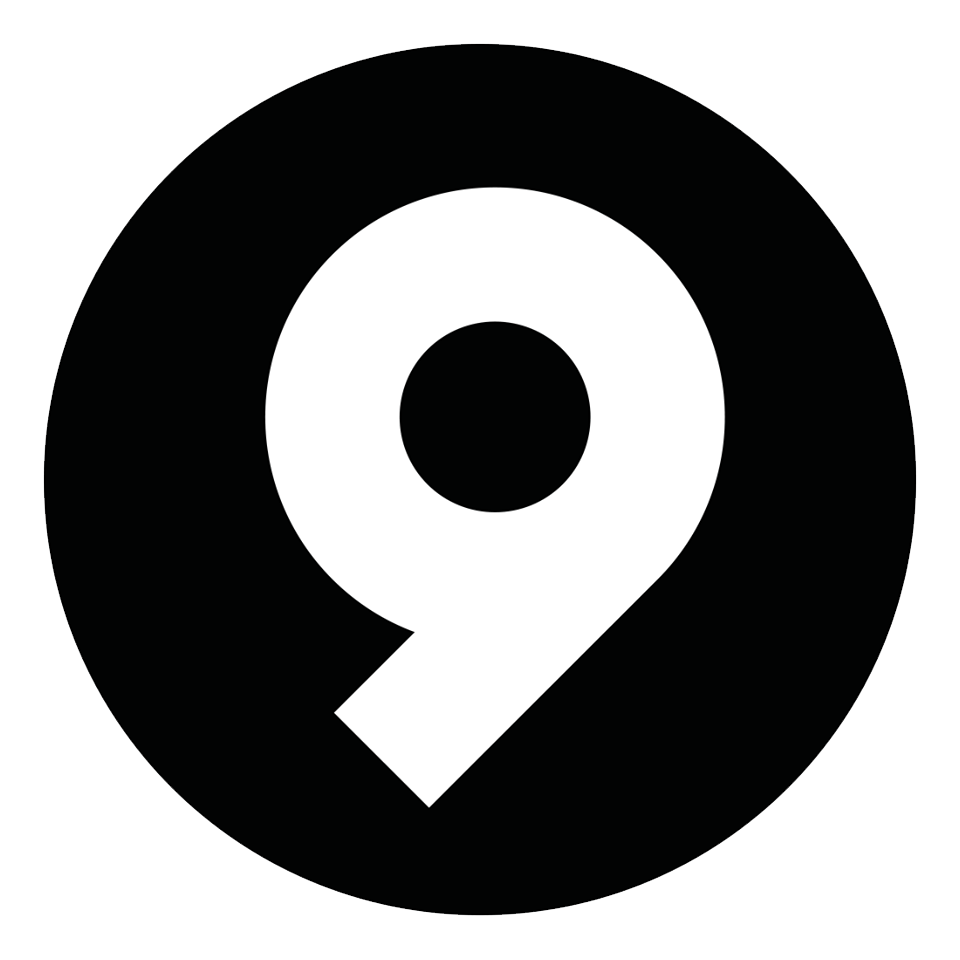
Kanal 9 second logo from 2014 to 2024

== See also ==
- Kanal 5
