= 2005 in Swedish television =

List of years in Swedish television
- … 1995; 1996; 1997; 1998; 1999; 2000; 2001; 2002; 2003; 2004; 2005; 2006; 2007; 2008; 2009; 2010; 2011; 2012; 2013; 2014; 2015 …
- Art; Archaeology; Architecture; Literature; Music; Philosophy; Science; +...

This is a list of Swedish television related events from 2005.

== Events ==
- 30 January - Kanal5 joined forces with TVN from Norway to co-produce the Scandinavian version of Big Brother.
- 24 April - Sandra Oxenryd wins the fourth and final season of Fame Factory, becoming the show's first and only woman to have won.
- 22 May - The first season of the Scandinavian version of Big Brother is won by Britt Goodwin from Norway.
- 2 December - Agnes Carlsson wins the second season of Idol.

== Debuts ==
- 30 January - The Scandinavian version of Big Brother (2005-2006, 2014–present)

== Television shows ==
- 1–24 December - En Decemberdröm

=== 2000s ===
- Idol (2004-2011, 2013–present)

== Ending this year ==
- Fame Factory (2002-2005)

== Networks and services ==
=== Launches ===
Network	Type	Launch date	Notes	Source
Kanal Lokal	Cable television	Unknown		
C More Film 2	Cable television	Unknown		
Kanal 11	Cable television	14 January		
TV4 Sport	Cable television	17 March		
Viasat Sport 24	Cable television	24 April		
C More First HD	Cable television	1 September		
TV4 Fakta	Cable television	15 September		
MTV	Cable television	18 September		
ONE Television	Cable television	31 October		
DiTV	Cable television	7 November		

=== Conversions and rebrandings ===
Old network name	New network name	Type	Conversion Date	Notes	Source
Canal+ Film 1	Canal+ Film	Cable television	Unknown		

=== Closures ===
Network	Type	End date	Notes	Sources
[[]]	Cable and satellite			

== See also ==
- 2005 in Sweden
