= 2006 in Swedish television =

List of years in Swedish television
- … 1996; 1997; 1998; 1999; 2000; 2001; 2002; 2003; 2004; 2005; 2006; 2007; 2008; 2009; 2010; 2011; 2012; 2013; 2014; 2015; 2016 …
- Art; Archaeology; Architecture; Literature; Music; Philosophy; Science; +...

This is a list of Swedish television related events from 2006.

== Events ==
- 10 March - Singer and finalist from the second season of Idol Måns Zelmerlöw and his partner Maria Karlsson win the first season of Let's Dance.
- 22 May - Jessica Lindgren wins the second season of the Scandinavian version of Big Brother for Sweden.
- 1 December - Markus Fagervall wins the third season of Idol.

== Debuts ==
- 6 January - Let's Dance (2006–present)

== Television shows ==
=== 2000s ===
- Idol (2004-2011, 2013–present)
- 1-24 December - LasseMajas detektivbyrå

== Ending this year ==
- The Scandinavian version of Big Brother (2005-2006, 2014–present)

== Networks and services ==
=== Launches ===
Network	Type	Launch date	Notes	Source
Playhouse Disney	Cable television	Unknown		
Suryoyo Sat	Cable television	January		
Fight+	Cable television	1 March		
TV6	Cable television	9 May		
Silver	Cable television	26 May		
Axess TV	Cable television	27 May		
Aftonbladet TV7	Cable television	9 October		
SVT HD	Cable television	20 October		
Canal+ Drama	Cable television	1 November		
TV4 Guld	Cable television	3 November		
TV4 Komedi	Cable television	3 November		

=== Conversions and rebrandings ===
Old network name	New network name	Type	Conversion Date	Notes	Source
Barnkanalen	SVT Barkanalen	Cable television	Unknown		
Canal+ Film	Canal+ Film 1	Cable television	Unknown		

=== Closures ===
Network	Type	End date	Notes	Sources
C More Film	Cable television	Unknown		
Fight+	Cable television	11 December		

== See also ==
- 2006 in Sweden
- List of Swedish television ratings for 2006
