= 2011 in Swedish television =

| List of years in Swedish television |
- … 2001; 2002; 2003; 2004; 2005; 2006; 2007; 2008; 2009; 2010; 2011; 2012; 2013; 2014; 2015; 2016; 2017; 2018; 2019; 2020; 2021 …
- Art; Archaeology; Architecture; Literature; Music; Philosophy; Science; +...

This is a list of Swedish television related events from 2011.

== Events ==
- 25 March - The Fame singer Jessica Andersson and her partner Kristjan Lootus win the sixth season of Let's Dance.
- 5 June – Simon Danielsson wins the fifth season of Big Brother.
- 10 June – 17-year-old Rubik's Cube solver Simon Westlund wins the fifth season of Talang.
- 9 December – Amanda Fondell wins the sixth season of Idol.

== Debuts ==
- 20 February – Big Brother Sverige (2000–2004, 2011–2012)

== Television shows ==
=== 2000s ===
- Let's Dance (2006–present)

=== 2010s ===
- 1–24 December – Tjuvarnas jul

== Ending this year ==
- Idol (2004–2011, 2013–present)
- Talang (2007–2011, 2014–present)

== Networks and services ==
=== Launches ===
| Network | Type | Launch date | Notes | Source |
|---|---|---|---|---|
| C More Emotion | Cable television | 1 June | | |
| Canal+ Family | Cable television | Unknown | | |

=== Conversions and rebrandings ===
| Old network name | New network name | Type | Conversion Date | Notes | Source |
|---|---|---|---|---|---|
| TV4 Plus | Sjuan | Cable television | | | |
| TV7 | TNT7 | Cable television | | | |

=== Closures ===
| Network | Type | End date | Notes | Sources |
|---|---|---|---|---|
| Canal+ Drama | Cable television | 1 July | | |

== See also ==
- 2011 in Sweden
