= 2006 in Danish television =

This is a list of Danish television related events from 2006.

== Events ==
- 17 November - Olympic gold medal handball player Christina Roslyng and her partner Steen Lund win the third season of Vild med dans.

== Television shows ==
=== 1990s ===
- Hvem vil være millionær? (1999–present)

=== 2000s ===
- Klovn (2005-2009)
- Vild med dans (2005–present)

== Ending this year ==
- The Eagle (2004-2006)

== Channels ==
Launches:

- Unknown: Playhouse Disney
- Unknown: Voom HD International
- 1 March: Fight+
- 1 May: Kanal 4
- 26 May: Silver
- 1 November: Canal+ Drama
- 1 December: TV 2 News

Conversions and rebrandings:

- Unknown: Canal+ Film to Canal+ Film 1

Closures:

- Unknown: C More Film
- 11 December: Fight+

== See also ==
- 2006 in Denmark
