= 2015 in Swedish television =

This is a list of Swedish television related events from 2015.

== Events ==
- 24 April - Olympic gold medal alpine skier Ingemar Stenmark and his partner Cecilia Ehrling win the tenth season of Let's Dance.
- 23 May - Sweden wins the 60th Eurovision Song Contest in Vienna, Austria. The winning song is "Heroes", performed by Måns Zelmerlöw.
- 29 May - Footballer Anton Hysén and his partner Sigrid Bernson, who won the seventh season of Let's Dance beat actor Morgan Alling and his partner Helena Fransson who finished third in the fourth season to win Let's Dance 10 år.
- 4 December - Martin Almgren wins the eleventh season of Idol.
- 20 December - Christian Sahlström wins the seventh season of Big Brother.

=== SVT ===
Date	Debut	Channel
16 February	Jordskott	SVT1
11 September	Familjen Rysberg	SVT Barnkanalen
28 September	Ängelby	SVT1
6 December	Min bror Kollokungen	SVT Barnkanalen

=== TV4 ===
Date	Debut	Channel
13 March	Ack Värmland	TV4
23 September	Modus	TV4

== Television shows ==
=== 2000s ===
- Idol (2004-2011, 2013–present)
- The Scandinavian version of Big Brother (2005-2006, 2014–present)
- Let's Dance (2006–present)
- Talang Sverige (2007-2011, 2014–present)

== Networks and services ==
=== Launches ===
Network	Type	Launch date	Notes	Source
Investigation Discovery	Cable television	1 June		

=== Closures ===
Network	Type	End date	Notes	Sources
Showtime Scandinavia	Cable television	15 July		
Silver	Cable television	15 July		
Star! Scandinavia	Cable television	15 July		

== See also ==
- 2015 in Sweden
