= 1966 in Swedish television =

This is a list of Swedish television related events from 1966.

== Events ==
- 29 January - Lill Lindfors and Svante Thuresson are selected to represent Sweden at the 1966 Eurovision Song Contest with their song "Nygammal vals". They are selected to be the eighth Swedish Eurovision entry during Melodifestivalen 1966 held in Stockholm.

== Television shows ==
=== 1960s ===
- Hylands hörna (1962-1983)

== See also ==
- 1966 in Sweden
