= 1962 in Swedish television =

This is a list of Swedish television related events from 1962.

== Events ==
- 13 February - Inger Berggren is selected to represent Sweden at the 1962 Eurovision Song Contest with her song "Sol och vår". She is selected to be the fifth Swedish Eurovision entry during Melodifestivalen 1962 held in Stockholm.

== Debuts ==
- 3 October - Hylands hörna (1962–1983)

== See also ==
- 1962 in Sweden
