= 1968 in Swedish television =

This is a list of Swedish television related events from 1968.

== Events ==
- 9 March - Claes-Göran Hederström is selected to represent Sweden at the 1968 Eurovision Song Contest with his song "Det börjar verka kärlek, banne mej". He is selected to be the tenth Swedish Eurovision entry during Melodifestivalen 1968 held in Stockholm.

== Television shows ==
=== 1960s ===
- Hylands hörna (1962-1983)

== See also ==
- 1968 in Sweden
