= 2004 in Sweden =

- Decades: 1980s; 1990s; 2000s; 2010s; 2020s
- See also: Other events of 2004; Timeline of Swedish history

The following events occurred in Sweden in the year 2004.

== Incumbents ==
- Monarch – Carl XVI Gustaf
- Prime Minister – Göran Persson

== Events ==
- 13 June – Sweden held elections to the 2004 European Parliament.
- 13–24 April – Örnsköldsvik hosted the 2004 IPC Ice Sledge Hockey World Championships (now called The World Para Ice Hockey Championships), the third edition of the tournament, with eight national teams including Sweden, Norway, Canada, and the USA.
- 11–19 September – The 21st World Orienteering Championships were hosted in Västerås, Sweden, with eight events—including sprint, middle and long distance races, and relays for both men and women.
- 26 December – The Indian Ocean tsunami struck the surrounding region and killed approximately 530 Swedish nationals and prompting a major national response effort.

== Deaths ==
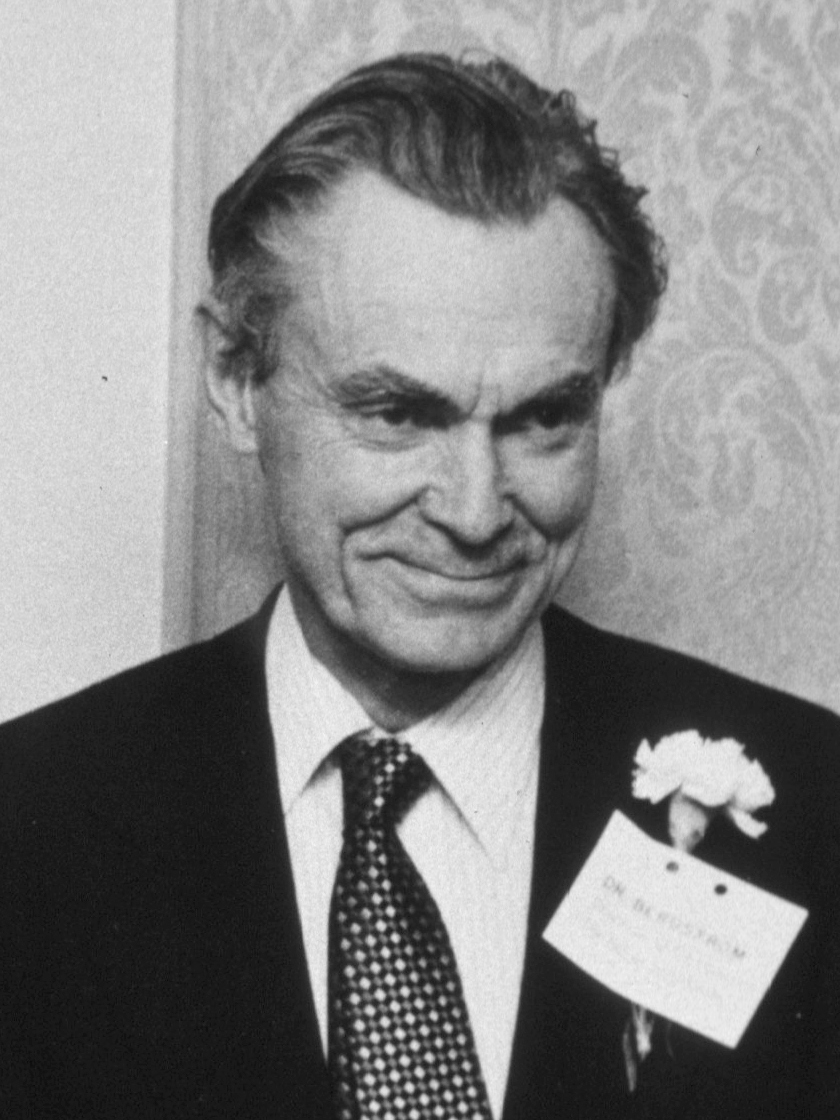
Sune Bergström recipient of the Nobel Prize in Physiology or Medicine.

- 9 January – Börje Dorch, journalist (born 1929)
- 15 August – Sune Bergström, biochemist (born 1916)
- 9 November – Stieg Larsson, journalist and novelist (born 1954)
- 17 November – Mikael Ljungberg, wrestler (born 1970)

== See also ==
- 2004 in Swedish television
