= 2006 in Sweden =

- Decades: 1980s; 1990s; 2000s; 2010s; 2020s
- See also: Other events of 2006; Timeline of Swedish history

Events from the year 2006 in Sweden

== Incumbents ==
- Monarch – Carl XVI Gustaf
- Prime Minister – Göran Persson, Fredrik Reinfeldt

== Events ==
- Love and War, an animated short film is released.
- Swegon Air Academy is founded.

== Publications ==
- The Girl Who Played with Fire, novel by Stieg Larsson.
- 26 October – The Swedish Metapedia was founded by Anders Lagerström.

== Births ==
- 3 January – Tara Babulfath, judoka

== Deaths ==
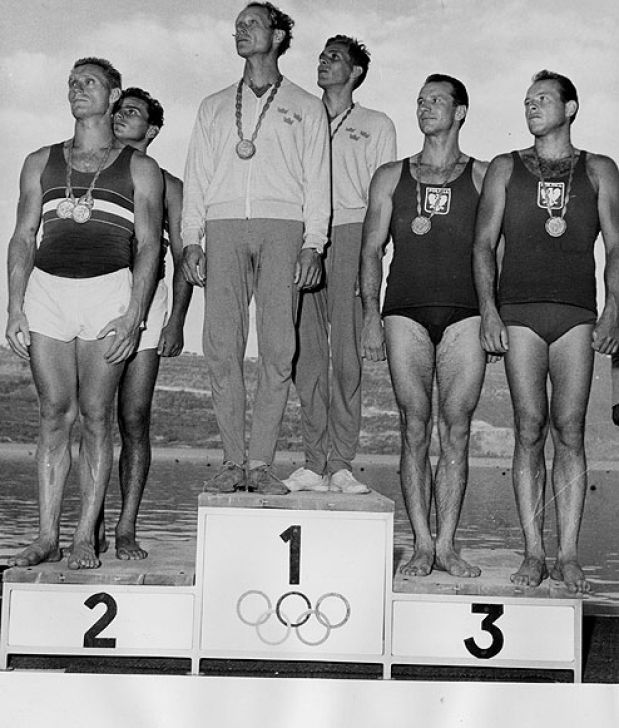
Gert Fredriksson won gold medal in K-2 1000m together with Sven-Olof Sjödelius at the 1960 Summer Olympics.

- 20 January
  - Sven Fagerberg, writer (born 1918)
  - Dave Lepard, singer-songwriter and guitarist (b. 1980)
- 5 July – Gert Fredriksson, canoer, Olympic champion (born 1919).
- 27 July – Göran Printz-Påhlson, writer (born 1931)
- 17 September – Hans Berglund, canoer (born 1918).
- 3 October – Göta Rosén, politician and child welfare inspector (born 1904).
- 4 October – Gunnar Åkerlund, canoer (born 1923).

== See also ==
- 2006 in Swedish television
