= 1969 in Swedish television =

This is a list of Swedish television related events from 1969.

== Events ==
- 1 March - Tommy Körberg is selected to represent Sweden at the 1969 Eurovision Song Contest with his song "Judy, min vän". He is selected to be the eleventh Swedish Eurovision entry during Melodifestivalen 1969 held in Stockholm.

== Television shows ==
=== 1960s ===
- Hylands hörna (1962–1983)

== Networks and services ==
=== Launches ===
Network	Type	Launch date	Notes	Source
SVT2	Cable television	5 December		

== See also ==
- 1969 in Sweden
