= 1963 in Swedish television =

This is a list of Swedish television related events from 1963.

== Events ==
- 16 February - Monica Zetterlund is selected to represent Sweden at the 1963 Eurovision Song Contest with her song "En gång i Stockholm". She is selected to be the sixth Swedish Eurovision entry during Melodifestivalen 1963 held in Stockholm.

== Television shows ==
=== 1960s ===
- Hylands hörna (1962-1983)

== See also ==
- 1963 in Sweden
