= Big Brother (Norwegian and Swedish TV series) season 3 =

Big Brother
- Season 3
- Presented by: Adam Alsing; Pia Lykke
- No. of days: 103
- No. of housemates: 24
- Winner: Anders Olsson
- Runner-up: Anna Andersson

Release
- Original network: FEM (Norway); Kanal 9 (Sweden)
- Original release: 31 August – 11 December 2014

Series chronology
- ← Previous; Norway and Sweden 2 Next → Sweden 7

Big Brother 2014 is the ninth Swedish series and the seventh Norwegian series, and the third joined season between the two countries of the reality series Big Brother. It began on 31 August 2014 on the Swedish channel Kanal 9 and the Norwegian channel FEM, with the season being hosted by Adam Alsing and Pia Lykke. The Big Brother house is located in Spånga, Sweden.

== Housemates ==
=== The Box ===
Roughly a day before the season's start, four hopeful contestants went inside The Box, situated in the House's backyard. There, two of them would become real housemates on Big Brother 2014 after the season premiere. The four contestants were (with the two in bold who became real housemates):

- **Anna Andersson, 23, Haninge, Sweden**
- **Erland Slettmoen, 27, Jessheim, Norway**
- Sondre Hjertas, 20, Sarpsborg, Norway
- Krisse-Ly "Krissy" Kuldkepp, 21, Gothenburg, Sweden

During Week 2 though, Sondre got chosen by the women to enter the House and became a housemate on Day 8. And on Day 11, Krissy got chosen as well into the House.

=== Ladies Week ===
During the second week, the women were in control choosing new housemates to enter the House. All the potential housemates appearing (with the ones in bold who became real housemates) are listed down here:

- **Christoffer Bedin, 25, Borås, Sweden**
- **Sondre Hjertas, 20, Sarpsborg, Norway**
- Henrik Brækhus, 29, Bergen, Norway
- **Anton Allansson, 24, Falköping, Sweden**
- Morten Hake, 27, Sandefjord, Norway
- **Krissy-Ly "Krissy" Kuldkepp, 21, Gothenburg, Sweden**
- Jenny Frånlund, 25, Stockholm, Sweden
- Ioana Valentina Pintea, 26, Oslo, Norway

Despite not being chosen, both Jenny Fr. and Ioana entered the House during Week 3. And at the live eviction night on Week 7, Henrik entered the House.

=== Housemates ===
On Day 1, fourteen housemates entered the house, and two more entered after midnight of Day 1. On Day 7, Thomas entered the House as a replacement for the ejected housemate Ståle. During week 2 between Day 8-12, five more housemates entered the House. On Day 16, Ioana entered the house. On Day 33 at the live eviction night, Malin entered. And on Day 47, Henrik and Johanna entered the house, making the total of housemates up to 24.

Name	Age on entry	Hometown
Anders Olsson	28	Karlstad, Sweden
Anna Andersson	23	Haninge, Sweden
Anton Allansson	24	Falköping, Sweden
Caroline Josefine Urdalen	24	Kristiansand, Norway
Christoffer Bedin	25	Borås, Sweden
Erland Slettmoen	27	Jessheim, Norway
Felicia Moberg	22	Karlstad, Sweden
Henrik Brækhus	29	Bergen, Norway
Ioana Valentina Pintea	26	Oslo, Norway
Jenny Fernandez-Bolstad	25	Sortland, Norway
Jenny Frånlund	25	Stockholm, Sweden
Johanna Zetterström	26	Stockholm, Sweden
John Dalin	23	Salem, Sweden
Julia Krischel	29	Karlstad, Sweden
Krissy-Ly "Krissy" Kuldkepp	21	Gothenburg, Sweden
Malin Irgens Hylland	21	Oslo, Norway
Mari-Lene Mestre	20	Haugesund, Norway
Paulina Engfors	23	Stockholm, Sweden
Per "Pelle" Sigbjørn Kravik	26	Oslo, Norway
Philip Hjertén	28	Borås, Sweden
Sondre Hjertas	20	Sarpsborg, Norway
Ståle Vollan	29	Lillehammer, Norway
Thomas Weyshaupt	40	Oslo, Norway
Thorbjørn Andersen	28	Skjeberg, Norway

== Nominations table ==
	Week 1	Week 2	Week 3	Week 4	Week 5	Week 6	Week 7	Week 8	Week 9	Week 10	Week 11	Week 12	Week 13	Week 14	Week 15	
Anders	—N/a	Not eligible	No nominations	N/A	Nominated	—N/a	Exempt	N/A	Nominated	—N/a	—N/a	—N/a	Johanna, Jenny Fe., Anna	Jenny Fe., Erland, Krissy	Winner (Day 103)	
Anna	N/A	N/A	No nominations	—N/a	—N/a	—N/a	No nominations	—N/a	Johanna, ~~Malin~~, Christoffer	—N/a	N/A	—N/a	Anders, Erland, Jenny Fe.	Jenny Fe., Erland, Krissy	Runner-Up (Day 103)	
Erland	N/A	Not eligible	No nominations	—N/a	—N/a	—N/a	No nominations	—N/a	Nominated	—N/a	—N/a	—N/a	Anna, Anders, Jenny Fe.	Anna, Jenny Fe., Pelle	Third place (Day 103)	
Pelle	—N/a	Not eligible	No nominations	N/A	Nominated	—N/a	Exempt	N/A	Nominated	—N/a	—N/a	N/A	Erland, Johanna, Jenny Fe.	Erland, Jenny Fe., Krissy	Fourth place (Day 103)	
Krissy	Not in House		No nominations	—N/a	Nominated	—N/a	Nominated	N/A	Nominated	—N/a	—N/a	—N/a	Anders, Anna, Erland	Pelle, Erland, Jenny Fe.	Evicted (Day 102)	
Jenny Fe.	—N/a	N/A	No nominations	N/A	N/A	—N/a	No nominations	—N/a	Johanna, Henrik, Anders	—N/a	—N/a	—N/a	Johanna, Anders, Anna	Pelle, Krissy, Erland	Evicted (Day 96)	
Johanna	Not in House							N/A	Nominated	—N/a	—N/a	N/A	Jenny Fe., Anders, Anna	Evicted (Day 89)		
Christoffer	Not in House	Not eligible	No nominations	—N/a	—N/a	—N/a	Nominated	N/A	Nominated	—N/a	N/A	N/A	Evicted (Day 82)			
Thorbjørn	—N/a	Not eligible	No nominations	—N/a	—N/a	—N/a	No nominations	—N/a	Johanna, Christoffer, ~~Malin~~	—N/a	—N/a	Evicted (Day 75)				
Malin	Not in House					—N/a	Exempt	N/A	Henrik, Johanna, Erland	—N/a	Evicted (Day 68)					
Henrik	Not in House							N/A	Nominated	Evicted (Day 61)						
Caroline	—N/a	N/A	No nominations	—N/a	—N/a	—N/a	No nominations	—N/a	Evicted (Day 54)							
John	—N/a	Not eligible	No nominations	—N/a	—N/a	—N/a	Ejected (Day 41)									
Philip	—N/a	Not eligible	No nominations	N/A	N/A	—N/a	Ejected (Day 41)									
Julia	—N/a	N/A	No nominations	—N/a	—N/a	—N/a	Evicted (Day 40)									
Jenny Fr.	Not in House		No nominations	N/A	—N/a	Evicted (Day 33)										
Mari-Lene	—N/a	N/A	No nominations	N/A	—N/a	Walked (Day 33)										
Thomas	Not in House	Not eligible	No nominations	—N/a	Walked (Day 30)											
Ioana	Not in House		No nominations	N/A	Walked (Day 28)											
Sondre	Not in House	Not eligible	No nominations	—N/a	Evicted (Day 26)											
Anton	Not in House	Not eligible	No nominations	Evicted (Day 19)												
Felicia	—N/a	N/A	Evicted (Day 12)													
Ståle	—N/a	Ejected (Day 6)														
Paulina	—N/a	Evicted (Day 5)														
Nomination note	1, 3	2, 4	1, 2, 5	1	1, 2, 6		7, 8	1, 2	1, 2, 9							
Against public vote	Anders, Felicia, Mari-Lene, Paulina	Anders, Anna, Caroline; Felicia, Jenny Fe., Julia, Mari-Lene, Pelle	Anton, John, Sondre, Thorbjørn	Sondre, Thomas	Anders, Jenny Fr., Krissy, ~~Mari-Lene~~, Pelle	Christoffer, Julia, Krissy, Thorbjørn	Anna, Caroline, Christoffer, Erland, Jenny Fe., Krissy, Thorbjørn	Caroline, Christoffer, Erland, Krissy, Thorbjørn	Anders, Christoffer, Erland, Henrik, Johanna, Krissy, Pelle	Johanna, Krissy, Malin, Thorbjørn	Christoffer, Erland, Jenny Fe., Johanna, Thorbjørn	Anders, Anna, Christoffer, Johanna	Anders, Anna, Jenny Fe., Johanna, Krissy	Erland, Jenny Fe., Krissy, Pelle	All housemates	
Walked	none				Ioana, Thomas, Mari-Lene	none										
Ejected	none	Ståle	none				John, Philip	none								
Evicted	Paulina; Fewest votes to save	Felicia; Most votes to evict	Anton; Most votes to evict	Sondre; Most votes to evict	Jenny Fr. Most votes to evict	Julia; Most votes to evict	Anna & Jenny Fe. Most votes to fake evict	Caroline; Most votes to evict	Henrik; Most votes to evict	Malin; Most votes to evict	Thorbjørn; Most votes to evict	Christoffer; Most votes to evict	Johanna; Most votes to evict	Jenny Fe. Most votes to evict	Krissy; Ex-housemates to evict	Pelle; Fewest votes to win
Evicted	Paulina; Fewest votes to save	Felicia; Most votes to evict	Anton; Most votes to evict	Sondre; Most votes to evict	Jenny Fr. Most votes to evict	Julia; Most votes to evict	Anna & Jenny Fe. Most votes to fake evict	Caroline; Most votes to evict	Henrik; Most votes to evict	Malin; Most votes to evict	Thorbjørn; Most votes to evict	Christoffer; Most votes to evict	Johanna; Most votes to evict	Jenny Fe. Most votes to evict	Erland; Fewest votes to win	Anna; Fewest votes to win
Evicted	Paulina; Fewest votes to save	Felicia; Most votes to evict	Anton; Most votes to evict	Sondre; Most votes to evict	Jenny Fr. Most votes to evict	Julia; Most votes to evict	Anna & Jenny Fe. Most votes to fake evict	Caroline; Most votes to evict	Henrik; Most votes to evict	Malin; Most votes to evict	Thorbjørn; Most votes to evict	Christoffer; Most votes to evict	Johanna; Most votes to evict	Jenny Fe. Most votes to evict	Anders; Most votes to win	

=== Notes ===
- ^Note 1: This housemate were given or won immunity for that week.
- ^Note 2: This housemate were automatically put up for eviction that week.
- ^Note 3: Anna and Erland were immune from the nominations this week because of winning the online poll in The Box, granting them official housemate status.
- ^Note 4: Since it was "Ladies Week", as their last privilege, the girls were the only one allowed to nominate and had to nominate guys. They nominated Anders and Pelle. But, because of the huge numbers of rules violation and pacts talk, all the girls are up for eviction too. It's a vote to evict rather than to save.
- ^Note 5: The nominations this week were cancelled and instead Anton, John, Sondre and Thorbjørn were put up for eviction because of a huge fight and rule breaking between the four of them.
- ^Note 6: Because Anders, Krissy and Pelle decided to opt out of this week's task, all three were put up for eviction as per the stipulations of that week's task.
- ^Note 7: Both John and Philip were ejected from the House on Day 41 after they made too intimate approaches towards one of the female housemates.
- ^Note 8: This week, viewers were voting for two people to be fake evicted (which became Anna and Jenny Fe.) into a "Dream Box" during Day 47-50.
- ^Note 9: Shortly after Caroline's eviction on the live show, the housemates had to nominate live for the next week's eviction night. They could choose though if they wanted to show the nominations or not. If they did not, they were automatically put up for eviction. But the two housemates who showed their nominations first got immunity.

== Sites ==
- BigBrotherBlogg - Big Brother 2015 Ambassador
