= 1996 in Swedish television =

This is a list of Swedish television related events from 1996.

== Events ==
- Unknown - Robert Randquist wins the third season of Sikta mot stjärnorna, performing as Julio Iglesias.

== Debuts ==
=== International ===
- 24 August - (United Kingdom) Doctor Who (1963-1989, 2005–present) (ZTV)
- 5 November - (United Kingdom) Happy Ness: Secret of the Loch (1995) (Filmnet)
- ??? - (United States) Caroline in the City (1995-1999) (?)

== Television shows ==
=== 1990s ===
- Sikta mot stjärnorna (1994-2002)

== Channels ==
Launches:

- 23 March: Sportkanalen

Closures:

- 30 December: Sportkanalen

== Deaths ==
Date	Name	Age	Cinematic Credibility
6 May	Pekka Langer	76	Swedish journalist & radio & TV host

== See also ==
- 1996 in Sweden
