= 1959 in Swedish television =

This is a list of Swedish television-related events from 1959.

== Events ==
- 29 January – Siw Malmkvist is selected to represent Sweden at the 1959 Eurovision Song Contest with her song "Augustin". She is selected to be the second Swedish Eurovision entry during Melodifestivalen held at Cirkus in Stockholm.
- 11 March – The Netherlands win the Eurovision Song Contest with the song "'n Beetje" by Teddy Scholten. Sweden finishes in ninth place with the song "Augustin" by Siw Malmkvist.

== See also ==
- 1959 in Sweden
