= 3rd World Farmer =

Browser-based serious game

- Screenshot of gameplay
- Designer: Frederik Hermund
- Programmers: Ole Toubro, Roman Spycher, Frederik Hermund, Jakob Elias Nielsen
- Artist: Benjamin Salqvist
- Engine: Adobe Flash Player
- Release: May 9, 2006
- Genres: Business; Serious game

3rd World Farmer is a browser-based serious game where the player seeks to improve their family's standard of living over several generations. It was originally prototyped as a student project at the IT University of Copenhagen, Denmark, in 2005. It was released on May 9, 2006.

== Reception ==
3rd World Farmer gained some recognition after release with coverage from mainstream media such as ABC News (USA), La Stampa (Italy), 4Gamer.net (Japan) and The Escapist (Australia).
