= 2003 in Sweden =

- Decades: 1980s; 1990s; 2000s; 2010s; 2020s
- See also: Other events of 2003; Timeline of Swedish history

Events from the year 2003 in Sweden

== Incumbents ==
- Monarch – Carl XVI Gustaf
- Prime Minister – Göran Persson

== Events ==
- 10 September – Foreign Minister Anna Lindh stabbed whilst shopping at a Stockholm department store.
- 11 September – Foreign Minister Anna Lindh dies of stab injuries.
- 14 September – 2003 Swedish euro referendum

== Popular culture ==
=== Film ===
- 16 September – Evil (Swedish: Ondskan), a drama film directed by Mikael Håfström, was released in Sweden. The film had earlier been presented at the Cannes film festival.

== Births ==
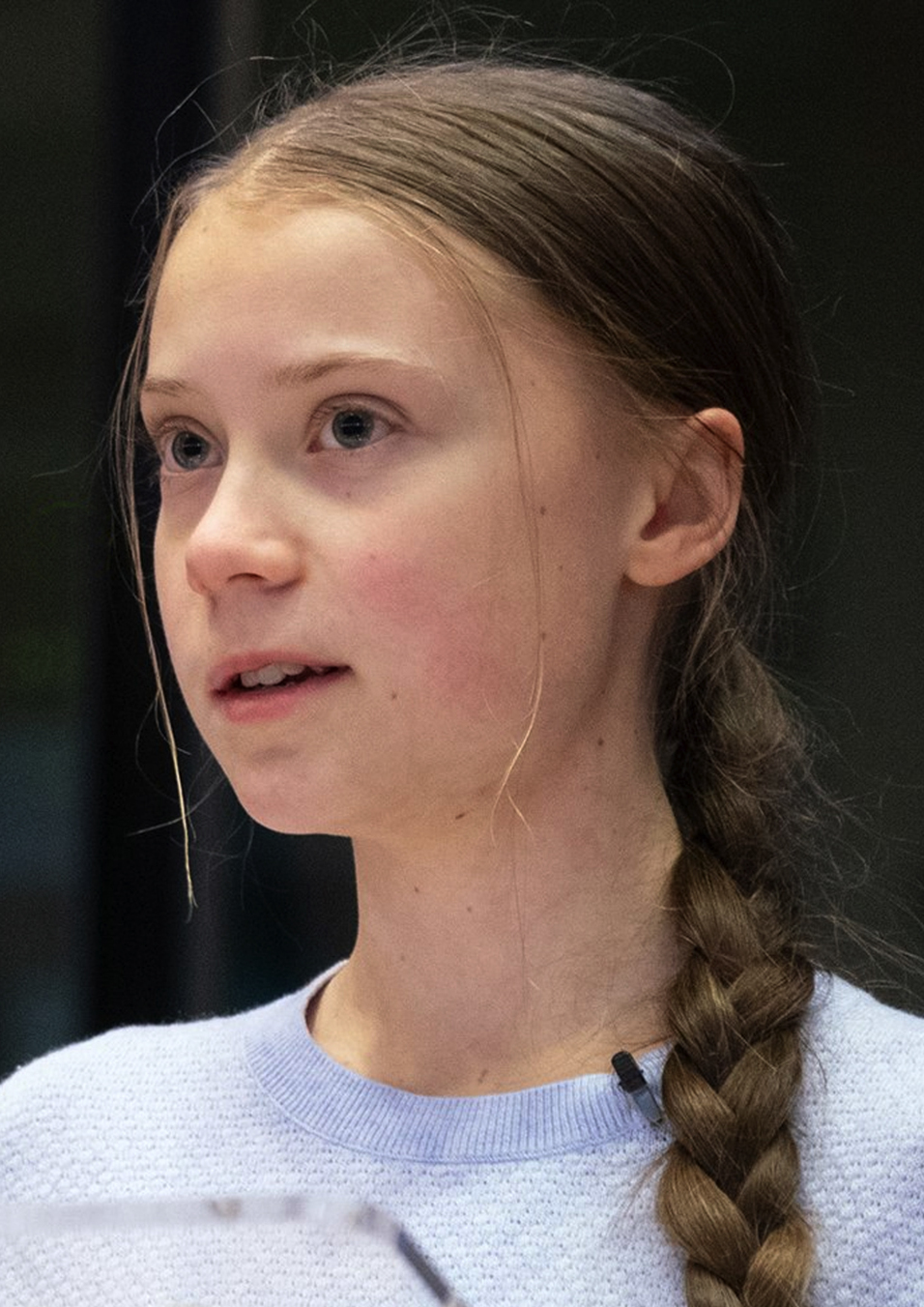
Greta Thunberg

- 3 January Greta Thunberg, climate activist.

== Deaths ==
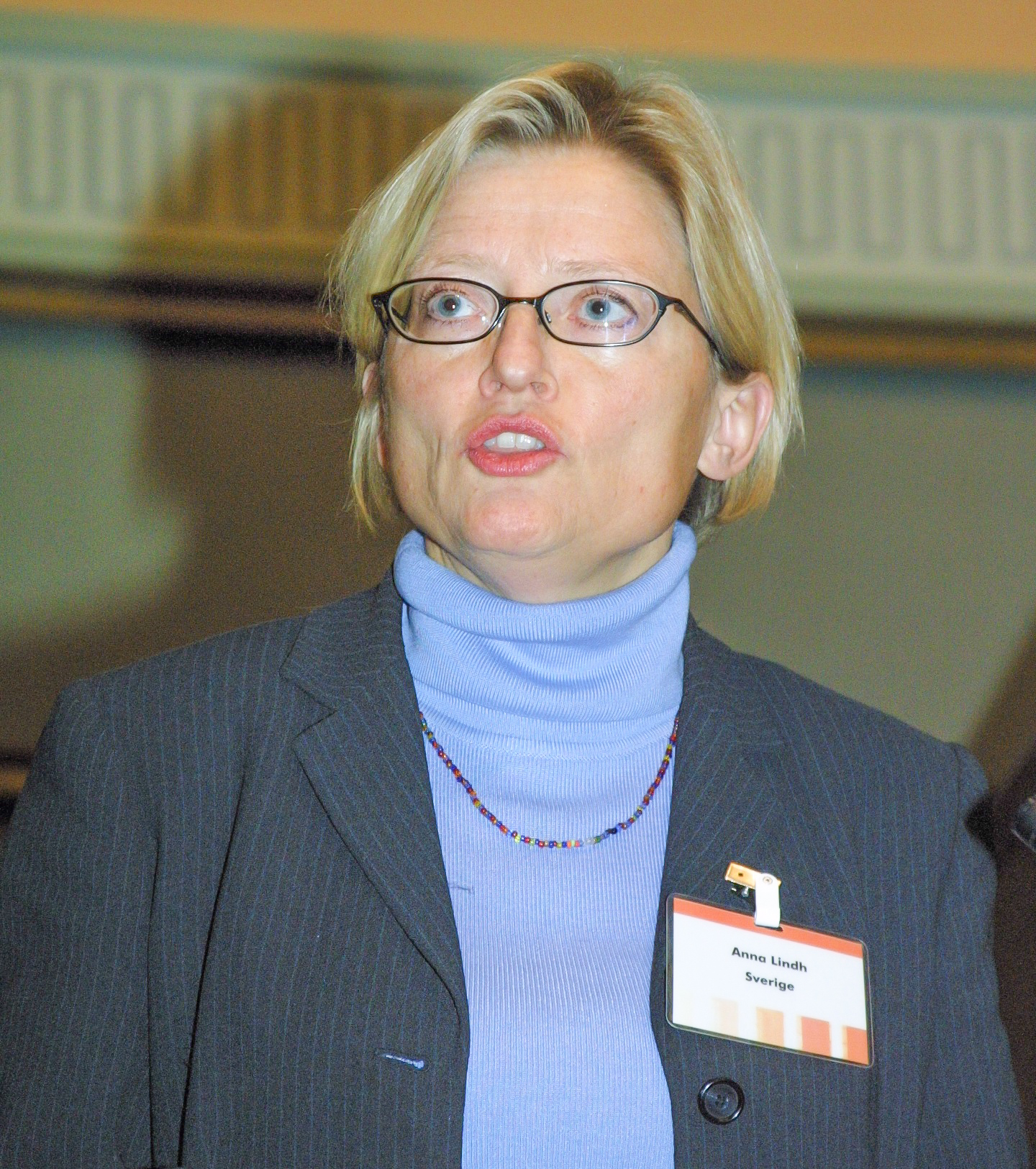
Anna Lindh

- 15 January – Arne Palmqvist, bishop (born 1921).
- 16 March – Lars Passgård, actor (born 1941).
- 25 August – Hjalmar Pettersson, cyclist (born 1906).
- 11 September – Anna Lindh, Foreign Minister (born 1957)
- 26 September – Olle Anderberg, sport wrestler, Olympic champion in 1952 (born 1919).
- 30 October – Börje Leander, footballer (born 1918).

== See also ==
- 2003 in Swedish television
