= 1961 in Swedish television =

This is a list of Swedish television related events from 1961.

== Events ==
- 6 February - Siw Malmkvist won Melodifestivalen 1961 held at Cirkus in Stockholm with the song "April, april", but is not selected to represent Sweden at the 1961 Eurovision Song Contest. She is replaced by Lill-Babs as the fourth Swedish Eurovision entry.

== See also ==
- 1961 in Sweden
