= Elita Löfblad =

Swedish model

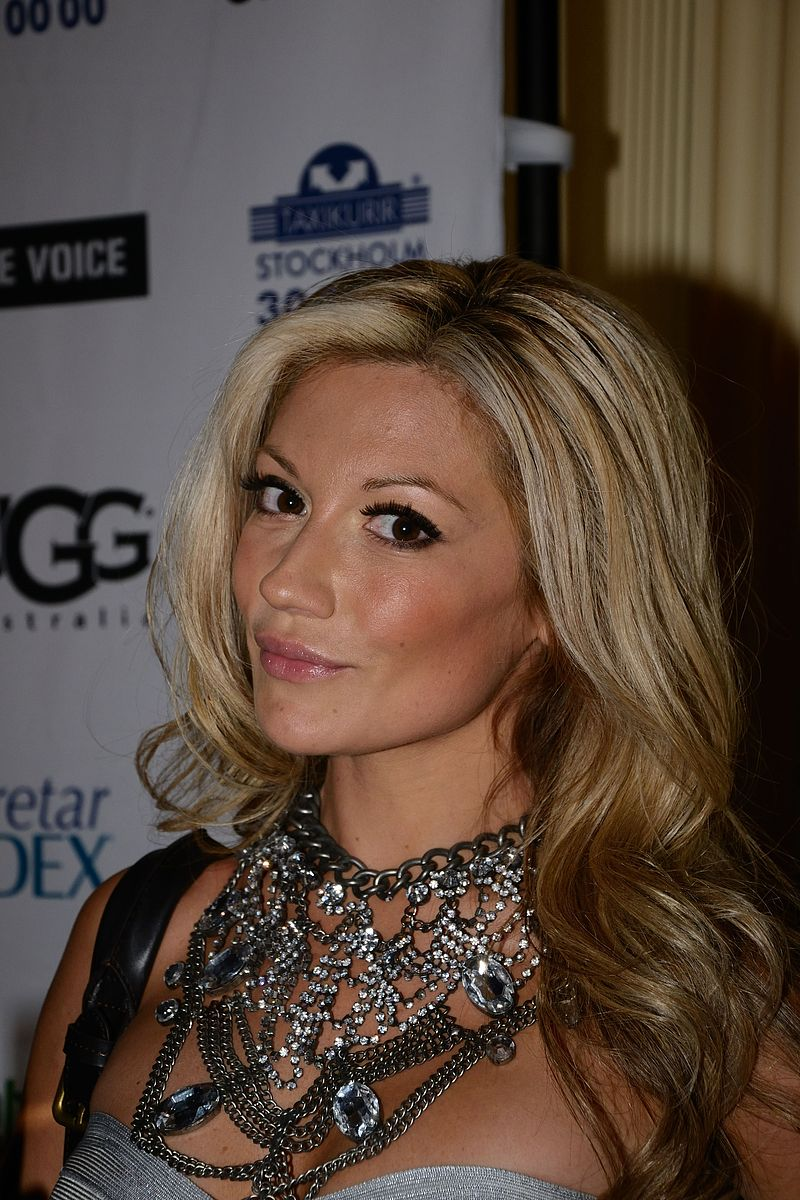
- Elita Löfblad (2011)
- Born: Helita Mariam Löfblad Letelier; 16 August 1980 (age 46); Chile
- Other name: Elita
- Modeling information
- Height: 5 ft 2 in (1.57 m)

Elita Löfblad (born Helita Mariam Löfblad Letelier; 16 August 1980 in Chile) is a Swedish model and reality show contestant, being one of the housemates on Big Brother, which saw her get fans in Norway and throughout Scandinavia. She was born in Chile but grew up in Vällingby, a suburb of Stockholm.

Löfblad has done work for the American Playboy magazine and Swedish Slitz and Moore magazines.
