= 1967 in Swedish television =

This is a list of Swedish television related events from 1967.

== Events ==
- 24 February - Östen Warnerbring is selected to represent Sweden at the 1967 Eurovision Song Contest with his song "Som en dröm". He is selected to be the ninth Swedish Eurovision entry during Melodifestivalen 1967 held in Stockholm.

== Births ==
- 20 July - Agneta Sjödin, TV host

== See also ==
- 1967 in Sweden
