= NonStop Television =

Scandinavian TV company

NonStop Television was a Scandinavian television company, part of Turner Broadcasting System, packaging and distributing a number of specialty channels, mostly to the Scandinavian region. The company is a part of Millennium Media Group. The first channel, now a Nordic version of E!, launched in September 2000.

The channels that was owned or distributed by NonStop Television are:

- Star! Scandinavia, entertainment channel with a name licensed by CTVglobemedia (formerly CHUM Limited) with most of its content taken from CTVglobemedia channels. Broadcasting to the Nordic countries, Baltic countries and Benelux.
- Showtime Scandinavia, action movie channel. The name is licensed by Showtime Networks, Inc., but the channels share no content. Available in the Nordic countries.
- Mezzo, a French language music channel owned by Lagardère Networks International, distributed by NonStop in the Nordic region.
- Silver, "quality" movie channel. Targeting the Nordic countries.
- Voom HD, a high-definition channel made up of content from the different channels owned by Voom. Broadcasting to the Nordic and Baltic countries.
- Luxe TV HD, a high-definition "luxury" channel owned by Lagardère Networks International, distributed by NonStop to the Nordic and Baltic countries.
- TNT7, a Scandinavian version of TNT, previously named TV7 (Sweden).
