= 1960 in Swedish television =

This is a list of Swedish television related events from 1960.

== Events ==
- 2 February – Inger Berggren is selected to represent Sweden at the 1960 Eurovision Song Contest with her song "Alla andra får varann". She is selected to be the third Swedish Eurovision entry during Melodifestivalen held at Cirkus in Stockholm.
- 29 March – France wins the Eurovision Song Contest with the song "Tom Pillibi" by Jacqueline Boyer. Sweden finish in tenth place with the song "Alla andra får varann" by Inger Berggren.

== See also ==
- 1960 in Sweden
