= 2004 in Swedish television =

This is a list of Swedish television related events from 2004.

== Events ==
- 11 April - Johan Becker wins the third season of Fame Factory.
- 10 May - Carolina Gynning wins the fourth season of Big Brother Sverige.
- 2 September - The Swedish version of Pop Idol debuts on TV4.
- 26 November - Daniel Lindström wins the first season of Idol.

== Debuts ==
- 2 September - Idol (2004-2011, 2013–present)

== Television shows ==
- 1-24 December - Allrams höjdarpaket

=== 2000s ===
- Fame Factory (2002–2005)

== Ending this year ==
- Big Brother Sverige (2000-2004, 2011–2012)

== Networks and services ==
=== Launches ===
| Network | Type | Launch date | Notes | Source |
|---|---|---|---|---|
| C More Film | Cable television | Unknown | | |
| Viasat Sport 2 | Cable television | 1 February | | |
| Viasat Sport 3 | Cable television | 1 February | | |
| TV4 Film | Cable television | 18 April | | |
| Canal+ Film 1 | Cable television | 1 May | | |
| Canal+ Film 2 | Cable television | 1 May | | |
| Canal+ Sport | Cable television | 1 May | | |
| Kunskapskanalen | Cable television | 27 September | | |
| Showtime Scandinavia | Cable television | 30 September | | |
| Viasat History | Cable television | 1 November | | |
| The Voice TV Sweden | Cable television | 17 December | | |

== See also ==
- 2004 in Sweden
