= Star! Scandinavia =

- Country: Sweden
- Broadcast area: Nordic countries Benelux; Baltic countries South Africa

Ownership
- Owner: NonStop Television

History
- Launched: 1 September 2000
- Closed: 15 July 2015
- Former names: E!

Links
- Website: nonstop.tv/star

Star! Scandinavia was a television channel in northern Europe that is devoted to entertainment and celebrity news and programming. The channel was managed by Scandinavian television broadcaster NonStop Television, part of Turner Broadcasting.

The channel was fashioned after Star! (a former Canadian entertainment channel now branded as E!, after the U.S.-based channel of the same namesake) and is licensed from Bell Media (previously CTVglobemedia and CHUM Limited). Programming is a mix of several Bell Media television channels such as E!, FashionTelevisionChannel, MuchMore and others. American entertainment news program Showbiz Tonight from HLN is shown several times a day on the channel. Star! Scandinavia has also shown several award shows such as the Grammy Awards, the Golden Globe Awards, the Sundance Film Festival and the BAFTA Film Awards.

== History ==
Star! Scandinavia was launched in September 2000, but was then named E! after its American counterpart on a license with Comcast. A fashion channel called Style broadcast on the same channel during the daytime. E! has licensed its name and brand identity to regional cable television networks in nearly every country worldwide. This includes an international network (set up in Europe during 2005) that is broadcast from the Netherlands across most of Europe (i.e. Scandinavia, France, Ireland, the UK), and joint-venture channels in Israel and throughout Argentina, Brazil and the rest of Latin America. In July 2004 the Scandinavian channel changed its affiliation and was renamed Star! while E! set up their own channel in Europe.

It was originally available in Sweden, Norway, Finland and Denmark, but has since extended its coverage to Iceland, the Netherlands, Belgium and the Baltics. Programmes are not interrupted by commercials but placed in between programs. The channel is operated by NonStop Television, which also operates movie channels Showtime Scandinavia and Silver.

The channel started broadcasting terrestrially in Sweden in the autumn of 2002. It was originally broadcasting for 24 hours per day, but when new licenses were granted in February 2006 the broadcasting hours of the channel were reduced and Star! would broadcast from 6 p.m. to 6 a.m. On 1 May 2010 Star! started broadcasting in South Africa through the TopTV pay TV operator.

Following a deal between Star!'s brand owner, CTVglobemedia (now Bell Media), and Comcast, the original Star! channel in Canada was replaced by E! on 29 November 2010. The rebranding did not affect Star! in Scandinavia.

Star! was closed on 15 July 2015, with a 2002 episode of FashionTelevision, after the episode ended, a slide was seen, the message saying "Thanks", the Star! logo and the website for the channel (it redirected to the Turner website) after which the channel space created by E! in 2000 folded and ceased to exist.

== Logos ==
2000–2004

2004

2004–2015
