= 2000 in Swedish television =

This is a list of Swedish television related events from 2000.

== Events ==
- 13 May - The 45th Eurovision Song Contest is held at the Globe Arena in Stockholm. Denmark wins the contest with the song "Fly on the Wings of Love", performed by Olsen Brothers.
- 4 September - The television reality show Big Brother Sverige debuts on Kanal5.
- 15 December - The first season of Big Brother Sverige is won by Angelica Freij.
- Unknown - Niklas Frisk and Lilian Bokestig win the sixth season of Sikta mot stjärnorna performing as Meat Loaf and Cher.

== Debuts ==
=== Domestic ===
- 4 September - Big Brother Sverige (2000-2004, 2011-2012)

=== International ===
- 4 March - (Japan) Pokémon (1997–present) (TV4)
- 6 October - (United States) The Sopranos (1999-2007)
- (United States) Law & Order: Special Victims Unit (1999–present)

== Television shows ==
- 1-24 December - Ronny & Julia

=== 1990s ===
- Sikta mot stjärnorna (1994-2002)

== Networks and services ==
=== Launches ===
Network	Type	Launch date	Notes	Source
Cartoon Network	Cable television	1 January		
Star! Scandinavia	Cable television	15 September		

== See also ==
- 2000 in Sweden
