= 2005 in Sweden =

- Decades: 1980s; 1990s; 2000s; 2010s; 2020s
- See also: Other events of 2005; Timeline of Swedish history

Events from the year 2005 in Sweden

== Incumbents ==
- Monarch – Carl XVI Gustaf
- Prime Minister – Göran Persson

== Events ==
- 1 January – The train service between Oslo and Stockholm is closed after 133 years.
- 8–9 January – A strong storm, Hurricane Gudrun, hits northern Europe, including southern Sweden. At least 18 people are killed, 300,000 households and 75 million cubic meters of forest are felled.
- 18 January – The company SIBA's CEO Fabian Bengtsson disappears in central Gothenburg, probably kidnapped.
- 3 February – Fabian Bengtsson is found alive in Gothenburg.
- 5 February – Sweden's Prime Minister Göran Persson is appointed an honorary doctor of medicine at Örebro University. The appointment arouses strong protests, as it is considered a reward for the prime minister's having made Örebro University into a university.
- 11 March – Nintendo launches its new game console Nintendo DS in Sweden and the rest of Europe.
- 21 March – An arson attack is carried out against the Communist Party's Röda Stjärnan bookstore in Jönköping.
- 15 April -The Swedish political party Feministisk initiative is founded, but the decision to run in the parliamentary elections was made on 9 September 2005.
- 16 May – Second day of Pentecost is no longer a public holiday in Sweden, because the national day would be instead.
- 29 May- The commemorative note "Tumba Bruk 250 years" is issued, Sveriges riksbank
- 31 May – The Brattås murders.
- 1 June – Smoking ban is introduced in restaurants, pubs and cafes in Sweden.
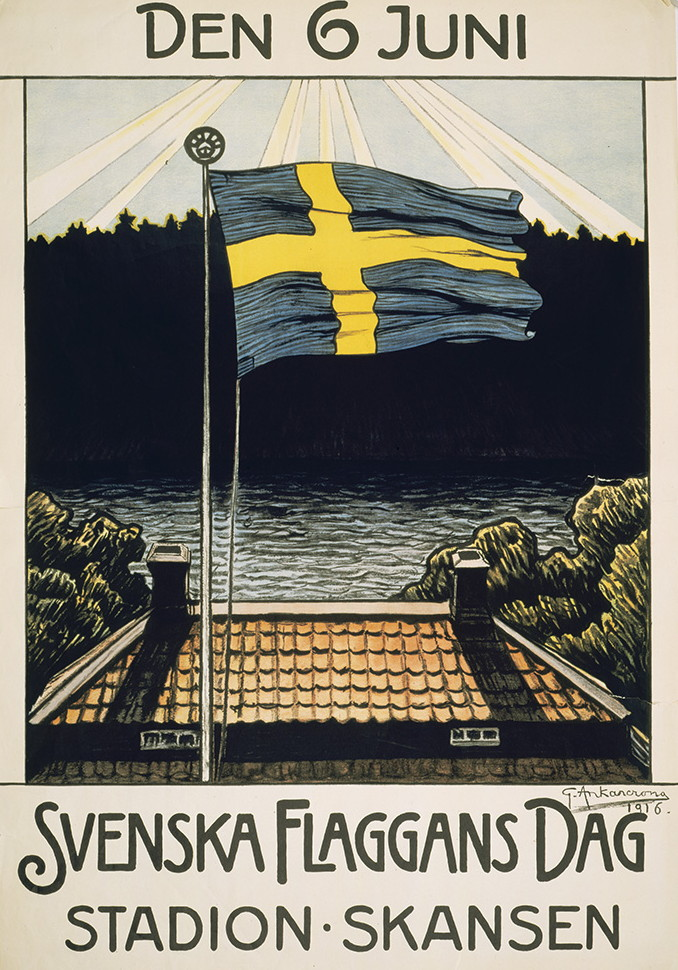
- Swedish national day becomes a public holiday
  6 June – Sweden's national day becomes holiday.
- 10 June – The new Svinesund Bridge is inaugurated and the older bridge is named the Old Svinesund Bridge.
- 1 July – A new Swedish copyright law enters into force. The file sharing debate flares up again.
- 11 September – The Armed Forces' telecommunications network and ground telecommunications unit (FMTM) is established.
- 18 September – The Swedish church holds a church referendum.
- 1 November – The healthcare guarantee starts to apply throughout Sweden.
- 25 November – A Swedish vehicle from the Swedish Foreign Forces is exposed to a bomb attack during a reconnaissance mission in Afghanistan. Two of the four people in the vehicle later died in hospital.
- 3 December – The yuletide in Gävle is lit by two dressed-up men at 9:08 p.m.
- 10 December – The 2005 Nobel Prize (see prize winners below) is awarded as usual in Stockholm's concert hall and in Oslo, with associated ceremonies.

== Popular culture ==
=== Literature ===
- The Girl with the Dragon Tattoo, crime novel by Stieg Larsson
- The Stone Cutter, crime novel by Camilla Läckberg
- Det lysande ögat, children's detective fiction

=== Film ===
- 4 November – Mother of Mine, directed by Klaus Härö, released in Sweden
- 11 November – Made in YU released
- 18 November – Storm released

== Born ==
- 11 March – Axel Sandin-Pellikka, Swedish ice hockey player.

== Deaths ==
- 6 January – Ivan Lidholm, 94, Swedish track and field athlete and sports journalist.
- 13 January – Bengt Janson, 47, Swedish antique dealer, teacher and TV presenter.
- 8 February – Germund Dahlquist, mathematician (born 1925)
- 13 February – Sixten Ehrling, conductor (born 1918)
- 12 May – Monica Zetterlund, singer and actress (born 1937)
- 28 November – Carl Forssell, fencer (born 1917).

=== Full date missing ===
- Anna Westberg, novelist and non-fiction writer (born 1946).

== See also ==
- 2005 in Swedish television
