= 2002 in Swedish television =

This is a list of Swedish television related events in 2002.

== Events ==
- 25 January - Anki Lundberg wins Big Brother Stjärnveckan.
- 13 May - Ulrica Andersson wins the second season of Big Brother Sverige.
- 8 December - Magnus Bäcklund wins the first season of Fame Factory.
- Unknown - Håkan Windahl, performing as Tommy Körberg wins the seventh and final season of Sikta mot stjärnorna.

== Debuts ==
=== Domestic ===
- Unknown - Fame Factory (2002-2005) (TV3)

=== International ===
- 23 December - (United Kingdom) Mr. Bean: The Animated Series (2002-2004, 2015–present) (STV)

== Television shows ==
- 1-24 December - Dieselråttor & sjömansmöss

=== 2000s ===
- Big Brother Sverige (2000-2004, 2011-2012)

== Ending this year ==
- Sikta mot stjärnorna (1994-2002)

== Networks and services ==
=== Launches ===
| Network | Type | Launch date | Notes | Source |
|---|---|---|---|---|
| Viasat Explorer | Cable television | 6 January | | |
| Barnkanalen | Cable television | 23 December | | |
| SVT Extra | Cable television | Unknown | | |

== See also ==
- 2002 in Sweden
