= Voom HD International =

Voom HD
- Broadcast area: Worldwide

Ownership
- Owner: Rainbow Media

History
- Launched: 1 November 2006
- Closed: 1 September 2009

Links
- Website: http://www.voom.com/

Voom HD is a defunct international television channel that provided high-definition programming from various genres. The network was available in over 35 countries in Europe, Asia, and Scandinavia, as well as Africa.

Programming was taken from the various stations owned by Voom HD Networks in the United States and includes Full Frontal Fashion, Earth Diaries and Gamespotting.

A deal between Rainbow Networks and the Stockholm-based company NonStop Television was made in 2006 that allowed NonStop to distribute the channel in Scandinavia, Finland, Iceland and the Baltic states. The channel was launched in Sweden by satellite distributor Canal Digital on 1 November 2006. This was followed by launched in Denmark, Norway, Finland, Estonia and Latvia on various providers. The channel was managed by Scandinavian television broadcaster NonStop Television, part of Turner Broadcasting.

In much of the rest of Europe, Africa, the Middle East and parts of Asia the channel was represented by Zonemedia. In April 2007, they launched the channel in the Arab world via the Orbit platform.

Following Voom HD Networks' eventual collapse, Voom HD closed down between 31 August and 1 September 2009. In many countries, it was either replaced by Rush HD or shut down completely.

Voom HD was replaced by Rush HD on the Canal Digital platform, UPC Austria and in the Czech Republic.
