= 1999 in Swedish television =

This is a list of Swedish television related events from 1999.

== Events ==
- 29 May - Sweden wins the 44th Eurovision Song Contest in Jerusalem. The winning song is "Take Me to Your Heaven", performed by Charlotte Nilsson.
- Unknown - Agneta Sjödin takes over from Lasse Holm as host of Sikta mot stjärnorna.
- Unknown - Tom Nordahl performing as Jon Bon Jovi wins the fifth season of Sikta mot stjärnorna.

== Television shows ==
- 1–24 December - Julens hjältar

=== 1990s ===
- Sikta mot stjärnorna (1994-2002)

== Networks and services ==
=== Launches ===
Network	Type	Launch date	Notes	Source
V Sport	Cable television	1 March		
SVT24	Cable television	15 March		

== See also ==
- 1999 in Sweden
