= Fox (Swedish TV channel) =

Former Swedish TV channel (2014–2021)

- Country: Sweden
- Broadcast area: Sweden
- Headquarters: Stockholm, Sweden; Helsinki, Finland

Programming
- Languages: Swedish and English
- Picture format: 1080i (HDTV)

Ownership
- Owner: Fox Networks Group (Disney Media and Entertainment Distribution)

History
- Launched: 22 September 2014
- Closed: 1 January 2021 (6 years, 3 months and 10 days)

Links
- Website: foxtv.se (archived 27 November 2020)

Fox was a Swedish television channel broadcast in Sweden and owned by the Fox Networks Group, a unit of the Disney Media and Entertainment Distribution division of The Walt Disney Company. It launched on 22 September 2014, and ceased broadcasting on 1 January 2021.

== History ==
In 2005, Fox International Channels (which would later become the Fox Networks Group) applied for permission from the Swedish Post and Telecom Authority to broadcast a Fox digital television channel in Sweden. On 22 September 2014, Fox succeeded in launching the channel in Sweden, with offices based in Stockholm, Sweden, and Helsinki, Finland.

On 20 March 2019, Disney acquired Fox Network Group's owner, 21st Century Fox. On 1 January 2021, the channel ceased broadcasting, with its content moving to Disney+.

== Programming ==
=== Final programming ===
- 9-1-1
- Bless This Mess
- Bull
- Family Guy
- The Jurisdiction
- Modern Family
- Next
- Scorpion
- Scrubs
- The Librarians
- The Resident

=== Former programming ===
- 11.22.63
- 90210
- Angel from Hell
- Baking good, baking bad
- Boomtown
- The Border
- Boys and Girls
- Crossing Jordan
- CSI Miami
- Da Vinci's Demons
- Diggers
- Fargo
- The Good Wife
- Grandma's Boy
- Gränsen
- Hoarders
- Hot Bench
- Jävla finska telefonförsäljare
- Jo
- Kapish!
- Kul med djur
- Limitless
- Madam Secretary
- NCIS: New Orleans
- Numbers
- The Odd Couple
- Sara's New Nordic Kitchen
- The Secrets of Crickley Hall
- Skattgrävare
- Star Trek: Enterprise
- Storage Wars
- Sun, Sex and Suspicious Parents
- Ultimate Airport Dubai
- Wayward Pines
- The World's Best Chefs

=== Former films ===
==== Ab Fox ====
- The Europe’s Most Wanted Madagascar
- Madagascar 3
