= Börje Dorch =

Börje Dorch (17 October 1929 in Malmö – 9 January 2004) was a Swedish draughtsman, journalist and writer who was very active in sports.

Although born in Malmö, Dorch grew up in Södermalm in Stockholm. Signs of a talent in writing were detected early, and he was self-taught, with a self-chiseled style using elaborate yet straightforward language. He was also an accomplished amateur boxer with national team qualifications and it was mainly in boxing where he was active. Dorch founded the Swedish Boxing society journal Boxing and an association called Punchpralinerna (in English, Punch chocolates). He collaborated with childhood friend, the legendary football player Nacka Skoglund with whom he finished his football career, on various advertising assignments, etc.

Has also honed the current Hammarby IF club mark.
