= 2016 in Swedish television =

This is a list of Swedish television related events from 2016.

== Events ==
- 14 May - A Eurovision Song Contest is held at the Ericsson Globe in Stockholm. Ukraine wins the contest with the song "1944", performed by Jamala.
- 20 May - Country and pop singer Elisa Lindström and her partner Yvo Eussen win the eleventh season of Let's Dance.

== Television shows ==
=== 2000s ===
- Idol (2004-2011, 2013–present)
- The Scandinavian version of Big Brother (2005-2006, 2014–present)
- Let's Dance (2006–present)
- Talang Sverige (2007-2011, 2014–present)

== Networks and services ==
=== Launches ===
Network	Type	Launch date	Notes	Source
V Sport Extra	Cable television	8 April		

=== Conversions and rebrandings ===
Old network name	New network name	Type	Conversion Date	Notes	Source
SVT Barkalanen	SVT Barn	Cable television	Unknown		
C More Emotion	C More Stars	Cable television	1 September		

=== Closures ===
Network	Type	End date	Notes	Sources
BBC HD	Cable television	5 January		

== See also ==
- 2016 in Sweden
