= Love and War (2006 film) =

Swedish film directed by Fredrik Emilson

- Directed by: Fredrik Emilson
- Written by: Fredrik Emilson; Fredrik Timour (story)
- Produced by: Tomas Michaelsson
- Starring: See below
- Cinematography: Fredrik Emilson
- Edited by: Fredrik Emilson
- Music by: Fredrik Emilson
- Distributed by: Filmlance International AB
- Release date: 2006
- Running time: 14 minutes
- Country: Sweden
- Languages: Italian, English

Love and War is a 2006 Swedish animated short film directed by Fredrik Emilson.

== Plot ==
In a run down apartment complex, Bunny is looking through a photo album of memories. The pictures start to come to life as she daydreams. At nursing school Bunny sings about how lonely she is. As she walks down the stairs she slips, and her journal falls into the hands of a handsome fighter pilot, Bear. He states how beautiful her smile is. They are soon on a date in which they both realize they are in love with each other. As he flies through the air Bear sings about how madly in love he is. Bunny's dreams are interrupted by a knock on the door (a pig invites her for bacon in which she quickly shuts the door on his face). As her dreams continue, the couple are seen outside a military ball they were invited to. The couple dance and sing to one another. Later in the night Bear is seen outside on one knee ready to propose. Just as the words are said, the General is seen in the doorway. War has begun and there was a red alert. Bear has been called to duty. The couple kiss goodbye and Bear heads out to war. As war goes on Bunny waits at nursing school, worried for her love. After a successful mission, the flight is about to head to base when Bear's plane is shot down. Wounded but not ready to give up, Bear trudges through the wilderness. After shooting down several enemy soldiers, he promises to a picture of Bunny that he will return home. Spotted by the enemy, Bear is shot down at open lines. We return to the apartment where Bunny sings to a portrait of her love of how she misses him. The picture suddenly comes alive and sings back to her. In song, Bear states that life will go on, and it is revealed that Bunny was pregnant and had a child before Bear went to war. As the movie closes, Bunny sings about how her and Bear's love will live on in their child.

== Cast ==
- Marie Alexis as Bunny
- Fredrik Sjöstedt as Bear
- Claes Janson as Frank the Mosquito
- Esa Aapro as General Eagle
- Krister Kern as Bear and Do-Do Boy
- Fredrik Hiller as Sonny and General Eagle

== Awards and honors ==
- Fredrik Emilson and Tomas Michaelsson was awarded "Best Animated/Experimental Short" at the Los Angeles Film Festival.
- Fredrik Emilson was awarded "Nordic Short Film Award" at Nordisk Panorama.

== Soundtrack ==
The music was arranged by Fredrik Emilson, and was performed by Swedish Radio Symphony Orchestra which was conducted by Alexander Hanson. The choir Kungliga Operans Kör was conducted by Cristina Hörnell.
