= C More Sport HD =

- Country: Sweden, Denmark, Finland, Norway

Programming
- Picture format: 1080i

Ownership
- Owner: C More Entertainment

History
- Launched: 3 February 2007

C More Sport HD is a premium high-definition television channel owned by C More Entertainment, which is a part of TV4 AB. It broadcasts sports in high definition.

The channel was launched on 3 February 2007, when the existing HD channel from C More was split into two: Canal+ Film HD and Canal+ Sport HD.

As of January 2008, the channel is only available from the Canal Digital satellite and cable platforms. Competing cable platforms that have launched HDTV, such as Com Hem in Sweden and Stofa in Denmark, only offer Canal+ Film HD.
