= 2014 in Swedish television =

This is a list of Swedish television related events from 2014.

== Events ==
- 9 May - Singer Benjamin Wahlgren Ingrosso and his partner Sigrid Bernson win the ninth season of Let's Dance.
- 18 May - 27-year-old singer and jojkare Jon Henrik Fjällgren wins the sixth season of Talang Sverige.
- 5 December - Lisa Ajax wins the tenth season of Idol.
- 11 December - Anders Olsson wins season three of the Scandinavian version of Big Brother for Sweden, becoming the show's first male winner.

== Debuts ==
- 24 February - Talang Sverige (2007-2011, 2014–present)
- 31 August - The Scandinavian version of Big Brother (2005-2006, 2014–present)

== Television shows ==
=== 2000s ===
- Idol (2004-2011, 2013–present)
- Let's Dance (2006–present)

=== 2010s ===
- 1-24 December - Piratskattens hemlighet

== Networks and services ==
=== Launches ===
Network	Type	Launch date	Notes	Source
Fox	Cable television	22 September		
Paramount Network	Cable television	Unknown		

=== Conversions and rebrandings ===
Old network name	New network name	Type	Conversion Date	Notes	Source
Viasat Explorer	Viasat Explore	Cable television	Unknown		

=== Closures ===
Network	Type	End date	Notes	Sources
Viasat 3D	Cable television	15 January		

== See also ==
- 2014 in Sweden
