= 2003 in Swedish television =

This is a list of Swedish television related events from 2003.

== Events ==
- 20 April - Anders Johansson wins the second season of Fame Factory.
- 11 May - Danne Sörensen wins season 3 of Big Brother Sverige, becoming the show's first male winner.

== Television shows ==
- 1-24 December - Håkan Bråkan

=== 2000s ===
- Big Brother Sverige (2000-2004, 2011-2012)
- Fame Factory (2002-2005)

== Networks and services ==
=== Launches ===
| Network | Type | Launch date | Notes | Source |
|---|---|---|---|---|
| Disney Channel | Cable television | 28 February | | |
| TV4 Plus | Cable television | 9 March | | |

== Deaths ==
| Date | Name | Age | Cinematic Credibility |
|---|---|---|---|
| 24 January | Jeanette von Heidenstam | 79 | Swedish TV host & producer |
| 13 March | Johan Sandström | 62 | Swedish producer & TV host |

== See also ==
- 2003 in Sweden
