= Sportkanalen =

Ownership
- Owner: Modern Times Group

History
- Launched: 23 March 1996; 28 years ago
- Closed: 30 December 1996; 28 years ago

Sportkanalen was a sports channel launched by Kinnevik on 23 March 1996 and is considered the predecessor to Viasat Sport. Its main competitor was the sports channel SuperSport.

The channel closed on 30 December 1996.
