= DiTV =

- Country: Sweden

Ownership
- Owner: Dagens Industri (Bonnier)

History
- Launched: November 7, 2005 (19 years ago)
- Closed: April 1, 2008

Links
- Website: www.di.se/ditv

Availability

DiTV is a Swedish television channel owned by the financial newspaper Dagens Industri.

It was launched on November 7, 2005, initially broadcasting between 6 p.m. and midnight as well as a morning show. The schedule contained financial news, current affairs programmes, documentaries and lifestyle shows.

DiTV was initially available on cable, satellite and broadband television. They did however aim to be a part of the digital terrestrial network. DiTV had applied for a license to broadcast terrestrially before the start of the channel. On November 1, 2005 the Swedish Radio and TV Authority announced that DiTV was among the ten channels that should be prioritized as new channels in the network. On February 23, 2006, the Ministry of Culture did however announce that DiTV would not be granted a license for the terrestrial network. Immediate consequences were that CEO resigned and that the morning show was axed.

On October 2, 2006, the channel was relaunched. Most programmes were cut and the channel would now focus on providing financial news updates two time per hour between 9 a.m. and 11 p.m. on weekdays.

In January 2008, DiTV replaced Finansnytt as the provider of financial news for the current affairs channel TV8. The dedicated DiTV channel will be closed down on April 1, 2008, but DiTV will continue broadcasting on the Internet and as a programme on TV8.
