= 2008 in Swedish television =

This is a list of Swedish television related events from 2008.

== Events ==
- 28 March - TV chef Tina Nordström and her partner Tobias Karlsson win the third season of Let's Dance.
- May - 10-year-old singer Zara Larsson wins the second season of Talang.
- 12 December - Kevin Borg wins the fifth season of Idol.

== Television shows ==
=== 2000s ===
- Idol (2004-2011, 2013–present)
- Let's Dance (2006–present)
- Talang (2007-2011, 2014–present)
- 1–24 December - Skägget i brevlådan

== Networks and services ==
=== Launches ===
Network	Type	Launch date	Notes	Source
TV4 Science Fiction	Cable television	29 February		
Nickelodeon	Cable television	18 June		
V Sport Football	Cable television	17 October		
V Sport Motor	Cable television	17 October		
BBC HD	Cable television	3 December		

=== Conversions and rebrandings ===
Old network name	New network name	Type	Conversion Date	Notes	Source
SVT Barnkalanen	SVTB	Cable television	Unknown		
Aftonbladet TV7	TV7	Cable television	Unknown		

=== Closures ===
Network	Type	End date	Notes	Sources
DiTV	Cable television	1 April		
Viasat Sport 2	Cable television	16 October		
Viasat Sport 3	Cable television	16 October		

== Deaths ==
Date	Name	Age	Cinematic Credibility
12 October	Maud Husberg	73	Swedish TV host

== See also ==
- 2008 in Sweden
