= Investigation Discovery (Swedish TV channel) =

Investigation Discovery Sweden
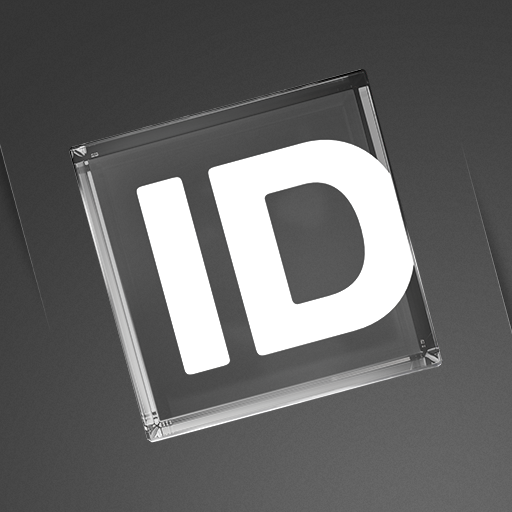
- Country: United Kingdom
- Broadcast area: Sweden

Ownership
- Owner: Discovery Networks Northern Europe

History
- Launched: 1 June 2015; 10 years ago
- Replaced: Investigation Discovery Europe

Links
- Website: dplay.se/kanaler/id

Investigation Discovery Sweden is a Swedish television channel operated by Discovery Networks Sweden focused on crime-related programming.

The European version of Investigation Discovery had been broadcasting to Sweden since 2010, but was initially not widely available through major distributors. On 1 October 2014 it was added to the leading cable network Com Hem. It was added by satellite operator Canal Digital on December 15. In January 2015, Discovery bought the terrestrial broadcasting license held by multicultural channel Kanal Global. That channel stopped broadcasting on 15 February 2015 and Investigation Discovery took over the license after that. The transaction was accepted by the Swedish Broadcasting Authority and the license is valid until 2020.

On 1 June 2015 the European channel was replaced by Investigation Discovery Sweden with content adapted for the Swedish market. The first original Swedish programme to air on the channel was Brottscentralen, a live crime show produced by Aftonbladet. Brottscentralen premiered on Investigation Discovery on 31 August 2015.

During its first seven months on air, the channel achieved a 0.5 percent share of viewing and reached 1.8 percent of the population each week.
