= C More First HD =

Television Channel in Nordic countries

- Country: Sweden, Denmark, Finland, Norway
- Network: Canal Digital

Programming
- Picture format: 1080p

Ownership
- Owner: C More Entertainment

History
- Launched: 1 September 2005
- Former names: C More HD, Canal+ HD, Canal + Film HD

Availability

Terrestrial
- dna Welho Finland: Channel 95

C More First HD is a high-definition television channel owned by C More Entertainment showing movies and television series in the Nordic countries.

The channel was launched as C More HD on 1 September 2005. It was then the first HDTV channel targeting the Nordic countries broadcasting with MPEG-2 compression from the Thor 2 satellite and MPEG-4 with cable on the Canal Digital platform. The content consisted of three movies every evening. On 1 November 2006, it was rebranded as Canal+ HD and is now broadcasting H.264.

The Swedish cable distributor Com Hem launched HDTV on December 12th, 2006, and then included Canal+ HD in its offerings. In early February 2007, C More launched another HD channel. Canal+ HD was then renamed Canal+ Film HD and the new channel was named Canal+ Sport HD.

== See also ==
- Canal+
- C More First
- C More Hits
- C More Action
- Canal+ Sport
- Canal+ Sport 2
