= 2007 in Swedish television =

This is a list of Swedish television related events from 2007.

== Events ==
- 30 March - Wrestler Martin Lidberg and his partner Cecilia Ehrling win the second season of Let's Dance.
- 1 June - Ventriloquist Zillah & Totte win the first season of Talang.
- 7 August - Major parts of southern Sweden is affected by a two hours-long television outage after 18.00 PM during the Tuesday afternoon. At 20.10 PM, the picture is back.
- 15 October - The shutdown of analog television in Sweden is completed.
- 7 December - Marie Picasso wins the fourth season of Idol.

== Debuts ==
- 13 April - Talang (2006-2011, 2014–present)

== Television shows ==
=== 2000s ===
- Idol (2004-2011, 2013–present)
- Let's Dance (2006–present)
- 1–24 December - En riktig jul

== Networks and services ==
=== Launches ===
Network	Type	Launch date	Notes	Source
Viasat Golf	Cable television	January		
C More Sport HD	Cable television	3 February		
TV4 HD	Cable television	28 May		
Canal+ Comedy	Cable television	1 November		

=== Conversions and rebrandings ===
Old network name	New network name	Type	Conversion Date	Notes	Source
ONE Television	Kanal 9	Cable television	25 February		
Canal+ Film 2	Canal+ Hits	Cable television	1 November		
Canal+ Film 1	Canal+ First	Cable television	Unknown		

=== Closures ===
Network	Type	End date	Notes	Sources
SVT Extra	Cable television	Unknown		

== See also ==
- List of Swedish television ratings for 2007
- 2007 in Sweden
