= Fight+ =

- Country: United Kingdom
- Broadcast area: Denmark; Finland; Norway; Sweden; United Kingdom

Ownership
- Owner: Fight+ Limited

History
- Launched: 31 January 2006; 19 years ago 1 March 2006 (in Scandinavia)
- Closed: 11 December 2006

Links
- Website: Official Site

Fight+ was a British and European combat sports TV channel founded by David McConachie and Steffen Tangstad.

Fight+ showed movies, documentaries, classic and exclusive matches, training and educational programming and news. The channel was launched at the end of January 2006 on a British Sky satellite provider. The plan was for Fight+ to become available all over Europe as fast as possible. The channel started broadcasting in Scandinavia on 1 March 2006.

Fight+ closed down on 11 December 2006, according to Canal Digital website. According to the same website the channel is closing because there hasn't been enough interest from customers of Canal Digital, and they've also had problems finding new investors.

== Programming ==
The channel broadcast programming on amateur and professional wrestling; boxing, kickboxing, Muay Thai, Mixed martial arts, Kung-Fu, judo and karate; cagefighting, bodybuilding, and strength athletics.
