= Showtime Scandinavia =

- Country: Denmark, Finland, Norway, Sweden
- Broadcast area: Nordic countries

Ownership
- Owner: NonStop Television

History
- Launched: 30 September 2004
- Closed: 15 July 2015

Links
- Website: http://www.nonstop.tv/showtime

Availability

Terrestrial
- dna Welho (Finland): Channel 86

Showtime Scandinavia (generally referred to simply as Showtime) was a television channel broadcasting action movies to the Nordic countries operated by NonStop Television. Its name and logo were licensed by Showtime Networks Inc., owners of the American Showtime. The two channels however do not share any programme content.

Showtime Scandinavia was closed on 15 July 2015.

In September 2022, Showtime reentered the Scandinavian market with the introduction of SkyShowtime.

== History ==
NonStop Television received a license for a channel with the working title NonStop Film in January 2004 when the government awarded new licenses for the terrestrial network (DTT). The channel was put into the new fifth multiplex that covered 50 percent of the country.

The channel was named Showtime and started broadcasting at 18:00 hrs. (CET) on 30 September 2004. It was then available from Boxer TV Access (DTT in Sweden), Canal Digital satellite throughout the Nordic countries and cable services.

In 2005, the channel became available in the basic analogue package for the Canal Digital cable viewers in Norway.

In February 2006, the Swedish government took back Showtime's terrestrial license. NonStop Television were however awarded a new license for a channel called Nonstop Filmfestival (working title). The channel was named Silver and replaces Showtime in May 2006.

== Content ==
The programming consists almost entirely of action movies (and programmes about movies) dating from the 1970s to more recent days.

Movies are delivered by several distributors, such as Buena Vista International Television, Fox, MGM, Paramount and Universal.

Subtitling is available in Norwegian, Swedish, Danish and Finnish.

== Availability ==
According to NonStop, the channel is available to approximately 1 million households as of February 2006.

Via satellite, the channel is distributed through Canal Digital. As of 2006, the channel is added as a bonus when buying both the Canal+ and Family package. The channel isn't (as of 2006) available through Viasat.

Showtime is available through many cable distributors, including Canal Digital, Com Hem (Sweden), HTV (Finland), TDC (Denmark) and UPC (Sweden and Norway).

Since December 2009 the same NonStop Television has started also a "Showtime Baltics" channel in Estonia, which in 2010 should start to operate in Latvia and Lithuania as well.
