= 2010 in Swedish television =

This is a list of Swedish television related events from 2010.

== Events ==
- 26 March - Singer and finalist from the fourth season of Idol Mattias Andréasson and his partner Cecilia Ehrling win the fifth season of Let's Dance.
- 4 June - 14-year-old opera singer Jill Svensson wins the fourth season of Talang 2010.
- 10 December - Jay Smith wins the seventh season of Idol.

== Television shows ==
=== 2000s ===
- Idol (2004-2011, 2013–present)
- Let's Dance (2006–present)
- Talang (2007-2011, 2014–present)

=== 2010s ===
- 1–24 December - Hotell Gyllene knorren

== Networks and services ==
=== Launches ===
Network	Type	Launch date	Notes	Source
MTV Viihde	Cable television	1 April		
Canal+ Hockey	Cable television	27 August		
Nick Jr.	Cable television	1 September		
TV10	Cable television	7 September		
Boomerang	Cable television	30 September		
Viasat 3D	Cable television	27 December		

=== Conversions and rebrandings ===
Old network name	New network name	Type	Conversion Date	Notes	Source
Discovery Travel & Living	TLC	2 December	Cable television		

=== Closures ===
Network	Type	End date	Notes	Sources
Canal+ Comedy	Cable television	31 March		
ZTV	Cable television	1 August		
SVT HD	Cable television	20 September		

== See also ==
- 2010 in Sweden
