= 2012 in Swedish television =

This is a list of Swedish television related events from 2012.

== Events ==
- 23 March - Ulf Nilsson wins the first season of The Voice Sverige.
- 26 May - Sweden wins the 57th Eurovision Song Contest in Baku, Azerbaijan. The winning song is "Euphoria", performed by Loreen.
- 1 June - Footballer Anton Hysén and his partner Sigrid Bernson win the seventh season of Let's Dance.
- 3 June - Hanna Johansson wins the sixth season of Big Brother.
- 9 September - Launch of the Swedish version of The X Factor.
- 7 December - Awa Santesson-Sey wins the first season of X Factor.

== Debuts ==
=== International ===
- 9 April - (United States) Alcatraz (2012) (TV4)

== Television shows ==
=== 2000s ===
- Let's Dance (2006–present)

=== 2010s ===
- 1–24 December - Mysteriet på Greveholm: Grevens återkomst

== Ending this year ==
- Big Brother Sverige (2000–2004, 2011-2012)

== Networks and services ==
=== Launches ===
Network	Type	Launch date	Notes	Source
TV4 News	Cable television	24 January		
TV1000 Drama	Cable television	16 February		
TV4 Fakta XL	Cable television	13 August		
C More Tennis	Cable television	4 September		

=== Conversions and rebrandings ===
Old network name	New network name	Type	Conversion Date	Notes	Source
V Series	Viasat Film Drama	Cable television	3 March		
Canal+ Family	C More Kids	Cable television	Unknown		
Canal+ Hockey	C More Hockey	Cable television	Unknown		
Canal+ Hits	C More Hits	Cable television	Unknown		
Canal+ First	C More First	Cable television	Unknown		
SVTB	SVT Barnkalanen	Cable television	Unknown		
TNT7	TNT	Cable television	Unknown		

=== Closures ===
Network	Type	End date	Notes	Sources
TV4 Science Fiction	Cable television	5 August		

== See also ==
- 2012 in Sweden
