= 2009 in Swedish television =

This is a list of Swedish television related events from 2009.

== Events ==
- 27 March - Strongman Magnus Samuelsson and his partner Annika Sjöö win the fourth season of Let's Dance.
- 12 June - 30-year-old magician Charlie Caper wins the third season of Talang.
- 11 December - Erik Grönwall wins the sixth season of Idol.

== Television shows ==
=== 2000s ===
- Idol (2004-2011, 2013–present)
- Let's Dance (2006–present)
- Talang (2007-2011, 2014–present)
- 1–24 December - Superhjältejul

== Networks and services ==
=== Launches ===
Network	Type	Launch date	Notes	Source
Comedy Central	Cable television	1 January		
TV1000 Drama	Cable television	16 February		
V Sport Hockey	Cable television	1 September		
Disney XD	Cable television	12 September		
SF-kanalen	Cable television	1 October		

=== Closures ===
Network	Type	End date	Notes	Sources
Kanal Lokal	Cable television	19 January		

== See also ==
- 2009 in Sweden
