= 2013 in Swedish television =

This is a list of Swedish television related events from 2013.

== Events ==
- 18 May - The 58th Eurovision Song Contest is held at the Malmö Arena in Malmö. Denmark wins the contest with the song "Only Teardrops", performed by Emmelie de Forest.
- 31 May - Rapper Markoolio and his partner Cecilia Ehrling win the eighth season of Let's Dance.
- 6 December - Kevin Walker wins the ninth season of Idol.

== Debuts ==
- 19 August - Idol (2004–2011, 2013–present)

== Television shows ==
=== 2000s ===
- Let's Dance (2006–present)

=== 2010s ===
- 1–24 December - Barna Hedenhös uppfinner julen

== Networks and services ==
=== Conversions and rebrandings ===
Old network name	New network name	Type	Conversion Date	Notes	Source
V Series	Viasat Film Drama	Cable television	3 March		

=== Closures ===
Network	Type	End date	Notes	Sources
TV4 News	Cable television	31 August		

== See also ==
- 2013 in Sweden
