= C More Film =

Ownership
- Owner: C More Entertainment
- Sister channels: C More Film 2

History
- Launched: 2004
- Closed: 2006

C More Film was a Scandinavian television channel that showed movies from the 1960s, 1970s, 1980s and 1990s.

The sister channel, C More Film 2, started in 2005.
