= Sikta mot stjärnorna =

- Country of origin: Sweden
- Original language: Swedish

Original release
- Network: TV4
- Release: 9 September 1994 – 12 May 2002

Sikta mot stjärnorna (in English: Aiming for the stars) is a Swedish singing talent show that was broadcast on TV4 between 1994 until 2002. The show featured people acting and imitating their favorite singers/bands performances. From the 1996 season and forward the show worked as the Swedish pre-selection for the European final called European Soundmix Show. Several of Sweden's most known singers performed on the show before launching their singing careers.
