= Silver (TV channel) =

- Country: Sweden
- Broadcast area: Nordic countries, Baltic countries

Ownership
- Owner: NonStop Television

History
- Launched: May 26, 2006
- Closed: July 15, 2015

Links
- Website: http://www.nonstop.tv/silver/

Availability

Terrestrial
- Boxer (Sweden): Channel 17
- dna Welho (Finland): Channel 88

Silver was a movie television channel broadcasting to the Nordic countries broadcasting quality movies, "World cinema" and independent films. The channel was managed by Scandinavian television broadcaster NonStop Television, part of Turner Broadcasting.

The owners NonStop Television applied for a license to broadcast a channel with the working name "NonStop Filmfestival" in the Swedish digital terrestrial network in the autumn of 2005. The government gave the channel a license in February 2006, at the expense of the owner's other movie channel, Showtime Scandinavia. NonStop Filmfestival had to launch before the end of May and Showtime was allowed to continue broadcasting until the new channel started.

NonStop Filmfestival was named "Silver" in April and could start broadcasting on May 26, 2006, during the Cannes Film Festival. The opening night included Velvet Goldmine, Wild at Heart and Millennium Hambo. Initially, the channel was only available in Sweden on the Boxer terrestrial platform and it wasn't available on from any other distributor until April 2, 2007, when it launched on the Swedish Com Hem cable network.

In February 2007, it was announced that the channel would launch on the 3 mobile phone platform in Sweden. This launch occurred on April 16 and NonStop claimed that Silver was the first movie channel in Europe to be available on a mobile platform. On the same day, it was announced that Silver would launch on satellite from Canal Digital in Finland, Sweden, Norway and Denmark on May 1 and that a high-definition version called "Silver HD" would launch on September 1, 2007. After the launch on Canal Digital satellite, it has expanded to other cable networks such as LumoTV in Finland and Get in Norway.

It was on Astra for the South African market. It was being bought by Top TV, a division of On Digital Media (ODM). It was launched in May 2010.

Silver ceased operations on July 15, 2015;
