= Fame Factory =

Swedish reality TV show

Fame Factory is a Swedish reality television show structured in the form of Star Academy series also known under that name (Star Academy) in France or various names like Fame Academy in the UK, Operación Triunfo in Spain etc.

Fame Factory was launched in 2002 on the Swedish channel TV3 and was hosted for four seasons by Bert Karlsson. For all seasons, the Academy was held at Skara with the final each year held at various location: at Paroc-fabriken in Skövde for season one (2002), at the Olssons Lada also in Skövde for season two won by (2003), at Hovet in Stockholm season three (2004, in two legs, winter and spring) and the Skara market town (season four in 2005).

The instructors for the Academy school was Mikael Gordon-Solfors and the program was produced by the Swedish production company Strix and by Joachim Janckert. The principals for the academy were Micke Grahn (for season one and first leg of season three), Monica Einarson (for season two), Bengt Palmers (for second leg of season three) and Lotta Engberg (season four). The program was suspended after four seasons.

Winners were Magnus Bäcklund in season one in 2002, Anders Johansson in season two in 2003, Johan Becker in season three (2004) and Sandra Oxenryd in the final season four (2005).

The winner of season one Magnus Bäcklund was paired with contestant Jessica Andersson to form the duo Fame. The duo won the Melodifestivalen 2003 and represented Sweden in the Eurovision Song Contest 2003 with "Give Me Your Love" finishing fifth in the competition, while the winner of season four, Sandra Oxenryd, represented Estonia in the Eurovision Song Contest 2006 but failed to qualify for the final.

== Contestants ==
=== Season 1 (2002) ===
- Magnus Bäcklund (winner)
- Jessica Andersson
- Andrés Esteche
- Anna-Klara Folin
- Fernando Fuentes Vargas
- Mathias Holmgren
- Markus Landgren
- Victoria Limenza
- David Lindgren
- Michael Michailoff
- Wiktoria Nilsson
- Maria Pensar
- Patrik Rasmussen
- Emil Sigfridsson
- Hannah Westin

=== Season 2 (2003) ===
- Anders Johansson (Winner)
- Johanna Bjurenstedt Gustafsson
- David Castaneda
- Simon Forsberg
- Ida Hedberg
- Morgan Johansson
- Sophie Johansson
- Ulrika Lundkvist
- Mia Löfgren
- Dajana Lööf
- Martin Nilsson
- Per Norberg
- Dennis Radoicic
- Peter Simson
- Jerker Tenenbaum
- Johan Thorsell

=== Season 3 (2003) ===
Held in two legs (winter and spring)

- Johan Becker (Winner)
- Theresa Andréasson
- Sabina Baltzar-Roth
- Calle Bergström
- Johan Bergström
- Sandra Dahlberg
- Martina Edoff
- Elena Ermanova
- Fredrik Furu
- Maja Gullstrand
- Elin Hedberg
- Pauline Högberg
- Jimmy Jansson
- Sara Löfgren
- Karl Martindahl (runner-up)
- Andreas Martinelle
- Annie Nordin
- Andreas Novak
- Martin Olsen
- Katja Ottosson
- Modupeh Sowe
- Carola Szücs
- Andreas Wistrand
- Robert Zuddas
- Marcus Öhrn
- Johan Östberg (third)

=== Season 4 (2005) ===
- Sandra Oxenryd (Winner)
- Pontus Assarsson (finalist)
- Linda Bengtzing
- Andrea Bonde
- Annis Brander
- Camilla Håkansson
- Andreas Johansson
- Emma Karlsson (finalist)
- Victoria Limenza
- Anders Nystedt
- Jessica Olsson
- Mikaela Pettersson
- Ida Pihlgren (finalist)
- Johanna Sailon
- Alexander Schöld
- Staffan Stridsberg
- Ida Sundelius
- Patrik Öhlund (finalist)
