= Big Brother (Norwegian and Swedish TV series) =

- This is the logo of the show
- Presented by: Brita Møystad Engseth (2005–2006); Hannah Rosander (2006); Adam Alsing (2005; 2014); Pia Lykke (2014)
- No. of seasons: Sweden: 9 Norway: 5
- No. of episodes: 374

Production
- Production locations: Early seasons: Värtahamnen Sweden and Spånga Sweden Later seasons: Farsta Sweden and Stockholm Sweden
- Running time: 60 to 90 minutes
- Production company: Endemol

Original release
- Network: Sweden Kanal5 (2005–2006); Norway FEM (2005–2006; 2014); Sweden Kanal 9 (2014)
- Release: 29 January 2005 – 4 May 2021

The Sweden & Norway joint edition of Big Brother is a reality show shown on Kanal 5 in Sweden, and FEM in Norway, in which a number of contestants live in an isolated house trying to avoid being evicted by the public with the aim of winning a large cash prize at the end of the run. It is based on the Big Brother series produced by Endemol.

From 2000 on, seasons of Big Brother were shown in both Norway and Sweden and in both countries the show enjoyed very high ratings, so high that eventually the production teams of both began thinking about joining to make one Big Brother show for both countries. In 2005, they joined forces.

The 2006 season was also a co-production between Norwegian and Swedish Big Brother. For this season Adam Alsing left the show, and Hannah Rosander took over as the Swedish host. There was also a Big Brother Exchange twist with Big Brother Thailand as well. Following the second season in 2006 the show was cancelled in both Sweden and Norway.

On 31 August 2014 the third joint season of Big Brother between Norway and Sweden premiered on Kanal 9 in Sweden and FEM in Norway.

== First joint season ==
The 2005 season was a co-production with Big Brother Norway, in which nine Swedes and nine Norwegians were put together in the house. The live shows were hosted by Adam Alsing as well as the Norwegian host Brita Møystad Engseth.

In the first season of the show the contestants were initially divided into two houses depending on which country they came from but following the first eviction the houses were joined but contestants were still divided into two teams. The team format was an on and off part of the show as some weeks contestants could win individual immunity from eviction through competitions and those who did not win could nominate anyone from either team and could also be nominated from either team.

Towards the end of the series, for one week the public got to nominate and the housemates had to vote evict, they evicted Tina. In another twist, a week later the public were given the choice of which one of three evicted housemates could return to the house and in a surprising result, Tina was voted back into the house. A few weeks later, Carl and Kenneth were fake evicted to a secret room in the house and were both nominated, Kenneth was evicted. Just a few days later, and Carl returned to the house. In the end, it was Britt, the 22-year-old non-original housemate from Norway who won with 47% of the vote.

Famous faces from that year was Swede Elita Löfblad who went on to get a successful modeling career, and Aylar Lie who was a guest star on the show.

=== Housemates ===
| Name | Country | Day entered | Day exited | Result |
|---|---|---|---|---|
| Britt Goodwin | Norway | Day 16 | Day 114 | Winner |
| Tina Kling | Sweden | Day 1 Day 72 | Day 65; Day 114 | Runner-up |
| Klas Andersen | Sweden | Day 1 | Day 114 | 3rd Place |
| Carl Fredrik Schou | Norway | Day 1 | Day 114 | 4th Place |
| Anders Foss | Norway | Day 1 | Day 110 | Evicted |
| Kristian Lund | Norway | Day 1 | Day 107 | Evicted |
| Annicka Elm | Sweden | Day 90 | Day 107 | Evicted |
| Elita Löfblad | Sweden | Day 1 | Day 100 | Evicted |
| Kenneth M. Forsberg | Sweden | Day 70 | Day 97 | Evicted |
| Aylar Lie | Norway | Day 86 | Day 91 | Walked |
| Laila Robe Ludvigsen | Norway | Day 1 | Day 86 | Evicted |
| Jenny Falck | Sweden | Day 81 | Day 86 | Evicted |
| Madeleine Christensen | Norway | Day 81 | Day 86 | Evicted |
| Patrick Strøm | Norway | Day 1 | Day 79 | Evicted |
| Liselotte Nilsson | Sweden | Day 65 | Day 72 | Evicted |
| Dennis Lindqvist | Sweden | Day 1 | Day 68 | Walked |
| Michael Wibecan | Norway | Day 58 | Day 60 | Walked |
| Denis Babic | Sweden | Day 30 | Day 58 | Evicted |
| Hannah Brandt | Sweden | Day 1 | Day 51 | Evicted |
| Line Rødli Kristiansen | Norway | Day 1 | Day 44 | Evicted |
| Terese Haraldsen | Norway | Day 1 | Day 37 | Evicted |
| Alessandra Zannin | Sweden | Day 16 | Day 30 | Evicted |
| Jozephine Dahl | Sweden | Day 1 | Day 23 | Evicted |
| Sebastian Rydén | Sweden | Day 1 | Day 16 | Evicted |
| Nurcan Nasufovska | Sweden | Day 4 | Day 13 | Walked |
| Beate Leiren | Norway | Day 1 | Day 11 | Walked |
| Alečko Akšamija | Sweden | Day 1 | Day 9 | Evicted |
| Ørjan Johansson | Norway | Day 1 | Day 9 | Evicted |
| Cipi Jugovic | Sweden | Day 1 | Day 4 | Walked |

=== Nominations table ===
| | Week 1 | Week 2 | Week 3 | Week 4 | Week 5 | Week 6 | Week 7 | Week 8 | Week 9 | Week 10 | Week 12 | Week 13 | Week 14 | Week 15 | Week 16 | | |
| | Week 1 | Week 2 | Week 3 | Week 4 | Week 5 | Week 6 | Week 7 | Week 8 | Week 9 | Week 10 | Week 12 | Week 13 | Week 14 | Week 15 | Day 110 | Final | |
|---|---|---|---|---|---|---|---|---|---|---|---|---|---|---|---|---|---|
| Britt | Not in house | | Exempt | Exempt | ? ? | Exempt | Exempt | ? ? | Tina | No nominations | ? ? | Kenneth; Carl | Annicka; Klas | No nominations | No nominations | Winner (Day 114) | |
| Tina | No nominations | Jozephine; Hannah | Dennis; Jozephine | Dennis; Hannah | Exempt | Klas ? | ? ? | Exempt | Nominated | Exempt | Elita; Klas | Elita; Klas | Elita; Klas | No nominations | No nominations | Runner up (Day 114) | |
| Klas | No nominations | Tina ? | Hannah ? | Alessandra; Tina | Exempt | ? Line | ? ? | Exempt | Tina | No nominations | ? ? | Tina; Kenneth | Tina; Annicka | No nominations | No nominations | Third Place (Day 114) | |
| Carl | No nominations | Exempt | Exempt | Exempt | ? ? | Klas; Laila | Exempt | Exempt | Tina | No nominations | Tina; Laila | Anders; Tina | Exempt | No nominations | No nominations | Fourth Place (Day 114) | |
| Anders | Carl; Line; Örjan | Exempt | Exempt | Exempt | ? ? | Exempt | Exempt | ? ? | Laila | No nominations | Laila; Carl | Carl; Tina | Klas; Tina | No nominations | No nominations | Evicted (Day 110) | |
| Kristian | No nominations | Exempt | Exempt | Exempt | ? ? | Exempt | Exempt | ? ? | Laila | No nominations | Klas ? | Kenneth; Carl | Tina; Klas | No nominations | Evicted (Day 107) | | |
| Annicka | Not in house | | | | | | | | | | | Exempt | Klas; Tina | No nominations | Evicted (Day 107) | | |
| Elita | No nominations | Tina; Sebastian | ? Klas | Tina; Hannah | Exempt | Exempt | ? ? | ? ? | Tina | No nominations | ? Kenneth | Tina; Kenneth | Tina; Anders | Evicted (Day 100) | | | |
| Kenneth | Not in house | | | | | | | | | No nominations | Laila; Kristian | Tina; Kristian | Evicted (Day 97) | | | | |
| Laila | No nominations | Exempt | Exempt | Exempt | ? ? | Line ? | Exempt | Exempt | Nominated | No nominations | ? ? | Evicted (Day 86) | | | | | |
| Patrick | No nominations | Exempt | Exempt | Exempt | ? ? | Line ? | Exempt | Exempt | Tina | No nominations | Evicted (Day 79) | | | | | | |
| Liselotte | Not in house | | | | | | | | Laila | No nominations | Evicted (Day 79) | | | | | | |
| Dennis | No nominations | Tina; Sebastian | Elita; Jozephine | Tina; Alessandra | Exempt | Tina ? | ? ? | ? ? | Tina | Walked (Day 68) | | | | | | | |
| Michael | Not in house | | | | | | | | Walked (Day 60) | | | | | | | | |
| Denis | Not in house | | | | | Exempt | ? ? | ? ? | Evicted (Day 58) | | | | | | | | |
| Hannah | No nominations | Sebastian; Tina | Klas; Elita | Alessandra; Klas | Exempt | Exempt | ? ? | Evicted (Day 51) | | | | | | | | | |
| Line | No; Nominations | Exempt | Exempt | Exempt | ? ? | Klas ? | Evicted (Day 44) | | | | | | | | | | |
| Therese | No; Nominations | Exempt | Exempt | Exempt | ? ? | Evicted (Day 37) | | | | | | | | | | | |
| Alessandra | Not in house | | Elita ? | Hannah; Tina | Evicted (Day 30) | | | | | | | | | | | | |
| Jozephine | No nominations | Tina; Sebastian | Dennis ? | Evicted (Day 23) | | | | | | | | | | | | | |
| Sebastian | Alecko; Dennis; Elita | Tina; Jozephine | Evicted (Day 16) | | | | | | | | | | | | | | |
| Nurcan | Not in house | Hannah; Jozephine | Walked (Day 13) | | | | | | | | | | | | | | |
| Beate | No nominations | Walked (Day 11) | | | | | | | | | | | | | | | |
| Alecko | No nominations | Evicted (Day 9) | | | | | | | | | | | | | | | |
| Örjan | No nominations | Evicted (Day 9) | | | | | | | | | | | | | | | |
| Cipi | Walked (Day 4) | | | | | | | | | | | | | | | | |
| Notes | 1, 2 | 3, 4 | 3, 5, 6 | 3, 7 | 8 | 9 | 3 | 10 | 11 | 12, 13 | 14, 15 | 16, 17, 18 | 19, 20 | 21, 22 | | | |
| Up for eviction | Carl; Örjan | Sebastian; Tina | Dennis; Elita; Hannah; Jozephine | Alessandra; Tina | Kristian; Line; Therese | Klas; Line | Hannah; Tina | Anders; Denis | Laila-22% Tina-24% | All housemates | Kenneth; Laila; Tina | Carl; Kenneth; Tina | Elita; Klas; Tina | All housemates | | | |
| Up for eviction | Alecko; Elita | Sebastian; Tina | Dennis; Elita; Hannah; Jozephine | Alessandra; Tina | Kristian; Line; Therese | Klas; Line | Hannah; Tina | Anders; Denis | Laila-22% Tina-24% | All housemates | Kenneth; Laila; Tina | Carl; Kenneth; Tina | Elita; Klas; Tina | All housemates | | | |
| Walked | Cipi | Beate; Nurcan | none | | | | | | Michael | Dennis | none | | | | | | |
| Evicted | Örjan; Most votes to evict | Sebastian; Most votes to evict | Jozephine; Most votes to evict | Alessandra; Most votes to evict | Therese; Most votes to evict | Line; Most votes to evict | Hannah; 61% to evict | Denis; 63% to evict | Tina; 6 of 9 votes to evict | Tina; 76% to return | Laila; 41% to evict | Kenneth; 19% to fake evict | Kenneth; Most votes to evict | Annicka; 1% (out of 7) to win | Anders; 7% (out of 7) to win | Carl; 12% (out of 4) to win | Klas; 13% (out of 4) to win |
| Evicted | Alecko; Most votes to evict | Sebastian; Most votes to evict | Jozephine; Most votes to evict | Alessandra; Most votes to evict | Therese; Most votes to evict | Line; Most votes to evict | Hannah; 61% to evict | Denis; 63% to evict | Tina; 6 of 9 votes to evict | Liselotte; 1% to save | Laila; 41% to evict | Carl; 25% to fake evict | Elita; 57% to evict | Kristian; 5% (out of 7) to win | Anders; 7% (out of 7) to win | Tina; 28% (out of 4) to win | Britt; 47% (out of 4) to win |
| Evicted | Alecko; Most votes to evict | Sebastian; Most votes to evict | Jozephine; Most votes to evict | Alessandra; Most votes to evict | Therese; Most votes to evict | Line; Most votes to evict | Hannah; 61% to evict | Denis; 63% to evict | Tina; 6 of 9 votes to evict | Patrick; 2% to save | Laila; 41% to evict | Carl; 25% to fake evict | Elita; 57% to evict | Kristian; 5% (out of 7) to win | Anders; 7% (out of 7) to win | Tina; 28% (out of 4) to win | Britt; 47% (out of 4) to win |

=== Notes ===
Housemates on the Norway team
Housemates on the Sweden team
Housemate is either exempt or is team captain

- ^1 Only the team captains could nominate.
- ^2 Dennis and Line won immunity in a competition.
- ^3 Team Norway won the competition, meaning Sweden must nominate this week.
- ^4 As a new housemate Nurcan could nominate but could not be nominated.
- ^5 As a new housemate Alessandra could nominate but could not be nominated.
- ^6 Tina could not be nominated this week because she survived last week's eviction.
- ^7 Elita could not be nominated this week as she received the fewest votes in last week's eviction.
- ^8 Team Sweden won the competition, meaning Norway must nominate this week.
- ^9 Anders, Britt, Denis, Elita, Hannah and Kristian won immunity in a competition. Everyone else had to nominate and could be nominated.
- ^10 Carl, Laila, Patrick, Klas and Tina won immunity in a competition. Everyone else had to nominate and could be nominated.
- ^11 This week the public nominated two housemates and the housemate would vote to evict.
- ^12 This week the public were voting for a housemate they wanted to see return to the big brother house, they chose between Sebastian, Therese, and Tina. As Tina received 76% of the vote she returned to the house.
- ^13 This week all housemates were up for eviction and the public were voting for who they wanted to save, the two housemates to receive the fewest save votes would be evicted.
- ^14 This week the two teams merged.
- ^15 Annicka, Jenny, and Madeleine all entered the house as new housemates. The housemates had to vote to keep the one housemate they wanted to keep. Since Annicka got the most votes(4) she got to stay in the house.
- ^16 As a new housemate Annicka could nominate but could not be nominated.
- ^17 The housemates evicted this week will not really be evicted but will be moved to a secret room inside the house and next week one of them will be evicted.
- ^18 This week the public were voting for which housemate they wanted to keep out of the hidden room.
- ^19 Carl was immune from eviction because he returned from the secret room.
- ^20 Elita was nominated by Big brother for rule breaking.
- ^21 This week the public were voting for their favorite housemates, the three who received the fewest votes would be evicted, the two with the lowest votes on day 107 and the person with the third lowest total on day 110.
- ^22 This week the public were voting for the housemate they wanted to win.

== Second joint season ==
The second season ditched the team format of the first season and went back to the original format of the show. The first twist of the season was announced on launch night, the twist was that by weeks end six of the twelve original male housemates would be evicted and it was up to the female housemates to decide which six would go. What the housemates didn't know was that the six would not be evicted but would be moved to a room next door to the house and that the person who stayed in the room the longest would return to the house. The rules to the last part of the twist was soon changed as on day 30 Daniel O, Max, and Per had yet to leave the room, a competition was held to determine who would return to the house. Unlike the first season when there were never any housemates nominated by Big brother, there were several housemates who were nominated by Big brother due to violence, rule breaking, discussing nominations, and several unknown reasons. In the end it was Jessica from Sweden who won 1,000,000 SEK with 44% of the vote.

Broadcasting: Kanal 5 19:00-20:00 (Monday-Friday); FEM 20:00-21:00 (Monday-Friday); Liveshows 21:00-22:30 (Sunday)

=== Housemates ===
| Name | Age on entry | Hometown | Entered | Exited | Result |
|---|---|---|---|---|---|
| Jessica Lindgren | 21 | Kalmar, Sweden | Day 1 | Day 115 | Winner |
| Richard Olsen | 26 | Kongsvinger, Norway | Day 1 | Day 115 | Runner-up |
| Anton Granlund | 23 | Stockholm, Sweden | Day 1 | Day 115 | 3rd Place |
| Daniel "Danne" Olsson | 26 | Gävle, Sweden | Day 1 Day 5 | Day 30; Day 115 | 4th Place |
| Linn Høyem | 25 | Oslo, Norway | Day 1 | Day 113 | Evicted |
| Anna Blombäck | 28 | Älvsbyn, Sweden | Day 59 | Day 111 | Evicted |
| Carina Dahl | 20 | Trondheim, Norway | Day 1 | Day 107 | Evicted |
| Robin Persson | 21 | Stockholm, Sweden | Day 59 | Day 100 | Evicted |
| Thommy Berglund | 25 | Gothenburg, Sweden | Day 59 | Day 93 | Evicted |
| Samuel Aronsson | 25 | Östersund, Sweden | Day 1 | Day 86 | Evicted |
| Irene Halle | 23 | Stjørdal, Norway | Day 59 | Day 79 | Evicted |
| Gabriela Morales | 22 | Gothenburg, Sweden | Day 24 | Day 72 | Evicted |
| Therese Olander | 23 | Bærum, Norway | Day 1 | Day 65 | Evicted |
| Tatiana Karas | 30 | Malmö, Sweden | Day 53 | Day 60 | Walked |
| Daniel Wadlert | 27 | Gothenburg, Sweden | Day 24 | Day 58 | Evicted |
| Sami Alen | 26 | Kristiansand, Norway | Day 24 | Day 51 | Evicted |
| Malin Halvarsson | 26 | Stockholm, Sweden | Day 1 | Day 51 | Walked |
| Muffe Bajraktarevic | 25 | Norrköping, Sweden | Day 1 | Day 42 | Evicted |
| Wenche Helle | 21 | Lyngdal, Norway | Day 24 | Day 37 | Evicted |
| Angelica Bremert | 21 | Gothenburg, Sweden | Day 1 | Day 30 | Evicted |
| Kristian Hilberg | 22 | Oslo, Norway | Day 1 | Day 23 | Evicted |
| Morten Hegseth | 20 | Stjørdal, Norway | Day 1 | Day 16 | Evicted |
| Johan Krogh Halvorsen | 22 | Drammen, Norway | Day 1 | Day 9 | Evicted |
| Per Holmqvist | 23 | Borås, Sweden | Day 1 Day 4 | Day 4 Day 30 | Evicted |
| Roger Danielsen | 26 | Trondheim, Norway | Day 1 | Day 3 | Walked |
| Manne Lundin | 27 | Kalmar, Sweden | Day 1 | Day 3 | Evicted |
| Max Rudberg | 24 | Skotterud, Norway | Day 1 Day 2 | Day 2 Day 30 | Evicted |

=== Nominations table ===
| | Week 1 | | | | | Week 2 | Week 3 | Week 4 | Week 5 | Week 6 | Week 7 | Week 8 | Week 9 | Week 10 | Week 11 | Week 12 | Week 13 | Week 14 | Week 15 | Week 16 | |
| | Day 2 | Day 3 | Day 4 | Day 5 | Day 7 | Week 2 | Week 3 | Week 4 | Week 5 | Week 6 | Week 7 | Week 8 | Week 9 | Week 10 | Week 11 | Week 12 | Week 13 | Week 14 | Week 15 | Week 16 | |
|---|---|---|---|---|---|---|---|---|---|---|---|---|---|---|---|---|---|---|---|---|---|
| Jessica | No nominations | No nominations | No nominations | No nominations | Johan, Samuel | Linn, Angelica | Angelica, Anton | Angelica, Anton | Gabriela, Wenche | Nominated | Richard, Malin | Gabriela, Daniel | Carina, Therese | Gabriela, Thommy | Carina, Linn | No nominations | Carina, Thommy | Anton, Linn | No nominations | Winner (Day 115) | |
| Richard | No nominations | No nominations | No nominations | No nominations | Not eligible | Morten, Kristian | Kristian, Angelica | Angelica, Malin | Daniel, Wenche | Anton, Malin | Samuel, Linn | Gabriela, Anton | Anton, Jessica | Thommy, Irene | Irene, Thommy | No nominations | Anton, Jessica | Jessica, Anna | No nominations | Runner-up (Day 115) | |
| Anton | No nominations | No nominations | No nominations | No nominations | Not eligible | Linn, Morten | Linn, Therese | Linn, Malin | Wenche, Jessica | Gabriela, Daniel | Sami, Carina | Gabriela, Daniel | Jessica, Samuel | Exempt | Thommy, Linn | No nominations | Anna, Jessica | Robin, Anna | No nominations | Third place (Day 115) | |
| Danne | No nominations | No nominations | No nominations | No nominations | In Zone; Room | | | | Therese, Anton | Gabriela, Muffe | Carina, Samuel | Gabriela, Anton | Therese, Linn | Gabriela, Robin | Thommy, Irene | Exempt | Thommy, Anton | Anna, Robin | No nominations | Fourth place (Day 115) | |
| Linn | No nominations | No nominations | No nominations | No nominations | Anton, Muffe | Angelica, Kristian | Angelica, Kristian | Angelica, Samuel | Samuel, Wenche | Muffe, Daniel | Therese, Carina | Gabriela, Samuel | Jessica, Samuel | Jessica, Robin | Anna, Jessica | No nominations | Jessica, Thommy | Jessica, Robin | No nominations | Evicted (Day 113) | |
| Anna | Not in House | | | | | | | | | | | | Exempt | Thommy, Gabriela | Thommy, Linn | No nominations | Thommy, Robin | Robin, Danne | No nominations | Evicted (Day 111) | |
| Carina | No nominations | No nominations | No nominations | No nominations | Johan, Samuel | Linn, Malin | Jessica, Anton | Jessica, Muffe | Jessica, Anton | Muffe, Gabriela | Linn, Richard | Samuel, Gabriela | Jessica, Samuel | Anna, Jessica | Jessica, Robin | No nominations | Jessica, Robin | Nominated | No nominations | Evicted (Day 107) | |
| Robin | Not in House | | | | | | | | | | | | Exempt | Thommy, Gabriela | Thommy, Irene | No nominations | Thommy, Anna | Linn, Anna | Evicted (Day 100) | | |
| Thommy | Not in House | | | | | | | | | | | | Exempt | Irene, Robin | Irene, Anna | No nominations | Anna, Jessica | Evicted (Day 93) | | | |
| Samuel | No nominations | No nominations | No nominations | No nominations | Not eligible | Morten, Therese | Carina, Angelica | Angelica, Carina | Daniel, Wenche | Carina, Linn | Gabriela, Daniel | Linn, Therese | Therese, Linn | Robin, Anna | Linn, Thommy | No nominations | Evicted (Day 86) | | | | |
| Irene | Not in House | | | | | | | | | | | | Exempt | Thommy, Gabriela | Thommy, Anna | Evicted (Day 79) | | | | | |
| Gabriela | Not in House | | | | | | | Exempt | Jessica, Linn | Anton, Linn | Malin, Therese | Richard, Carina | Jessica, Richard | Jessica, Robin | Evicted (Day 72) | | | | | | |
| Therese | No nominations | No nominations | No nominations | No nominations | Samuel, Kristian | Kristian, Samuel | Kristian, Anton | Angelica, Jessica | Daniel, Wenche | Muffe, Daniel | Linn, Anton | Gabriela, Daniel | Jessica, Samuel | Evicted (Day 65) | | | | | | | |
| Tatiana | Not in House | | | | | | | | | | | Exempt | | Walked (Day 60) | | | | | | | |
| Daniel | Not in House | | | | | | | Exempt | Wenche, Anton | Muffe, Daniel | Linn, Anton | Gabriela, Anton | Evicted (Day 58) | | | | | | | | |
| Sami | Not in House | | | | | | | Exempt | Wenche, Linn | Daniel, Samuel | Anton, Therese | Evicted (Day 51) | | | | | | | | | |
| Malin | No nominations | No nominations | No nominations | No nominations | Johan, Kristian | Kristian, Therese | Kristian, Angelica | Anton, Muffe | Daniel, Wenche | Muffe, Daniel | Sami, Anton | Walked (Day 51) | | | | | | | | | |
| Muffe | No nominations | No nominations | No nominations | No nominations | Not eligible | Morten, Linn | Angelica, Anton | Linn, Therese | Wenche, Daniel | Daniel, Linn | Evicted (Day 42) | | | | | | | | | | |
| Wenche | Not in House | | | | | | | Exempt | Daniel, Jessica | Evicted (Day 37) | | | | | | | | | | | |
| Angelica | No nominations | No nominations | No nominations | No nominations | Johan, Samuel | Therese, Linn | Linn, Malin | Linn, Richard | Evicted (Day 30) | | | | | | | | | | | | |
| Per | No nominations | No nominations | No nominations | In Zone; Room | | | | | Evicted (Day 30) | | | | | | | | | | | | |
| Max | No nominations | In Zone; Room | | | | | | | Evicted (Day 30) | | | | | | | | | | | | |
| Kristian | No nominations | No nominations | No nominations | No nominations | Not eligible | Therese, Malin | Linn, Malin | Evicted (Day 23) | | | | | | | | | | | | | |
| Morten | No nominations | No nominations | No nominations | No nominations | Not eligible | Samuel, Linn | Evicted (Day 16) | | | | | | | | | | | | | | |
| Johan | No nominations | No nominations | No nominations | No nominations | Not eligible | Evicted (Day 9) | | | | | | | | | | | | | | | |
| Manne | No nominations | No nominations | Evicted (Day 3) | | | | | | | | | | | | | | | | | | |
| Roger | Not eligible | Walked (Day 3) | | | | | | | | | | | | | | | | | | | |
| Nominated | none | | | | Johan, Samuel | Jessica, Linn, Morten | Angelica, Kristian, Linn | Angelica, Anton, Jessica, Linn | Daniel, Jessica, Wenche | Daniel, Jessica, Muffe | Anton, Daniel, Danne, Gabriela, Sami | Daniel, Gabriela, Richard, Samuel | Jessica, Samuel, Therese | Gabriela, Robin, Thommy | Anna, Irene, Linn, Thommy | Anna, Anton, Carina, Jessica, Linn, Richard, Robin, Samuel, Thommy | Anna, Jessica, Thommy | Anna, Carina, Robin | Anna, Anton, Carina, Danne, Jessica, Linn, Richard | Anna, Anton, Danne, Jessica, Linn, Richard | |
| Walked | none | Roger | none | | | | | | | | Malin | none | Tatiana | none | | | | | | | |
| Evicted | Max; Female housemates' choice to evict | Manne; Female housemates' choice to evict | Per; Female housemates' choice to evict | Danne; Female housemates' choice to evict | Johan; 72% to evict | Morten; 48% to evict | Kristian; 46% to evict | Angelica; 39% to evict | Wenche; 59% to evict | Muffe; 59% to evict | Sami; 33% to evict | Daniel; 38% to evict | Therese; 61% to evict | Gabriela; 92% to evict | Irene; 30% to evict | Samuel; 3.47% to save | Thommy; 71% to evict | Robin; 36% to evict | Carina; 41% to evict | Anna; Fewest votes (out of 6) | Linn; Fewest votes (out of 5) |
| Evicted | Max; Female housemates' choice to evict | Manne; Female housemates' choice to evict | Per; Female housemates' choice to evict | Danne; Female housemates' choice to evict | Johan; 72% to evict | Morten; 48% to evict | Kristian; 46% to evict | Angelica; 39% to evict | Wenche; 59% to evict | Muffe; 59% to evict | Sami; 33% to evict | Daniel; 38% to evict | Therese; 61% to evict | Gabriela; 92% to evict | Irene; 30% to evict | Samuel; 3.47% to save | Thommy; 71% to evict | Robin; 36% to evict | Carina; 41% to evict | Danne; Fewest votes (out of 4) | Anton; Fewest votes (out of 3) |
| Evicted | Max; Female housemates' choice to evict | Manne; Female housemates' choice to evict | Per; Female housemates' choice to evict | Danne; Female housemates' choice to evict | Johan; 72% to evict | Morten; 48% to evict | Kristian; 46% to evict | Angelica; 39% to evict | Wenche; 59% to evict | Muffe; 59% to evict | Sami; 33% to evict | Daniel; 38% to evict | Therese; 61% to evict | Gabriela; 92% to evict | Irene; 30% to evict | Samuel; 3.47% to save | Thommy; 71% to evict | Robin; 36% to evict | Carina; 41% to evict | Richard; Fewest votes (out of 2) | Jessica; Most votes to win |

== Third joint season ==
Season 3 of the joint Big Brother between Sweden and Norway premiered on 31 August 2014. It was broadcast on Kanal 9 in Sweden and FEM in Norway. Hosts were Adam Alsing and Pia Lykke.

== See also ==
- Aylar Lie
