= Hylands hörna =

Swedish TV talk show

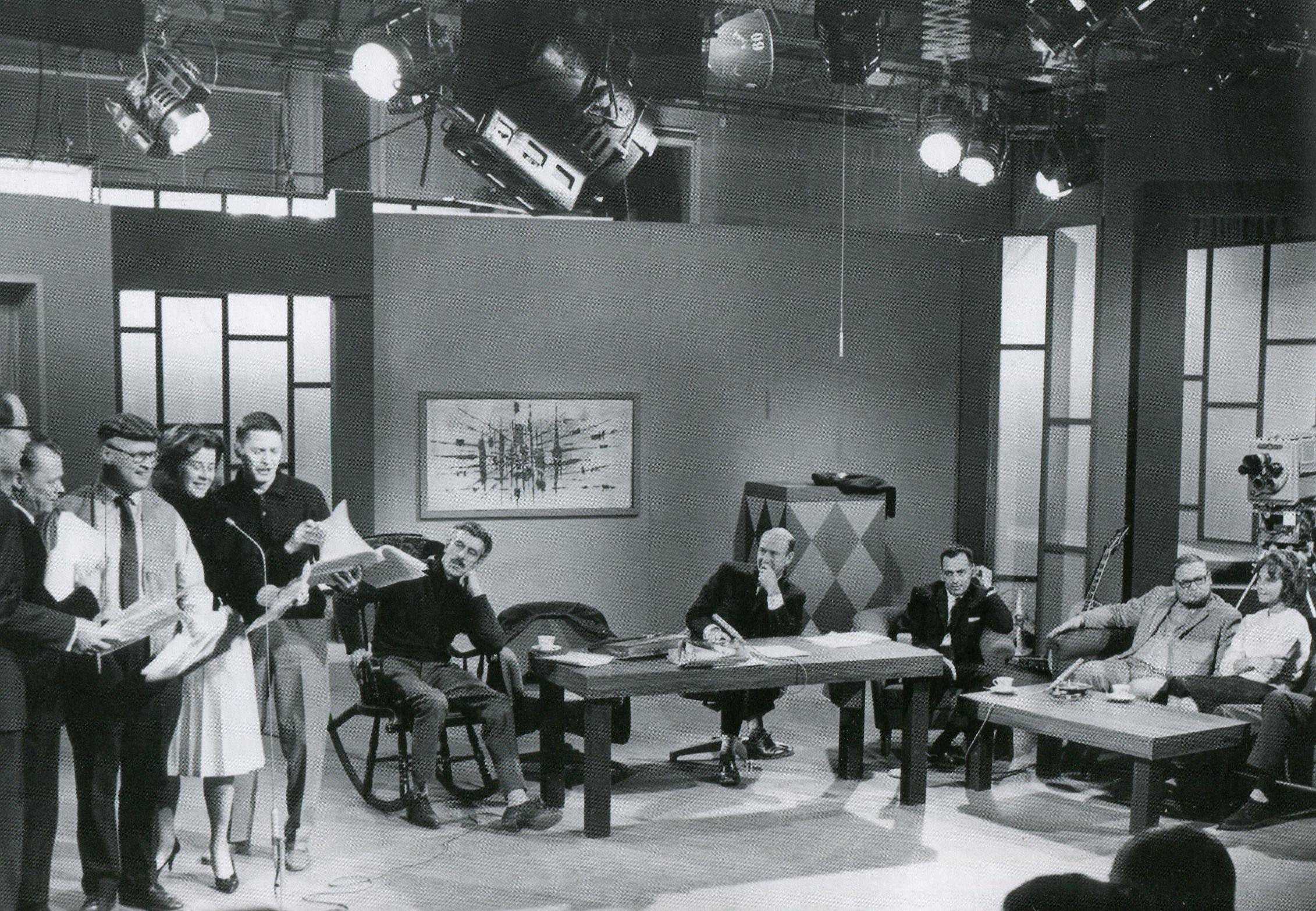
- The set of Hylands hörna as pictured in November 1962
- Presented by: Lennart Hyland
- Country of origin: Sweden
- Original language: Swedish

Production
- Producer: Allan Schulman
- Running time: 90 minutes

Original release
- Network: Sveriges Television
- Release: 3 October 1962 – 30 April 1983

Hylands hörna ("Hyland's corner") was a Swedish talk show presented by Lennart Hyland. Broadcast between 1962 and 1983, it was the first talk show in Sweden.

The show started as a radio program on 10 October 1961. It moved to television in 1962 and is, in percentage, one of the most watched programs in Sweden ever.

== Gallery ==
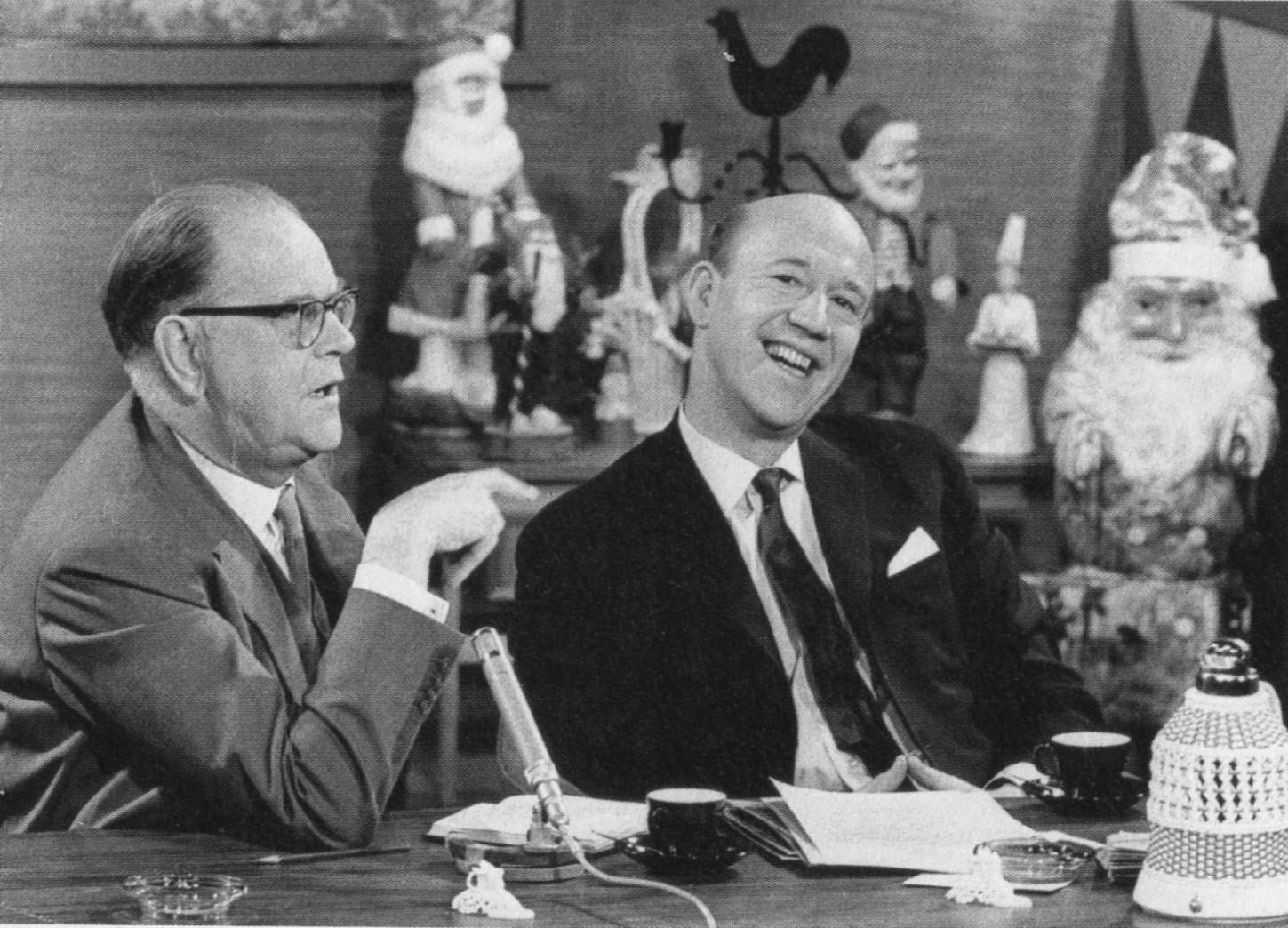
Prime Minister Tage Erlander (left) and Lennart Hyland in 1962.

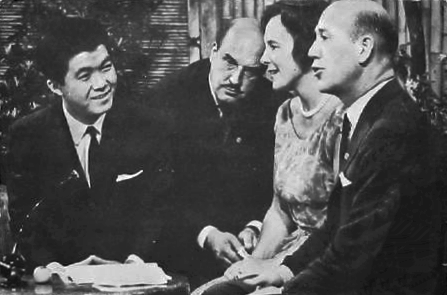
Japanese singer Kyu Sakamoto (far left) being interviewed on Hylands hörna on 10 October 1964 in a live broadcast from Tokyo.

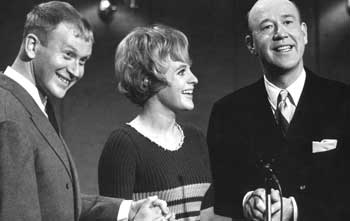
Thore Skogman, Eva Bysing and Lennart Hyland in 1966.

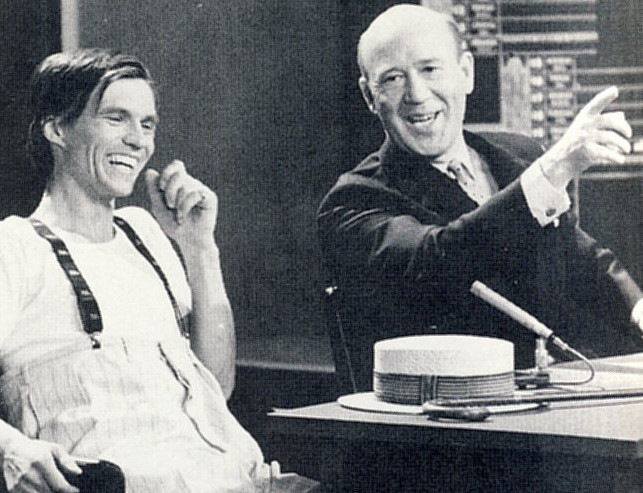
Per Oscarsson (left) and Lennart Hyland in 1966.
