= Television in Sweden =

Television began in Sweden in 1954 with test transmissions, prior to the opening of the first station, Radiotjänst, two years later. A second channel was launched in 1969. Commercial television arrived in the 1980s through cable television and in 1992, the country's first terrestrial commercial channel was launched.

Typically, non-Swedish content maintains the original language soundtrack while subtitled into Swedish. This includes foreign interviews embedded into news and magazine programmes as well as SVT's Finnish news bulletin (Uutiset). Conversely, interview responses given in Swedish aired on Finnish or Sami news bulletins are subtitled into the main language of that respective bulletin. Non-Swedish programming intended for children is, however, usually dubbed into Swedish. Regardless of the intended audience, some shows receive a Swedish title, which is used in programme schedules.

Many of the channels targeting Sweden are not actually broadcasting from Sweden, but from other countries (mostly from the United Kingdom). This is done to avoid the Swedish Broadcasting Law which restricts advertising heavily.

In addition to the channels listed below, viewers close to the border with Norway, Denmark or Finland can receive channels from those respective countries as a result of signal spillover and some satellite subscription packages offer some channels from these countries.

== History ==
The first television trials took place in February 1935, when a Stockholm radio manufacturer put up a transmitter and started broadcasting films.

The first trial television broadcasts in Sweden were launched on October 29, 1954, from the Royal Institute of Technology in Stockholm. Prior to this, some Swedes could watch television originating in other countries, notably Denmark, where thrice-weekly television broadcasts had begun in 1951.

The official launch of television in Sweden took place on September 4, 1956 when the Radiotjänst Television service was launched on the high power Nacka transmitter. The service was funded by a license fee with no advertising and was operated by Radiotjänst, which was also in charge of the nation's two radio networks. Daily broadcasts started in 1957 and Radiotjänst was renamed as Sveriges Radio. The first television news programme in Sweden, Aktuellt, was broadcast on 2 September 1958 and continues to this day on SVT2.

A second channel was discussed throughout the 1960s. It was eventually decided that a second channel would launch and that it would have the same business model as the first channel. TV2, as the new channel was called, launched on 5 December 1969 and the first channel was subsequently renamed TV1. Both channels were operated by Sverige Radio and funded by licence fees.

Colour broadcasts had started in the 1960s, but launched officially in April 1970. Trial broadcasts for regional television began in 1970 with regional news programmes in Scania. Further regional news services were introduced with the Stockholm capital region the last to receive its own such service in 1987. Sveriges Radio was reorganised and split into several new companies in 1979, one of which, Sveriges Television, now held total responsibility for television broadcasting.

Cable television started becoming common in the 1980s. At this time, the cable companies also started relaying international satellite channels. The first Swedish-language satellite channel was TV3 which started in December 1987. Two other early satellite channels were Nordic Channel (later known as Kanal 5), which started in 1989 and TV4, which was launched in 1990. The arrival of commercial satellite channels fueled a debate on allowing advertising on terrestrial services. Eventually, it was decided that a commercial channel would be allowed to broadcast terrestrially. TV4 won the rights to broadcast terrestrially during the autumn of 1991 and subsequently launched in March 1992.

Other cable channels available to receive in Sweden at the time included FilmNet (1985), TV1000 (1989), ZTV (1991), TV21 (1993), TV6 (1994), TV8 (1997) and Viasat Sport (1999).

Sweden was one of the first countries in the world to launch digital terrestrial television in April 1999. The arrival of digital television in the country has caused the number of television channels to multiply. The first high-definition television channel targeting the Nordic countries was C More HD, which launched in 2005. SVT and TV4 made their first high-definition broadcasts in 2006. The shutdown of the PAL analogue service in Sweden started on September 19, 2005, and was finished on October 15, 2007.

Boxer quit the digital terrestrial platform on 2 January 2025, leaving only the free-to-air channels: the SVT channels and the main TV4 channel. Later, on 12 January 2026, TV4 shut down its terrestrial broadcasts after over thirty years.

== Media companies ==
Four media companies dominate the Swedish television market:

- Sveriges Television, which owns SVT1, SVT2, SVT24, SVT Barn and Kunskapskanalen
- Viaplay Group, which owns TV3, TV6, TV8, TV10, the V Sport package, the V Film package and some documentary channels.
- TV4 AB, which owns TV4, Sjuan, TV12, TV4 Fakta, TV4 Film, TV4 Guld and the TV4 Play+ package.
- Warner Bros. Discovery, which owns Kanal 5, Kanal 9, Kanal 11, the Swedish versions of Eurosport 1 and Eurosport 2 and the Discovery and Warner bros. channels.

Viewing shares in 2014.

== Viewing share ==
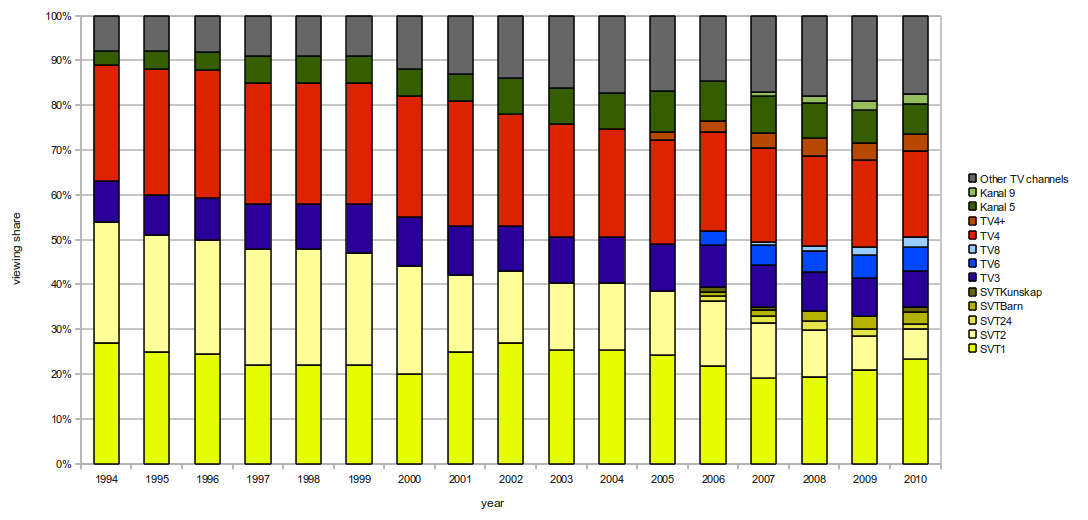
Viewing shares in Sweden 1994-2010

The five largest channels by ratings have been SVT1, SVT2, TV3, TV4 and Kanal 5 since the 1990s, with SVT1 and TV4 attracting the largest audiences. In 2006, the most watched non-"big 5" channels were TV4 Plus, TV6, Eurosport, Discovery Channel and MTV. There were never more than three national channels in the analogue terrestrial network: SVT1 (from 1956), SVT2 (from 1969) and TV4 (from 1992).

Swedish television channels listed by their viewing share 1998-2011. Source: MMS.

	1998	1999	2000	2001	2002	2003	2004	2005	2006	2007	2008	2009	2010	2011	2012	2013	2014	2015	2016	2017	2018
SVT1	22	22	20	27	27	25	25	24.2	21.8	19.0	19.2	21.0	23.2	22.9	24.3	23.3	22.4	24.3	24.7	25.6	24.5
SVT2	26	25	24	17	16	15	15	14.3	14.5	12.5	10.5	7.5	6.9	6.7	6.7	6.9	7.2	6.9	6.8	6.9	6.3
TV3	10	11	11	11	10	10	10	10.5	9.4	9.3	8.8	8.4	8.1	7.2	6.4	6.2	7.2	5.0	5.7	3.8	4.4
TV4	27	27	27	28	25	25	24	23.2	22.2	21.2	20.1	19.4	19.2	19.6	18.9	20.1	20.0	20.2	20.5	21.5	23.6
Kanal 5	6	6	6	6	8	8	8	9.2	8.8	8.2	8.0	7.2	6.8	6.5	6.1	5.9	5.4	5.2	4.4	4.4	6.1
ZTV/TV6	0.7	1.3	1.6	1.4	1.4	1.5	1.8	2.3	3.2	4.5	4.7	5.2	5.2	4.8	4.1	4.4	4.1	3.8	3.5	3.0	2.7
Eurosport (1)	1.6	1.5	1.7	1.6	1.4	1.7	1.9	1.6	1.6	1.4	0.9	0.9	0.6	0.6	0.6	0.5	0.4	0.5	0.4	0.6	0.5
MTV	0.8	0.8	0.7	0.7	0.9	0.7	0.8	0.9	1.1	1.1	1.2	0.9	0.8	0.5	0.4	0.4	0.4	0.3	0.2	0.3	0.2
Discovery	0.3	0.2	0.4	0.5	0.8	0.9	1.3	1.9	1.7	1.9	1.7	1.8	1.2	1.2	1.3	1.4	1.2	1.0	1.2	1.3	1.0
TV6/Viasat Nature/Action/Crime	0.9	0.5	0.5	0.5	0.5	0.3	0.4	0.3	0.3	0.4	0.4	0.3	0.2	0.2	0.2	0.2	0.1	0.1	0.1	0.1	0.1
Cartoon Network	0.3	0.5	0.5	0.4	0.5	0.7	0.3	0.6	0.6	0.5	0.5	0.4	0.5	0.5	0.5	0.4	0.5	0.5	0.5	0.5	0.4
Canal+	0.2	0.3	0.2	0.3	0.7	0.7	0.7	0.4	0.2												
TV8		0.0	0.1	0.1	0.1	0.1	0.1	0.1	0.3	0.6	1.0	1.8	2.4	2.8	3.3	3.1	3.0	3.0	3.2	3.1	3.0
Animal Planet			0.0	0.1	0.1	0.3	0.4	0.4	0.6	0.6	0.6	0.6	0.6	0.4	0.4	0.3	0.3	0.3	0.2	0.3	0.3
National Geographic			0.0	0.1	0.1	0.1	0.1	0.1	0.1	0.2	0.2	0.2	0.2	0.3	0.2	0.2	0.4	0.4	0.5	0.4	0.5
Nickelodeon				0.0	0.3	0.3	0.3	0.4	0.8	0.6	0.9	0.9	0.9	0.7	0.7	0.6	0.5	0.4	0.4	0.5	0.4
SVT24					0.1	0.3	0.3	0.5	1.0	1.4	1.9	1.5	1.0	0.8	0.7	0.6	0.6	0.4	0.4	0.4	0.4
TV4 Plus/Sjuan						0.6	1.3	1.8	2.4	3.3	3.9	4.0	3.7	4.0	4.3	4.5	4.6	4.6	4.1	4.0	4.0
Discovery Mix						0.8	0.8	0.3	0.3	0.2											
Disney Channel						0.4	0.6	0.8	1.0	1.3	1.3	1.0	0.8	0.8	0.8	0.9	0.9	0.6	0.5	0.3	0.2
TV400/TV11/Kanal 11						0.0	0.0	0.2	0.4	0.6	0.6	0.6	0.5	1.1	1.1	0.5	1.0	1.1	1.0	0.9	1.0
TLC						0.0	0.0	0.0	0.0	0.1	0.1	0.1	0.1	0.4	0.3	0.4	0.5	0.7	0.8	0.7	0.7
SVTB							0.3	0.4	0.7	1.5	2.3	3.0	2.8	3.4	3.8	3.5	3.4	3.4	3.1	3.0	2.6
TV4 Sport/Sportkanalen/TV4 Sportkanalen								0.0	0.1	0.3	1.1	1.4	1.3	1.4	1.4	1.5	0.5	0.1	0.1	0.0	0.2
TV4 Film								0.3	0.5	0.8	0.9	0.9	0.8	0.7	0.7	0.7	0.7	0.6	0.5	0.5	0.5
TV4 Fakta								0.1	0.4	0.7	0.7	1.1	1.2	1.1	0.9	1.0	0.9	1.1	1.0	0.9	0.6
Kunskapskanalen								0.1	0.3	0.4			1.0	0.9	1.0	0.9	1.0	1.0	1.0	1.1	1.1
Disney Junior									0.0	0.2	0.2	0.4	0.4	0.4	0.4	0.4	0.4	0.4	0.4	0.3	0.2
Kanal 9										0.9	1.6	2.0	2.2	2.2	2.1	2.0	2.0	2.1	1.7	1.9	2.0
TV4 Guld										0.2	0.3	0.4	0.4	0.5	0.4	0.6	0.7	0.9	1.1	0.9	0.5
TV10													0.3	0.8	0.9	1.0	1.3	1.3	1.6	1.4	1.5
Disney XD													0.4	0.3	0.5	0.4	0.4	0.3	0.2	0.2	0.1
TV12																	1.6	1.8	2.2	2.7	2.5
Fox																	0.7	0.9	0.6	0.7	0.5
Investigation Discovery																		0.5	0.5	0.4	0.4

== See also ==
- List of television stations in Sweden
