= List of television stations in Denmark =

This is a list of television stations in Denmark.

== DR (Danish Broadcasting Corporation) ==
- DR1
- DR2
- DR Ramasjang

Discontinued:

- DR HD
- DR Update
- DR3
- DR K
- DR Ultra

== TV 2 Danmark ==
National:

- TV 2
- TV 2 Echo
- TV 2 Charlie
- TV 2 News
- TV 2 Fri
- TV 2 Sport
- TV 2 Sport X

Regional:

- TV 2/Bornholm
- TV 2/Fyn
- TV 2/Lorry
- TV/Midt-Vest
- TV 2/Nord
- TV Syd
- TV 2 Øst
- TV 2/Østjylland

Discontinued:

- TV 2 Film
- TV 2 Zulu

== Viaplay Group ==
TV3 brand

- TV3
- TV3+
- TV3 Puls
- TV3 Sport
- TV3 MAX
- See

V brand

- V Classics
- V Crime
- V Film Premiere
- V Film Action
- V Film Family
- V Film Hits
- V Series
- V Sport Golf
- V Sport Live
- V Sport Ultra

Viaplay brand

- Viaplay Sport 1
- Viaplay Sport 2
- Viaplay Sport 3
- Viaplay Sport News
- Viaplay Xtra

Discontinued:

- Sportkanalen
- TV6
- Viasat Film
- Viasat Film Classic
- Viasat Film Comedy
- Viasat Film Drama
- Viasat Film Nordic
- TV3 Sport 2

== Skydance ==
- MTV
- Nickelodeon
- Nick Jr.
- Nicktoons
- Kanal 4
- Kanal 5
- 6'eren
- Canal 9
- Discovery Channel Denmark
- TLC Denmark
- Eurosport 1
- Eurosport 2
- Investigation Discovery
- Animal Planet
- Discovery Science
- Travel Channel
- Cartoon Network
- Cartoonito
- CNN International

Discontinued:

- Comedy Central
- Paramount Network
- Paramount+ Movies
- Paramount+ Series
- VH1 Denmark
- VH1 Classic
- Club MTV
- MTV Hits
- MTV Live
- MTV 80s
- MTV 90s
- MTV 00s
- NickMusic
- 7'eren
- Discovery World
- Discovery Travel & Living
- TNT
- Star!
- Showtime
- Silver
- TCM
- Boomerang

== Comcast/Skydance ==
- SkyShowtime 1
- SkyShowtime 2

== TV4 Media ==
- Hits
- SF-kanalen
- Stars

Discontinued:

- Kiosk
- SuperSport
- C More Action
- C More Emotion
- C More Extreme
- C More Film
- C More First
- C More Golf
- C More Kids
- C More Hockey
- C More Series
- C More Tennis

== The Walt Disney Company ==
=== Disney ===
- Disney Channel

Discontinued:

- Disney Junior
- Disney XD

=== National Geographic ===
- National Geographic
- National Geographic Wild

Discontinued:

- Nat Geo People

=== Fox Networks Group ===
Discontinued:

- Xee

== BBC Studios ==
- BBC News
- BBC Nordic

Discontinued:

- BBC Brit
- BBC Earth
- BBC Entertainment
- BBC Lifestyle

== Other channels ==
- DK4 (Tritel)
- Al Jazeera (Al Jazeera Media Network)
- Bloomberg (Bloomberg L.P.)
- DW-TV (Deutsche Welle)
- Dizi (SPI International)
- Euronews (Euronews SA)
- FashionTV (FashionTV SA)
- France 24 (France Médias Monde)
- History (A+E Networks)
- H2 (A&E Networks)
- Horse & Country TV
- Love Nature (Blue Ant Media)
- Mezzo (Groupe Les Échos-Le Parisien (50%) and Groupe Canal+ (50%))
- Mezzo Live HD (Groupe Les Échos-Le Parisien (50%) and Groupe Canal+ (50%))
- Moonbug (Moonbug Entertainment)
- Viasat Explore (Viasat World Limited)
- Viasat Nature (Viasat World Limited)
- Viasat History (Viasat World Limited)
- E! (NBC Universal Global Networks España S.L.U.)
- CNBC Europe (Versant)
- Sport Live
- Sky News (Comcast)
- Tegnsprogskanalen (DR & TV 2 Danmark)
- TV Glad

== Regional/local channels ==
- 24Nordjyske
- 24Sjællandske
- Aabenraa Lokal TV
- Aalborg+ (former AN-TV)
- Kanal København
- KTV Kolding

== Providers ==
Digital Terrestrial:

- Boxer TV A/S

Satellite:

- Allente

Cable:

- YouSee
- Stofa
- Waoo!

== See also ==
- Television in Denmark
- Digital terrestrial television in Denmark
