= Boxer TV =

Danish television broadcaster

Boxer TV A/S
- Company type: Private company limited by shares
- Industry: Media
- Headquarters: Copenhagen, Denmark
- Products: Television, digital terrestrial television
- Parent: Boxer TV Access
- Website: www.boxertv.dk

Boxer TV A/S is a company that has been broadcasting pay television channels on the digital terrestrial television network in Denmark since February 1, 2009. It is a subsidiary of Boxer TV Access, a Swedish company owned by Tele2.

== History ==
Boxer won the right to build four multiplex networks to broadcast digital television in 2008. They were competing against Danmarks Digital TV A/S (owned by Telenor) and Danmarks TV A/S (owned by Modern Times Group, MTG). The procurement was organized by the government agency Mediesekretariatet and in March 2008 Radio- og TV-nævnet chose Swedish Boxer as the gatekeeper out of the three applicants. As Telenor and MTG both owned satellite platforms in Denmark, and Boxer did not have any operations in Denmark, Boxer won the contract. Boxer stated in their application that they would use three of the networks to broadcast 29 pay television channels and the fourth network would be used to broadcast mobile television.

The initial plan was that Boxer would start broadcasting on November 1, 2009, when the analogue signals were shut down.

Boxer were however able to make a soft launch on Jutland and Western Funen on February 1, 2009. The launch package, which is called "Boxer Vest", consists of TV 2 Zulu, TV 2 News, TV 2 Film, TV 2 Charlie, Kanal 4, Kanal 5, 6'eren, Discovery Channel and Animal Planet.

Starting on May 1, 2009, Boxer made a soft launch in Copenhagen. This was made possible by using the Copenhagen transmitter on UHF channel 35 which was used to broadcast local channels such as Kanal København. Boxer broadcasts the same channels as in Jutland, but shares the frequency with Kanal København and the gaming channel G-TV.

In months leading up to the full launch, Boxer announced agreement with the channels that were added in November 2009, including Discovery Travel & Living, CNN and Cartoon Network in February, Disney Channel in April, Travel Channel in May, Disney XD, Discovery Science, MTV, VH1 and Nickelodeon in June, Canal 9 and Canal+ channels in July and TV 2 Sport in August. On August 17, Boxer revealed the full lineup. Other than the previously announced channels, it would include The Voice, History, Star!, Body In Balance, TV4 Sweden, TV2 Norway and Das Erste.

Notably absent from the lineup were the Viasat channels (including TV3, TV3+ and TV3 Puls), Eurosport, dk4, National Geographic Channel and SVT's channels.

On March 15, 2011 there was a channel change, and Body In Balance and Canal+ Sport 1 was cut from the package and replaced by DK4 which had been in great demand. Also Canal+ Hits Sport Weekend was replaced by just Canal+ Hits.

11 January 2012 there an additional another channel change took place, since the Danish TV 2 became a pay channel. today the channel is offered in all Boxer channel packets such as Boxer Mini, Boxer Mix, Boxer Max, Boxer Flex8 and the Boxer TV 2 package.

from April 2012, Boxer has offered HD channels. As of today Boxer offers seven HD channels such as TV2 HD, TV2 Film HD, TV2 Fri HD, TV3 HD, TV3 Sport HD, HD 5 and HD 6 as well as the existing DR HD channels, which are an integrated part of any Boxer package. Boxer has continued to adjust their range of channels and some channels have been added such as TV3 and TV3 Plus while others and less popular have been removed.

For more on the parent company, Boxer TV Access, see the article Boxer TV Access.

== Products ==
It is possible to choose between five channel packages at Boxer and supplement with any of the "tilvalgskanaler"

- Boxer Mini
- Boxer Mix
- Boxer Max
- Boxer TV2 Pakken
- Boxer Flex 8

Boxer are obligated to offer highly flexible packages. This means that, aside from the regular tiers Boxer Mini (7 channels), Boxer Mix (15 channels), Boxer Max (29 channels) and Boxer TV2 pakken (all of TV2's channels), similar to the ones offered by other operators, Boxer also offers Flex8, where the consumer can choose eight channels from a list of 27, as well as eight themed packages and several channels that can be bought à la carte.

Boxer offers the service "Boxer Bio", which is a film and TV-show streaming service which also allows the viewers to record the broadcasts. You need to have the Boxer Bio Box in order to receive the service.

== Channels ==
To the Basic packages (Mix, Max, Mini, Flex8) one can add from:

- Family
- Knowledge
- Children
- Lifestyle
- Men
- Music
- Sport
- CANAL+

The channels from which packages are built include:

- DR1
- DR2
- DR Update
- DR Ramasjang
- DR K
- DR HD
- TV 2 Regions
- Folketinget
- Local TV
- TV 2
- TV 2 News
- TV 2 Charlie
- TV 2 Zulu
- TV 2 Film
- Kanal 5
- Kanal 4
- 6'eren
- Canal 9
- DK4
- Discovery Channel
- Disney Channel
- MTV
- CNN
- TV 2 Sport
- Animal Planet
- Cartoon Network
- Nickelodeon
- Disney XD
- The Voice
- Vh1
- Discovery Science
- TLC
- History Channel
- Travel Channel
- Star!
- Canal+ First
- Canal+ Hits
- TV4 Sweden
- TV2 Norway
- ARD

A pre pay card "Tank Selv Kort" - when activating the card - offers TV2 Sport, and allows user wants to fill in name, address, e-mail, phone etc. (or remain anonymous).

The Copenhagen metropolitan area has a sixth offering called MUX-CPH, which is

- unconnected to Boxer and
- their four channels are broadcast free-to-air from one single transmitter in the north-west of Copenhagen;
- in the flat landscape receiving is possible up to a range of 30 to 40 km (possibly even longer) depending on the antenna and local surroundings.

The four Copenhagen metro channels are:

- Kanal København (Channel Copenhagen)
- Familie TV (Family TV, a Christian channel)
- Game TV
- France 24 (Worldwide news in English, from a French point of view.)
