= Danmarks Næste Topmodel season 4 =

Danmarks Næste Topmodel
- Season 4

Release
- Original network: Kanal 5
- Original release: September 19 – November 21, 2013

Season chronology
- ← Previous; Cycle 3 Next → Cycle 5

Danmarks Næste Topmodel, cycle 4 was the fourth cycle of Danmarks Næste Topmodel. Caroline Fleming, Uffe Buchard, Jesper Thomsen and Oliver Bjerrehuus all remained as judges on the show. Actor and TV-presenter Christian Schaumburg-Müller was added, as a new judge for panel. The show began to air on September 19, 2013.

Among with the prizes was a modeling contract with Unique Model Management and the cover spread in COVER magazine Denmark.

The winner was 20-year-old Louise Mørck Mikkelsen from Odense.

== Contestants ==
(ages stated are at start of contest)

Contestant	Age	Height	Hometown	Finish	Place
Klara Leonora Pascoe Lau	14	1.73 m (5 ft 8 in)	Odense	Episode 2	15
Sille Rieck	15	1.75 m (5 ft 9 in)	Odense	Episode 3	14–13
Petronelle Schultz	19	1.71 m (5 ft 7 1/2 in)	Nakskov	Episode 3	14–13
Rebecca Rovsing	17	1.73 m (5 ft 8 in)	Hvidovre	Episode 4	12
Andrea Linnéa Emilia Helander	24	1.71 m (5 ft 7 1/2 in)	Copenhagen	Episode 5	11
Mette Christensen	16	1.76 m (5 ft 9 1/2 in)	Espergærde	Episode 6	10–9
Amalie Egemose	15	1.79 m (5 ft 10 1/2 in)	Horsens	Episode 6	10–9
Anne Holth	17	1.82 m (5 ft 11 1/2 in)	Odense	Episode 7	8
Josephine Maria Bach Jacobsen	19	1.81 m (5 ft 11 1/2 in)	Greve	Episode 8	7
Caroline Sebber Colfelt	16	1.80 m (5 ft 11 in)	Aarhus	Episode 9	6–5
Amanda Elfving	19	1.74 m (5 ft 8 1/2 in)	Randers	Episode 9	6–5
Anne-Kathrine Petersen Bach	15	1.74 m (5 ft 8 1/2 in)	Aalborg	Episode 10	4
Catrine Juhl	15	1.77 m (5 ft 9 1/2 in)	Albertslund	Episode 10	3–2
Caroline Hollitsch	14	1.77 m (5 ft 9 1/2 in)	Aarhus	Episode 10	3–2
Louise Mørck Mikkelsen	20	1.78 m (5 ft 10 in)	Odense	Episode 10	1

== Episode summaries ==
=== Episode 1 ===
- First eliminated: Maria Erfurt Høj Holmgaard, Simone Skov Jensen & Zandra Strobel Brandi Hansen
- Photo of the week: Louise Mørck Mikkelsen
- Second eliminated: Alma Amila Rasmussen & Mathilde Almind Jensen

=== Episode 2 ===
- Photo of the week: Catrine Juhl
- Bottom two: Klara Lau & Sille Rieck
- Eliminated: Klara Lau

=== Episode 3 ===
- Challenge winners: Josephine Bach Jacobsen, Caroline Hollitsch & Catrine Juhl
- Photo of the week: Caroline Hollitsch
- Bottom two/eliminated: Petronelle Schultz & Sille Rieck

=== Episode 4 ===
- Challenge winners: Andrea Helander & Louise Mørck Mikkelsen
- Video of the week: Anne Holth
- Bottom two: Mette Christensen & Rebecca Rovsing
- Eliminated: Rebecca Rovsing

=== Episode 5 ===
- Challenge winner: Amanda Elfving
- Photo of the week: Caroline Hollitsch
- Bottom two: Amalie Egemose & Andrea Helander
- Eliminated: Andrea Helander

=== Episode 6 ===
- Challenge winner: Amanda Elfving
- Photo of the week: Caroline Hollitsch
- Bottom three: Amalie Egemose, Josephine Bach Jacobsen & Mette Christensen
- Eliminated: Amalie Egemose & Mette Christensen

=== Episode 7 ===
- Challenge winner: Anne Kathrine Petersen Bach
- Photo of the week: Catrine Juhl
- Bottom two: Anne Holth & Caroline Sebber Colfelt
- Eliminated: Anne Holth

=== Episode 8 ===
- Challenge winner: Caroline Sebber Colfelt
- Photo of the week: Caroline Sebber Colfelt
- Bottom two: Caroline Hollitsch & Josephine Bach Jacobsen
- Eliminated: Josephine Bach Jacobsen

=== Episode 9 ===
- Challenge winner: Louise Mørck Mikkelsen
- Photo of the week: Caroline Hollitsch
- Bottom two/eliminated: Amanda Elfving & Caroline Sebber Colfelt

=== Episode 10 ===
- Challenge winner: Catrine Juhl
- Eliminated outside of judging panel: Anne Kathrine Petersen Bach
- Final three: Caroline Hollitsch, Catrine Juhl & Louise Mørck Mikkelsen
- Denmark's Next Top Model: Louise Mørck Mikkelsen

== Summaries ==
=== Results table ===
Place	Model	Episodes									
Place	Model	1	2	3	4	5	6	7	8	9	10
1	Louise	WIN	SAFE	SAFE	SAFE	SAFE	SAFE	SAFE	SAFE	SAFE	Winner
2-3	Caroline H.	SAFE	SAFE	WIN	SAFE	WIN	WIN	SAFE	LOW	WIN	OUT
2-3	Catrine	SAFE	WIN	SAFE	SAFE	SAFE	SAFE	WIN	SAFE	SAFE	OUT
4	Anne Kathrine	SAFE	SAFE	SAFE	SAFE	SAFE	SAFE	SAFE	SAFE	SAFE	OUT
5-6	Amanda	SAFE	SAFE	SAFE	SAFE	SAFE	SAFE	SAFE	SAFE	OUT	
5-6	Caroline S.	SAFE	SAFE	SAFE	SAFE	SAFE	SAFE	LOW	WIN	OUT	
7	Josephine	SAFE	SAFE	SAFE	SAFE	SAFE	LOW	SAFE	OUT		
8	Anne	SAFE	SAFE	SAFE	WIN	SAFE	SAFE	OUT			
9-10	Amalie	SAFE	SAFE	SAFE	SAFE	LOW	OUT				
9-10	Mette	SAFE	SAFE	SAFE	LOW	SAFE	OUT				
11	Andrea	SAFE	SAFE	SAFE	SAFE	OUT					
12	Rebecca	SAFE	SAFE	SAFE	OUT						
13-14	Petronelle	SAFE	SAFE	OUT							
13-14	Sille	SAFE	LOW	OUT							
15	Klara	SAFE	OUT								

The contestant won photo of the week
The contestant was eliminated outside the judging panel
The contestant was in danger of elimination
The contestant was eliminated
The contestant won the competition

=== Photo shoot guide ===
- Episode 1 photo shoot: Promotional pictures in army outfits (casting)
- Episode 2 photo shoot: High end hipsters in Kødbyen
- Episode 3 photo shoot: TRESemmé hair campaign
- Episode 4 music video: Romance with Johnson
- Episode 5 photo shoot: Worldly women eating food
- Episode 6 photo shoot: Royal ballet with male dancers
- Episode 7 photo shoot: Sight-seeing in Paris
- Episode 8 photo shoot: Car washing babes
- Episode 9 photo shoot: Flower beauty shots
- Episode 10 photo shoot: Covers for COVER magazine
