= Danmarks Næste Topmodel season 6 =

Danmarks Næste Topmodel
- Season 6

Release
- Original network: Kanal 4
- Original release: September 2 – November 4, 2015

Season chronology
- ← Previous; Cycle 5

Danmarks Næste Topmodel, cycle 6 was the sixth cycle of Danmarks Næste Topmodel. After hosting five consecutive cycles, Caroline Fleming left her role for the season. She was replaced by Cecilie Lassen. This season the cast consisted of 13 contestants. It was the only cycle to feature male contestants. The season premiered on September 2, 2015. There was no international destination this cycle.

The winner was 16-year-old Daniel Kildevæld Madsen from Horsens.

== Prizes ==
- A contract with Unique Models.
- A cover and spread for COVER magazine
- A 2-year long contract for Beauté Pacifique

== Contestants ==
(ages stated are at start of contest)

| Contestant | Age | Height | Hometown | Finish | Place |
|---|---|---|---|---|---|
| Kamilla Sofie Spinola Sørensen | 17 | 1.79 m (5 ft 10 1/2 in) | Skive | Episode 2 | 13 |
| Gustav Pedersen | 18 | 1.83 m (6 ft 0 in) | Stenstrup | Episode 3 | 12 |
| Issa Sultan | 20 | 1.95 m (6 ft 5 in) | Lillerød | Episode 4 | 11–10 |
| Julia Just Holch | 17 | 1.75 m (5 ft 9 in) | Helsingør | Episode 4 | 11–10 |
| Simone Holme Pallesen | 22 | 1.72 m (5 ft 7 1/2 in) | Copenhagen | Episode 5 | 9 |
| Lukas Anker | 17 | 1.89 m (6 ft 2 1/2 in) | Fredericia | Episode 6 | 8 |
| Kenni Nielsen | 20 | 1.85 m (6 ft 1 in) | Esbjerg | Episode 7 | 7 |
| Helene Skovsgaard Hansen | 20 | 1.79 m (5 ft 10 1/2 in) | Odense | Episode 8 | 6 |
| Thomas Ian Kahle | 18 | 1.89 m (6 ft 2 1/2 in) | Hørsholm | Episode 9 | 5–4 |
| Thea Brandi | 16 | 1.75 m (5 ft 9 in) | Fjerritslev | Episode 9 | 5–4 |
| Mark Christiansen Appadoo | 20 | 1.85 m (6 ft 1 in) | Copenhagen | Episode 10 | 3 |
| Amalie 'Malle' Turpie | 16 | 1.81 m (5 ft 11 1/2 in) | Farum | Episode 10 | 2 |
| Daniel Kildevæld Madsen | 16 | 1.90 m (6 ft 3 in) | Østbirk | Episode 10 | 1 |

== Episode summaries ==
=== Episode 1 ===
Original Airdate: September 2, 2015

- First eliminated: Ejner Bjerrum & Anna Liebman
- Second eliminated: Malou Kirstine Jeppson, Kasper Stig Henriksen & Amalie Borre

=== Episode 2 ===
Original Airdate: September 9, 2015

- Photo of the week: Daniel Kildevæld Madsen
- Bottom two: Issa Sultan & Kamilla Spinola Sørensen
- Eliminated: Kamilla Spinola Sørensen

=== Episode 3 ===
Original Airdate: September 16, 2015

- Challenge winners: Malle Turpie & Simone Holme Pallesen
- Photo of the week: Malle Turpie
- First eliminated: Gustav Pedersen
- Bottom two: Kenni Nielsen & Lukas Anker
- Eliminated: None

=== Episode 4 ===
Original Airdate: September 23, 2015

Pairs
Daniel & Helene
Helene & Sultan
Julia & Thomas
Kenni & Malle
Lukas & Thea
Mark & Simone

- Photo of the week: Thomas Kahle
- First eliminated: Julia Just Holch
- Bottom two: Issa Sultan & Lukas Anker
- Eliminated: Issa Sultan

=== Episode 5 ===
Original Airdate: September 30, 2015

- Photo of the week: Thea Brandi
- Bottom two: Helene Skovsgaard Hansen & Simone Holme Pallesen
- Eliminated: Simone Holme Pallesen

=== Episode 6 ===
Original Airdate: October 7, 2015

- Challenge winners: Helene Skovsgaard Hansen, Kenni Nielsen & Malle Turpie
- Photo of the week: Lukas Anker
- Bottom two: Kenni Nielsen & Lukas Anker
- Eliminated: Lukas Anker

=== Episode 7 ===
Original Airdate: October 14, 2015

- Challenge winner: Daniel Kildevæld Madsen
- Performance of the week: Mark Christiansen Appadoo
- Bottom two: Helene Skovsgaard Hansen & Kenni Nielsen
- Eliminated: Kenni Nielsen

=== Episode 8 ===
Original Airdate: October 21, 2015

- Booked for campaign: Daniel Kildevæld Madsen & Helene Skovsgaard Hansen
- Photo of the week: Malle Turpie
- Bottom two: Helene Skovsgaard Hansen & Mark Christiansen Appadoo
- Eliminated: Helene Skovsgaard Hansen

=== Episode 9 ===
Original Airdate: October 28, 2015

This week the models had their go sees and at the photoshoot they had to impersonate a celebrity.

| Model | Celebrity |
|---|---|
| Daniel | David Bowie |
| Malle | Mick Jagger |
| Mark | Marilyn Manson |
| Thea | Coco Chanel |
| Thomas | Liza Minnelli |

- Challenge winner: Malle Turpie
- Photo of the week: Mark Christiansen Appadoo
- First Eliminated: Thomas Kahle
- Bottom two: Mark Christiansen Appadoo & Thea Brandi
- Eliminated: Thea Brandi
- Guest judge: Oliver Bjerrehuus

=== Episode 10 ===
Original Airdate: November 4, 2015

- Eliminated: Mark Christiansen Appadoo
- Final two: Daniel Kildevæld Madsen & Malle Turpie
- Denmark's Next Top Model: Daniel Kildevæld Madsen

== Summaries ==
=== Results table ===
| Place | Model | Episodes | | | | | | | | |
| Place | Model | 2 | 3 | 4 | 5 | 6 | 7 | 8 | 9 | 10 |
|---|---|---|---|---|---|---|---|---|---|---|
| 1 | Daniel | WIN | SAFE | SAFE | SAFE | SAFE | SAFE | SAFE | SAFE | Winner |
| 2 | Malle | SAFE | WIN | SAFE | SAFE | SAFE | SAFE | WIN | SAFE | OUT |
| 3 | Mark | SAFE | SAFE | SAFE | SAFE | SAFE | WIN | LOW | WIN | OUT |
| 4 | Thea | SAFE | SAFE | SAFE | WIN | SAFE | SAFE | SAFE | OUT | |
| 5 | Thomas | SAFE | SAFE | WIN | SAFE | SAFE | SAFE | SAFE | OUT | |
| 6 | Helene | SAFE | SAFE | SAFE | LOW | SAFE | LOW | OUT | | |
| 7 | Kenni | SAFE | LOW | SAFE | SAFE | LOW | OUT | | | |
| 8 | Lukas | SAFE | LOW | LOW | SAFE | OUT | | | | |
| 9 | Simone | SAFE | SAFE | SAFE | OUT | | | | | |
| 10 | Sultan | LOW | SAFE | OUT | | | | | | |
| 11 | Julia | SAFE | SAFE | OUT | | | | | | |
| 12 | Gustav | SAFE | OUT | | | | | | | |
| 13 | Kamilla | OUT | | | | | | | | |

The contestant won photo of the week
The contestant won photo of the week but was eliminated
The contestant was in danger of elimination
The contestant was eliminated
The contestant won the competition

=== Photo shoot guide ===
- Episode 1 photo shoot: Natural Beauty
- Episode 2 photo shoot: Fight Club sports editorial
- Episode 3 photo shoot: Saturday Night Fever
- Episode 4 photo shoot: Couples on the beach in B&W
- Episode 5 photo shoot: Fashion riot in the street
- Episode 6 photo shoot: Sailors on a yacht
- Episode 7 music video: "Say my name" - Kesi
- Episode 8 photo shoot: Poetic dog walkers
- Episode 9 photo shoot: Celebrity look-alikes
- Episode 10 photo shoot: Covers for COVER magazine
