= Danmarks Næste Topmodel season 2 =

Danmarks Næste Topmodel
- Season 2

Release
- Original network: Kanal 4
- Original release: September 22 – November 24, 2011

Season chronology
- ← Previous; Cycle 1 Next → Cycle 3

Danmarks Næste Topmodel, cycle 2 was the second individual cycle of the show. The judging panel, consisting of Caroline Fleming, Uffe Buchard and Jacqueline Friis-Mikkelsen remained the same for the second cycle in a row. The final cast was increased up to 15.

Like in the final episode of cycle 1, the call out order at the elimination process is now random and every girl learns her verdict individually whether she makes it to the next round or not. This format has been adapted from Germany's Next Topmodel.

Among with the prizes was a modeling contract with Unique Model Management, the cover and a 10-page spread in Elle Magazine Denmark and the chance to become the face of L'Oreal Paris.

Julie Hasselby was crowned the winner of the season. Hasselby was the second lesbian winner of the franchise.

== Contestants ==
Contestant	Age	Height	Hometown	Finish	Place
Camilla Sebens	19	1.74 m (5 ft 8 1/2 in)	Hvidovre	Episode 2	15–14
Cecilie Nilsson	18	1.76 m (5 ft 9 1/2 in)	Lillerød	Episode 2	15–14
Josefine Hewitt	17	1.75 m (5 ft 9 in)	Varde	Episode 3	13
Sara Amira Abdelghani	17	1.74 m (5 ft 8 1/2 in)	Ballerup	Episode 4	12–11
Zola Olsen	23	1.71 m (5 ft 7 1/2 in)	Copenhagen	Episode 4	12–11
Nanna Stenner Nielsen	19	1.70 m (5 ft 7 in)	Sønderborg	Episode 5	10
Amalie Carlé Fischer	16	1.79 m (5 ft 10 1/2 in)	Herlev	Episode 6	9
Silvija Vukovic	21	1.79 m (5 ft 10 1/2 in)	Frederiksberg	Episode 7	8–7
Kimmi Rønnebæk	16	1.72 m (5 ft 7 1/2 in)	Ballerup	Episode 7	8–7
Johanna Adwah Ayima Kjærbo	23	1.72 m (5 ft 7 1/2 in)	Valby	Episode 9	6
Shenna Salih	21	1.73 m (5 ft 8 in)	Tilst	Episode 10	5
Carla Kruse	22	1.81 m (5 ft 11 1/2 in)	Odense	Episode 10	4
Natasja Ligaard Smith	16	1.71 m (5 ft 7 1/2 in)	Kastrup	Episode 10	3
Nanna Liin Sørensen	17	1.76 m (5 ft 9 1/2 in)	Højbjerg	Episode 10	2
Julie Nyman Hasselby	20	1.78 m (5 ft 10 in)	Viby Sjælland	Episode 10	1

== Episode summaries ==
=== Episode 2 ===
- Photo of the Week: Carla Kruse
- Eliminated: Camilla Sebens & Cecilie Nilsson

=== Episode 3 ===
- Photo of the Week: Nanna Liin Sørensen
- Eliminated: Josefine Hewitt

=== Episode 4 ===
- Photo of the Week: Amalie Fischer
- Eliminated: Zola Olsen
- Bottom two: Sara Abdelghani & Silvija Vukovic
- Eliminated: Sara Abdelghani

=== Episode 5 ===
- Photo of the Week: Johanna Kjærbo
- Eliminated: Nanna Stenner

=== Episode 6 ===
- Photo of the Week: Julie Hasselby
- Eliminated: Amalie Fischer

=== Episode 7 ===
- Photo of the Week: Julie Hasselby
- Eliminated: Kimmi Rønnebæk
- Bottom two: Natasja Smith & Silvija Vukovic
- Eliminated: Silvija Vukovic

=== Episode 8 ===
- Photo of the Week: Nanna Liin Sørensen
- Eliminated: None

=== Episode 9 ===
- Photo of the Week: Julie Hasselby
- Bottom two: Johanna Kjærbo & Shenna Salih
- Eliminated: Johanna Kjærbo

=== Episode 10 ===
- Eliminated outside of judging panel: Carla Kruse & Shenna Salih
- Bottom two: Julie Hasselby & Natasja Smith
- Eliminated: Natasja Smith
- Final two: Julie Hasselby & Nanna Liin Sørensen
- Denmark's Next Top Model: Julie Hasselby

== Summaries ==
=== Results table ===
Place	Model	Episodes									
Place	Model	2	3	4	5	6	7	8	9	10	
1	Julie	SAFE	SAFE	SAFE	LOW	WIN	WIN	LOW	WIN	LOW	Winner
2	Nanna Liin	SAFE	WIN	SAFE	SAFE	SAFE	SAFE	WIN	SAFE	SAFE	Runner-up
3	Natasja	SAFE	SAFE	SAFE	SAFE	LOW	LOW	SAFE	SAFE	OUT	
4	Carla	WIN	SAFE	SAFE	SAFE	SAFE	SAFE	LOW	SAFE	OUT	
5	Shenna	SAFE	SAFE	SAFE	LOW	SAFE	SAFE	SAFE	LOW	OUT	
6	Johanna	SAFE	SAFE	SAFE	WIN	LOW	SAFE	SAFE	OUT		
7	Silvija	SAFE	SAFE	LOW	SAFE	SAFE	OUT				
8	Kimmi	SAFE	SAFE	SAFE	SAFE	SAFE	OUT				
9	Amalie	SAFE	SAFE	WIN	SAFE	OUT					
10	Nanna S.	SAFE	SAFE	SAFE	OUT						
11	Zola	SAFE	SAFE	OUT							
12	Sara	SAFE	SAFE	OUT							
13	Josefine	SAFE	OUT								
14	Cecilie	OUT									
15	Camilla	OUT									

The contestant won photo of the week
The contestant was eliminated outside the judging panel
The contestant was in danger of elimination
The contestant was eliminated
The contestant won the competition

=== Photo shoot guide ===
- Episode 1 photo shoot: Promotional pictures (casting)
- Episode 2 photo shoot: Gossip magazine covers
- Episode 3 photo shoot: Reebok campaign with male models
- Episode 4 photo shoot: Splattered with paint
- Episode 5 commercial: Pet Diet spider food with spider
- Episode 6 photo shoot: The Butcher movie posters
- Episode 7 photo shoot: Circus scenarios
- Episode 8 photo shoot: Wicked Game inspired beach shoot
- Episode 9 photo shoot: Lost in the desert
- Episode 10 photo shoot: L'Oréal beauty shots
