= Danmarks Næste Topmodel season 1 =

Danmarks Næste Topmodel
- Season 1

Release
- Original network: Kanal 4
- Original release: September 22 – November 23, 2010

Season chronology
- Next → Cycle 2

Danmarks Næste Topmodel, cycle 1 was the first Danish adaptation of Tyra Banks' America's Next Top Model, hosted by Caroline Fleming with thirteen contestants.

Prizes included a modelling contract with Unique Models, a trip to Paris along with a test shoot for Ford Models, a cover appearance and 10-page spread in Elle Magazine Denmark, and the chance to become the face of L'Oreal Paris.

The winner of the competition was Caroline Bader from Nærum. At 15 years old, Bader was the youngest winner of the Top Model franchise at the time of her victory, and retained that status until the following year, when Laura Giurcanu won the second cycle of the Romanian adaptation at the age of 14.

== Contestants ==
(ages stated are at start of contest)

Name	Age	Height	Hometown	Finish	Place
Sofia Sakko	22	176 cm (5 ft 9 1/2 in)	Brønshøj	Episode 2	13
Astrid Bech Augustinussen	21	179 cm (5 ft 10 1/2 in)	Kolding	Episode 3	12
Serina Jensen	16	174 cm (5 ft 8 1/2 in)	Korsør	Episode 4	11
Emma Penthien	18	176 cm (5 ft 9 1/2 in)	Copenhagen	Episode 5	10
Nanna Jo Borgersen	19	178 cm (5 ft 10 in)	Odense	Episode 6	9
Elise Dubois	19	175 cm (5 ft 9 in)	Aarhus	Episode 7	8 (DQ)
Rochel Rasmusen	23	176 cm (5 ft 9 1/2 in)	Copenhagen	Episode 8	7
Laila McFarlan	23	179 cm (5 ft 10 1/2 in)	Malmö, Sweden	Episode 9	6
Isabella Kaufmann	23	170 cm (5 ft 7 in)	Frederiksberg	Episode 9	5
Karen Ziefeldt	18	177.5 cm (5 ft 10 in)	Nyborg	Episode 10	4–3
Stephanie Strarup	15	173 cm (5 ft 8 in)	Morud	Episode 10	4–3
Brinette Odgaard	20	173.5 cm (5 ft 8 1/2 in)	Aalborg	Episode 10	2
Caroline Bader	14	171 cm (5 ft 7 1/2 in)	Nærum	Episode 10	1

== Episode summaries ==
=== Episode 1 ===
First aired September 22, 2010

100 hopeful girls arrive at the Hotel Marriott in Copenhagen, but a third of them are immediately eliminated following a catwalk competition. The top 36 are interviewed by the judging panel and the number of contestants is then lowered to 20. After a photo shoot with photographer Dennis Stenild, the judging panel then decides on the top 13 girls.

- Featured photographer: Dennis Stenild

=== Episode 2 ===
First aired September 29, 2010

The girls receive their first runway lesson by fashion expert and mentor Uffe Buchard. In their first challenge, the girls have to walk the runway wearing three different outfits. Rochel exceeds Uffe Buchard's expectations, winning the challenge. There follows a Femme Fatale-inspired photo shoot.

Serina, Caroline, Brinette, and Elise impress the judges, while Emma, Sofia, and Laila are criticized.

- First call-out: Serina Jensen
- Bottom two: Laila McFarlan & Sofia Sakko
- Eliminated: Sofia Sakko
- Featured photographer: Helle Moosthe
- Guest judges: Helle Moos, Lene Nystrøm
- Special guest: Marie Erwolter

=== Episode 3 ===
First aired October 6, 2010

The girls receive makeovers, which causes mixed feelings as some do not like their new looks. In a fashion show for Birger Christensen, a high-profile furrier, competitors model fur coats while showing off their new looks. Stephanie wins the challenge and the prize, a fur stole. In a photo shoot, the girls pose in only a white shirt and knickers, while in a bed with two male models. At judging, most of the girls are praised for their photos, while their attitudes during the makeover are discussed. Caroline is praised for her sexy poses, despite her age. Elise is called out for being mean towards Stephanie.

- First call-out: Caroline Bader
- Bottom two: Astrid Bech Augustinussen & Serina Jensen
- Eliminated: Astrid Bech Augustinussen
- Featured Photographer: Sean McMenomy
- Guest judges: Oliver Bjerrehuus, Sean McMenomy

=== Episode 4 ===
First aired October 13, 2010

The girls are given runway lessons, and then pose in lingerie in front of a lingerie shop. Elise declines to participate in this challenge. Brinette and Caroline are declared joint winners. At a photoshoot the girls pose in colorful gowns, and it is announced that the competitors will travel to Paris after the elimination. Brinette, Nanna Jo, and Isabella impress the judges. Elise is praised by the photographer but is judged for not participating in a challenge.

- First call-out: Nanna Jo Borgersen
- Bottom two: Elise Dubois & Serina Jensen
- Eliminated: Serina Jensen
- Featured Photographer: Bjarke Johansen
- Guest judges: Oliver Bjerrehuus, Tanya Pedersen

=== Episode 5 ===
First aired October 20, 2010

The contestants fly to Paris, arriving at their hotel at night. The next morning, Elise discusses her eating disorder with the other girls, but becomes worried that they will tell the judges about it; Brinette does not believe her. Caroline arrives at the one-on-one session with the girls at the hotel. The girls are then invited to a cocktail party, which is actually a secret challenge as three judges attend the party. Laila wins the challenge and a year's supply of L'Oréal Paris products.

The following day is a photo shoot for L'Oréal Paris, after which the girls visit a French restaurant with Caroline Fleming. After the dinner party, Brinette's birthday is celebrated at a nightclub. At the judging, most of the girls are criticized; Karen changes drastically in front of judges but her photo is disappointing. Stephanie screams to prove to the judges that she trying to come out her shell; Elise's Stellar Beauty shot earns her first place.

- First call-out: Elise Dubois
- Bottom two: Emma Penthien & Rochel Rasmusen
- Eliminated: Emma Penthien

=== Episode 6 ===
First aired October 27, 2010

The contestants receive a fashion lesson with Uffe and a stylist and are then challenged to create an outfit in 15 minutes. Karen wins; the girls surprise Caroline at her confirmation party. An haute couture shoot on a boat follows; Karen, Isabella and Rochel pose alone while the rest of the girls pose in pairs. Meanwhile, Brinette, Elise, and Isabella decide to try to find the waiter Isabella had flirted with at a nightclub. At the judging panel, Brinette, Elise, and Stephanie impressed the judges while Laila and Isabella are criticized.

- First call-out: Stephanie Strarup
- Bottom two: Isabella Kaufmann & Nanna Jo Borgersen
- Eliminated: Nanna Jo Borgerson

=== Episode 7 ===
First aired November 3, 2010

Back in Denmark, the contestants are challenged to perform Romeo and Juliet with a male actor. Brinette wins after a slow start and receives a trip to a spa with a friend (Caroline) and double the amount of time at the photoshoot. Additionally, two girls have to clean and cook for her for two days (Rochel and Laila); Laila cries after she is chosen.

At the photoshoot, the girls are given two attempts for mock action posters (Brinette gets four attempts). Elise goes to the bathroom with Stephanie, and is seen throwing up (due to her eating disorder); Stephanie waits in the shower, covering her eyes and ears. The judges decide that she must exit the competition, to get treatment for her condition.

- Disqualified: Elise Dubois

The judges continue critique the remaining seven girls. Brinette, Caroline, and Karen impress the judges. Isabella is provoked by one of the judges who didn't see her as a model.

- First call-out: Brinette Odgaard
- Bottom two: Laila McFarlan & Isabella Kaufmann
- Originally eliminated: Isabella Kaufmann

=== Episode 8 ===
First aired November 10, 2010

The girls arrive at a photo shoot without Karen and Laila, who eventually arrive two hours late. The photographer is an actor and the "photo shoot" is a secret challenge to pose with snakes and spiders, in lingerie, in a mock photoshoot. Isabella impresses Uffe with her 'provocativeness' in the challenge, but other contestants, like Brinette and Rochel, are very uncomfortable due to the snakes and spiders. Stephanie is declared the winner.

At the actual photo shoot, the girls take part in a campaign for Elle. The girls are surprised to hear that they will go to London, but, at the airport, Caroline appears and tells them that there will be an elimination. Stephanie, Isabella, and Caroline impress the judges, Karen is criticized for not wearing the right clothing and Laila for arriving late to the challenge. In the end, Stephanie, Caroline, and Brinette are chosen to be in the Elle Campaign.

- First call-out: Stephanie Strarup
- Bottom two: Laila McFarlan & Rochel Rasmusen
- Eliminated: Rochel Rasmusen

=== Episode 9 ===
First aired November 17th, 2010

The girls arrive in London and travel to Underwater Studios for their photo shoot with Georg Jensen for a jewelry collection campaign. Laila feels ill, can't get her injection appointment for B12, and worries about her place in the competition. In the evening, most of the girls visit a nightclub. The following day at Georg Jensen Jewelry, Caroline announces that Laila is to be eliminated

- Eliminated Outside of Judging Panel: Laila MacFarlen

The remaining five girls complete a go-see challenge finding their way around London, with a prize of 50.000kr worth of jewelry from the Georg Jensen Moonlight Collection. Brinette, Isabella, and Karen are successful, but Stephanie and Caroline are slower. Brinette, is chosen as the challenge winner, but she chooses to share her prize with Caroline too.

- First call-out: Brinette Odgaard
- Bottom two: Caroline Bader & Isabella Kaufmann
- Eliminated: Isabella Kaufmann

=== Episode 10 ===
First aired November 23, 2010

- Eliminated: Karen Ziefeldt & Stephanie Strarup
- Final two: Brinette Odgaard & Caroline Bader
- Denmark's Next Top Model: Caroline Bader

== Summaries ==
=== Call-out order ===
Order	Episodes										
Order	1	2	3	4	5	6	7	8	9	10	
1	Brinette	Serina	Caroline	Nanna Jo	Elise	Stephanie	Brinette	Stephanie	Brinette	Karen	Caroline
2	Rochel	Karen	Brinette	Brinette	Nanna Jo	Elise	Caroline	Isabella	Stephanie	Caroline	Brinette
3	Caroline	Caroline	Rochel	Isabella	Isabella	Rochel	Karen	Caroline	Karen	Brinette	
4	Emma	Astrid	Karen	Emma	Caroline	Caroline	Rochel	Karen	Caroline	Stephanie	
5	Karen	Stephanie	Laila	Caroline	Laila	Brinette	Stephanie	Brinette	Isabella		
6	Nanna Jo	Emma	Emma	Laila	Stephanie	Karen	Laila	Laila	Laila		
7	Sofia	Brinette	Elise	Karen	Karen	Laila	Isabella	Rochel			
8	Stephanie	Nanna Jo	Isabella	Stephanie	Brinette	Isabella	Elise				
9	Astrid	Elise	Stephanie	Rochel	Rochel	Nanna Jo					
10	Serina	Isabella	Nanna Jo	Elise	Emma						
11	Laila	Rochel	Serina	Serina							
12	Elise	Laila	Astrid								
13	Isabella	Sofia									

Contestant eliminated
Contestant disqualified from competition
Contestant was original eliminee but was saved
Contestant eliminated outside of judging panel
Contestant won competition

- In Episode 1, the pool of 20 girls was reduced to the final 13 who would move on to the main competition. This first call-out does not reflect their performance.
- In Episode 7, Elise was disqualified before the call-out because the judges suspected her of suffering from bulimia. Otherwise, Isabella would have been eliminated.
- In Episode 9, Laila was eliminated outside of the judging panel.
- In Episode 10, the girls were called individually and in no particular order to face their verdict.

=== Photo shoot guide ===
- Episode 1 photo shoot: Casting photos
- Episode 2 photo shoot: Femme fatales
- Episode 3 photo shoot: Sexual chemistry with a pair of male models
- Episode 4 photo shoot: Suspended in the air wearing colorful gowns
- Episode 5 photo shoot: Glamorous and edgy beauty shots
- Episode 6 photo shoot: Parisian couture in pairs
- Episode 7 photo shoot: Action movie posters
- Episode 8 photo shoot: Elle campaign
- Episode 9 photo shoot: Underwater jewelry for Georg Jensen.
- Episode 10 commercial & photo shoot: Egekilde water bottle; B&W nude with accessories
