= Danmarks Næste Topmodel season 5 =

Danmarks Næste Topmodel
- Season 5

Release
- Original network: Kanal 5
- Original release: September 25 – November 27, 2014

Season chronology
- ← Previous; Cycle 4 Next → Cycle 6

Danmarks Næste Topmodel, cycle 5 was the fifth cycle of Danmarks Næste Topmodel. Caroline Fleming remained as the show's host for season five. The season began to air on September 25, 2014.

Among with the prizes was a modeling contract with Unique Model Management and the cover spread in COVER magazine Denmark.

The winner was 17-year-old Sarah Kildevæld Madsen from Horsens. The following year Kildevæld Madsen's younger brother, Daniel, won the following cycle of Danmarks Næste Topmodel.

== Contestants ==
(ages stated are at start of contest)

Contestant	Age	Height	Hometown	Finish	Place
Michelle Desideriussen	18	1.72 m (5 ft 7 1/2 in)	Kastrup	Episode 2	13 (quit)
Mirah Davidsen	15	1.81 m (5 ft 11 1/2 in)	Randers	Episode 3	12
Julie 'Lund' Larsen	15	1.80 m (5 ft 11 in)	Greve	Episode 4	11
Emilie "Mille" Frederikke Mørck	17	1.75 m (5 ft 9 in)	Hellerup	Episode 4	10
Ceelin Aila	15	1.81 m (5 ft 11 1/2 in)	Herlev	Episode 5	9
Danielle Svendsen	20	1.77 m (5 ft 9 1/2 in)	Odense	Episode 6	8
Cristine Pedersen	15	1.74 m (5 ft 8 1/2 in)	Randers	Episode 7	7
Mollie Marie Edelved	15	1.79 m (5 ft 10 1/2 in)	Holbæk	Episode 8	6
Mira Elise 'Mini' Obling	15	1.72 m (5 ft 7 1/2 in)	Fredericia	Episode 9	5–4
Louise 'Louie' Simmersholm	18	1.78 m (5 ft 10 in)	Vemmedrup	Episode 9	5–4
Sally Amanda Høyer Nielsen	15	1.81 m (5 ft 11 1/2 in)	Næstved	Episode 10	3
Julie 'Lu' Toft Jørgensen	15	1.81 m (5 ft 11 1/2 in)	Roskilde	Episode 10	2
Sarah Kildevæld Madsen	17	1.84 m (6 ft 1/2 in)	Horsens	Episode 10	1

== Episode summaries ==
=== Episode 1 ===
- Photo of the week: Mille Mørck
- Featured photographer: Sean McMenomy
- Special guests: Jesper Thomsen, Camilla Vest

=== Episode 2 ===
- Photo of the week: Sally Høyer
- Bottom two: Lund Larsen & Michelle Desideriussen
- Quit: Michelle Desideriussen
- Featured photographer: Nicky De Silva
- Special guests: Gun-Britt Zeller, Henrik Bang

=== Episode 3 ===
- Challenge winners: Cristine Pedersen, Danielle Svendsen & Mollie Edelved
- Photo of the Week: Louie Simmersholm
- Eliminated: Mirah Davidsen
- Bottom two: Ceelin Aila & Danielle Svendsen

=== Episode 4 ===
- Challenge winner: Mini Obling
- Photo of the week: Sarah Kildevæld Madsen
- Eliminated: Lund Larsen
- Bottom two: Lu Toft Jørgensen & Mille Mørck
- Eliminated: Mille Mørck

=== Episode 5 ===
- Challenge winner: Mollie Edelved
- Photo of the week: Lu Toft Jørgensen
- Bottom two: Ceelin Aila & Louie Simmersholm
- Eliminated: Ceelin Aila

=== Episode 6 ===
- Challenge winner: Sarah Kildevæld Madsen
- Photo of the week: Mini Obling
- Bottom two: Cristine Pedersen & Danielle Svendsen
- Eliminated: Danielle Svendsen

=== Episode 7 ===
- Challenge winner: Lu Toft Jørgensen
- Video of the week: Lu Toft Jørgensen
- Bottom two: Cristine Pedersen & Mollie Edelved
- Eliminated: Cristine Pedersen

=== Episode 8 ===
- Challenge winner: Lu Toft Jørgensen
- Photo of the week: Louie Simmersholm
- Bottom two: Sarah Kildevæld Madsen & Mollie Edelved
- Eliminated: Mollie Edelved

=== Episode 9 ===
- Challenge winner: Louie Simmersholm
- First eliminated: Mini Obling
- Photo of the week: Sally Høyer
- Second eliminated: Louie Simmersholm

=== Episode 10 ===
- Final three: Lu Toft Jørgensen, Sally Høyer & MiniObling
- Danmarks Næste Topmodel: Sarah Kildevæld Madsen

== Summaries ==
=== Results table ===
Place	Model	Episodes									
Place	Model	1	2	3	4	5	6	7	8	9	10
1	Sarah	SAFE	SAFE	SAFE	WIN	SAFE	SAFE	SAFE	SAFE	SAFE	Winner
2	Lu	SAFE	SAFE	SAFE	LOW	WIN	SAFE	WIN	SAFE	SAFE	OUT
3	Sally	SAFE	WIN	SAFE	SAFE	SAFE	SAFE	SAFE	SAFE	WIN	OUT
4	Louie	SAFE	SAFE	WIN	SAFE	LOW	SAFE	SAFE	WIN	OUT	
5	Mini	SAFE	SAFE	SAFE	SAFE	SAFE	WIN	SAFE	LOW	OUT	
6	Mollie	SAFE	SAFE	SAFE	SAFE	SAFE	SAFE	LOW	OUT		
7	Cristine	SAFE	SAFE	SAFE	SAFE	SAFE	LOW	OUT			
8	Danielle	SAFE	SAFE	LOW	SAFE	SAFE	OUT				
9	Ceelin	SAFE	SAFE	LOW	SAFE	OUT					
10	Mille	WIN	SAFE	SAFE	OUT						
11	Lund	SAFE	LOW	SAFE	OUT						
12	Mirah	SAFE	SAFE	OUT							
13	Michelle	SAFE	OUT								

The contestant won photo of the week
The contestant was in danger of elimination
The contestant was eliminated
The contestant won the competition

=== Photo shoot guide ===
- Episode 1 photo shoot: Promotional pictures in school girl outfits (casting)
- Episode 2 photo shoot: Urban picnic for Renault Twingo
- Episode 3 photo shoot: Burlesque in a giant martini glass
- Episode 4 photo shoot: 60's movement in B&W
- Episode 5 photo shoot: Medieval editorial
- Episode 6 photo shoot: Vampire couples
- Episode 7 music video: "Ready for me now" - Joey Moe
- Episode 8 photo shoot: English upper class
- Episode 9 photo shoot: Four seasons beauty shots
- Episode 10 photo shoot: Covers for COVER magazine
