= Danmarks Næste Topmodel season 3 =

Danmarks Næste Topmodel
- Season 3

Release
- Original network: Kanal 4
- Original release: September 20 – November 22, 2012

Season chronology
- ← Previous; Cycle 2 Next → Cycle 4

Danmarks Næste Topmodel, cycle 3 was the third cycle of the show. Caroline Fleming and Uffe Buchard remained on the show while Jacqueline Friis-Mikkelsen left the panel. New judges were model and sex symbol Oliver Bjerrehuus and Unique-casting agent Jesper Thomsen. The show began to air on September 20, 2012.

Like in the previous cycle, the call out order at the elimination process is now random and every girl learns her verdict individually whether she makes it to the next round or not. This format has been adapted from Germany's Next Topmodel.

Among with the prizes was a modeling contract with Unique Model Management and the cover spread in COVER magazine Denmark.

Line Rehkopff was crowned the winner of the season.

== Contestants ==
(ages stated are at start of contest)

Contestant	Age	Height	Hometown	Finish	Place
Simone Pedersen	19	1.75 m (5 ft 9 in)	Hvidovre	Episode 2	15–14
Bianca Weisshaupt	22	1.78 m (5 ft 10 in)	Nørresundby	Episode 2	15–14
Yasmina Bach	19	1.74 m (5 ft 8 1/2 in)	Aalborg	Episode 3	13
Caroline Baastrup Larsen	21	1.78 m (5 ft 10 in)	Vanløse	Episode 4	12
Ida Gottlieb Taarnhøj	17	1.72 m (5 ft 7 1/2 in)	Odense	Episode 5	11
Sasja Andersen	17	1.76 m (5 ft 9 1/2 in)	Herlev	Episode 6	10
Nanna Nielsen Wentzel	15	1.75 m (5 ft 9 in)	Taastrup	Episode 7	9
Hanna Rolsted Jensen	15	1.76 m (5 ft 9 1/2 in)	Sorø	Episode 7	8
Emma Rolsted Jensen	15	1.77 m (5 ft 9 1/2 in)	Sorø	Episode 8	7–6
Christina Birk Simonsen	22	1.74 m (5 ft 8 1/2 in)	Aalborg	Episode 8	7–6
Gudrun Eir Hermannsdottir	20	1.73 m (5 ft 8 in)	Esbjerg	Episode 9	5–4
Anna Møller Levsen	15	1.76 m (5 ft 9 1/2 in)	Janderup	Episode 9	5–4
Marie Louise Bang	19	1.78 m (5 ft 10 in)	Aarhus	Episode 10	3
Julie Lillelund	17	1.78 m (5 ft 10 in)	Viby J	Episode 10	2
Line Rehkopff	18	1.75 m (5 ft 9 in)	Odense	Episode 10	1

== Episode summaries ==
=== Episode 1 ===
This was the casting episode.

=== Episode 2 ===
- Wall of fame: Gudrun Eir Hermannsdottir
- Eliminated: Bianca Weisshaupt
- Bottom two: Yasmina Bach & Simone Pedersen
- Eliminated: Simone Pedersen

=== Episode 3 ===
- Challenge winner: Christina Birk Simonsen
- Wall of fame: Nanna Wentzel
- Eliminated: Yasmina Bach

=== Episode 4 ===
- Challenge winner: Line Rehkopff
- Wall of fame: Julie Lillelund
- Bottom two: Marie Louise Bang & Caroline Baastrup Larsen
- Eliminated: Caroline Baastrup Larsen

=== Episode 5 ===
- Challenge winner: Line Rehkopff
- Wall of Fame: Gudrun Eir Hermannsdottir
- Bottom two: Ida Gottlieb & Julie Lillelund
- Eliminated: Ida Gottlieb

=== Episode 6 ===
- Challenge winner: Anna Møller Levsen
- Wall of fame: Julie Lillelund
- Bottom two: Sasja Andersen & Nanna Wentzel
- Eliminated: Sasja Andersen

=== Episode 7 ===
- Eliminated outside of judging panel: Nanna Wentzel
- Challenge winner: Line Rehkopff
- Wall of fame: Marie Louise Bang
- Bottom two: Emma Rolsted Jensen & Hanna Rolsted Jensen
- Eliminated: Hanna Rolsted Jensen

=== Episode 8 ===
- Challenge winner: Julie Lillelund
- Wall of fame: Julie Lillelund
- Eliminated: Christina Birk Simonsen
- Bottom two: Line Rehkopff & Emma Rolsted Jensen
- Eliminated: Emma Rolsted Jensen

=== Episode 9 ===
- Challenge winner: Marie Louise Bang
- Wall of fame: Line Rehkopff
- Eliminated: Anna Møller Levsen
- Bottom two: Gudrun Eir Hermannsdottir & Julie Lillelund
- Eliminated: Gudrun Eir Hermannsdottir

=== Episode 10 ===
- Final three: Julie Lillelund, Line Rehkopff & Marie Louise Bang
- Second runner-up: Marie Louise Bang
- Runner-up: Julie Lillelund
- Danmarks Næste Topmodel: Line Rehkopff

== Summaries ==
=== Results table ===
Place	Model	Episodes								
Place	Model	2	3	4	5	6	7	8	9	10
1	Line	SAFE	SAFE	SAFE	SAFE	SAFE	SAFE	LOW	WIN	Winner
2	Julie	SAFE	SAFE	WIN	LOW	WIN	SAFE	WIN	LOW	OUT
3	Marie Louise	SAFE	SAFE	LOW	SAFE	SAFE	WIN	SAFE	SAFE	OUT
4	Gudrun Eir	WIN	SAFE	SAFE	WIN	SAFE	SAFE	SAFE	OUT	
5	Anna	SAFE	SAFE	SAFE	SAFE	SAFE	SAFE	SAFE	OUT	
6	Emma	SAFE	SAFE	SAFE	SAFE	SAFE	LOW	OUT		
7	Christina	SAFE	SAFE	SAFE	SAFE	SAFE	SAFE	OUT		
8	Hanna	SAFE	SAFE	SAFE	SAFE	SAFE	OUT			
9	Nanna	SAFE	WIN	SAFE	SAFE	LOW	OUT			
10	Sasja	SAFE	SAFE	SAFE	SAFE	OUT				
11	Ida	SAFE	SAFE	SAFE	OUT					
12	Caroline	SAFE	SAFE	OUT						
13	Yasmina	LOW	OUT							
14	Simone	OUT								
15	Bianca	OUT								

The contestant won photo of the week
The contestant was eliminated outside the judging panel
The contestant was in danger of elimination
The contestant was eliminated
The contestant won the competition

=== Photo shoot guide ===
- Episode 1 photo shoot: Metallic swimsuits (casting)
- Episode 2 photo shoot: Rock stars
- Episode 3 photo shoot: Posing on a mound of hay
- Episode 4 photo shoot: Couture delivery for ILVA
- Episode 5 music video: Chemistry with Christopher
- Episode 6 photo shoot: Trailer trash
- Episode 7 photo shoot: Lingerie in Milan
- Episode 8 photo shoot: 'Rich bitches'
- Episode 9 photo shoot: Covers for COVER magazine
- Episode 10 photo shoot: Celebrity beauty shots
