= Danmarks Næste Topmodel =

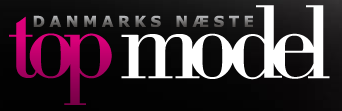
- Genre: Reality television
- Created by: Tyra Banks
- Presented by: Caroline Fleming (1-5); Cecilie Lassen (6)
- Country of origin: Denmark
- No. of episodes: 60

Production
- Running time: 60 minutes

Original release
- Network: Kanal 4
- Release: September 22, 2010 – November 4, 2015

Danmarks Næste Topmodel (English: Denmark's Next Top Model), or simply Topmodel, is a Danish reality television show and an adaptation of America's Next Top Model, created by Tyra Banks. It began to be broadcast on Kanal 4 with Caroline Fleming being the host. After the fifth season, Fleming announced that she would not continue hosting the show. She was replaced by Cecilie Lassen for season 6.

== Judges ==
| Judges | Seasons | | | | | |
| Judges | 1 (2010) | 2 (2011) | 3 (2012) | 4 (2013) | 5 (2014) | 6 (2015) |
Hosts
| Caroline Fleming | Host | Host | Host | Host | Host | |
| Cecilie Lassen | | | | | | Host |
Judging Panelists
| Uffe Buchard | Main | Main | Main | Main | Main | Main |
| Jacqueline Friis-Mikkelsen | Main | Main | | Guest | | |
| Oliver Bjerrehuus | | | Main | Main | Guest | Guest |
| Jesper Thomsen | | | Main | Main | Main | Main |
| Christiane Schaumberg-Müller | | Guest | Guest | Main | | |

== Cycles ==
| Cycle | Premiere date | Winner | Runner-up | Other contestants in order of elimination | Number of contestants | International Destinations |
|---|---|---|---|---|---|---|
| 1 | 22 September 2010 | Caroline Bader | Brinette Odgaard | Sofia Sakko, Astrid Bech Augustinussen, Serina Jensen, Emma Penthien, Nanna Jo Borgersen, Elise Dubois (disqualified), Rochel Rasmusen, Laila McFarlan, Isabella Kaufmann, Karen Ziefeldt & Stephanie Strarup | 13 | Paris; London |
| 2 | 22 September 2011 | Julie Nyman Hasselby | Nanna Liin Sørensen | Camilla Sebens & Cecilie Nilsson, Josefine Hewitt, Zola Olsen & Sara Abdelghani, Nanna Stenner Nielsen, Amalie Carlé Fischer, Kimmi Rønnebæk & Silvija Vukovic, Johanna Adwah Ayima Kjærbo, Shenna Salih & Carla Kruse, Natasja Ligaard Smith | 15 | Barcelona; Ibiza |
| 3 | 20 September 2012 | Line Rehkopff | Julie Lillelund | Bianca Weisshaupt & Simone Pedersen, Yasmina Bach, Caroline Baastrup Larsen, Ida Gottlieb Taarnhøj, Sasja Andersen, Nanna Nielsen Wentzel, Hanna Rolsted Jensen, Emma Rolsted Jensen & Christina Birk Simonsen, Anna Møller Levsen & Gudrun Eir Hermannsdottir, Marie Louise Bang | 15 | Milan |
| 4 | 19 September 2013 | Louise Mørck Mikkelsen | Caroline Hollitsch & Catrine Juhl | Klara Lau, Sille Rieck & Petronelle Schultz, Rebecca Rovsing, Andrea Helander, Mette Christensen & Amalie Egemose, Anne Holth, Josephine Bach Jacobsen, Caroline Sebber Colfelt & Amanda Bo Elfving, Anne-Kathrine Petersen Bach | 15 | Paris |
| 5 | 25 September 2014 | Sarah Kildevæld Madsen | Lu Toft Jørgensen | Michelle Desideriussen (quit), Mirah Davidsen, Lund Larsen & Mille Mørck, Ceelin Aila, Danielle Svendsen, Cristine Pedersen, Mollie Edelved, Mini Obling & Louie Simmersholm, Sally Høyer Nielsen | 13 | London |
| 6 | 2 September 2015 | Daniel Kildevæld Madsen | Malle Turpie | Kamilla Spinola Sørensen, Gustav Pedersen, Julia Just Holch & Issa Sultan, Simone Holme Pallesen, Lukas Anker, Kenni Nielsen, Helene Skovsgaard Hansen, Thea Brandi & Thomas Kahle, Mark Christiansen Appadoo | 13 | None |

== See also ==
- Top Model (Scandinavia)
