= 7'eren =

Danish television station

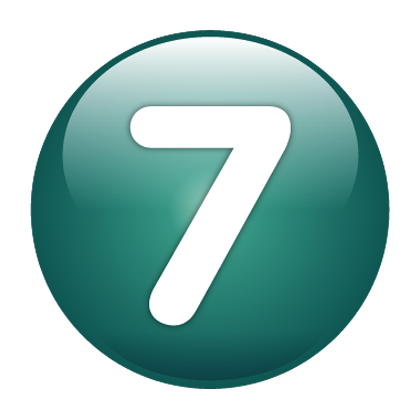

Programming
- Language: Danish

Ownership
- Owner: Discovery Networks Danmark
- Sister channels: Kanal 4 Kanal 5; 6'eren Discovery Channel; TLC

History
- Launched: 1 January 2012; 14 years ago (program block); 1 January 2013; 13 years ago (TV channel)
- Closed: 31 October 2014; 11 years ago
- Replaced by: Investigation Discovery

The Voice TV was the name of a Danish television station that broadcast music videos 24 hours a day. 7'eren was launched on January 1, 2012, as a programming block on The Voice TV, and a year later, on January 1, 2013, the channel renamed The Voice TV into 7'eren, by rebranding itself as a channel for youth programming.

The same happened to Finland's The Voice, it changed named Kutonen on 1 September 2012. The Voice channels are in different countries.

Due to poor ratings, the station was closed by the end of October 2014 and replaced with a Danish version of Investigation Discovery. The replacement was due to the success of criminal TV series and factual content, such as the CSI franchise.
