= Madland =

Madland is a surname. Notable people with the surname include:

- Daniel Madland (born 1977), Kurdish singer and television host
- Ernst Madland (1927–1984), Norwegian gymnast
- Tove Elise Madland (born 1965), Norwegian politician
