= Danish television drama =

Overview of television shows in Denmark

Danish television dramas have come to represent an important and popular aspect of TV broadcasting in Denmark, especially since the 1970s.

One of the most successful Danish drama series in the 70s was Matador (1978), which has been repeated many times as well as being released on DVD. For many years, Danish television drama suffered from what has been dubbed the "Matador complex": every new drama series would be marketed as "the new Matador" – only to be found, by both critics and the general viewing public, not to measure up in the event.

Since the late 1990s, Danish television has once again enjoyed increasing success with a large number of drama series. Often aired in primetime on Sunday evenings, they have generally drawn large audiences, received very good reviews, and several have earned international awards. DR (Denmark's national public-service broadcasting organization) won four Emmy Awards for Best international drama series between 2002 and 2009, breaking a former UK monopoly in that category, as well as a fifth Emmy in the Best international TV Movie/Mini Series category.

Danish film directors as well the Danish Film Institute have warned that the growth in television drama drains the Danish film industry of talent, particularly scriptwriters. They maintain that film producers operate on market conditions while particularly DR, funded by a broadcast receiving licence fee, is able to pay better salaries. The television stations are also able to offer longer contracts and more responsibility.

In 2014 the success achieved by several Danish TV drama series in gaining international attention led Aarhus University to initiate a research project entitled What makes Danish TV drama series travel?. Its main hypothesis is that "specific transformations and value creations are happening at all stages in the production of several Danish TV drama series".

== Selected series ==
- Huset på Christianshavn (literally: The House in Christianshavn) is a Danish TV series consisting of 84 episodes originally broadcast between 1970 and 1977. Produced by the Nordisk Film company for the TV station DR, it tells the story of interactions between a number of families living in the Christianshavn neighbourhood of central Copenhagen. It was directed by Ebbe Langberg and Tom Hedegaard.
- Matador is a TV series produced by DR between 1978 and 1981. Directed by Erik Balling, it was the idea of author Lise Nørgaard who wrote the bulk of the episodes alongside Karen Smith, Jens Louis Petersen and Paul Hammerich. Set in the fictional Danish town of Korsbæk between 1929 and 1947, the series follows the lives of various characters in the town before and after the German occupation, especially the rivalry between banker Hans Christian Varnæs and upcoming businessman Mads (Andersen-)Skjern. The distinctive theme tune of the series was composed by Bent Fabricius-Bjerre. Matador originally aired on DR between November 1978 and January 1982, but has enjoyed repeated successful reruns in 1984-85, 1989–90, 1997–98 and 2006-07.
- TAXA is a series in 56 episodes produced by DR and written by Stig Thorsboe. First broadcast on 14 September 1997, the action revolves around a taxi central in Copenhagen. The series was a huge success from the first episode.
- Strisser på Samsø (The Cops of Samsø) is a series in 12 episodes written and directed by Eddie Thomas Petersen. Produced by Nordisk Film, it was first broadcast on TV2 in 1997-1998. The story tells how Christian Top who has lost his wife in an unsuccessful robbery brings his daughter Sille to the island of Samsø. They have difficulty in integrating into a society where everyone knows everything about everybody but they find a friend in Ulla, a secretary.
- Ørnen: En krimi-odyssé (The Eagle: A Crime Odyssey) (2004) is a series in 24 episodes produced by DR, written by Peter Thorsboe and Mai Brostrøm and directed by Jannik Johansen and Søren Kragh-Jacobsen, in which The Eagle (Ørnen), an Icelandic inspector in the Danish police force, heads a new task force to help solve international crime. The series won an International Emmy Award from The International Academy of Television, Arts and Science for best non-American television drama series in 2005.
- Krøniken is a Danish Broadcasting Corporation (DR) drama series in 22 episodes written by Stig Thorsboe and Hanna Lundblad. It was broadcast in four stages between 2004 and 2007. The principal producers were Charlotte Sieling and Henrik Ruben Genz. Starting in 1949, the series follows four young Danes through 25 years of history and personal development in a story about finding yourself in a world of changes.
- Anna Pihl (2006-2008) is a Danish police drama produced by TV2 starring Charlotte Munck and Iben Hjejle. It consists of three sets of 10 episodes. Anna Pihl, a policewoman at the Bellahøj police station in Denmark's capital, Copenhagen, is divorced, and lives with her son, Mikkel, in a flat shared with Jan, her gay male friend. The series focuses on personal stories and realism combined with action and suspense.
- Sommer (2008) is a Danish Broadcasting Corporation (DR) drama series in 20 episodes written by Jesper W. Nielsen and Karina Dam. The actors include Jesper Langberg, Lisbet Dahl, Mikael Birkkjær and Lars Ranthe. It traces the story of a doctor who falls ill and has to give up his practice. His wife and two sons have to cope with the difficulties which ensue.
- Borgen (2010-2013) is a Danish Broadcasting Corporation (DR) political drama which tells the story of a charismatic politician, Birgitte Nyborg (played by Sidse Babett Knudsen), who unexpectedly becomes the first female Prime Minister of Denmark.
- Forbrydelsen (The Killing, 2007-2012) is a police procedural television drama series produced by the Danish Broadcasting Corporation (DR), starring Sofie Gråbøl who plays Detective Inspector Sarah Lund of a fictional version of the Copenhagen police department. Each series follows a day-by-day investigation of a specific murder case. As of 2012, there have been three series of the show, comprising 40 episodes (20 in the first series, and 10 in the second and third). The series has also spawned an American remake (2011-2014).
- The Bridge (Broen, 2011–2018) is a crime drama television series co-produced by Danmarks Radio (Danish Broadcasting Corporation) and Sveriges Television. There have been four series of the show, comprising 10 episodes in the first three series.and eight episodes in the fourth The series follows a police investigation following the discovery of a dead body on the bridge connecting Denmark and Sweden. The series has also spawned an American remake, also called The Bridge (2013-2014), and a British-French series called The Tunnel (2013–2017).

=== Mini series ===
- Riget (The Kingdom) (1994) was a mini series created by film director and co-founder of the Dogme 95 movement Lars von Trier set in a haunted hospital. The series was later remade by Stephen King for American television under the name Kingdom Hospital, and also inspired the British spoof series Garth Marenghi's Darkplace. The show's combination of surrealism and soap opera-like plotting earned comparisons to David Lynch's cult series Twin Peaks.
- Edderkoppen (The Spider) (2000) is a mini series of six one-hour episodes collaboratively written and developed by Thomas Heinesen, Lars Kjeldgård, Birgit Olsen, Ebbe Kløvedal Reich, Lars Andersen, Ole Christian Madsen, Nikolaj Scherfig and directed by Ole Christian Madsen. It is a dramatization based on the unravelling of a criminal syndicate in Copenhagen in the post war era of 1949-50 and the series was made for the DR national public TV Channel. Edderkoppesagen (The Spider Case) was a real criminal syndicate case in Copenhagen around the time, but the series are fictional to a large extent. The series were aired for the first time in March 2000 and was a huge success with 1-1.5 million Danish viewers. The series has been sold to many countries around the world.
- Unge Andersen (Young Andersen) (2005) is a mini series in two episodes written by Rumle Hammerich and Ulf Stark and directed by Hammerich. It describes the formative boarding school years of Hans Christian Andersen.

== See also ==
- Television in Denmark
- List of television stations in Denmark
