= MTV (Denmark) =

Danish television channel

MTV Denmark
- Final logo used from 1 July 2011 to 22 February 2019
- Country: Denmark
- Broadcast area: Denmark

Ownership
- Owner: ViacomCBS Networks EMEAA
- Sister channels: VH1 Denmark

History
- Launched: May 2005; 21 years ago
- Replaced: MTV Nordic
- Closed: 22 February 2019; 7 years ago
- Replaced by: MTV Nordic

Links
- Website: www.mtv.dk

Screenshot of MTV Denmark in 2007-2009 02

First logo of MTV Denmark

MTV Denmark was a music and entertainment channel broadcasting to the Danish market.

The channel replaced MTV Nordic in May, 2005, however on February 22, 2019, it was replaced by the return of MTV Nordic.

== History ==
- The channel started in May 2005 as part of MTV's expansion into the Nordic region, which followed with launches of MTV Finland, MTV Sweden, and MTV Norway in September 2005. Before the start of country-specific channels, Denmark, Sweden, Norway, and Finland had been served by a common channel called MTV Nordic, launched on 5 June 1998 to replace the MTV Europe feed.
- The channel was broadcast from the MTV Networks Europe headquarters in London, along with other MTV channels i.e. MTV Sweden. As of 2011, MTV Denmark is broadcast from its operations in Stockholm.
- On February 22, 2019, the local MTV channels for the Nordic region were replaced by the relaunch of MTV Nordic which features no advertising or sponsorships. Despite this, separate websites still exist for the local languages.

== Availability ==
- MTV Denmark was available from virtually all major television distributors in Denmark. Most cable networks carry the channel in their basic packages.
- It also had a radio network called MTV Radio that launched on November 1, 2019, and was available online, in DAB+ and on 98.6 MHz in Zealand. It got replaced by ENERGY at early 2021.

== Former local shows ==
During the days of MTV Nordic, languages other than English were rarely spoken on MTV in Denmark. With the start of MTV Denmark, several Danish language programmes were produced. These include:

- Fusion Chart, a daily top 10 chart
- Headbangers Ball
- MTV News
- Spanking New
- Transistor (Daily Live Request Show)

== Former presenters (VJs) ==
- Christine Roloff
- Freya Christine Clausen
