= Sangasar =

- Town
- Sangasar (Iraq)
- Interactive map of Sangasar
- Coordinates: 36.247301°N 45.006628°E
- Country: Iraq

Sangasar (Sorani Kurdish: سەنگەسەر) is a small market town in Iraqi Kurdistan, around 110 km East of Erbil and 120 km North of Sulaymaniyah.

in the late 1980s, Saddam Hussein forcibly displaced the inhabitants of the town as part of a plan to evict Kurdish people from the Eastern border with Iran.

In 2007, 1,800 people were internally displaced from Sangasar and from Doli Shahidan in Erbil Governorate due to Turkish shelling. According to ReliefWeb, "One woman was reported killed and several people injured. Over 200 head of livestock have also been killed. One mukhtar - head of a local village - told us six bridges which connect several villages had been destroyed, as well as a local school."

In 2017 a small earthquake took place in the Sangasar area of Iraqi Kurdistan, resulting in no casualties.

In 2019, the area has been repeatedly targeted by Turkish bombing, resulting in numerous civilian casualties. Nahro Abdullah, the Mayor of Sangasar, reportedly told Kurdistan 24 that Turkish bombing in their area has increased in 2019 in comparison with previous years. Rudaw also reported that Turkish warplanes bombed Sarginel village, which is about 15 km north of Sangasar, in November 2019. Mayor Nahro Abdullah told Rudaw that "The Turkish warplanes bombed Sarginel village six times". Turkey has claimed that it is targeting PKK militants in the area. However, local villagers have told Kurdish news agencies that there are no PKK bases in the area.

Kurdish singer and TV presenter Daniel Madland was born in Sangasar.
