= MTV (Nordic) =

English-language Nordic cable TV network

MTV Nordic
- Final logo used from February 22, 2019 to February 1, 2021
- Broadcast area: Europe (original); Denmark; Finland; Norway; Sweden (re-launch); Faroe Islands
- Headquarters: Stockholm, Sweden; London, UK

Ownership
- Owner: ViacomCBS Networks EMEAA

History
- Launched: 5 June 1998; 28 years ago (original); February 22, 2019 (re-launch)
- Replaced: MTV Europe
- Closed: 17 September 2005; 21 years ago (original); February 1, 2021; (re-launch)
- Replaced by: MTV Sweden; MTV Denmark; MTV Norway; MTV Finland (original); MTV Europe (relaunch)

Links
- Website: nordic.mtve.com (original)

Logo used from launch on 5 June 1998 until 17 September 2005

MTV Nordic was a 24-hour English-language Nordic cable television network owned by ViacomCBS Networks EMEAA that was active from 5 June 1998 to 1 February 2021.

Between 1998 and 2006, MTV Nordic served the majority of European territories that did not have their own localized MTV channel under the branding MTV Europe & Nordic. The majority of programming was hosted by presenters from the Nordic countries, mainly Sweden, Denmark and Norway. Additional video jockeys came from Israel, United States, Ireland and the United Kingdom. The channel gradually began to localize in May 2005 with the launch of MTV Denmark and in September 2005, the launch of MTV Sweden, MTV Norway and MTV Finland, which resulted in the MTV Nordic ceasing as a brand.

On 22 February 2019, the local MTV channels for the Nordic region were replaced by the relaunch of MTV Nordic which features no advertising or sponsorships. Despite this, separate social media accounts and websites still exist for the local languages.

In early 2020, MTV Nordic as a branding began to reappear on MTV's social media sites within the Nordic region.

On 1 February 2021, MTV Nordic was replaced with MTV Europe (now MTV Global), along with MTV China and Comedy Central (Southeast Asia).

== Programming ==
- 16 and Pregnant
- 90's House
- Amazingness
- Are You the One?
- Are You the One? Second Chances
- Awkward
- Car Crash Couples
- Catfish: The TV Show
- Catfish: Trolls
- Celebrity Ex on the Beach
- Double Shot at Love
- Ex on the Beach
- Ex on the Beach US
- Ex on the Beach: Body SOS
- Faking It
- Families of the Mafia
- Floribama Shore
- How Far Is Tattoo Far?
- Game of Clones
- Geordie OGs
- Geordie Shore
- Geordie Shore: Their Story
- The Hills
- The Hills: New Beginnings
- Jersey Shore
- Jersey Shore: Family Vacation
- Just Tattoo of Us
- Lindsay Lohan's Beach Club
- Million Dollar Baby
- MTV Breakfast Club
- MTV Night Videos
- MTV Push
- My Super Sweet 16
- Promposal
- Revenge Prank
- Ridiculousness
- Siesta Key
- Single AF
- Spring Break with Grandad
- Suspect
- Teen Mom 2
- Teen Mom 3
- Teen Mom OG
- Teen Mom UK

=== Original version ===
- 3 from 1 on the Web
- Alternative Nation
- Axl Meets
- Bytesize
- Chill Out Zone
- Dancefloor Chart
- Data Videos
- Don't Stop the Music
- Euro Top 20
- Hitlist UK
- Most Selected
- MTV Amour
- MTV at the Movies
- MTV Hot
- MTV:New
- MTV News
- MTV News Weekend Edition
- MTV Nordic Top 40
- MTV Summer Festivals
- Non-Stop Hits
- Nordic Top 5
- Select MTV
- Spanking New
- Stylissimo
- Superrock
- This Is Our Music
- This Is the New Sh*t
- Top Selection
- Total Request
- Up North
- US Top 20

== Presenters ==
=== Original version ===
- Eden Harel (1994–2002) European Top 20, Select MTV, Dancefloor Chart
- Lars Beckung mtv:new
- Axl Smith (2004-) Spanking New, Axl Meets, MTV News, MTV At The Festivals,
- Thomas Madvig
- Maria Guzenina
- Vanessa Warwick Headbangers Ball
- Rebecca De Ruvo Awake on the Wild Side, Dial MTV
- Camila Raznovich (1995–1998) MTV Amour, Hangin' Out, MTV Summer Festivals, MTV Beach House
- Cat Deeley (1997–2002) Hit List UK, Stylissimo, MTV News
- Julia Valet Superock, MTV Hot
- Trevor Nelson The Lick
- Becky Griffin Dancefloor Chart
- Neil Cole European Top 20, Select MTV, The Fridge
- Joanne Colan European Top 20
- Kicki Berg Select MTV, European Top 20, Nordic Top 5, MTV Supermercado
- Ulrika Eriksson Hitlist UK, Select MTV
- Ina Géraldine (2003–2004) Euro Top 20
- Amelia Hoy (2004–2006) Euro Top 20
- DP Fitzgerald MTV News Update
- Jason Danino-Holt (2006) Switched On
- Charlotte Thorstvedt (2006–2009) Euro Top 20
- Trey Farley Select MTV
- Katja Schuurman So 90's

== See also ==
- List of MTV Europe VJs
- MTV Denmark
- MTV Finland
- MTV Norway
- MTV Sweden
- MTV Networks Baltic
- MTV Europe
