= Disney XD (Scandinavia) =

- Final logo used from 1 September 2015 to 31 December 2020
- Country: United Kingdom
- Broadcast area: Sweden; Denmark; Norway; Finland; Faroe Islands; Iceland
- Headquarters: London, United Kingdom

Programming
- Languages: English; Danish; Norwegian; Swedish; Finnish (subtitles for most TV shows, continuity and bumpers in English); Russian (continuity in English and bumpers in Swedish)
- Picture format: 16:9 576i SDTV

Ownership
- Sister channels: Disney Channel; Disney Junior (2011–2024)

History
- Launched: 12 September 2009; 17 years ago
- Closed: 31 December 2020; 5 years ago
- Replaced by: Disney Channel (programming)

Disney XD was a British-managed children's channel offered in the Nordic countries that broadcast 16 hours a day, between 6:00 am and 10:00 pm CET. It replaced Jetix and Toon Disney on 12 September 2009. Jetix used to end its broadcast daily at 6:00 pm. Disney XD was funded by advertising, as was Jetix, while Toon Disney was commercial-free.

Much of the distribution used by the two former channels was taken over by Disney XD. This includes the analogue frequency in YouSee's cable network, previously used by Jetix and Hallmark Channel. The channel was also available terrestrially in Denmark from 1 November 2009, via the Boxer platform. Jetix was granted a license to broadcast terrestrially in Sweden in March 2008, but were yet to use it due to transmission disputes.

The channel was shut down on 31 December 2020, simultaneously with the discontinuation of the Southeast Asian and Middle Eastern versions of the channel. Much of the channel's programming has been moved to Disney Channel and/or Disney+.

== Programming ==
The programming of Disney XD initially included some series that were previously broadcast on Toon Disney and Jetix, but its scope had since then been extended to also include live-action series such as Aaron Stone and feature films. Series carried over from Jetix included Pokémon Battle Dimension, Galactik Football, Dinosaur King, Jimmy Two-Shoes, and Kid vs. Kat. The first program aired on Disney XD was The Legend of Tarzan. The first film aired was Ratatouille. Series from Disney Channel were also aired.

In the channel's final months of broadcast, its programming consisted primarily of various animated shows from Disney Television Animation such as Phineas and Ferb, Big City Greens, Amphibia, Gravity Falls, Star vs. the Forces of Evil, Big Hero 6: The Series and DuckTales, but also included programs like Spider-Man, EU and UK productions such as Dude, That's My Ghost! and Counterfeit Cat, and selected live-action programs such as K.C. Undercover and Lab Rats.

=== Films ===
Whenever films were aired on the channel, they were usually shown on weekends, with a few exceptions.
