= Daniel Madland =

Kurdish singer and television host in the Iraqi Kurdistan region

- Born: 5 October 1977 (age 47); Sangasar, Slemani, Iraq
- Genres: Kurdish Pop
- Occupations: Musician; Television Host
- Years active: 2003–present
- Labels: Aramo Media

Daniel Madland is a Kurdish singer and television host in the Iraqi Kurdistan region.

Madland was born in 1977 October 5 in Sangasar, Slemani Governorate, in Iraq. In 1998, Madland moved with his family to Norway, seeking refugee status, due to the prolonged conflict in Iraq. With the start of the Iraq War, Madland returned to Erbil and quickly became a star within the Kurdish community with the release of "Ba Beto" in 2003. He permanently moved back in 2010, and settled in the KRG capital of Erbil. Madland made his first national television appearance in 2009 on Kanal 4's show Evin Jin U Jyan. Due to the popularity of this appearance, he was invited back on the channel, this time on the Aramo Show. With this he established a close relationship with the two Kurdish stars. The 3 started to work on productions for the TV channel Kurdmax, and eventually by 2011 they moved the Evin Jin U Jyan show to the new channel. For two years, Madland was part of the production and directing team that generated the number one entertainment show in the Kurdistan Region according to IPSOS.

In 2013, Madland, along with Evin and Aramo, decided to start their own channel, that would focus on business and entertainment. NET TV was dubbed as the first Kurdish economics channel, going on air from a makeshift studio in Oscar Hotel, in Erbil. In early 2014, Madland became the host of his own show called "Legal Daniel Gorani Ble", every Friday night, inviting singers from Turkey and the Iraqi Kurdistan Region to perform. After the invasion of Mosul by the Islamic State in June 2014, the KRG economy collapsed, leading to Madland changing the direction of the channel from economy to entertainment only. In 2016, the channel moved its studios to Babylon Media's headquarters in Ankara, Erbil. With the move, Madland produced and directed other shows throughout NET TV, leading it to be a top channel in the Kurdish community throughout the world.

== Discography ==
=== Singles ===
- 2003 – Ba Beto
- 2005 – Ka Dlm Pet Da
- 2009 – Kras Zarde
- 2010 – Nazani
- 2013 – Garyar
