= TV 2 Film =

- Country: Denmark
- Broadcast area: Denmark
- Network: TV 2 Denmark
- Headquarters: Copenhagen, Denmark

Programming
- Picture format: 4:3/16:9

Ownership
- Owner: TV 2 Denmark
- Sister channels: TV 2 TV 2 Charlie; TV 2 News; TV 2 Zulu

History
- Launched: 1 November 2005; 20 years ago
- Closed: 9 January 2015; 11 years ago
- Replaced by: TV 2 Sport

Links
- Website: tv2film.dk

Availability

Terrestrial
- Boxer: -

TV 2 Film was a Danish 24-hour two-star movie channel owned by TV 2. The channel aired from 2005 until 2015.

The channel mostly showed American two-star movies. Each movie was shown many times over the course of several days.

== History ==
TV 2 Film was launched on November 1, 2005, at 9 p.m. The first program to air was the Danish feature film The Green Butchers. The channel was developed from a film strand on TV 2 called "en go' film uden afbrydelser" ("A good movie without interruptions"). Initially, the channel carried advertising between the films, but this practise was discontinued in 2007 as the advertising sales had remained modest.

In August 2008, the channel started broadcasting in the widescreen format. This was followed by the launch of a high-definition simulcast of the channel on January 1, 2009.

On satellite, TV 2 Film (as well as TV 2 Charlie) was initially exclusively available via Canal Digital. The competing Viasat platform started broadcasting the channels in January 2009. From 1 November 2009, the channel also became available terrestrially (via Viaccess-technology by Boxer-approved digital boxes and cards), the same date as Denmark closed down all analogue terrestrial broadcasting and started up DVB-T and MPEG2/MPEG4 digital terrestrial broadcasting. Since then, DVB-T2 was introduced for HD and TV2 Film is now terrestrially broadcast both as HD (through DVB-T2 & MPEG4) and SD (through DVB-T and MPEG4).

In January 2012, the channel was dropped by Denmark's leading cable provider YouSee after they failed to agree on pricing and conditions. The penetration dropped further in January 2013, when Viasat dropped TV 2 Film. After that, the channel would only be available via Canal Digital, Boxer, Stofa and smaller IPTV and cable providers.

In August 2014, TV 2 announced that TV 2 Film was to be closed down and replaced by a then unnamed sports channel in early 2015.
