= YouSee =

Danish telecommunications provider

- Formerly: Tele Danmark Kabel TV; TDC Kabel TV; OnCable
- Founded: 1995; 31 years ago
- Headquarters: Copenhagen, Denmark
- Area served: Denmark
- Parent: TDC Brands
- Website: yousee.dk

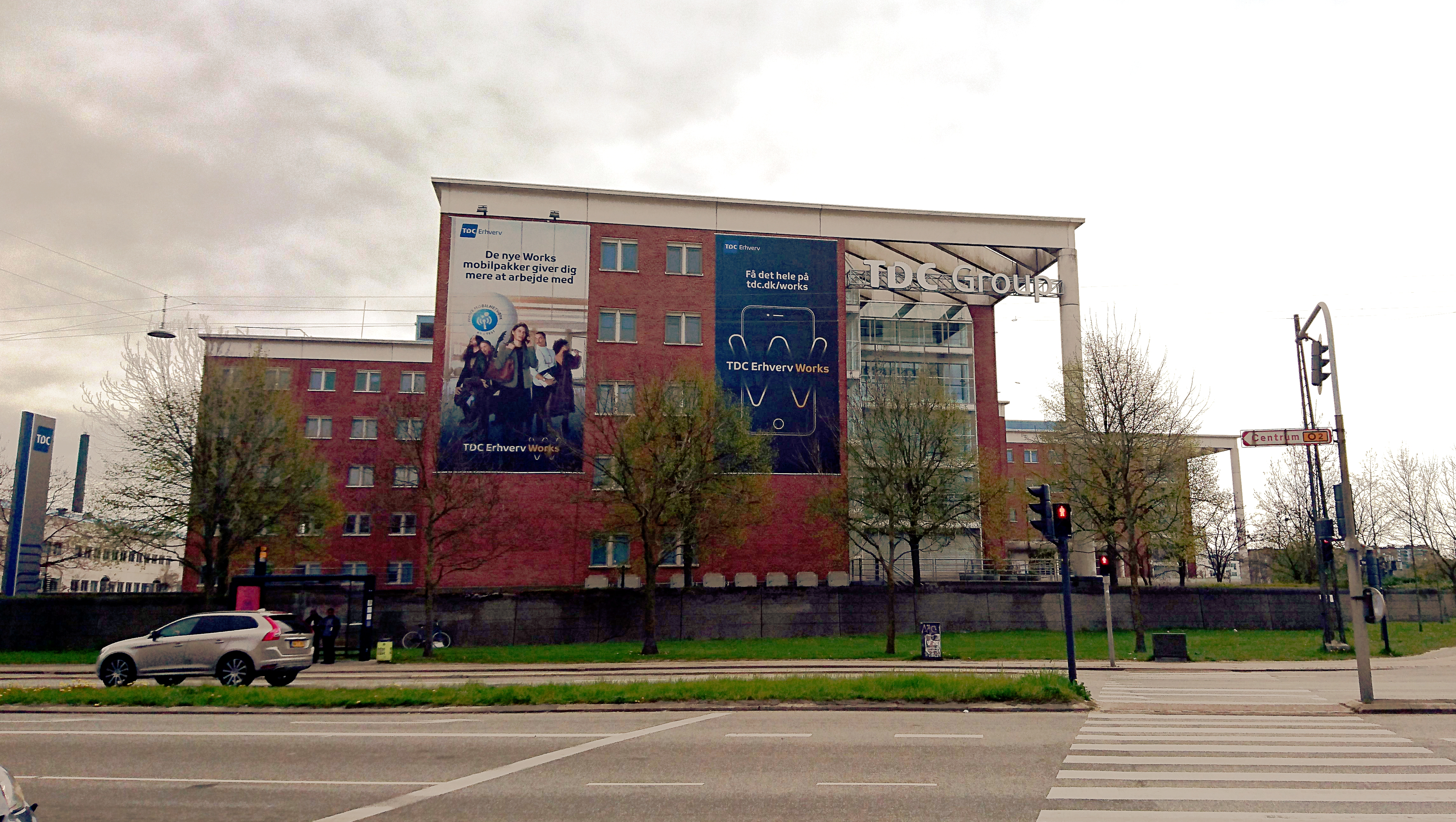
TDC Group & YouSee headquarters in Sydhavnen, Copenhagen

YouSee is the largest quadruple play service provider in Denmark, and is a part of TDC Brands which is a spun-off company from TDC Group, the largest telecommunications company in Denmark which was split into two separate companies. YouSee currently has 784,000 customers, down from its peak of 1.4 million in 2015.

== Background ==
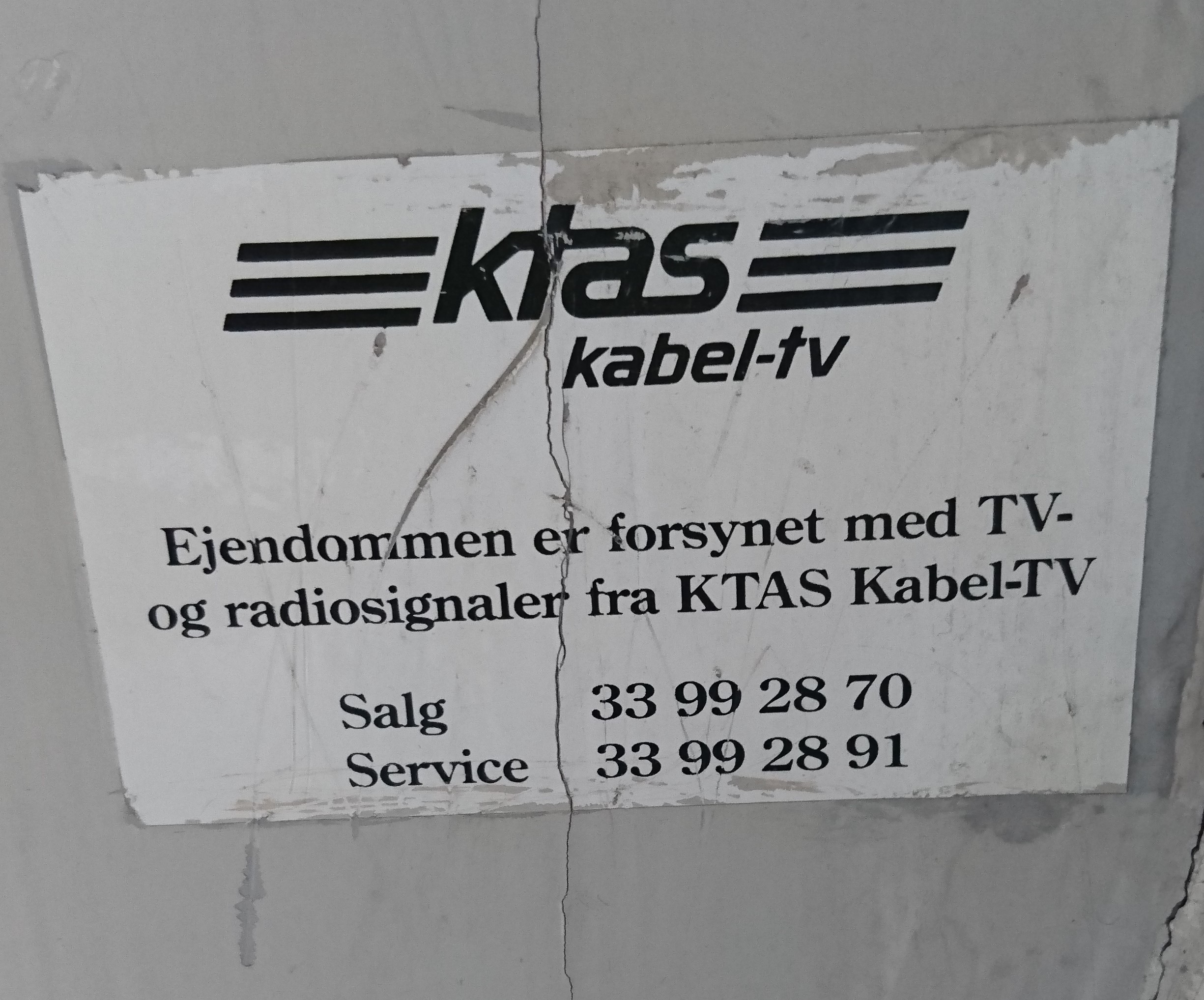
Old sign from the former regional telephone company, KTAS, indicating that the building is connected with TV- and radio signals from KTAS

In 1963, the Danish regional telephone company Jydsk Telefon found an interest in cable television, but only in 1985 did the Folketing give permission for the regional companies to build a nationwide cable TV infrastructure. In November 1990, the Folketing passed a law that paved the way for a nationwide Danish telecom. The company was named Tele Danmark and was the parent company for the existing regional companies (KTAS, Jydsk Telefon, Tele Sønderjylland, Fyns Telefon, and Rigstelefonen).

In 1995, the regional companies were merged into Tele Danmark, and the first nationwide cable TV company, Tele Danmark Kabel TV was created. Five years later, in 2000, Tele Danmark changed its name to TDC, and thus Tele Danmark Kabel TV became TDC Kabel TV. In early 2001 TDC Kabel TV changed its brand name to OnCable as a way for consumers to know they could get more than just TV. This brand name was scrapped in October the following year, reverting to TDC Kabel TV.

In 2007, TDC folded its subsidiaries back into the parent company with the exception of TDC Kabel TV, which continued as an independent legal identity. Later in the year, on 1 October 2007, TDC Kabel TV changed its name to YouSee to once again signal a focus on more than just TV.

On 1 July 2016, the TDC consumer business was merged with YouSee, migrating the entire TDC customer base of IPTV, broadband and mobile consumers to YouSee. The mobile phone network continues to use the 'TDC' name, as its built by TDC Group instead of YouSee.

On 1 August 2018, TDC Group split its business into two units: NetCo and OpCo. YouSee was moved to the latter, which would focus on digital services and customer experiences. In March 2019 OpCo changed its name to Nuuday, and in June 2019 Nuuday was legally separated from TDC NetCo to fully be its own subsidiary of TDC Group.

YouSee formerly had a flanker brand called Fullrate, which existed from 2005 until 2020. It had initially been established by former employees of Cybercity. Fullrate made use of the ADSL2+ with Annex M technology for their lowest-speed services and VDSL2 for higher speeds. On 20 January 2020 TDC announced that their low-cost brand and mobile virtual network operator Fullrate would be shut down and the customers be migrated into YouSee.

On 31 December 2021, TDC A/S became a holding company with no employees. The two companies, TDC Net A/S and Nuuday A/S, became two separate and independent companies.

On 8 April 2026, parent company Nuuday changed its name to TDC Brands to signify relationship with TDC Group.

=== Management ===
CEOs

- Christian Morgan (since August 2021)
- Jacob Mortensen (August 2018–August 2021)
- Jaap Postma (May 2016–July 2018)
- Rene Brøchner Nielsen (2014–2016)

== Services ==
=== YouSee Broadband ===
YouSee has offered internet via cable television since building a return path (using DOCSIS) on the network in the years 2000-2002. It had previously been marketed under the name Webspeed, but was re-branded as YouSee Broadband in 2007.

Today YouSee continues to serve broadband to consumers either via coaxial cable and optical fiber.

Prior to April 2016, customers had to subscribe to at least the basic TV channel package to get broadband over cable. This requirement was removed after parent company TDC was forced by the authorities to allow other broadband companies to serve broadband to consumers using the TDC/YouSee infrastructure without the consumer having to have a TV package from YouSee.

In 2012, YouSee began offering 100 Mbit/s download speeds. Four years later, in 2016, 300 Mbit/s was introduced as the top download speed. Also in 2016, YouSee started a nationwide upgrade of their broadband infrastructure in a partnership with Huawei. The upgrade enables gigabit download speeds by deploying DOCSIS 3.1 nationwide, and is expected to be completed by the end of 2017. Later in 2016 an upgrade of the copper broadband network was announced in partnership with Nokia enabling up to 300 Mbit/s speeds (using Vplus) depending on the distance between the household and the nearest cabinet. On 8 May 2017 YouSee began offering 1000 Mbit/s download speeds in the areas where DOCSIS 3.1 had been deployed. On 30 June 2021 YouSee introduced 2500/2500 Mbit/s as the top speed on the fiber network of sister company TDC Net.

In 2024, it was announced that the old copper infrastructure would gradually shut down starting that year, with a planned completion in 2030, marking the end of DSL internet.

==== Current internet tiers ====
As of September 2025:

===== Coax =====
Download speed	Upload speed
200 Mbit/s	200 Mbit/s
1000 Mbit/s	500 Mbit/s
2000 Mbit/s	500 Mbit/s

===== Fiber =====
Download speed	Upload speed
100 Mbit/s	100 Mbit/s
200 Mbit/s	200 Mbit/s
1000 Mbit/s	1000 Mbit/s
2500 Mbit/s	2500 Mbit/s

Speeds are given in megabits per second, where 1 megabit = 0.125 megabytes = 125000 bytes.

==== Cable modems ====
Current and previous cable modems from YouSee

Maker	Model	Protocol	Notes
SAGEMCOM	F@ST 3890v3	DOCSIS 3.1	
SAGEMCOM	F@ST 3890v2	DOCSIS 3.1	
SAGEMCOM	F@ST 3890	DOCSIS 3.1	Discontinued
SAGEMCOM	F@ST 3686 v2	DOCSIS 3.0	Discontinued
SAGEMCOM	F@ST 3686 v1	DOCSIS 3.0	Discontinued
Netgear	C6250EMR	DOCSIS 3.0	Discontinued
Netgear	CG3700	DOCSIS 3.0	Discontinued
Netgear	CG3200	DOCSIS 3.0	Discontinued
Netgear	CG3000	DOCSIS 3.0	Discontinued
Netgear	CG2000	DOCSIS 2.0	Discontinued
Netgear	CVG824G	DOCSIS 2.0	Discontinued
Scientific Atlanta	Webstar DPC 2203	DOCSIS 2.0	Discontinued
Scientific Atlanta	Webstar DPX 2203	DOCSIS 2.0	Discontinued
Motorola	SB5101	DOCSIS 2.0	Discontinued
Motorola	SB5100	DOCSIS 2.0	Discontinued
Motorola	SB4200	DOCSIS 1.1	Discontinued

=== YouSee TV ===
On 15 September 2009, YouSee decided to unencrypt its digital TV distribution, under the marketing name YouSee Clear. However, a parallel analogue distribution was maintained for customers with TV sets that were unable to receive digital signals. At the time YouSee distributed channels in both MPEG-2 and MPEG-4, but in April 2013 YouSee stopped this simulcasting to focus on MPEG-4 only. The name YouSee Clear was used until 1 July 2014 when it was renamed YouSee Tv.

The analogue TV signal was finally switched off on 9 February 2016.

In early 2017, YouSee switched off their cable radio services, which had been used to redistribute several Danish and foreign FM radio stations. YouSee had however continued to provide radio service via the DVB-C signal and via their set-top box – this was discontinued on 30 December 2020.

Today, YouSee broadcasts digital television over coaxial cable and optical fiber using DVB-C and MPEG-4. YouSee also offers IPTV over coaxial cable, optical fiber and copper telephone cables.

The main products have for a long time been the three packages: Basic, Medium and Full.

In October 2011, YouSee, did, however launch a new service called "Extra channels" where consumers could buy channels separately if the consumer subscribes to at least the basic package, and buy at least four extra channels. This four-channel minimum criterion was scrapped in July 2013.

In March 2014, YouSee launched a new "pick-and-mix" service called "Bland-selv" through which customers could subscribe to the medium or full package, but replace the channels with ones of their own choosing. For example, the medium package at the time contained 10 more channels than the basic package, making the customer able to choose 10 channels on top of the basic package. This “pick-and-mix” service based on the traditional packages were replaced in early 2018 with a new point-based system where customers still has to subscribe to the Basic package but then buy 10, 20 or 36 “points”. These points can then be used on TV channels and/or streaming services which can then be viewed via YouSee’s set-top box or online. Any TV channel costs 1 point, and streaming services costs between 3 and 6 points. Customers can replace the channels and streaming services on a monthly basis.

In early 2020, YouSee announced their plans to scrap the long-lived medium and full packages in order to make the "pick-and-mix" service the standard, also indicating that the Basic package will be scrapped in the future, giving the consumers complete control over which channels they pay for. This came to fruition on 1 September 2022, when YouSee re-used the name YouSee Play for a service which doesn't include a basic package but gives consumers complete choice over which channels they subscribe to. The Basic, Medium and Full packages are still available, and the new YouSee Play is only offered via the Internet, not via DVB-C.

In August 2019, YouSee started distributing their first 4K Ultra HD channel, Viasat Ultra HD.

As of January 2021, YouSee offers 80 channels, of which 63 are in HD.

==== Set-top boxes ====
The newest set-top box is a YouSee branded Humax set-top box.

Current and former set-top boxes:

Generation	Released	Maker	Model	Notes
7	Unknown	Humax	YSR-5000	
6	8 January 2018	Humax	YSR-4000	
5	18 April 2016	Humax	YSR-2000	Discontinued
4	2008	Samsung	SMT-H3126	Discontinued
3	2006	Sagem	ICD 60	Discontinued
2	2003	Sagem	ICD 4210	Discontinued
1	1997-1999	Sagem	ICD 3000	Discontinued

==== Current channel packages ====
As of January 2026.

EPG No.	Channel	In HD	In 4K UHD	Package
1	DR1	Yes		Basic
2	TV 2	Yes		Basic
3	TV 3	Yes		Basic
4	See	Yes		Basic
5	DR2	Yes		Basic
6	TV 2 Echo	Yes		Medium
7	TV 2 Charlie	Yes		Basic
8	TV 2 News	Yes		Basic
9	TV3+	Yes		Medium
10	TV3 Puls	Yes		Basic
11	Kanal 5	Yes		Basic
12	TV 2 Fri	Yes		Medium
13	YouSee Info Channel	Yes		Basic
14	TV3 Sport	Yes		Medium
15	TV3 MAX	Yes		Medium
16	TV 2 Sport	Yes		Medium
17	V Sport News	Yes		Basic
18	V Sport Golf	Yes		Full
20	BBC Nordic	Yes		Full
21	Kanal 4	Yes		Basic
22	V Sport Ultra HD		Yes	Medium
23	dk4	Yes		Basic
24	MTV	Yes		Full
25	TV 2 Regional	Yes		Basic
26	National Geographic Channel	Yes		Full
27	DR Ramasjang	Yes		Basic
28	Disney Channel	Yes		Medium
29	Nicktoons	No		Medium
30	Cartoon Network	No		Full
31	Nickelodeon	Yes		Medium
34	Cartoonito	No		Full
35	Nick Jr.	No		Medium
38	SkyShowtime 1	Yes		Full
39	SkyShowtime 2	Yes		Full
41	Viaplay Sport 1	Yes		Full
42	Viaplay Sport 2	Yes		Full
43	Viaplay Sport 3	Yes		Full
44	V Series	Yes		Full
45	V Film Premiere	Yes		Full
46	V Film Family	No		Full
47	V Film Action	Yes		Full
48	V Film Hits	Yes		Full
50	Nat Geo Wild	Yes		Full
51	TV2 Sport X	Yes		Full
52	BBC News	No		Full
53	CNN	No		Full
81	TV 2 Regional	Yes		Basic
87	SVT1	Yes		Basic
88	SVT2	Yes		Basic
89	TV4	Yes		Basic
90	NRK1	Yes		Basic
91	Das Erste	Yes		Basic
92	ZDF	Yes		Basic
93	NDR Fernsehen	Yes		Basic
94	RTL	Yes		Basic
95	Folketing Channel	Yes		Basic
96	Local TV	No		Basic
100	YouSee Event Channel	Yes		Basic
890	DR1 (audio description)	Yes		Basic
891	DR2 (audio description)	Yes		Basic

=== YouSee Mobile ===
Parent company TDC had in 2011 acquired the mobile virtual network operator Onfone which at the time were using the network of Telenor. After the acquisition, Onfone switched to the TDC mobile network, but were kept as a separate brand until December 2013 where Onfone were re-branded as YouSee Mobile.

The YouSee Mobile service uses the network of sister company, TDC Net. This network covers 99.5% of Denmark using 2G, 4G and 5G.

It was announced in September 2013 that Huawei would do a complete overhaul of the 3G and 4G network infrastructure, starting on 1 March 2014 and lasting six years. However, in March 2019, it was announced that Huawei was to be replaced by Ericsson, maintaining the entire network, modernizing the 4G LTE network, and roll-out a nationwide 5G network. The 5G network launched on 7 September 2020. In late 2022 the 3G network was phased out. Nevertheless, the older 2G network is still available.

=== YouSee Mobile Broadband ===
Using the 4G and 5G network of parent company TDC, YouSee offers mobile broadband with included data ranging from 15 GB to 1000 GB.

YouSee started offering 5G mobile broadband services on 11 December 2020.

=== YouSee Telephony ===
TDC Kabel TV started offering IP telephony in 2005 under the Cabletalk brand. This was re-branded as YouSee Telefoni in 2007 as part of the overall YouSee name change.

YouSee continues to offer fixed telephony services using IP as well as traditional landline.

=== Retail stores ===
YouSee now operates 43 stores around the country, after a re-branding of TDC stores to the YouSee brand began in March 2016.

== Discontinued products ==
=== YouBio ===
With the prospect of facing competition from both Netflix and HBO when they announced their streaming services would be available in Denmark late 2012, YouSee announced plans for their own upcoming streaming service. It would be called YouBio (a play on the Danish word for cinema, biograf), and it launched on 7 December 2012.

The service was available as an app on Smart TVs from LG, Samsung, on Android, and iOS. Customers could also buy a separate digital media player YouBio Boks which YouSee had developed.

In June 2014 TDC announced YouBio would become a movie rental service as they couldn't compete with Netflix who had been more successful than TDC had imagined. Later in the year YouBio was shut down completely.

=== YouSee Wifi-Spot ===
In March 2014, a new service called YouSee Wifi-Spot was launched. The idea was to create Wifi hotspots around the country by enabling a second Wifi broadcast on YouSee cable modems. A further 10 Mbit/s speed was added on to participating customers bandwidth as a measure to not have the public wifi hotspot affect the customers own private wifi.

The service was shut down by the end of the month, on 31 March 2014, following incidents of people's files and devices being accessed via security breaches between the public wifi hotspot and the customers own private wifi.

=== YouSee Play ===
YouSee Play was launched on 6 October 2014 as the future of cable TV. It made it possible for customers to watch their TV channel subscriptions on smartphones, smart TVs, tablets and computers.

Less than a year later, on 25 August 2015 YouSee Play was shut down, although the features was carried over to the existing main YouSee TV product.

=== Xee ===
On 20 January 2019 YouSee, together with Fox, launched a TV channel called Xee. In November 2021 the ownership of the channel was transferred to Nordic Entertainment Group, and the channel changed name to See.
