= MTV (Norway) =

Norwegian television station

MTV Norway
- Final logo used from 1 July 2011 to 22 February 2019
- Country: United Kingdom
- Broadcast area: Norway

Ownership
- Owner: ViacomCBS Networks EMEAA

History
- Launched: 18 September 2005; 20 years ago
- Replaced: MTV Nordic
- Closed: 22 February 2019; 7 years ago
- Replaced by: MTV Nordic

Links
- Website: www.mtv.no

MTV Norway was a music and entertainment channel broadcasting to the Norwegian market.

The channel replaced MTV Nordic on September 18, 2005, however on February 22, 2019 it was replaced by the return of MTV Nordic.

== History ==
- MTV Norway launched in September 2005 along with MTV Sweden and MTV Finland. Before the start of country-specific channels, Denmark, Sweden, Norway and Finland had been served by a common channel called MTV Nordic, launched on June 5, 1998 which replaced the MTV Europe feed.
- MTV Norway's offices are based at MTV Networks International's Nordic offices in Stockholm with a local office in Oslo. The channel is broadcast from the MTV Networks Europe headquarters in London and Warsaw.
- During the days of MTV Nordic, languages other than English were rarely spoken on MTV in Norway. With the start of MTV Norway, several Norwegian speaking programmes were produced for example MTV News.
- Since the mid-2000s MTV Norway shares a similar schedule to its other European counterparts featuring mainly reality based content from MTV US and very few music videos.
- Since 2009, MTV Norway's localized content has been reduced this is seen both on-air and on-line. Its website mtv.no is entirely in English where previously it was available in Norwegian. All programming is in English with Norwegian subtitles, with the exception of locally produced programming and local advertising.
- On February 22, 2019, the local MTV channels for the Nordic region were replaced by the relaunch of MTV Nordic which features no advertising or sponsorships. Despite this, separate websites still exist for the local languages.
