= MTV (Sweden) =

MTV Sweden
- Country: Sweden
- Broadcast area: Sweden

Ownership
- Owner: ViacomCBS Networks EMEAA

History
- Launched: 18 September 2005; 20 years ago
- Replaced: MTV Nordic
- Closed: 22 February 2019; 7 years ago
- Replaced by: MTV Nordic

Links
- Website: www.mtv.se

Availability

Terrestrial
- Boxer: Channel 9

MTV Sweden was a music and entertainment channel broadcasting to the Swedish market.

The channel replaced MTV Nordic on September 18, 2005, however on February 22, 2019 it was replaced by the return of MTV Nordic.

== History ==
- MTV Sweden launched in September 2005 along with MTV Finland and MTV Norway. Before the start of country-specific channels, Denmark, Sweden, Norway and Finland had been served by a common channel called MTV Nordic, launched on June 5, 1998 which replaced the MTV Europe feed.
- MTV Sweden's offices are based at Viacom International Media Networks' Nordic offices in Stockholm. The channel is broadcast from the Viacom International Media Networks Europe headquarters in London, partly because of the strict laws on television advertising in Sweden (interrupting programmes for commercials was illegal until 2002).
- During the days of MTV Nordic, languages other than English were rarely spoken on MTV in Sweden. With the start of MTV Sweden, several Swedish language programmes were produced for example MTV News in Swedish and Off Beat.
- Since the mid-2000s MTV Sweden shares a similar schedule to its other European counterparts featuring mainly reality based content from MTV US and very few music videos.
- On February 22, 2019, the local MTV channels for the Nordic region were replaced by the relaunch of MTV Nordic which features no advertising or sponsorships. Despite this, separate websites still exist for the local languages.

== Availability ==
- At its launch MTV Sweden was available on all major digital television providers. Most cable networks carry the channel in their basic packages. It was available on satellite from Canal Digital and Viasat. In 2001, the government granted MTV a license to broadcast on the terrestrial network on the Boxer platform. Since 2006, the overnight programming between 2 and 7 a.m. has been replaced by music videos from VH1 Europe in the terrestrial network.
- In 2010, MTV Networks International signed a new agreement with Com Hem which meant that MTV would be removed from Com Hem's analogue package, losing a sizeable chunk of its reach. MTV was removed from the analogue network on January 15, 2011.

== Former local shows ==
- Celsius, a daily top 10 chart (2004–2006)
- Hej, kom och hjälp mig (English: Hi, come and help me) (2006–2007)
- MTV Beat (September–November 2007)
- MTV Chorus (September–November 2007)
- MTV Fuzz (September–November 2007)
- MTV Phaser (September–November 2007)
- Mycket mer än müsli (English: Much more than muesli) (2006–2007)
- Strössel (English: Sprinkles) (2006–2007)
