= VH1 (Denmark) =

Defunct Danish music TV channel

VH1 Denmark
- Country: Denmark
- Broadcast area: Denmark
- Headquarters: Copenhagen, Denmark

Programming
- Picture format: 576i SDTV

Ownership
- Owner: Paramount Networks EMEAA

History
- Launched: 15 March 2008; 17 years ago
- Replaced: VH1 Europe
- Closed: 1 April 2024; 17 months ago
- Replaced by: NickMusic

Availability

Terrestrial
- Boxer: Channel 32

VH1 was a music channel in Denmark operated by Paramount Networks EMEAA. The channel launched at 22:00 on 15 March 2008, replacing VH1 Europe.

It was the last remaining European version of VH1, following the closure of the Italian version on 7 January 2024, until it closed on 1 April 2024, effectively retiring the brand in Europe.

== Background ==
Before the launch of VH1 Denmark, VH1 was first made available in Denmark through VH1 UK followed by VH1 Export and later VH1 Europe.

== Availability ==
Initially, upon launch, the channel had limited availability. However, YouSee, offered VH1 Denmark as a replacement to the timeshare between the channel's Pan-European equivalent VH1 Europe and the erotic channel Private Blue. The smaller cable network Stofa and Telia also offered the channel upon launch. Both satellite distributors, Canal Digital and Viasat, did not broadcast the Danish channel, continuing their relays of VH1 Europe instead.

From launch, the channel had dedicated Danish programming for the channel including a weekly chart show hosted by the radio personality Dan Rachlin. The channel continues to present a mix of local music along with music from the Nordic countries, US and the UK. Countdown shows, playlist shows and specialist music content.

Upon launch, the channel was broadcasting between 12 p.m. and 6 a.m. In the morning, Nickelodeon was broadcasting instead. At the start of 2009, Nickelodeon began its own frequency in the YouSee network and VH1 up to 20 hours a day with teleshopping making up the remainder of the schedule.

The channel launched on the terrestrial Boxer platform on 1 November 2009.

On 20 March 2024, NickMusic replaced VH1 on YouSee, and it replaced VH1 on other providers on 1 April.

== Presenters ==
- Dan Rachlin (2008-2015)
