= 6'eren =

Danish television channel

- Country: Denmark
- Broadcast area: Denmark

Ownership
- Owner: Warner Bros. Discovery EMEA (Skydance Corporation)
- Sister channels: Kanal 4 Kanal 5 Canal 9

History
- Launched: 1 January 2009
- Replaced: SBS Net

Links
- Website: Official website

Availability

Terrestrial
- Boxer: Channel 10

6'eren is a Danish subscription television channel operated by Warner Bros. Discovery EMEA. It replaced SBS Net on 1 January 2009.

The channel's target audience is males, branding itself with the slogan "Denmark's got a new TV Channel - and it's for men" (Danmark har fået en ny TV-kanal, og den er for mænd). The channel also shows La Liga and FA Cup football. Matches involving Swansea City during the 2013–14 Premier League season were extensively shown on the channel due to Michael Laudrup's time at the club as manager.

Like other terrestrial services distributed in Denmark, 6'eren does not interrupt shows with commercials.

6'eren is distributed through terrestrial, satellite and cable and is available to approximately 75% of all Danish households.

== History ==
The origin of the channel dates back to a 2006 decision taken by SBS. In March of that year, it was announced that TVDanmark would be replaced by a new channel, Kanal 4, aimed at a female demographic. Due to concerns from SBS over the introduction of digital terrestrial television in Denmark, SBS announced that the terrestrial broadcast of Kanal 4 was a temporary measure, and that a new channel would take place the terrestrial transmitter network effective 1 January 2007.

The new channel, SBS NET, was aimed at the 21-50 demographic targeting male viewers more than females, in contrast to Kanal 4, its predecessor. By inheriting the terrestrial network it was the SBS channel with the highest penetration rate in Denmark (75% of households). As with Kanal 4, SBS NET inherited the morning block of cartoons and the local news services from TVDanmark.

== Logos ==
6'eren first logo from 2009 to 2015

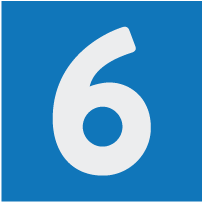
6'eren second logo from 2015 to 2024

== Sports rights ==
=== Football ===
- Danish Superliga
- FA Cup
- Football League Cup
