= Kanal København =

Denmark based Television channel

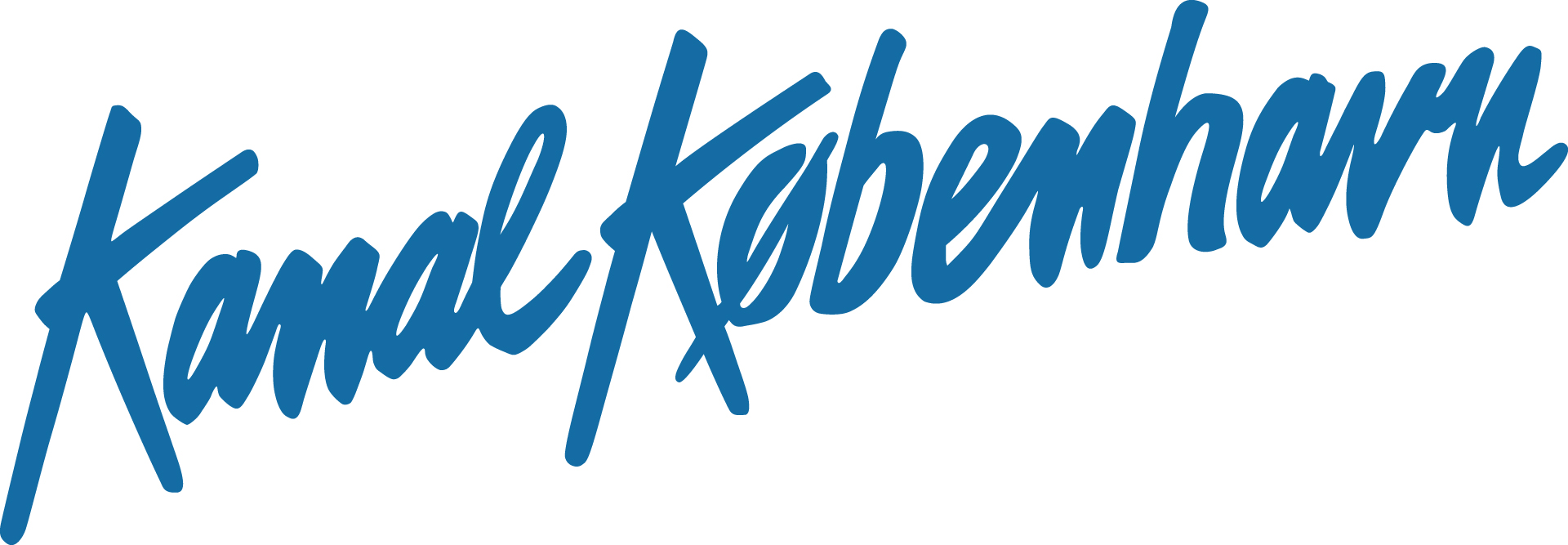
- Industry: Broadcasting
- Founded: 13 October 1984 (Kanal 23); 1 April 1990 (current form)
- Defunct: 26 October 2009
- Headquarters: Copenhagen, Denmark, Denmark
- Area served: Scandinavia
- Key people: Jimmy Rehak
- Services: Television
- Owner: Mediehuset København

Kanal København (Channel Copenhagen) is a Danish commercial television channel, which can be seen in most parts of Denmark. It is a Pay-TV and Cable TV channel delivered by providers like Stofa, Waoo!, Dansk Bredbaand and others. It is quite unusual in that a very high percentage of the programs shown are produced in Denmark and in the Danish language.

== History of Kanal København ==
Kanal København started in 1990 as a replacement for the existing Kanal 23 in the Copenhagen region, originally launched in 1984. It gained popularity with a mixture of programs ranging from entertainment, news, music and eroticism to consumer issues. A turning point was reached in 2004 when the channel reached even more viewers. The broadcast and production company Mediehuset København became responsible of the prime time program schedule and a new air look and graphical design was introduced.

== Programs themes ==
The program schedule of Kanal København can roughly be divided into the following blocks:

5:00pm – 6:00pm: Debate and documentaries, 6:00pm – 8:00pm: Entertainment, 8:00pm – 10:00pm: Cultural programmes, 10:00pm – 12:00am: Entertainment for youths, After 12:00am: Erotic films

== Examples of programs ==
- Mettes Mix: A weekly talkshow for women and men.
- Dansk Top Scenen: A music program with popular Danish music. The oldest program of its kind in Denmark.
- Roniky Comedy Show: A Danish crazy sketch show shown weekly.
- MC MagaCin: The only Danish consumer program about the world of motor bikes.
- En nation i krise – et fællesskab i tomgang: A number of programs about Denmark, the EU and the possibility of reaching the ambitious goals set by the Union for the time up until the year 2020.
- Københavnemiljøer: Programs about quite unknown and interesting small communities in the Copenhagen harbour area.
- Floor Wars: Elite dancers from all over the world participate in this breakdance competition called Floor Wars.
