= Dk4 =

Danish television channel

dk4
- Country: Denmark
- Broadcast area: Denmark
- Headquarters: Copenhagen, Denmark

Programming
- Language: Danish
- Picture format: 576i (16:9 SDTV)

Ownership
- Owner: Tritel

History
- Launched: 1993; 33 years ago

Links
- Website: www.dk4.dk

dk4 is a Danish television channel operated by Tritel.

The channel was launched in 1993. It received the attention of several politicians, because it had live transmissions of the debates in the Folketing (The Danish parlament).

From 2004 to 2006 it had a sister channel 4Sport, but because of hard competition it closed again.

Today the channel shows old Danish movies from the 1930s and 1940s, speedway, basketball and programs about camping. 60% of the Danish population has access to the channel.

Former Minister of Health Torben Lund is the director of the channel.
