= Oliver Bjerrehuus =

Danish model

- Born: Oliver Bjerrehuus; 6 October 1975 (age 51); Copenhagen, Denmark
- Spouse: Anna von Lindholm (?–2003)
- Children: Oscar Bjerrehuus (son) with former girlfriend, Anna von Lindholm. Sigga Dalsgaard (daughter) Hanna Dalsgaard (daughter) Hugo Dalsgaard (son) with former girlfriend, Gunnvør Linda Virgarsdóttir Dalsgaard
- Modeling information
- Height: 6 ft 0 in (1.83 m)
- Hair color: Brown
- Eye color: Blue-Green
- Website: www.oliverbjerrehuus.de.pl

Oliver Bjerrehuus (born 6 October 1975) is a Danish model. He was born in Denmark to actress-turned-writer Suzanne Bjerrehuus. In 1997, Bjerrehuus traveled to New York City, where his career took off when he landed jobs for Calvin Klein, Nautica, and Giorgio Armani. In 2003, Bjerrehuus moved back to Denmark. He is currently an actor in his home country.

== Family and early life ==
Bjerrehuus was born on 6 October 1975 to Suzanne Bjerrehuus and Ole Brøndum in Denmark. Bjerrehuus is very close with his mother, and calls her his "one true love." studied electrical engineering at Aarhus University (Danish: Aarhus Universitet) (abbr.: AU) in Aarhus, Denmark but never graduated because he decided to quit to pursue his modeling career.

== Modeling career ==
A modeling agent discovered Bjerrehuus at age 17 while he was out at a nightclub. He modeled for 5 years in Denmark until he decided to pursue modeling in the United States. He then moved to New York City in 1997 to advance his modeling career. Bjerrehuus has been represented by both Unique Models of Copenhagen and Aarhus and Mega Modeling Agency of Denmark. He has modeled for major fashion editorials and ad campaigns for brands such as, Kenneth Cole, Giorgio Armani, Nautica, Azzaro's "Visti" for men, Peek & Cloppenburg, Malo, Lindeburg, Dolce and Gabbana, and lastly Prada. After 5 years in New York, Bjerrehuus moved back to Denmark in 2003.

== Acting career ==
While Bjerrehuus's modeling career was at its peak, he decided to pursue an acting career as well. Although he didn't find much success at acting in the United States he has reached celebrity status in his home country of Denmark, having appeared in many commercials, TV shows and films.

== Other Ventures ==
In 2002 the actor and model tried bartending for about a month in March at local bar. In 2003, Bjerrehuus became a triple threat when he joined the rock band, "John Century" for whom he played the bass. The musician has played the bass since age 13 and has been inspired by a variety of bands including Red Hot Chili Peppers and Jane's Addiction.

== Personal life ==
He has publicly been affectionate towards both men and woman, but has only had serious relationships with women. Bjerrehuus's first marriage was to Anna von Lindholm, who is a leather-fashion designer and actress. The couple has one son together named Oscar. Now that the two are divorced, Oscar resides with Bjerrehuus. In 2007, Bjerrhuus had his next big relationship with Gunnvør Linda Virgarsdóttir Dalsgaard, a PR advisor who he met at the premiere of his movie The Simpsons (Danish version). The couple broke up on 23 January 2012, but have two daughters together named Sigga Bjerrehuus and Hanna Bjerrehuus. In December 2016, Bjerrehuus and Dalsgaard announced that they are expecting another baby, a son named Hugo, in May 2017.
