= Kanal 5 (Danish TV channel) =

Danish television station

- Country: Denmark
- Broadcast area: Kingdom of Denmark

Ownership
- Owner: Warner Bros. Discovery EMEA (Warner Bros. Discovery)
- Sister channels: Kanal 4; 6'eren Canal 9

History
- Launched: 1 January 2000 (as TV Danmark 1); 4 April 2004 (as Kanal 5)
- Replaced: TV Danmark 1

Links
- Website: Official website

Availability

Terrestrial
- Boxer: Channel 5
- Televarpið: Channel 11

Kanal 5 (transl. Channel 5) is a Danish subscription television channel operated by Warner Bros. Discovery EMEA, a subsidiary of Warner Bros. Discovery. The station is broadcast to Denmark by satellite from London, showing mainly films, American drama shows, and sports.

Kanal 5 is distributed through cable and satellite. Kanal 5 lost a large part of the channel's viewers in 2020 after a dispute with YouSee, which led to the channel disappearing from YouSee's TV packages. Therefore, Kanal 5 is now only received by around 31.6% of Danes.

== History ==
The station was launched on 1 January 2000 as TvDenmark 1, broadcasting via satellite from the UK. During their brief run, TvDenmark 1 and its sister channel, TvDenmark 2, were the worst performing channels in SBS Broadcasting Group's portfolio. Under the direction of a new managing director both channels rebranded and relaunched in April 2004.

On 11 November 2007, Kanal 5 HD was announced as the first national Danish high-definition television channel. The HD channel launched on 1 January 2008. The channel broadcast high-definition simulcasts of Kanal 5, showing material available in HD and true HD, and upscaling the rest of the content.

== Programming ==
Kanal 5 aired the Danish version of So You Think You Can Dance. The channel owns the Danish broadcast rights to show Spanish football from La Primera Division, and along with Canal Digital it shares the rights to show English Premier League football. As of 2007 Kanal 5 had purchased the rights to show the James Bond movies.

=== Self-produced programs on Kanal 5 ===
- Can You Dance or What? (2008–2009)
- Big Brother (2012–2014)
- Singing Stars (2006)
- Denmark's Smartest Child (2006)
- The Kings on Kanal 5 (2011–2015)
- Reportage
- Peking Express (2007)
- Love Me Tonight (2008)
- Wipeout/Winter Wipeout (2009–2012)
- Stand Up (2009)
- Dating in the Dark (2010–2012)
- 4-Star Dinner (2010–2012)
- Total Blackout (2011)
- Police Hunt (2011–present)
- Popstars (2014)
- Voice Junior (2019)
- Crimes That Shook Denmark (2019–now)
- Caught on the Police Camera (2019–present)
- Over the Atlantic (2019–present)
- Reality's Travel Team (2021)
- 5. Gear (2017–present)
- All Together Now - Denmark (2018–2019)
- The Royal Life Guards (2018–2021)

== Logos ==
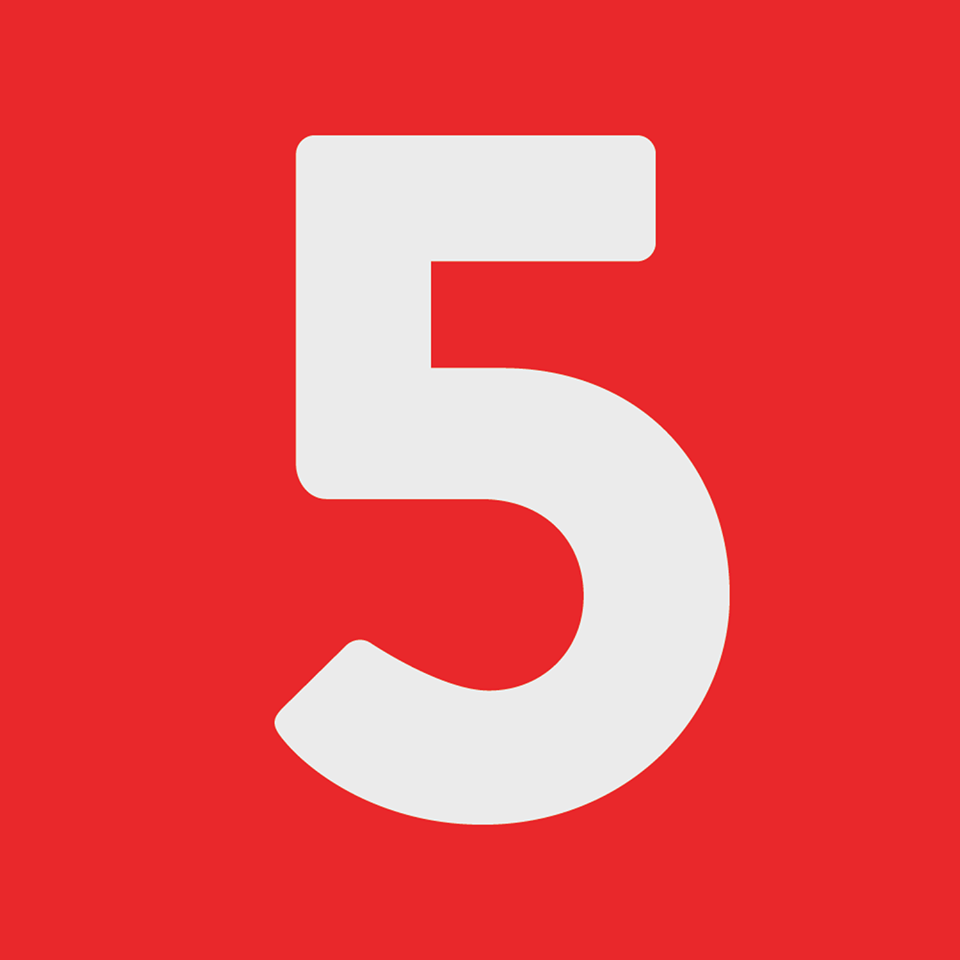
Kanal 5 fourth logo from 2015 to 2024
