= Caroline Fleming =

Danish former Baroness (born 1975)

- Born: Baroness Caroline Elizabeth Ada Iuel-Brockdorff; 9 September 1975 (age 51); Valdemar's Castle, Tåsinge, Svendborg, Denmark
- Occupations: Socialite, media personality, television presenter, author, businesswoman
- Television: Danmarks Næste Topmodel (2010–2014); Ladies of London (2015–2017)
- Spouse: Rory Fleming (m. 2001; div. 2008)
- Partners: Nicklas Bendtner (2009–2011; engaged in 2010); Christian Hostetter (2015); Hervé Larren (2017); Frederik Kølle (2023–present)
- Family: Juel–Brockdorff (paternal)

Caroline Elisabeth Ada Fleming (née Baroness Caroline Elizabeth Ada Iuel-Brockdorff; born 9 September 1975) is a Danish socialite and media personality, who owned Valdemar's Castle until 2014. She is known as the host of the Kanal 4 reality television series Danmarks Næste Topmodel (2010–2014) and as a main cast member on the Bravo reality television series Ladies of London (2015–2017).

== Early life ==
Baroness Caroline Elizabeth Ada Iuel-Brockdorff was born into Danish nobility at Valdemar's Castle on the Danish island of Tåsinge, near Svendborg, in southern Denmark, on 9 September 1975, as the daughter to Baron Niels Krabbe Juel-Brockdorff, a landowner, and his first wife, Baroness Margaretha Juel-Brockdorff (née Lundgren), a socialite. She has a sister. She is the 11th generation of landowners after the naval hero Niels Juel. Her godfather is Count Preben Ahlefeldt Laurvig.

== Career ==
Fleming rose to prominence as the original host on the Kanal 4 reality television series Danmarks Næste Topmodel. After the fifth season, she stepped down as the host of the show.

Fleming has authored two Danish cookbooks, Baronessen går i køkkenet (The Baroness in the Kitchen), and Baronessens sunde fastfood (The Baroness's Heathy Fastfood), both of which were published in 2010. She has authored an English cookbook, Cook Yourself Happy: The Danish Way, which was published in 2017.

Fleming has made a perfume series of "Eau de Vie" and "Eau de Vie: Josephine", the latter of which is named after her daughter.

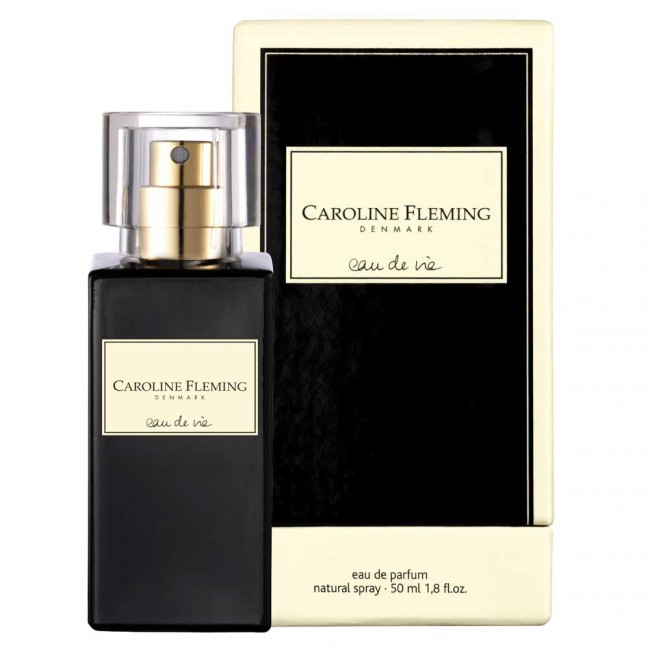
Fleming's "Eau de vie" perfume

Fleming joined the main cast member on the Bravo reality television series Ladies of London for the second season, which premiered on 7 September 2015, with Juliet Angus, Marissa Hermer, Annabelle Neilson, Caroline Stanbury, and Julie Montagu, Viscountess Hinchingbrooke. The season finale aired on 9 November 2015. In April 2016, the network renewed the series for a third season. The third season premiered on 29 November 2016, with Sophie Stanbury. The season finale aired on 7 February 2017. In May 2017, Ladies of London was placed on indefinite hiatus.

== Personal life ==
Fleming lost her title when she married Rory David Fleming, an English banker, at Valdemar's Castle on 13 October 2001. They have two children together, a son, Alexander William Fleming (born 7 April 2004), and a daughter, Josephine Margaretha Victoria Fleming (born 20 December 2006). Josephine's godmother is Mary Donaldson, the Australian-born Queen Consort of Denmark. The couple separated in December 2007 and were divorced in early 2008.

Fleming started dating the Danish footballer Nicklas Bendtner in September 2009, after the two had met when she was filmed renovating her castle on a reality television series. They later got engaged. In December 2010, she gave birth to their son, Nicholas Christian Juel Bendtner, at London's Portland Hospital. The couple announced the end of their engagement and separated in February 2011.

Fleming briefly dated the American banker Christian Hostetter in 2015. She "fell in love" with the French entrepreneur Hervé Larren in 2017, after the two met in Los Angeles while she was promoting her English cookbook. Larren was by her side for her grandmother's funeral at Valdemar's Castle on 22 August 2016.

Fleming lived in Chelsea, London. In June 2019, she moved back home to Denmark.

Fleming is passionate about cooking.

Fleming has been in a relationship with the Danish plastic surgeon Frederik Kølle since September 2023.

== Filmography ==
Year	Title	Notes
2007	Baronessen	Documentary series
2008	Baronessen flytter ind	Documentary series
2009, 2024	Aftenshowet	3 episodes
2010	4-stjerners middag	Host; 4 episodes
2010	Zulu Gumball	Episode: "Episode #1.2"
2010–2014	Danmarks Næste Topmodel	Host; 5 episodes
2015–2017	Ladies of London	Series regular; 21 episodes
2017	Home & Family	Episode: "Brooke Burns/Bruce Boxleitner/Emilie Ullerup/Lonnie Chavis"
