= Kanal 4 =

Danish pay television channel

- Country: Denmark
- Broadcast area: Denmark

Ownership
- Owner: Warner Bros. Discovery EMEA (Skydance Corporation)
- Sister channels: Kanal 5; 6'eren Canal 9

History
- Launched: 1 May 2006
- Replaced: TvDanmark 2

Links
- Website: Official website

Availability

Terrestrial
- Boxer: channel 10

Kanal 4 (Channel 4) is a Danish subscription television channel operated by Warner Bros. Discovery EMEA, a subsidiary of Skydance Corporation. It was launched in 2006 as the successor of the former TvDanmark.

The station is broadcast to Denmark by satellite from London, showing mainly films, US and drama shows, therefore allowing for more lenient advertising rules as compared to broadcasting directly from Denmark.

== History ==
On 24 November 1984, Kanal 2 launched in Copenhagen in an attempt at breaking DR's television monopoly. In its first year on air, the channel aired on weekdays, giving its weekend portion to Weekend-TV (starting 23 December 1984). When Weekend-TV, financed by Nordisk Film, shut down due to lack of money, Kanal 2 became a week-long channel. By 1991 the station was owned by the Scandinavian Broadcasting System.

The stations that shared the same programming (Kanal 2, Vestsjællands TV, TV Næstved, TV Fynboen, TV Aarhus, TV Aalborg) were replaced by a new national service called TvDanmark in 1997 as Denmark's second nationwide commercial terrestrial channel after TV 2. It was renamed TvDanmark 2 when the sister channel TvDanmark 1 was launched. When TvDanmark 1 was renamed Kanal 5, the first channel reverted to its old name, TvDanmark.

SBS unveiled a new strategy in March 2006 with changes to be implemented on the short and long terms. Among them were the renaming of TV Danmark as Kanal 4 on 1 May 2006. The rename repositioned the channel as "Denmark's first female channel". Some of Kanal 5's programmes aimed at the female audience moved to the new service. The channel also inherited the former TVDanmark morning block of cartoons and the news service 5 minuten.

On 1 January 2007, the terrestrial Kanal 4 signals were replaced by a new channel called SBS NET, while Kanal 4 continued broadcasting by satellite and cable. SBS knew that the terrestrial frequencies would be under threat of a new digital broadcasting law. As consequence, Kanal 4 stopped airing news bulletins under the new license. A year after the launch of Kanal 4, SBS conducted a survey with its target audience, with positive results, positioning Kanal 4 as a "strong female brand".

With the rollout of new logos to Warner Bros. Discovery's main channels in the region on 15 January 2024, Kanal 4's colour changed from pink to cyan.

== Logos ==
Kanal 4's first logo from 2006 to 2012

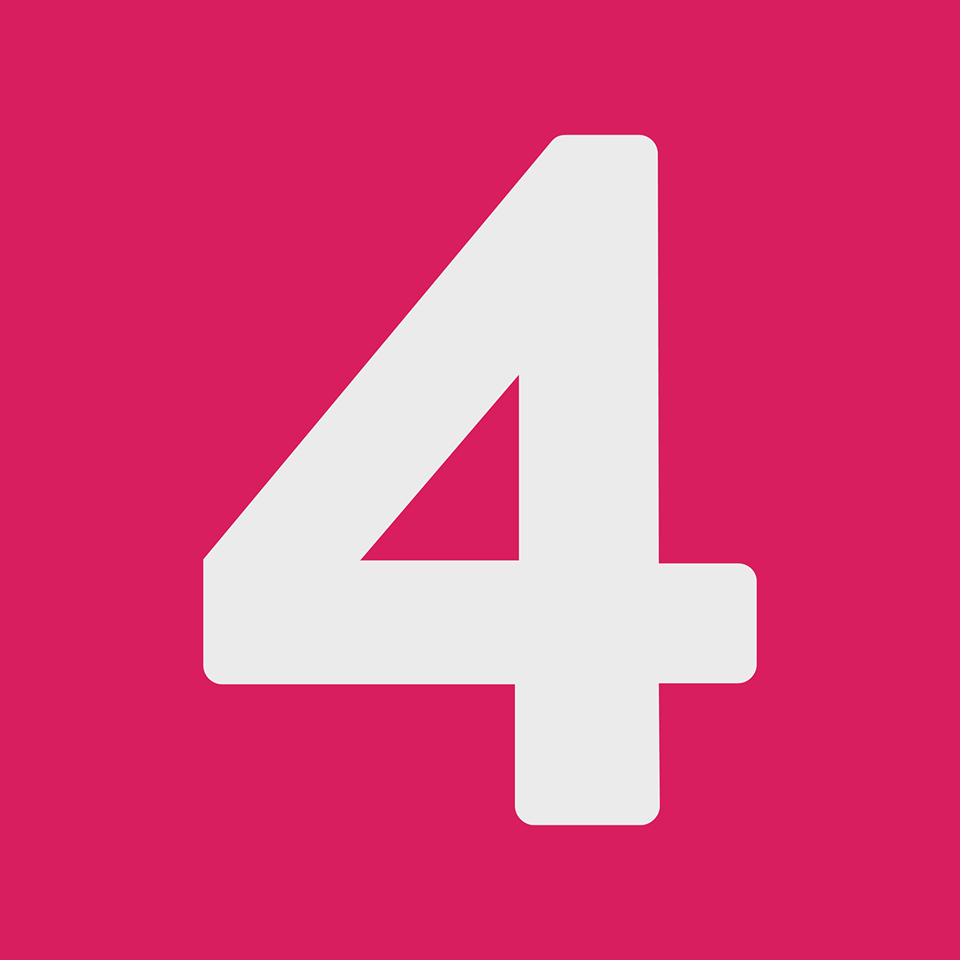
Kanal 4's third logo from 2015 to 2024
