= Hanna Stjärne =

Swedish journalist and media executive (born 1969)

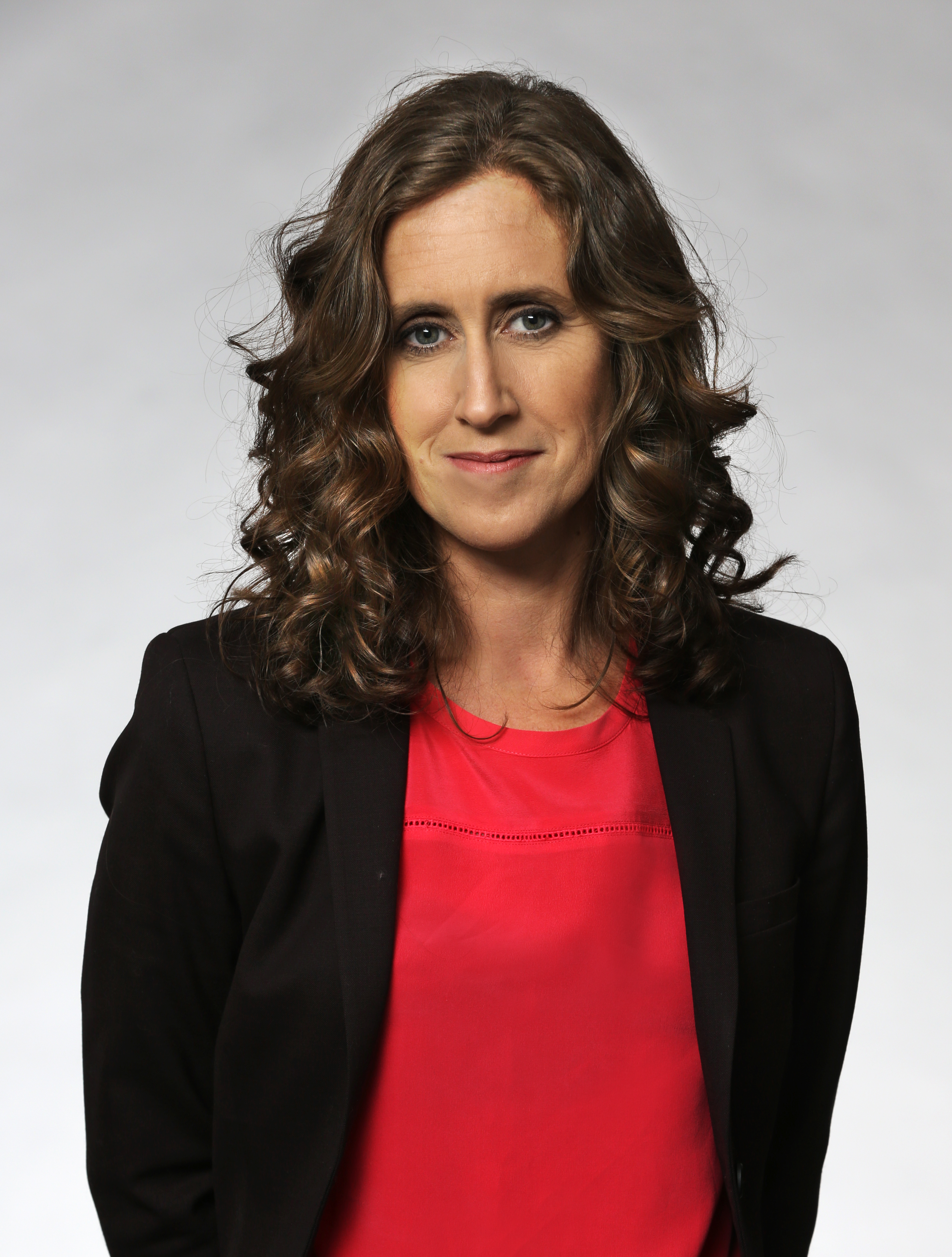
- Born: 17 March 1969 (age 56); Danderyd, Sweden
- Occupation: CEO at SVT
- Children: 1
- Relatives: Jacob Stjärne (brother); Tea Stjärne (niece)

Hanna Lovisa Stjärne (born 17 March 1969) is a Swedish journalist and media executive. In September 2014 she was announced as the new CEO for Sveriges Television (SVT), succeeding the resigning CEO Eva Hamilton. Since 2025 she is the CEO for the Nobel Foundation.

== Biography ==
Hanna Stjärne was born and raised in Danderyd, Sweden. She attended Adolf Fredrik's Music School, with a specialty in singing. She studied journalism at Stockholm University, and then worked as a political reporter at the radio news show Dagens Eko at Sveriges Radio. She was also a foreign reporter based in Brussels for the same show. In 2001, Stjärne became a national reporter for Ekot at Sveriges Radio and in 2002 she was announced as the youngest-ever boss for Sveriges Radio P1. Stjärne has since also been the program administrator for Sveriges Radio with responsibility over the P1, P2, P3 and P4 frequencies.

In 2010, Hanna Stjärne was announced as that year's best female media boss in Sweden. In August 2011, she became the CEO for the UNT-concern. It included the Uppsala Nya Tidning and five other newspapers, as well as radio and television work.

In September 2014, it was announced that Hanna Stjärne would be the new CEO of Sveriges Television and that she would take the post within six months. As CEO, she has also been a member of the Global Task Force for Public Media, an initiative of the Public Media Alliance, since its founding in September 2019.

Hanna Stjärne has a daughter and is the aunt of actress Tea Stjärne.

Media offices
| Preceded by Eva Hamilton | Chief executive officer of Sveriges Television; 15 January 2015 – | Succeeded by Incumbent |
