= SVT Nyheter Norrbotten =

SVT Nyheter Norrbotten, also known as Norrbotten and Nordnytt, is a news program on Sveriges Television (SVT). It has its main studio in Luleå and a local studio in Kiruna.

== History ==
After Sydnytt and Västnytt, Nordnytt was SVT's third regional news program. It premiered on 5 March 1973 as an experiment in implementing regional news in Sweden.

Prior to the launch of Västerbottensnytt in March 2001, Nordnytt broadcast news in Norrbotten County and Västerbotten County. As of 2015, it broadcasts only in Norrbotten. On April 12 it was renamed SVT Nyheter Norrbotten, since it no longer broadcasts in Västerbotten, which is considered a part of Northern Sweden.

== Broadcast times ==
Norrbotten is broadcast on weekdays and Sundays.

On weekdays, it is broadcast at 07:10, 07:40, 08:10, 08:40, 09:10 as parts of Gomorron Sverige. The morning broadcasts are 3.5 minutes long.

Weekday evening editions are broadcast before or after the Aktuellt and Rapport programmes. These include 18:10, 19:15 and 21:45 broadcasts. As of 2015, the broadcasts are 5 minutes, 15 minutes and 10 minutes respectively. On Fridays the last broadcast is on 21:25 and is 5 minutes long.

On Sundays, Norrbotten has broadcasts at 18:10 and 19:55, which are 5 minutes and 4 minutes long respectively.

== See also ==
- Sydnytt - the first SVT regional news program, broadcast in Scania and Blekinge
