= Radiohuset (Stockholm) =

Headquarters of Sveriges Radio in Stockholm, Sweden

Coordinates: 59.3347°N 18.1014°E

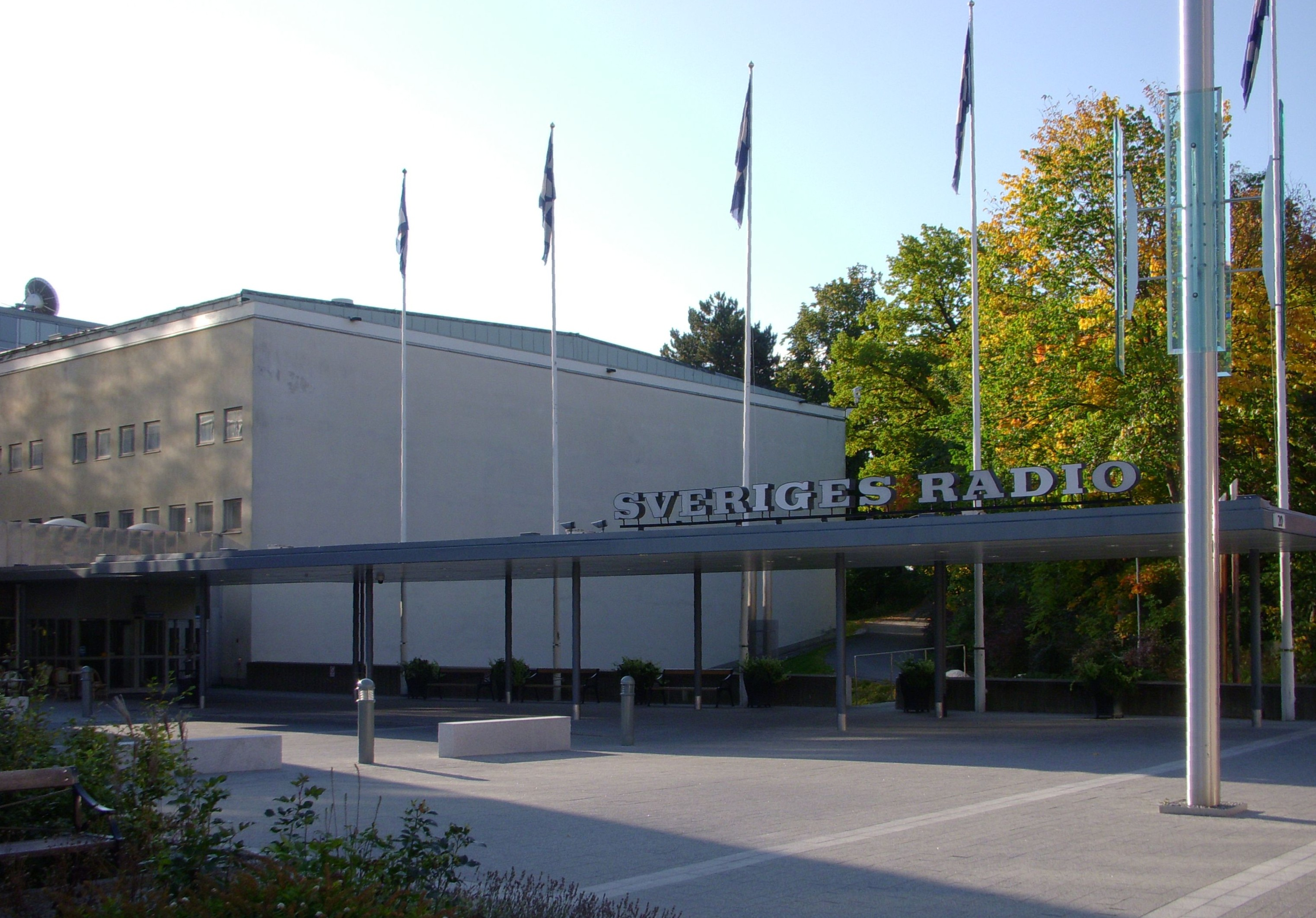
Radiohuset's Oxstiernsgatan entrance

Radiohuset ("the radio house") in Östermalm, Stockholm, is the main headquarters building of Sveriges Radio (SR). Located on Oxstiernsgatan in the Förrådsbacken district, it stands next to Sveriges Television's TV-huset and close to Filmhuset, the headquarters of the Swedish Film Institute. Also nearby is the popular open-air recreational area known as Gärdet.

Programmes produced at Radiohuset are broadcast throughout Sweden on SR's four national radio channels, P1, P2, P3, and P4, and also feature in the multi-lingual output of SR International – Radio Sweden (P6). In 2008, SR's local station in the capital, Radio Stockholm (today with two channels, known as P4 Radio Stockholm and P5 STHLM), moved to Radiohuset from its previously separate studios in Kungsholmen.

The building was first planned in 1955, to designs prepared by the architects Erik Ahnborg and Sune Lindström. Construction work began in 1958 and the official opening took place on 22 September 1962.
