= Beyond Beyond =

- Swedish theatrical release poster
- Swedish: Resan till Fjäderkungens Rike
- Directed by: Esben Toft Jacobsen
- Screenplay by: Jannik Tai Mosholt; Esben Toft Jacobsen
- Produced by: Petter Lindblad
- Starring: Swedish: Edvin Ryding; Tuva Novotny; Gustaf Hammarsten; Lennart Jähkel; Sissela Kyle; Leif Andrée; Danish: Pelle Falk Krusbæk; Søs Egelind; Lars Brygmann; Flemming Quist Møller; English: EvanTubeHD; Jon Heder; Cary Elwes; Patrick Warburton; Emily Deschanel; Ambyr Childers
- Music by: Nicklas Schmidt
- Production companies: Copenhagen Bombay; C More Entertainment; Film i Väst; Noble Entertainment; TV2 Danmark; TV4 Sweden
- Distributed by: Copenhagen Bombay Sverige AB
- Release dates: 10 February 2014 (Berlin International Film Festival); 21 March 2014 (Sweden)
- Running time: 78 minutes
- Countries: Sweden; Denmark
- Language: Swedish

Beyond Beyond (Swedish: Resan till Fjäderkungens Rike), is a 2014 computer-animated comedy-drama film directed by the Danish animator Esben Toft Jacobsen. The movie had its world premiere on 10 February 2014 at the Berlin International Film Festival.

== Plot ==
Jonah is a little rabbit boy whose life is torn apart when his beloved mother is taken away by the Feather King to the afterlife after she develops a bad cough. Unwilling to accept that his mother is gone, Jonah plots to travel to the other side and bring her back. He finally gains his chance when an old dog Bill gives Jonah his ticket to the afterlife.

== Cast ==
Character	Swedish voice actor	Danish voice actor	English voice actor
Jonah	Edvin Ryding	Pelle Falk Krusbæk	Evan from EvanTubeHD
Jonah's mother	Tuva Novotny	Søs Egelind	Ambyr Childers
Jonah's father	Gustaf Hammarsten	Lars Brygmann	Cary Elwes
The Feather King	Lennart Jähkel	Flemming Quist Møller	Patrick Warburton
The Captain	Sissela Kyle	Søs Egelind	Emily Deschanel
Bill	Leif Andrée	Søs Egelind	Jon Heder

== Reception ==
Variety wrote that the creative team behind Beyond Beyond "invent an elaborate mythology around an impressive figure called the Feather King, who guards the realm where Johan, the little rabbit boy, must venture, though the trip proves too dark and complicated for family crowds, limiting export prospects." Common Sense Media also commented upon the film's themes and expressed concern that they might be too dark for younger audiences. Dove marked Beyond Beyond with their "Family Approved" seal and wrote that it was "a charming little story about the loss of a loved one and how that loss effects others."

The SVT Nyheter Norrbotten praised the movie's 3D environment and compared it to works by Hayao Miyazaki, but also felt that the film's premise was too confusing.
