= Henrik Kruusval =

Swedish television presenter (born 1973)

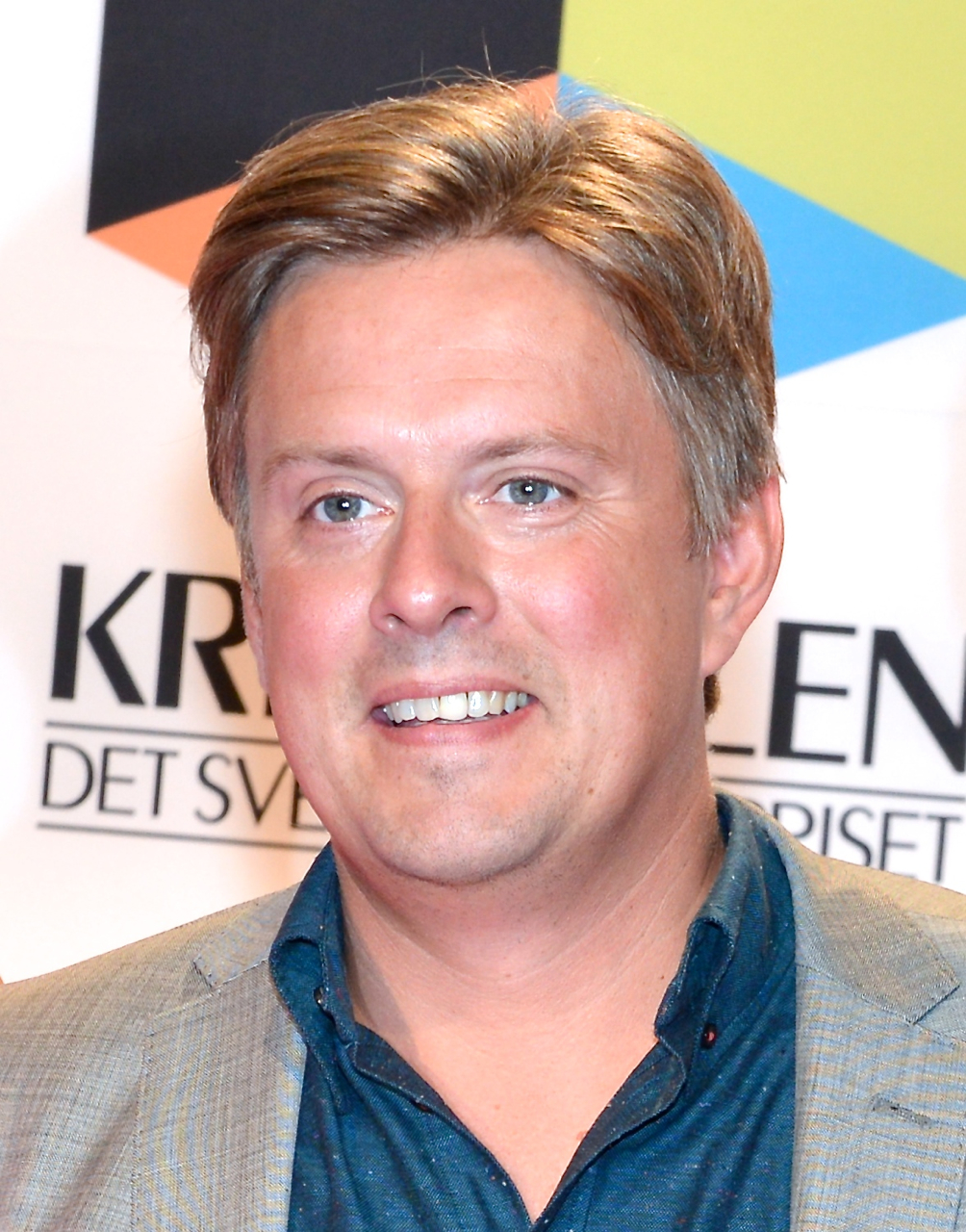
- Henrik Kruusval (2013)
- Born: 10 November 1973 (age 52); Gothenburg, Sweden
- Known for: Landet runt

Carl Henrik Kruusval (born 10 November 1973) is a Swedish television presenter best known for presenting Landet runt which is broadcast on SVT.

Kruusval has presented Landet runt since 2010, he had previously worked for the local news program at Västnytt for SVT and has presented the local talk show Eftersnack, Kruusval has been an employee at SVT since 2003.
