= Swedish Educational Broadcasting Company =

Public-service corporation

Coordinates: 59.336361°N 18.104111°E

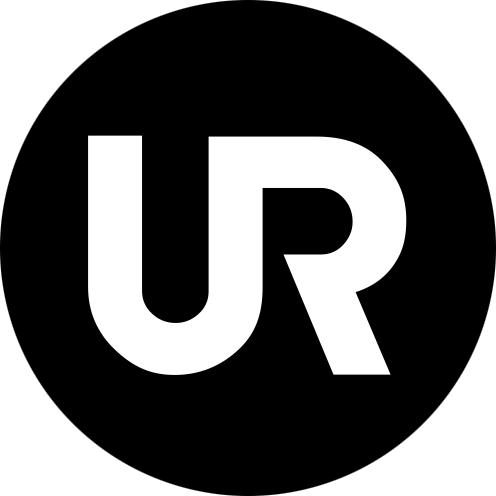

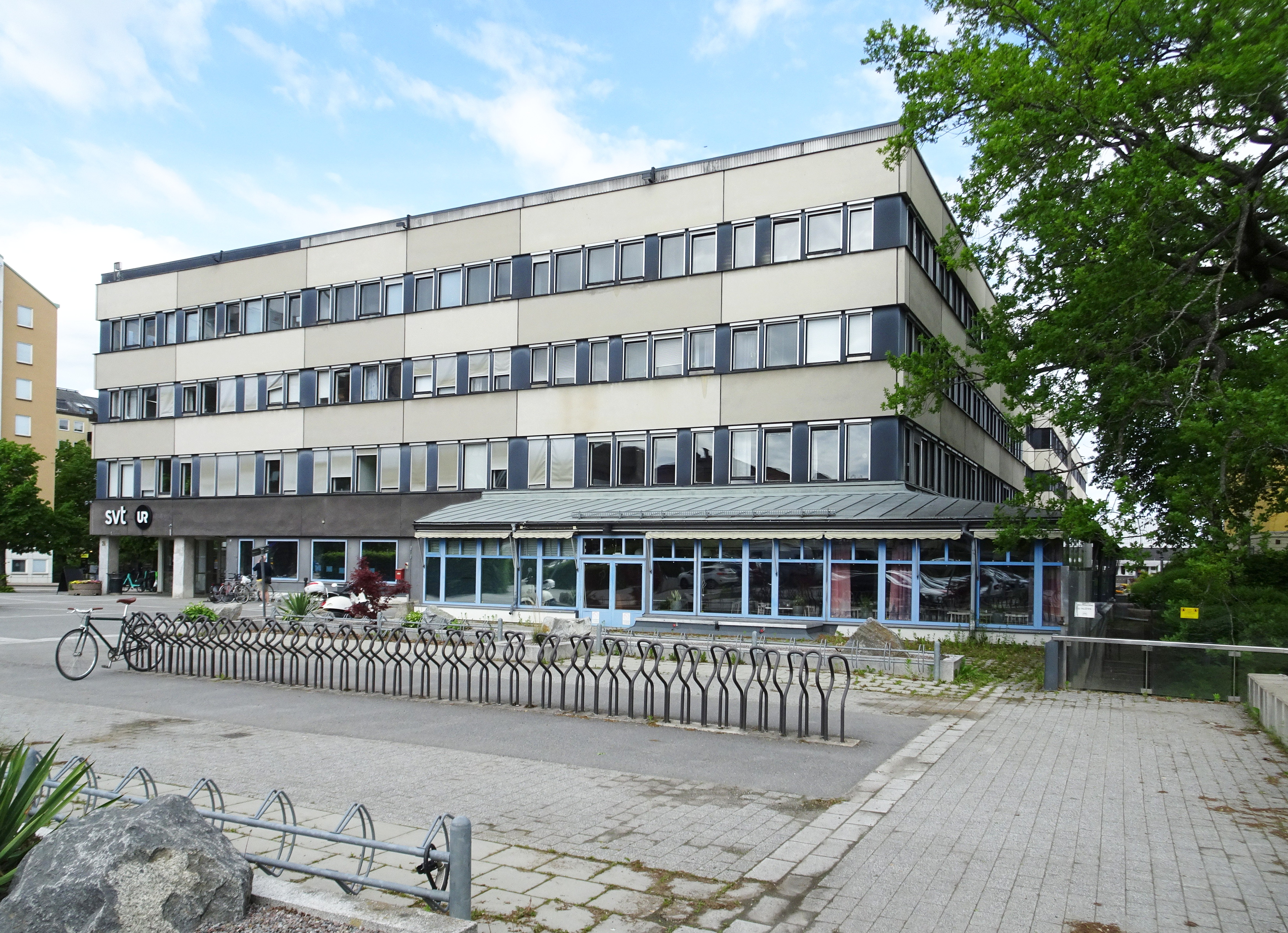
- Native name: Sveriges Utbildningsradio
- Type: Public service broadcasting
- Industry: Mass media
- Genre: Education
- Predecessor: Sveriges Radio
- Founded: 1978; 48 years ago
- Headquarters: Stockholm, Sweden
- Area served: Sweden
- Key people: Kalle Sandhammar (CEO)
- Products: Production of cultural and educational programs for television and radio
- Services: Television, radio, online
- Parent: Foundation Management for SR, SVT, and UR
- Divisions: Kunskapskanalen
- Website: www.ur.se

Swedish Educational Broadcasting Company (Swedish: Sveriges Utbildningsradio or simply Utbildningsradion; UR) is a public-service corporation providing educational programming on radio and television.

The company is a member of the European Broadcasting Union and Nordvision.

== History ==
The company originates from experiments with Skolradio (school radio) by the National Swedish Board of Education in 1928, a business that became permanent in 1929. In 1931, Radiotjänst became the principal for its broadcasts. In 1961, test broadcasts of school television began, an activity that in 1964 merged with school radio. To this was later added SR's adult education and the activity was financed with tax funds.

In 1967, Kommittén för Television och Radio i Utbildningen (TRU), the committee for television and radio, was started in the education of the state as an experimental activity of sending wireless teaching materials to universities and preschools. The location was in Stocksund and the business continued until 1978 when it was taken over by the newly started Sveriges Utbildningsradio AB.

In 1978, an extensive reorganization was carried out in which Sveriges Radio (SR) was split into four subsidiaries owned by SR: Sveriges Riksradio (RR), Swedish National Radio; Sveriges Lokalradio (LRAB), Swedish Local Radio; Sveriges Utbildningsradio (UR), Swedish Educational Broadcasting; and Sveriges Television (SVT), Swedish Television. In 1985, the tax financing ceased and UR's program was financed by the television fee. In 1994, another reorganization was made and UR became an independent company.

Between 1999 and 2006, a series of books on the history of educational programs and UR have been published by Arkiv förlag. A total of 16 volumes were published in this series of publications. In 2016, UR was rejected by the Discrimination Ombudsman after placing a job advertisement where dark skin color was included in the applicant's qualifications.

== Distribution ==
UR broadcasts their programming on Sveriges Radio's channels P1, P2, P3 and P4 as well as Sveriges Television's SVT1, SVT2 and SVT Barn. On 27 September 2004, Kunskapskanalen (The Knowledge Channel) started broadcasting. The channel is run as a collaborative project between UR and SVT. Each company accounts for fifty percent of the content and airtime.

== Content ==
UR creates only content with educational purposes. The company aims to increase the general level of education within the swedish population targeting especially children and adolescents. Thus the company creates a large range of programs and video clips about factual topics of general interest within the swedish population. UR states on their website that since they're financed by the government, they're able to produce non profit programs which everyone needs but nobody else wants to produce. Even though the company always produces content with educational value some programs have an entertainment focus where the factual information plays a rather minor role. UR programs are frequently used in swedish school education. Teachers often show UR clips in order to supplement or dive deeper in a certain subject. A wide majority of UR programs are popular among teachers especially because UR programs usually contain a lot of pedagogy.

== Management ==
CEOs:

- Börje Dahlqvist (1977–1986)
- Lars Hansson (1986–1998)
- Rolf Svensson (1998–1999, acting)
- Christina Björk (2000–2009)
- Erik Fichtelius (2009–2015)
- Christel Tholse Willers (2015–2017)
- Per Bergkrantz (2017–2018, acting)
- Sofia Wadensjö Karén (2018–2023)
- Kalle Sandhammar (2023–)

== See also ==
- Educational television
- Radiotjänst i Kiruna (former licence fee agency)
- Swedish Broadcasting Commission
