= Nordvision =

Cooperative of Nordic public service broadcasters

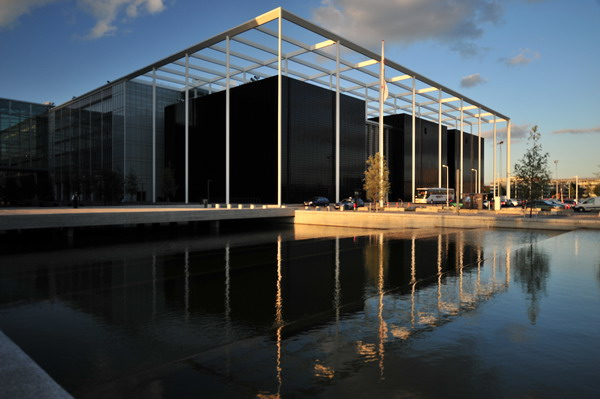
- Founded: October 1959; 66 years ago
- Headquarters: DR Byen, Copenhagen, Denmark
- Website: www.nordvision.org

Nordvision is a cooperative venture, established in 1959, between five Nordic public service broadcasters: Denmark's DR, Norway's NRK, Iceland's RÚV, Sweden's SVT and Finland's YLE. Sweden's SR and UR, Greenland's KNR, Åland's ÅRTV and the Faroe Islands' KVF are associate members.

Nordvision's main task is the co-production and exchange of television programmes. It has its secretariat in Copenhagen, at DR Byen.

== History ==
The founding of Nordvision was primarily based on cultural rather than economic incentives. The Nordic countries are important potential markets for one another's productions. One of the original thoughts was to take advantage of the similarity of the Scandinavian languages, even if in practice, while the languages are closely related, they are too far apart to be fully understood without subtitles when television series are broadcast to the audiences in neighbouring countries. Nevertheless, other cultural similarities and the tradition of Nordic collaboration have favoured production and distribution of television programmes across Nordic countries.

Denmark started regular broadcasts in 1954, Sweden in 1956, Finland in 1957, while Norway did not begin until 1960. Sweden, Finland and Norway have a large territory but a relatively small population, and one reason for the late introduction of television was related to the feasibility a transmitter system that would provide the majority of the population with access. Moreover, the government policy for example in Sweden concentrated efforts and financial resources on the construction of a network of stations rather than on increasing programming hours. Thus, a regional programme exchange was also seen as a solution to programme supply, particularly in categories with high productions costs, such as entertainment and drama. In this context, television was seen as having a potential to make a major contribution towards developing and fostering Nordic cooperation. Whilst the more extensive European exchange system Eurovision already existed since 1955, the programming it provided was focused on sports, news and cultural events, due to the technological constraints posed by live transmissions and language differences as it would not have been possible to provide subtitles. Mainly because of the late start of television in Norway, Nordvision began later than its wider European counterpart. Denmark and Sweden had begun cooperating in TV production as early as the summer of 1958, but the official start of the Nordic exchange did not take place until October 1959.

In contrast to Eurovision, the Nordvision exchange programmes also included light entertainment and popular music series, helping to make popular culture from the Nordic countries familiar across national borders.

== Members ==
Map of countries with members and associate members of Nordvision

Members:

- (Denmark) Danmarks Radio (DR, since 1959)
- (Sweden) Sveriges Television (SVT, since 1959)
- (Norway) Norsk rikskringkasting (NRK, since 1959)
- (Finland) Yleisradio (YLE, since 1959)
- (Iceland) Ríkisútvarpið (RÚV, since 1966)

Associate members:

- (Åland) Ålands Radio and TV (ÅRTV)
- (Greenland) Kalaallit Nunaata Radioa (KNR, since 1997)
- (Faroe Islands) Kringvarp Føroya (KVF, since 2005)
- (Sweden) Sveriges Radio (SR, since 2016)
- (Sweden) Sveriges Utbildningsradio (UR)

== Activities ==
=== Co-production and programme exchange ===
Nordvision hosts six programme groups where the co-production and programme collaboration take place on a practical level: Children, culture, drama, knowledge, factual and investigative journalism.

Some of the most well-known Nordvision co-productions include:

- Kontrapunkt (Music quiz from 1966 to 1991)
- Fleksnes (Norwegian TV comedy from 1972 to 2002)
- Matador (Danish TV series from 1978 to 1981)
- Fanny and Alexander (Original title: Fanny och Alexander, Swedish film from 1982)
- The Best Intentions (Original title: Den goda viljan, Swedish TV film from 1990 and series from 1991)
- The Kingdom (Original title: Riget, Danish miniseries from 1994 to 1997)
- Sophie's World (Original title: Sofies verden, Norwegian-Swedish Drama-adventure film from 1999)
- Krøniken (Danish drama series from 2002 to 2006)
- MGP Nordic (Melodi Grand Prix Nordic, Song contest for children)
- The Eagle: A Crime Odyssey (Original title: Ørnen, Danish crime series from 2004 to 2006)
- The Killing (Original title: Forbrydelsen, Danish crime series since from 2007 to 2012)
- Borgen (Danish drama series since from 2010 to 2013)
- The Bridge (Original title: Broen / Bron, Swedish-Danish crime series from 2011 to 2018)
- SKAM (Norwegian youth TV series from 2015 to 2017)
- Exit (Norwegian drama series from 2022 to 2023)
- Nordic Beats (Six part electronic music documentary, 2023)

=== Nordvision Fund ===
The Nordvision Fund, established in 1988, is an important financing source for major drama productions. The Fund gets its revenues from cable distribution of TV programmes from the partners in the Nordic countries. The Fund's money is earmarked for Nordic co-productions and joint projects, and aims at strengthening the Nordic cultural cooperation and to stimulate the use of Nordic authors and performing artists.

=== Collaborative forums and expert networks ===
The Nordic cooperation also contains a number of expert groups who meet regularly to exchange experience and knowledge. This collaboration encompasses several aspects, such as corporate strategy, program development, scheduling and copyright.

== See also ==
- Eurovision
- Intervision
