= ABC (Swedish TV programme) =

Television news series (1987–2015)

- Genre: News programme
- Country of origin: Sweden
- Original language: Swedish

Production
- Production locations: Stockholm, Uppsala
- Camera setup: Multi-camera
- Running time: Varies
- Production company: Sveriges Television

Original release
- Network: SVT1
- Release: 31 August 1987 – 10 April 2015

ABC was a Swedish regional news programme. It was Sveriges Television's (SVT's) regional news service for Stockholm County and Uppsala County between 1987 and 2015.

The name came from the county letters for Stockholm (AB) and Uppsala (C). The programme was broadcast from the SVT news studio in Stockholm and had a local office in Uppsala.

== History ==
SVT had been airing regional news since the start of Sydnytt in 1970 and had slowly opened up new regional news services for different parts of the country. ABC started in 1987, making Stockholm and Uppsala the last counties in Sweden to receive regional television news.

The first edition aired on 31 August 1987 and was hosted by Bengt Magnusson.

A dedicated edition of the programme for Uppsala County called SVT Uppland was launched on 25 February 2008. SVT Uppland only replaced the main edition at 19:15, other editions were still shared between both counties.

The programme was last broadcast on 10 April 2015. It was replaced by three regional news programmes: SVT Nyheter Stockholm, SVT Nyheter Uppsala and SVT Nyheter Södertälje.

== See also ==
- Journalism in Sweden
- List of Swedish television series
