= Radio House =

Radio House may refer to:

- Radiohuset, former headquarters of the Danish national broadcaster DR
- Radiohuset (Stockholm), the main headquarters building of Sveriges Radio
- Flagey Building, headquarters of the former Belgian national broadcaster INR/NIR
- Radio House (Saint Petersburg), a historic building on Malaya Sadovaya Street, Saint Petersburg, Russia
