= Landet runt =

Swedish news program

- Country of origin: Sweden
- Original language: Swedish

Original release
- Network: SVT
- Release: 1988

Landet runt (Swedish for "around the country") is a Swedish news programme broadcast by Sveriges Television. The program focus on local news highlights, unique human-interest stories and everyday encounters from all across Sweden. It is broadcast on SVT1 from Gothenburg at 18.15 on Sundays. It is a sister programme to Sverige idag which is broadcast from Umeå on SVT1 on weekday evenings.

The program was presented by Larz-Thure Ljungdahl from the start until 2000, later by Henrik Kruusval from 2010 and into the 2020s. Wrote Aftonbladet, "For 36 years 'Landet runt' has delivered the antithesis to war around the world, Nato accession, gang violence and illegal mounts of [discarded] clothing in Western Africa".

== Television presenters ==
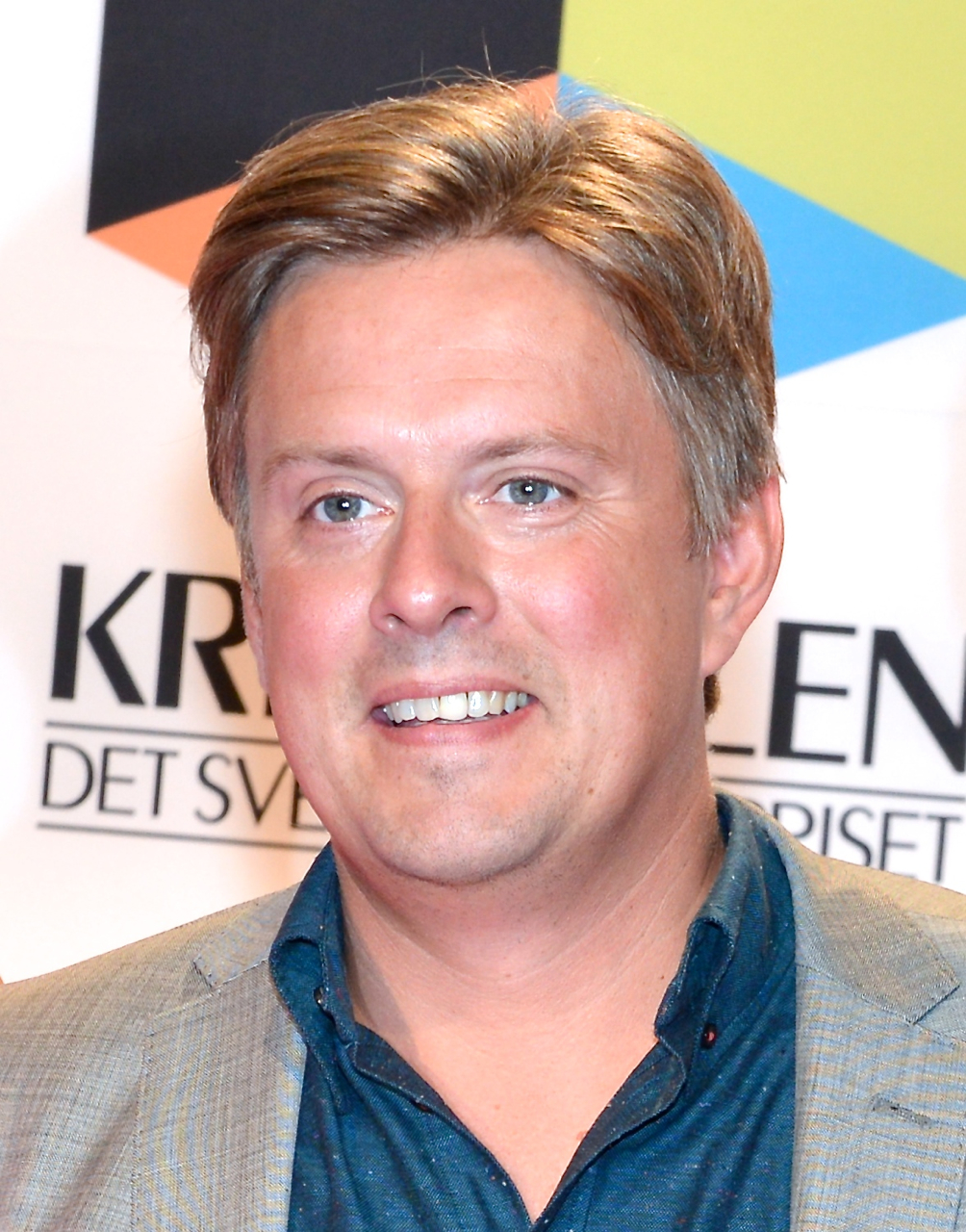
Henrik Kruusval 2013.

- Bengt Alsterlind
- Larz-Thure Ljungdahl (1988–2000)
- Staffan Lindström (2001–2002)
- Karin Mannberg (2003–2009)
- Henrik Kruusval (2010–)
