= Curman =

Curman is a surname, likely of Swedish origin. Notable people with the surname include:

- Calla Curman (1850–1935), Swedish writer, salon-holder, and feminist
- Carl Curman (1833–1913), Swedish physician and balneologist
- Maria Curman (born 1950), Swedish businesswoman
