= Ingemar Odlander =

Swedish journalist

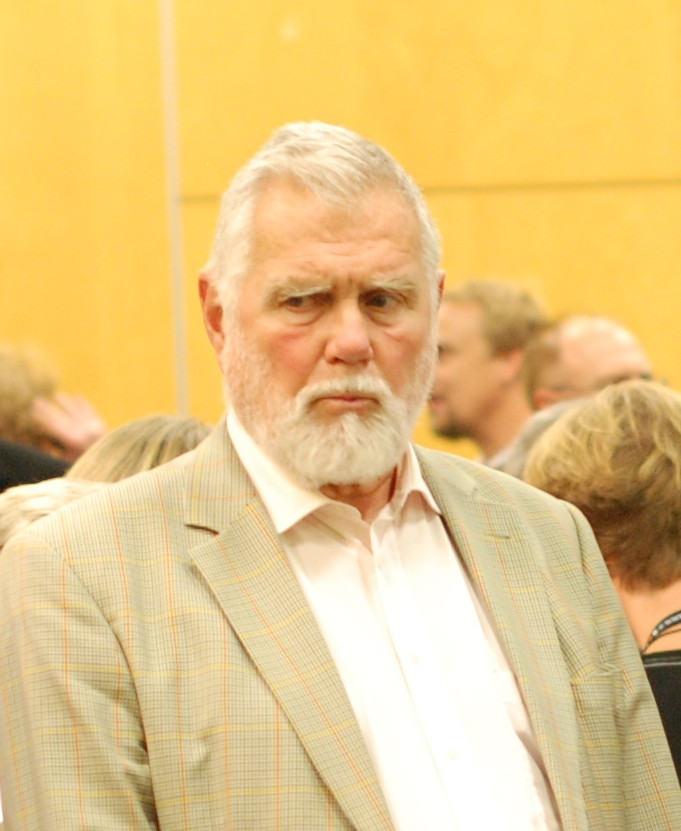
- Ingemar Odlander in 2010
- Born: Hertur Roland Ingemar Odlander; 29 February 1936
- Died: 19 July 2014 (aged 78)
- Occupation: Journalist
- Employer: SVT
- Notable credit(s): Aktuellt; Rapport

Hertur Roland Ingemar Odlander (29 February 1936 – 19 July 2014) was a Swedish journalist who worked for Sveriges Television on its news programmes Aktuellt and Rapport. Between 1975 and 1978 Odlander was the first ever Swedish foreign news reporter stationed in Nairobi. From 1978 and until his death in 2014 Odlander was married to Christina Jutterström.
