= Vinsten =

- Origin: Sweden
- Genres: Electropop
- Years active: 2012-present
- Labels: EMI
- Members: Calle Wachtmeister; Niklas Benjaminson
- Website: www.vinstenmusic.com

Vinsten is a Swedish electropop duo made up of Calle Wachtmeister and Niklas Benjaminson. Their debut single "Luckiest Girl", a theme song from Portkod 1321, a 10-part web series on Swedish website SVT Play in October and November 2012 has made it to #15 on Sverigetopplistan, the official Swedish Singles Chart.

== Discography ==
Year	Song	Peak chart positions	Album
Year	Song	SWE	Album
2012	"Luckiest Girl"	15	
