= Smålandsnytt =

Swedish television news programme

Smålandsnytt is a Swedish regional news programme, broadcast by Sveriges Television (SVT).

The programme covers the three counties in the historical provinces of Småland and Öland in southeast Sweden: Jönköping County, Kalmar County and Kronoberg County. The programme is broadcast from studios located in Växjö, with district newsrooms in Jönköping and Kalmar.
