= Värmlandsnytt =

Swedish regional news programme

Värmlandsnytt is a Swedish regional news programme, serving the historic province of Värmland in the west of mid Sweden, broadcast on Sveriges Television (SVT).

The programme is broadcast from studios located in Karlstad.
