= Play Rapport =

Swedish news website

- The Play Rapport interface
- Available in: Swedish
- Owner: Sveriges Television
- Website: playrapport.se
- Registration: no
- Launched: 2008
- Current status: active

Play Rapport is a Swedish web based video news service created by Sveriges Television (SVT). The name comes from SVT Play, which is the general brand for video-on-demand services from SVT, and Rapport, which is SVT's main news programme.

SVT announced the launch of the service and that longtime news anchor Claes Elfsberg would be its primary presenter in January 2008. The service had its official launch May 5, 2008 in Kungsträdgården after a few weeks of public beta testing. The service was reported to have had 40,000 visitors during its first day. SVT originally thought that they would be the first to launch such a service in Sweden, but the TV4 Group managed to develop and launch a news channel a few weeks before SVT.

The service consists of various video clips and is initially updated between 7 a.m. and 11 p.m. on weekdays, and between 8 a.m. and 6 p.m. on weekends. The "broadcast" starts immediately after the webpage has loaded with a news summary. It is then possible to watch all stories in the playlist as a regular newscast, and to choose the stories one wants to see. It is also possible to search for older news stories and watch regional news. All videos can be embedded onto external web pages and blogs. The site can play video in fullscreen, in the regular interface and in a "mini player". In July 2008, SVT presented a desktop widget with news headlines for Play Rapport.

The videos are encoded with Flash Video and the navigation is made in Adobe Flash. The concept was developed by the web agency Doberman who had previously designed the SVT website, svt.se.
