= Christina Jutterström =

Swedish television executive

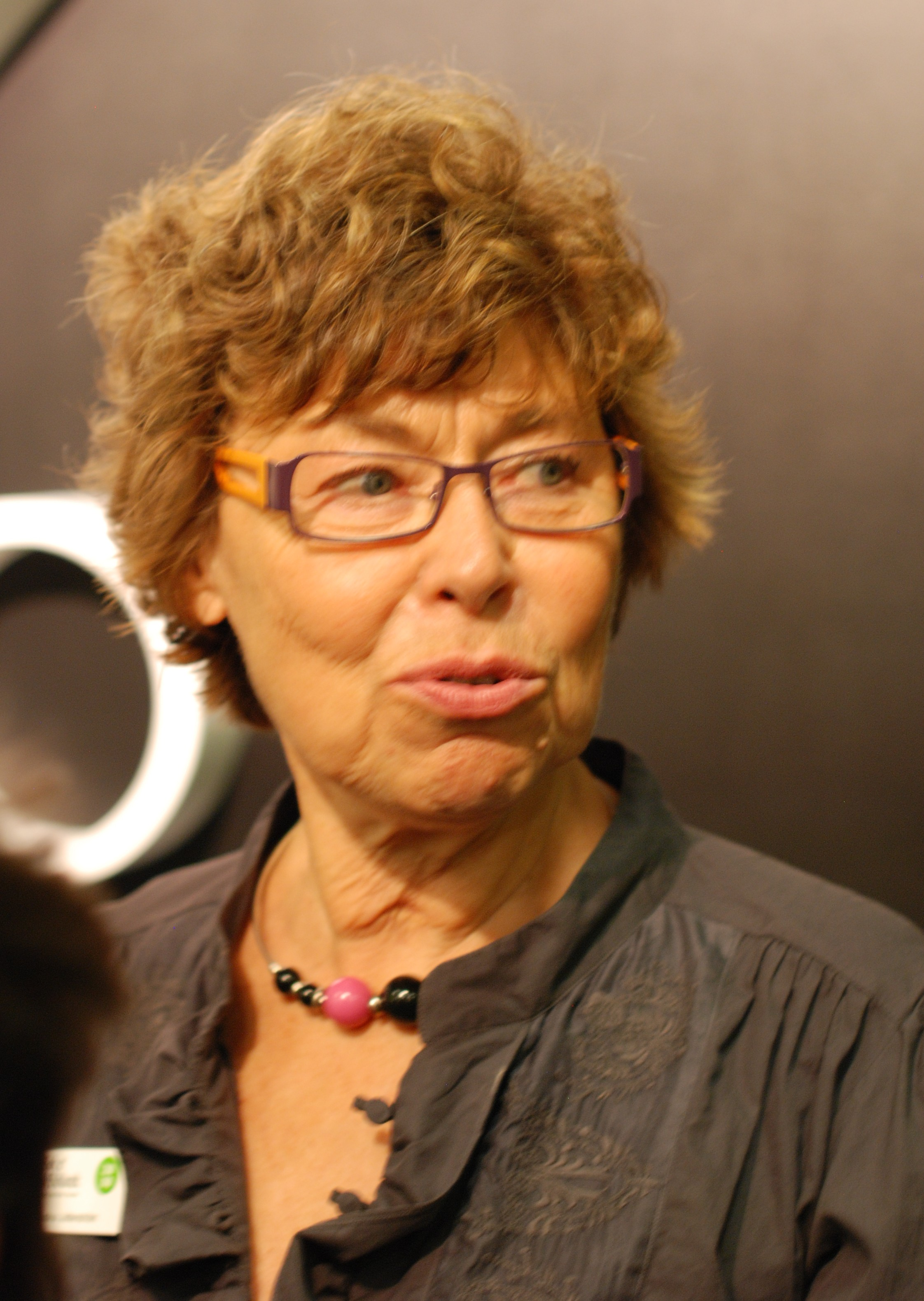
- Born: 27 March 1940
- Spouse(s): Ingemar Odlander
- Awards: (2018)

Christina Jutterström (born 27 March 1940) is a Swedish journalist, former chief editor for Dagens Nyheter between 1982 and 1995 and for Expressen between 1995 and 1996. In 2001 Jutterström was appointed the CEO post at public broadcaster Sveriges Television, a post she held until 2006. She was married to Ingemar Odlander from 1978 until his death in 2014.

Media offices
Preceded by Bengt Dennis	Chief Editor of Dagens Nyheter; 1982 – 1995	Succeeded by Arne Ruth
Preceded by Olle Wästberg	Chief Editor of Expressen; 1995 – 1996	Succeeded by Staffan Thorsell
Preceded by Maria Curman	Chief executive officer of Sveriges Television; 15 August 2001 – 5 November 2006	Succeeded by Eva Hamilton
