= Gävledala =

Swedish television programme

Gävledala is Sveriges Television's regional news programme for Gävleborgs and Dalarnas län. The programme has been shown since January 1994, and is broadcast from Falun.
