= EvanTubeHD =

American YouTuber

- Born: Evan Lee; December 1, 2005 (age 20); Pennsylvania, United States
- Awards: Guinness World Record for Most Viewed Video Game Unboxing Video

YouTube information
- Channel: EvanTubeHD
- Years active: 2011–present
- Genres: Children; toy unboxing
- Subscribers: 6.96 million
- Views: 4.62 billion
- Last updated: July 5, 2026

Evan Lee (born December 1, 2005), known professionally as EvanTubeHD is an American YouTuber. Evan, along with his family produces long-form videos on Mass online streaming platform YouTube, among all of his five main channels: EvanTubeHD, The Tube Family (formerly EvanTubeRAW), EvanTubeGaming, JillianTubeHD, DT Sings, and DT's GEEK SHOW.

== Career ==
Starting in 2011, Evan, with the help of his father, would make his first videos, one being a stop-motion video featuring Angry Birds plushies, and another being him showing off clay sculptures of all the birds. The majority of his content would then be Angry Birds related, but Lee would take out what toy he would review, and demonstrate its capabilities. He would later get several sponsorships and toys reviewed by many companies, before uploading his 2013 video "WORLD'S LARGEST GUMMY WORM vs. KID!" It would gain up 146 million views by April 2026.

By 2014, the channel would make an estimated $1,500,000 in a full year, with $100,000 being estimated from Google ads alone. As his brand continued to grow, he would receive several more accomplishments and grow, such as guest-appearing in The Tonight Show Starring Jimmy Fallon, a Guinness World Record for Most Viewed Video Game Unboxing Video, and even inspire many more YouTube channels such as Ryan's World. He would also take part in the movie Beyond Beyond, leading as the main voice actor for Jonah, the protagonist in the movie’s English dub.

As of now, EvanTube is not as active anymore on social media, occasionally uploading family videos, and is currently enrolled in Loyola Marymount University in Los Angeles. He at the time he said. “I get millions — or maybe, I don't know, millions — but a ton of comments of you guys saying, ‘You were my childhood.’ It's really appreciated. Thank you guys so much for watching all my videos. I hope you guys will support me and my future projects, whatever I do in the future.”
