= Sverige idag =

- Network: SVT1 (Swedish), SVT2 (Meänkieli, Romani)
- Launched: January 18, 2011
- Country of origin: Sweden
- Headquarters: Formvägen 14, 906 21 Umeå
- Original language(s): Meänkieli, Romani, Swedish

Sverige idag (Swedish for "Sweden today") is a news program broadcast by Sveriges Television since 2011. It covers current affairs from all over the country by using a compilation of reports from the regional news programs of SVT. It is a sister programme to Landet runt, which is broadcast from Gothenburg on SVT1 on Sunday evening.

Sverige idag is broadcast from Umeå on SVT1 at weekdays at 17:30. It has previously been broadcast on SVT2 on Sundays and Mondays in Meänkieli and Romani.
