= Eva Hamilton =

Swedish journalist

Countess Eva Hamilton
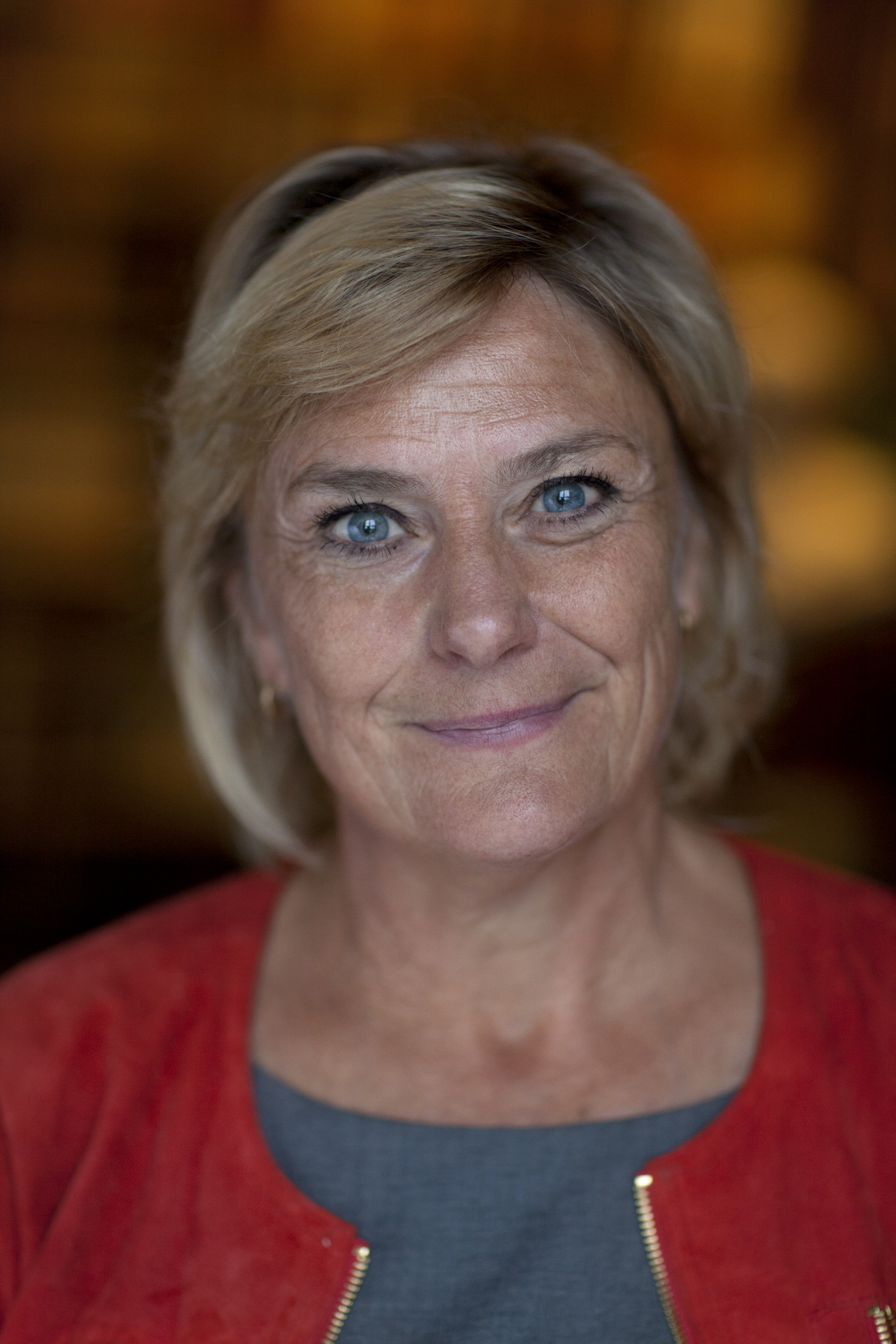
- Eva Hamilton (2014)
- Born: 29 April 1954 (age 71); Stockholm, Sweden
- Occupation: CEO at SVT

Countess Eva Gerd Alice Cecilia Hamilton (born 29 April 1954) is a Swedish journalist who from 6 November 2006 until 2014 was the CEO for the Swedish public service television company Sveriges Television. In 2007, Hamilton was named "Sweden's most powerful woman in media" by the Veckans Affärer magazine.

Media offices
Preceded by Christina Jutterström	Chief executive officer of Sveriges Television; 6 November 2006 – 30 November 2014	Succeeded by Hanna Stjärne
