= SVT Uutiset =

Swedish television news program

Uutiset
- Network: SVT2 Before 15 January 2001 SVT1
- Launched: 22 August 1988
- Country of origin: Sweden
- Formerly known as: Uutiset - Nyheter
- Format: 16:9 1080i
- Running time: 17:45–17:55
- Original language(s): Finnish
- Official website: http://svt.se/nyheter/uutiset/

Uutiset is a news program for the Sweden Finns from Sveriges Television. It is broadcast on SVT2 during 17:45 to 17:55 in Finnish. However, just like most foreign-language programmes aired on Swedish television, the show is subtitled in Swedish, but when an interviewee responds in Swedish the response is subtitled into Finnish. The program started broadcasting on 22 August 1988, together with SVT's channel in Finland, SVT4 (later renamed as SVT Europa). Before the "Nyhetsflytt" (News swap) on 15 January 2001, Uutiset was broadcast on Kanal 1 and SVT1 at 17:50.

== See also ==
- Sweden Finns
