= Dagens Eko =

Swedish news radio program

- Country of origin: Sweden
- Language: Swedish
- Original release: October 1, 1937
- Website: sr.se/ekot

Dagens Eko ("Echo of the day") – often shortened to Ekot ("The echo") – is the news service of Swedish national radio broadcaster Sveriges Radio. It provides news bulletins of variable length which are known as Ekonyheter ("Echo news") and broadcast at the top of most hours on the P1 and P4 networks. Those on P4 are supplemented by local news reports.

On P1 there are extra bulletins on the half-hour at 5.30–8.30 on weekdays as part of the nearly 4-hour-long morning news magazine P1-morgon. P1 also carries longer news programmes at 12.30 (Luncheko, concluding with a press review), 15.45 (weekdays only), 16.45, and 17.45. The 16.45 edition (Dagens Eko kvart i fem) is Sweden's most listened-to radio news programme claiming a daily audience of around two million.

Dagens Eko made its first broadcast on 1 October 1937. The service was developed by the broadcaster Carl-Åke Wadsten who was inspired by visits he had made earlier in the year to study news broadcasting in the United Kingdom and Germany – the name Dagens Eko is a direct translation of the German Echo des Tages.

== The Dagens Eko signature chimes ==
The three-note signal on chimes which introduces and closes each edition of Dagens Eko closely resembles that first broadcast by American station WSB in the 1920s.
