= Foundation Management for SR, SVT, and UR =

Swedish broadcasting organisation

- Förvaltningsstiftelsen för Sveriges Radio AB, Sveriges Television AB och Sveriges Utbildningsradio AB
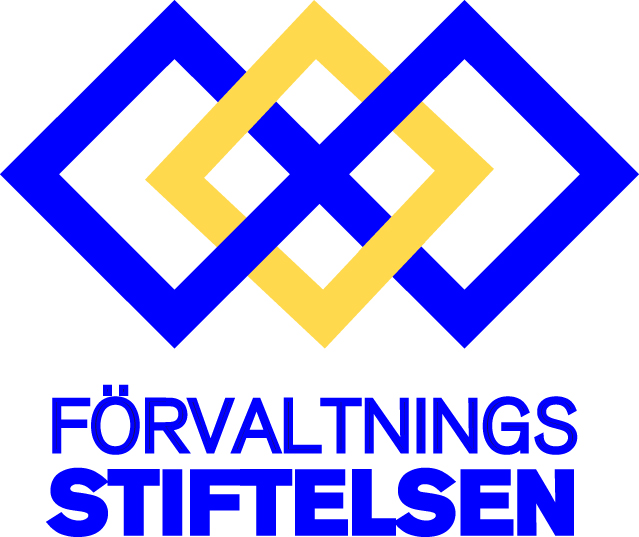
- Formation: 1997; 29 years ago
- Location: Åsögatan 149 116 32 Stockholm, Sweden
- Members: Sveriges Television; Sveriges Radio; Swedish Educational Broadcasting Company
- Owner: Government of Sweden
- Website: Official website (in Swedish)

Förvaltningsstiftelsen för SR, SVT och UR (shorten to Förvaltningsstiftelsen; abbreviated to SRT or Foundation Management for SR, SVT, and UR) is a Swedish organisation that administers the country's three public broadcasters: Sveriges Television (SVT), Sveriges Radio (SR) and the Swedish Educational Broadcasting Company (UR).

== History ==
The advent of cable, satellite and commercial television in Sweden from the 1980s was considered to be a turbulent period within the Swedish mass media sector, which was until then entirely dominated by the monopoly public radio and television channels as well as the domestic press.

In the spring of 1993, the Riksdag decided, after a one-man investigation, to change the ownership of the public service broadcasters to reflect the greatly altered mass media landscape. Prior to the amendment, the shares of the Swedish public broadcasting service had been divided between the Swedish social movements (folkrörelser; 60% [until 1967 40%]), the business community (näringslivet; 20%) and the daily press (dagspressen; 20% [until 1967 40%]). The three ownership groups now no longer wanted to continue as owners, in part because some of them had engaged in competing activities.

Through this amendment, the three public broadcasters (SVT, SR and UR) came to be owned by separate management foundations from 1 January 1994. However, these three fiduciary foundations had an identical board composition and the same overall objectives. As an alternative to the foundation form, it was discussed, among other things, to place them directly under state ownership, but this option was considered inappropriate as such a solution would place the organisation directly under the executive branch of the Swedish government.

Förvaltningsstiftelsen was formed in 1997 through the merger of the foundations managing SVT, SR and UR. The Swedish government and the Riksdag considered this organisational change to be justified because the three management foundations had the same overall goals.

== Representation in international organisations ==
Förvaltningsstiftelsen (and its predecessors) holds the Swedish membership of the European Broadcasting Union.
