= Maria Curman =

Swedish businesswoman

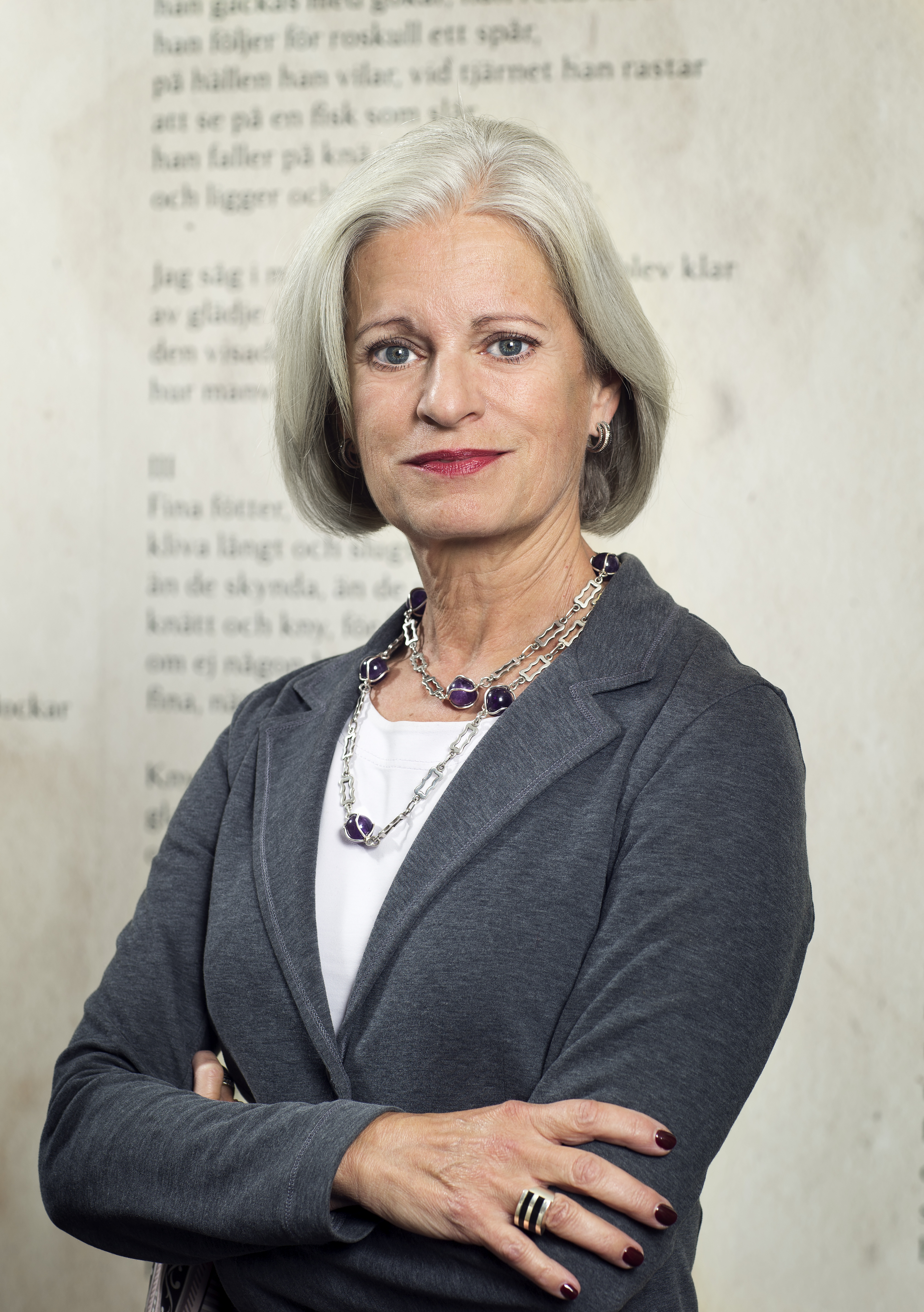
- Maria Curman (2014)
- Born: 19 October 1950 (age 75); Palma de Mallorca, Spain
- Spouse: Carl Curman
- Parents: Joaquin Ruiz de Porras Gay (father); Rosario Abadal de Solá (mother)

Maria Curman (born 19 October 1950) is a Swedish businesswoman. She is the daughter of engineer Joaquin Ruiz de Porras Gay and Rosario Abadal de Solá. She married Carl Curman, an economist, in 1972. She studied at the Handelshögskolan in Stockholm in 1973, and then started to work in the publisher business. She has also been a CFO at Esselte between 1982 and 1985, she was the CEO of Almqvist & Wiksell between 1985 and 1992, and publishing manager for Bonnier Utbildning between 1993 and 1996. In late 1996, she became CEO of SVT Drama at Sveriges Television. She was CEO of SVT between 2000 and 2001.

Media offices
Preceded by Sam Nilsson	Chief executive officer of Sveriges Television; 1 January 2000 – 21 May 2001	Succeeded by Christina Jutterström
