= SVT Play =

- The current SVT Play logo since 2017.
- Country: Sweden
- Broadcast area: Sweden, online
- Network: SVT
- Headquarters: Malmö

History
- Launched: 14 December 2006

Links
- Website: svt.se

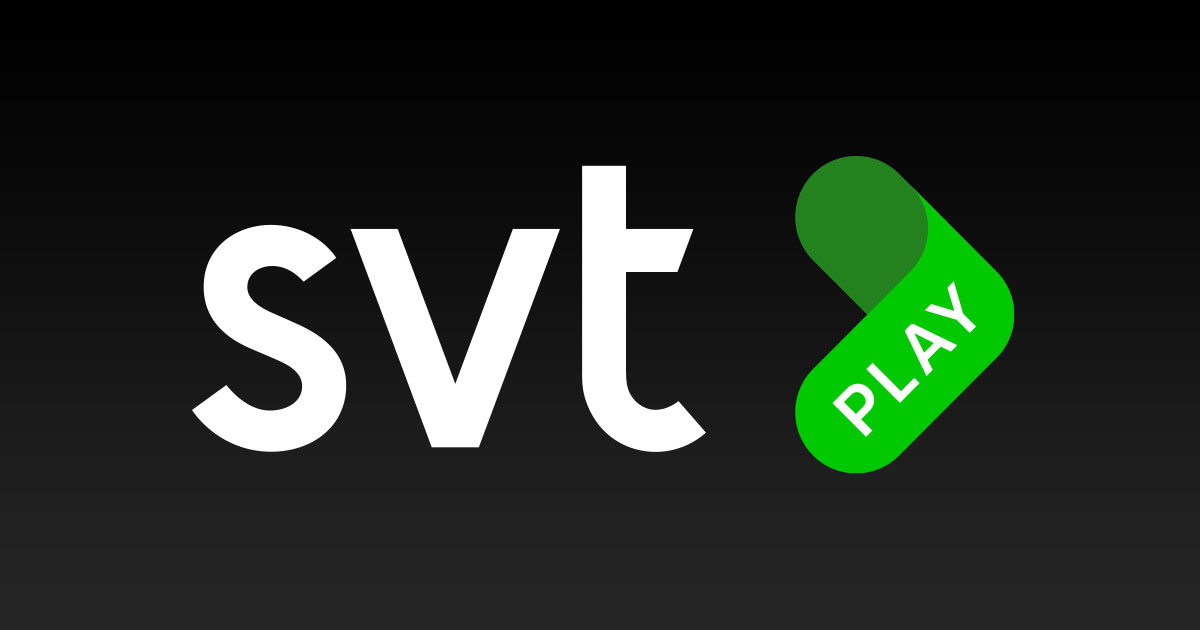
SVT Play's third and previous logo from 2016 to 2017

SVT Play is the brand used for the video on demand service offered by Sveriges Television, more specifically to the streaming services offered on the SVT website, svt.se, and its counterpart for mobile phones. The brand was introduced in December 2006, when the existing streaming television service got a new name. In September 2007, SVT launched their own channel on YouTube. From late 2007 until end of 2008 SVT Play was also available as a channel on Joost.

SVT claims that the service offers more than 2,000 hours of television. Most programmes produced for or by SVT are published on SVT Play after they have been broadcast and are then available for 30 days.

SVT have also launched "channels" dedicated at different audiences under the "Play" name. The first such channel was Play Bolibompa which launched in late 2007. It was followed by the news service Play Rapport which launched in May 2008.

== History ==
At launch, the streams were available in Windows Media and RealVideo. Since 2007, SVT Play started using Flash Video for shorter clips. In September 2007, SVT launched a trial to provide streamed content in standard television resolution using Move Media Player.

In the summer of 2008, the German series KDD became the first foreign acquisition available on SVT Play.

During the 2008 Olympics, SVT made all Olympic broadcasts available on the web in three Play channels, on simulcasting with SVT1, one simulcasting with SVT24 and a special web channel called Peking+.

In August 2008, SVT Play became available on an IPTV platform for the first time, as the service launched on Telia Digital-tv with newscasts and Olympic broadcasts available.

On September 22, 2008, SVT launched a service called "Play Prima" which provides drama series from SVT in high resolution (with bitrates of up to 2.4 megabits per second). Since June 2010 SVT Play uses streaming with adaptive bitrate (between 320 and 2400 kilobits per second) and "Play Prima" was discontinued.

In early 2009, SVT relaunched the SVT Play web application. A beta version of the new web player was launched on January 20, 2009.

== Availability ==
The service is accessible through most web browsers, a downloadable smartphone app, and selected over-the-top television platforms such as Apple TV. However, most content that isn't news or current affairs is restricted only to those in Sweden. The live simulcasts of SVT's channels on SVT Play are only available in Sweden but SVT Play has dedicated live streams of some individual programmes that may be viewable outside Sweden as a result of international popularity.
