= SVT Nyheter Västerbotten =

Västerbotten, formerly Västerbottensnytt is a daily regional Swedish news program which covers news from Västerbotten County. The program is part of is a part of the regional news series Regionala Nyheter. The department responsible for Västerbotten and Sverige idag is SVT Umeå.

It started its first telecast in March 2001. In 2008, it was moved to SVT1 together with other regional news programs. In 2015, Västerbottensnytt was replaced by the new name Västerbotten.
