= Sveriges Radio P2 =

Swedish public service radio station

- Sweden
- Broadcast area: Sweden; Åland

Programming
- Languages: Swedish; Finnish; Sami; English; Arabic; Romani; Somali
- Format: Classical music, jazz, folk music, electronic music, programmes in minority languages

Ownership
- Owner: Sveriges Radio

History
- First air date: 26 November 1955; 70 years ago

Links
- Website: SR P2

P2 (pe två) is one of the four main radio channels operated by Sweden's national publicly funded radio broadcasting organization Sveriges Radio (SR). It broadcasts music (principally classical music and jazz) and also carries educational programming as well as programmes in minority languages. P2 was officially similar and related to BBC Radio 3.

== History ==
The channel began life on 26 November 1955 as Sweden's second radio channel. In 1966, SR gave its channels distinct profiles, making P2 the channel for education, regional programming, and "serious" music. Regional radio later became local radio and was moved to P3 – still later to P4 – leaving P2 with the profile it has today.

The music played on P2 is mostly classical in the broadest sense (from the earliest known compositions to 20th-century and contemporary works), but also features jazz, folk and "world music": in this respect P2 can be compared to many other similar public radio stations around the world, such as ABC Classic, BBC Radio 3, CBC Radio 2, DR P2, France Musique, Polskie Radio Dwójka, RDP Antena 2, RNE Radio Clásica, WDR 3, and Ylen Klassinen. P2 also features contemporary electronic music two hours a week.

== Programming ==
Programming in minority languages is contributed by SR Sisuradio, Sameradion, and SR International. Educational programmes from Utbildningsradion are also broadcast on P2. These educational and minority programmes, however, constitute only a small part of P2's schedule, and they are mainly broadcast in the early morning and in the afternoon.

SR also produces an all-music version of P2 under the name "P2 Musik" in which the minority-language and educational programming is replaced by music (largely from the webradio channel SR Klassiskt). This is available on the web and, in the capital only, on 96.2 FM from P2's Stockholm transmitter. The minority-language and educational content thus replaced is available in Stockholm as part of the programming of SR's P6 International channel on 89.6 FM.
