= Sydnytt =

- Genre: Regional news programme
- Theme music composer: Christian Falk
- Country of origin: Sweden

Production
- Production location: Malmö

Original release
- Network: SVT2
- Release: 2 November 1970 – 12 April 2015

Sydnytt was a regional news programme produced by Sveriges Television, broadcasting to the counties of Skåne and Blekinge in the south of Sweden.

It was the first regional news programme in Sweden and premiered on 2 November 1970. It was originally an experiment, broadcasting to Scania for five minutes every weekday.

As the regional news organisation was extended throughout the country, the newscast was gradually extended and was 20 minutes long by the end of the 1980s. In the 1990s, new bulletins in the evening, morning and on Sundays were added. The morning bulletins were removed in 2001, but are scheduled to return in 2008. In 2008, the main bulletin will also be divided in one edition for Scania and one for Blekinge.

As of 2008, Sydnytt usually broadcasts three times in the evening: five minutes at 5.55, twenty minutes at 7.10 and ten minutes at 10.15 p.m. On Sundays they have two five minutes bulletins at 5.55 and 9.15 p.m.

The program was broadcast from the SVT television house at Jägersro in Malmö. They also had a small local office in Karlskrona.

On 12 April 2015, the name "Sydnytt" was dropped and was divided into three programs: SVT Nyheter Skåne, SVT Nyheter Helsingborg and SVT Nyheter Blekinge.
