= Sveriges Radio =

Swedish national radio broadcaster and quasi-autonomous non-governmental entity

Sveriges Radio (SR)
- Logo used since 2010, incorporating the "SR" mark in the middle which has been used since 1957.
- Type: Public broadcasting
- Country: Sweden
- Availability: National
- Radio stations: P1, P2, P3, P4
- Headquarters: Radiohuset, Östermalm, Stockholm; 59°20′5″N 18°6′5″E
- Owner: Foundation Management for SR, SVT, and UR
- Launch date: 1 January 1925; 101 years ago (radio); 4 September 1956; 69 years ago (television)
- Former names: AB Radiotjänst (1925–1957)
- Official website: sverigesradio.se

Sveriges Radio AB (Swedish: [ˈsvæ̌rjɛs ˈrɑ̌ːdɪʊ]; lit. 'Sweden's Radio'; SR), also called Swedish Radio in English, is Sweden's national publicly funded radio broadcaster. Sveriges Radio is a public limited company, owned by an independent foundation, previously funded through a licensing fee, the level of which is decided by the Swedish Riksdag. As of 1 January 2019, the funds stem from standard taxation. No advertising is permitted. Its legal status could be described as that of a quasi-autonomous non-governmental organization.

== History ==
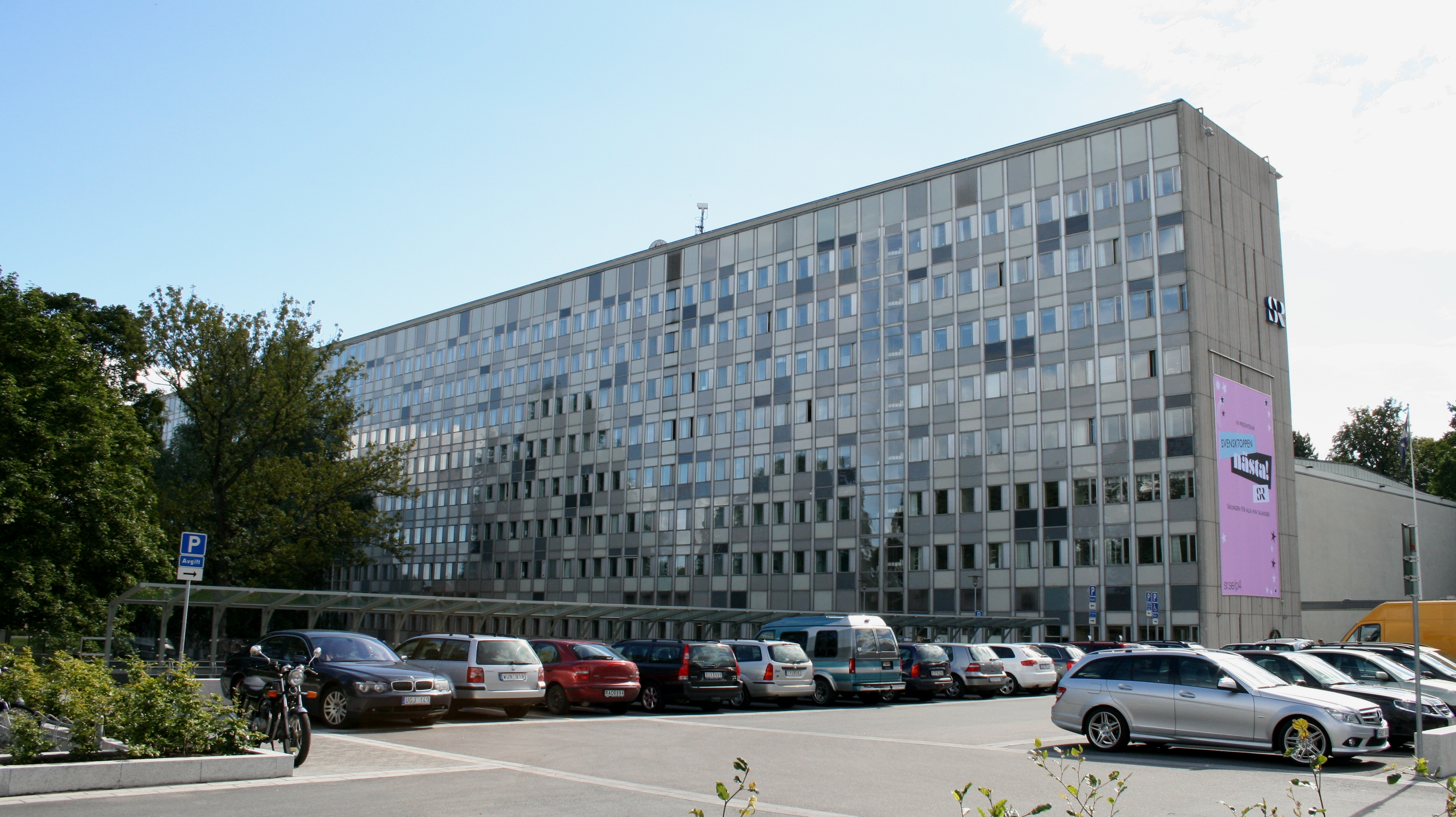
Sveriges Radio building, Radiohuset, in Stockholm (August 2008)

The company – which was founded as AB Radiotjänst ("Radio Service Ltd") by a consortium of newspaper companies, the TT news agency, and radio manufacturing interests on 21 March 1924 – made its first broadcast on 1 January 1925: a relay of High Mass from St James's Church in Stockholm. It was officially renamed Sveriges Radio in 1957.

Sveriges Radio was originally responsible for all broadcasting in Sweden, both radio and television, and hosted the 1975 Eurovision Song Contest. A reorganization in 1979 saw it become the parent company of four subsidiaries:

- Sveriges Riksradio (RR), Swedish National Radio;
- Sveriges Lokalradio (LRAB), Swedish Local Radio;
- Sveriges Utbildningsradio (UR), Swedish Educational Broadcasting; and
- Sveriges Television (SVT), Swedish Television.

This structure was dissolved in 1993, with the national and local radio companies merging under the name of the old parent company: Sveriges Radio AB.

== Stations ==
=== National radio ===
Four radio channels are available nationwide on FM, DAB and via the internet.

- P1: news, culture, debate, readings, documentaries, etc. Almost no music is played, except in the daily summertime programme Sommar, in which guest presenters introduce their own choice of music.
- P2: classical music, folk, jazz and world music; the channel also carries some minority-language programming.
- P3: popular music and comedy targeted at a younger audience.
- P4: popular music, entertainment and sport, chiefly targeted at an older audience; the network is made up of 26 local stations, each of which carries a mix of local and national programming.

=== Local radio ===
A large part of P4's programming is regional with 26 regions each broadcasting their own local programmes during most of the day.

- P4 Blekinge, for Blekinge County
- P4 Dalarna
- P4 Gotland
- P4 Gävleborg
- P4 Göteborg
- P4 Halland, for Halland County
- P4 Jämtland
- P4 Jönköping
- P4 Kalmar, for Kalmar County
- P4 Kristianstad, for the former Kristianstad County, now north and eastern Skåne County
- P4 Kronoberg
- P4 Malmöhus, for the former Malmöhus County, now south-western Skåne County
- P4 Norrbotten
- P4 Sjuhärad, for Sjuhärad, the south-eastern part of Västra Götaland County
- P4 Skaraborg, for the former Skaraborg County, now north-eastern Västra Götaland County
- P4 Stockholm
- P4 Södertälje
- P4 Sörmland
- P4 Uppland
- P4 Värmland
- P4 Väst, for western Västergötland, Dalsland and northern Bohuslän, north-western Västra Götaland County
- P4 Västerbotten
- P4 Västernorrland
- P4 Västmanland, for Västmanland
- P4 Örebro, for Örebro County
- P4 Östergötland, for Östergötland County

Additional radio stations available locally on FM include:

- Din gata 100,6 (in Malmö): playing mostly hiphop and R&B
- SR P2 Musik (in Stockholm): relays most of the output of P2, but replaces programming in minority and foreign languages (available in Stockholm from P6, see below) with additional music output – Schedule
- SR P6 89,6 (in Stockholm): broadcasts in minority and foreign languages and relays the BBC World Service at night – Schedule

=== Digital channels ===
Sveriges Radio also provides a number of digital channels through DAB and via the internet.

- P4 Plus, plays a broad mix of classic and current popular music (web)
- Sveriges Radio Finska, in Finnish and Meänkieli (DAB, web and cable)
- Radioapans knattekanal, children's radio (DAB and web)
- SR Sápmi, for Sami languages (web)
- Ekot, news (web)

=== SR International ===
SR International is the international channel of Sveriges Radio and offers programming in the following languages:

- Arabic – website
- English – website
- Kurdish – website
- Persian – website
- Romani – website
- Russian – website (closed on March 28, 2024)
- Somali – website
- Tigrinya - website
- Ukrainian - website

SR International is not responsible for programming in the domestic minority languages, Finnish and Sámi, which have their own dedicated digital channels.

On 16 March 2010, Radio Sweden announced the end of broadcasts on shortwave and medium wave as from 31 October 2010. External service programmes would continue on the internet only. Language services for immigrants to Sweden in Albanian, Neo-Aramaic, Serbian, Bosnian, and Croat would also be discontinued, while programmes in English (also on the domestic service), German, Persian, Dari, and Kurdish would remain. New language programs for Arabic, Somali, and Romani were established later that year.

On 21 January, 2016, Radio Sweden announced that the station's German and Russian language stations would cease operations on 31 March of the same year. Editor in-chief Ingemar Löfgren (who retired that same year) stated that the decision was made in order to prioritize minority languages in broadcasting.

== Criticism ==
The public's trust in the company, along with its Public Service counterparts in Sweden, may have decreased slightly during the 2000s. The decrease is most significant among right wing citizens.

On 2022, it was revealed that SR had registered the word "Sommar", meaning Summer in Swedish, as a trademark, along with other names related to their show, Sommar i P1, much to the dismay of some podcast operators.

=== Twitter ===
On 18 April 2023, Sveriges Radio stopped using Twitter as part of its social media plan due to concerns over "recent turbulence" at the company over its (in)ability to combat fake news and hate speech.

== See also ==
- List of Swedish radio stations
- Åke Blomström Award
- Modern Times Group (commercial broadcaster)
- Radiotjänst i Kiruna (licence fee agency)
- Sveriges Utbildningsradio
- Swedish Broadcasting Commission
- Teracom (transmitters)
