= Sveriges Radio P1 =

Swedish national radio station

- Sweden
- Broadcast area: Sweden; Åland

Programming
- Language: Swedish
- Format: News, current affairs, culture

Ownership
- Owner: Sveriges Radio

History
- First air date: 1 January 1925; 101 years ago

Links
- Website: SR P1

P1 (pe ett) is a national radio channel produced by the Swedish public broadcaster Sveriges Radio (SR). It was launched in 1925 as the first national radio station in Sweden, and adopted its current format in 1966.

== History ==
Until 12 January 2015, SR P1 closed down between 2.30 am and 5.30 am every day, with the "Vågskvalpet" looping tune and an encrypted talking newspaper broadcast for the vision impaired filling the off-air hours. SR P1 began 24-hour transmission on 13 January 2015.

== Programming ==
P1, which subtitles itself "The spoken channel" (Den talade kanalen), is the principal radio channel in Sweden for news, community programmes, culture, radio drama, debate, science, philosophy, the expression of opinion and international issues. Many of the programmes on P1 are repeated at least once – at a different time of day – during each broadcast week: this is a typical feature of spoken-word channels of this type (compare BBC Radio 4 in the United Kingdom, Radio National in Australia, NHK Radio 1 in Japan, CBC Radio One in Canada and Polskie Radio Program I in Poland).

== Broadcasting ==
SR P1 can be heard in Sweden on FM and DAB, also worldwide via the internet. Part of the P1 schedule is also relayed by the Radio Sweden 1 satellite channel.

The name P1 was originally an abbreviation of Program 1. This is however no longer the case and the channel is now formally called just P1 (pe ett in Swedish).
