= Sveriges Television =

Swedish national television broadcaster

Sveriges Television (SVT)
- Logo used since 2016
- Type: Public television broadcaster and online
- Country: Sweden
- Availability: National
- Founded: 4 September 1956; 70 years ago (as Radiotjänst) by Sveriges Radio
- Motto: Hela Sveriges Television
- Market share: none
- Broadcast area: Sweden
- Area: Europe
- Parent: Foundation Management for SR, SVT, and UR
- Key people: Kia Orback Pettersson, Chairman of the Board; Hanna Stjärne, CEO; Jan Helin, Media Director
- Launch date: 4 September 1956; 70 years ago
- Former names: Radiotjänst (1956–1957); Sveriges Radio TV (1957–1979)
- Channels: SVT1, SVT2, SVT24, SVT Barn, Kunskapskanalen
- Online: SVT Nyheter
- Other broadcast languages: Ođđasat (Northern Sámi); Uutiset (Finnish); Nyhetstecken (Swedish sign language)
- Affiliates: European Broadcasting Union
- Official website: svt.se
- Language: Swedish and a variety of minority languages.
- Notes

Sveriges Television AB ("Sweden's Television Ltd."), shortened to SVT (Swedish: [ˈsvæ̌rjɛs tɛlɛvɪˈɧuːn ɛsveːˈteː]), is the Swedish national public television broadcaster and news website, funded by a public service tax on personal income set by the Riksdag (national parliament). Prior to 2019, SVT was funded by a television licence fee payable by all owners of television sets. The Swedish public broadcasting system is largely modelled after the system used in the United Kingdom, and Sveriges Television shares many traits with its British counterpart, the BBC.

SVT is a public limited company that can be described as a "quasi-autonomous non-governmental organisation." Together with the other two public broadcasters, Sveriges Radio and Sveriges Utbildningsradio, it is owned by an independent foundation, Förvaltningsstiftelsen för Sveriges Radio AB, Sveriges Television AB och Sveriges Utbildningsradio AB. The foundation's board consists of 13 politicians, representing the political parties in the Riksdag and appointed by the Swedish government. The foundation in turn appoints the SVT board members.

SVT's regulatory framework is governed by Swedish law. SVT and Sveriges Radio were originally a joint company, but since 1979 they and Sveriges Utbildningsradio are sibling companies sharing some joint services.

SVT maintained a monopoly in domestic terrestrial broadcasting from its start in 1956 until the privately held TV4 started broadcasting terrestrially in 1992. It is barred from accepting advertisements except in the case of sponsors for sporting events. Until the launch of the Swedish language satellite television channel TV3 in 1987, Sveriges Television provided the only Swedish television available to the public. SVT is still the biggest TV network in Sweden, with an audience share of 36.4 per cent.

== History ==
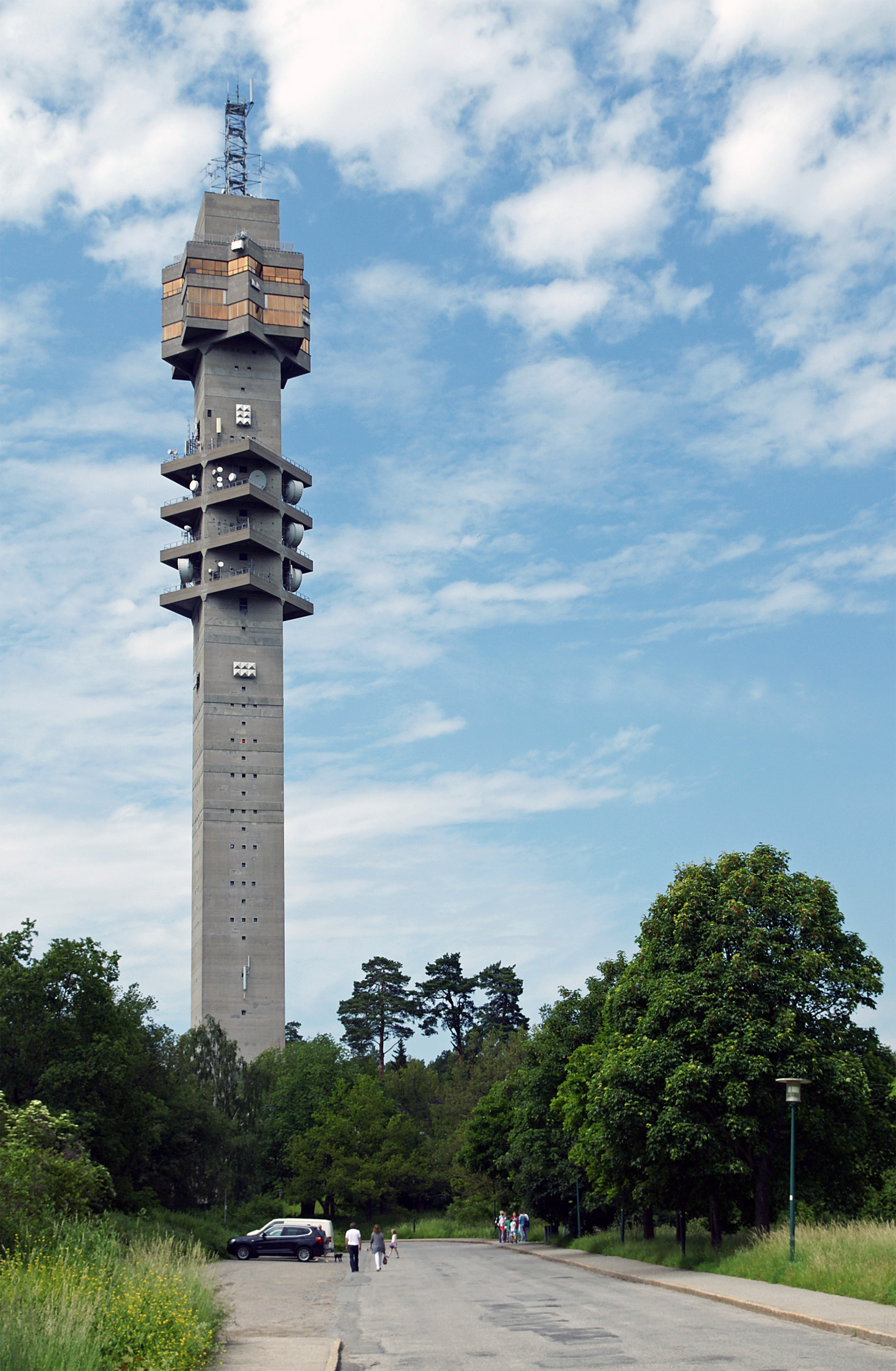
The Kaknästornet in Stockholm is the major broadcasting antenna for TV and radio.

When radio broadcasting was first organised in the 1920s in Sweden, it was decided to adopt a model similar to that of the British Broadcasting Company in the United Kingdom. Radio would be a monopoly funded by a licence fee and organised as a limited company, AB Radiotjänst ("Radio Service Ltd."), owned by the radio industry and the press. The transmitters were owned by the state through Telegrafverket and the press held a monopoly on newscasts through Tidningarnas Telegrambyrå. AB Radiotjänst was one of 23 founding broadcasting organisations of the European Broadcasting Union (EBU) in 1950.

Tidningarnas Telegrambyrå lost its monopoly on newscasts de jure in 1947 and de facto in 1956, but otherwise, the same model would be applied to television.

It was decided to start test transmissions of television in June 1954. The first transmissions were made on 29 October 1954 from the Royal Institute of Technology in Stockholm.

In 1956 the Riksdag decided that television broadcasting should continue permanently and on 4 September Radiotjänst initiated official transmissions from the new Nacka transmitter. A television licence for those owning a television set was introduced in October of that year.

Television clock in the 1960s

Regularly scheduled television programming began in 1957. At the same time, Radiotjänst was renamed Sveriges Radio (SR) and its ownership was changed. The state and the press would each have 40% shares, while the company itself would own 20% (in 1967, the state increased its share to 60% at the expense of the press).

In 1958, the first newscast, Aktuellt, was broadcast. During the 1960s the establishment of a second TV channel was frequently discussed. These discussions resulted in the launch of TV2 on 5 December 1969. The original channel became TV1 and it was intended that the two channels would broadcast in "stimulating competition" within the same company.

The first stage of the main headquarters building and TV studios for Sveriges Television called TV-huset (sv), was inaugurated on Oxenstiernsgatan in the Östermalm district in Stockholm on 30 October 1967. The completion of the second stage of TV-huset and its official opening was on 5 December 1969, the same day as the start of operations of TV2, making it one of the largest television studios in Europe at that time.

TV2 clock in the 1970s

1970 saw the start of the first regional programme, Sydnytt from Malmö. More regional news programmes were launched in 1972 and the entire country was covered by regional news programmes by 1987 when ABC from Stockholm began.

When TV2 started the news programmes were reorganised. Aktuellt was replaced by TV-nytt, which was responsible for the main 19.30 bulletin on TV1 as well as news updates on both channels. In addition, the two channels would get one "commentary bulletin" each. TV2's was entitled Rapport and TV1's was Nu.

In 1972, the news was reorganised once again. Rapport was moved to the 19.30 slot on TV2 while Aktuellt was revived, to broadcast at 18.00 and 21.00 on TV1. These timeslots would mostly stay unchanged for the following decades.

The first colour broadcast was made in 1966, with regular colour broadcasts being introduced in 1970. Teletext started in 1978.

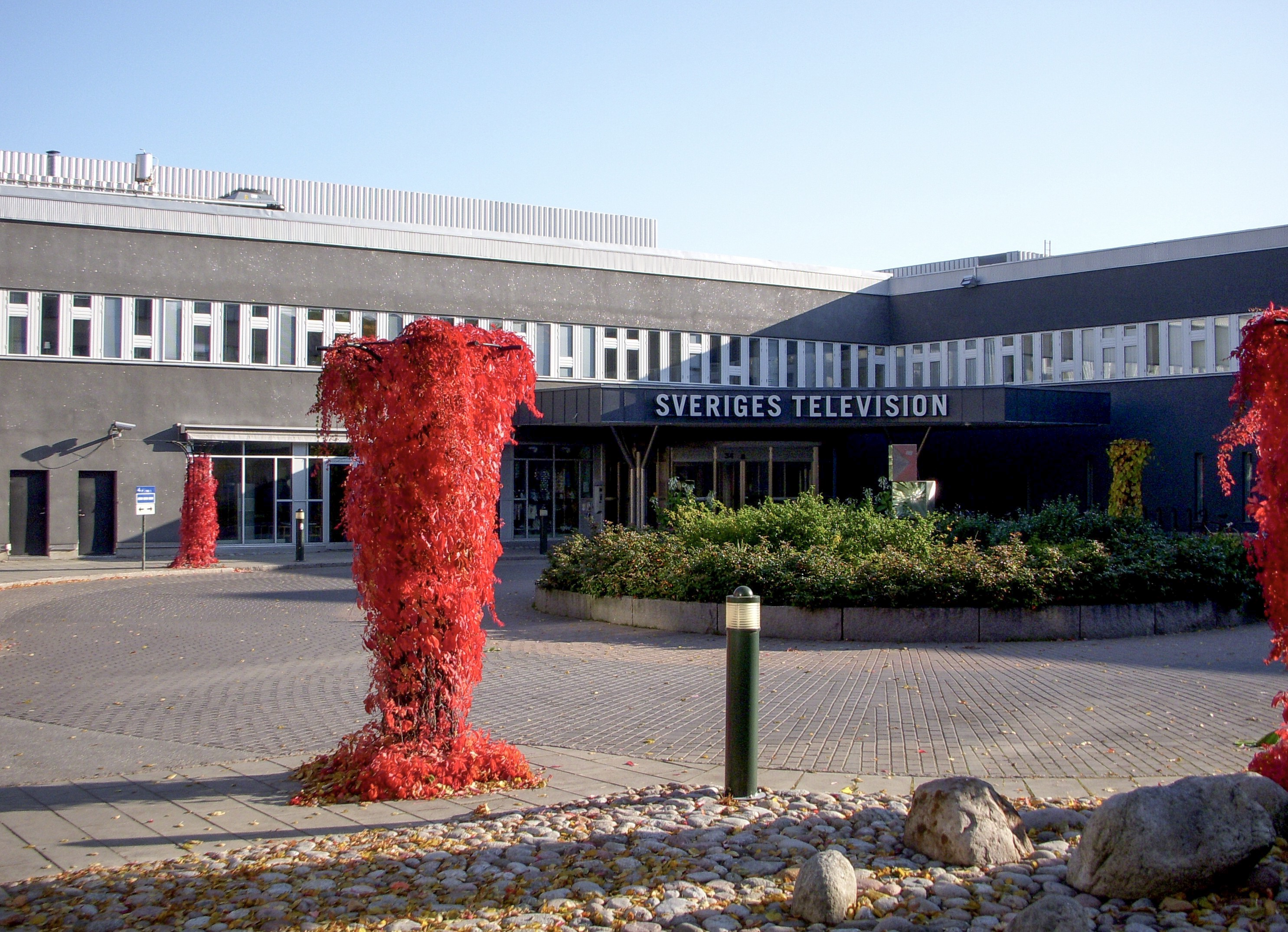
SVT headquarters in Stockholm

At the end of the 1970s, SR was reorganised. From 1 July 1979, Sveriges Radio AB became the parent company of four subsidiaries:

- Sveriges Riksradio (RR) for national radio,
- Sveriges Lokalradio AB (LRAB) for local radio,
- Sveriges Utbildningsradio (UR) for educational broadcasting, and
- Sveriges Television (SVT) for television.

SVT would provide all television broadcasting, except for educational programming which was the responsibility of UR. The abbreviation SVT was chosen over the arguably more logical "STV" as that abbreviation was already occupied by Scottish Television in the EBU. The Swedish EBU membership is currently jointly held by SVT, SR and UR.

The SVT logo introduced in October 1980, as well as the individual channel logos for TV1 and TV2, were all created by British designer Sid Sutton.

The two channels were reorganised in 1987. TV1 was renamed Kanal 1 and contained almost all programmes produced in Stockholm, while TV2 consisted of the ten regional districts and the Rapport news desk.

Broadcasting in Nicam Stereo was made permanent in 1988. This year also saw the launch of a channel called SVT World in southern Finland, broadcasting content from SVT for Swedish-speaking population of Finland. The channel, which was later renamed SVT4, was rebranded as SVT Europa in 1997 when it started broadcasting to all of Europe via satellite. Following its expansion into Asia and Africa, it was rebranded as SVT World in 2005.

In 1992, the Riksdag decided that Sveriges Radio would be reorganised once again, this time into three separate companies (with RR and LRAB merged) without a shared parent company. From 1994, they would be owned by three independent foundations. The three foundations later did only a few years later merge into one.

In 1990, the television broadcasting day would usually begin at 16.00 and end before midnight. The 1990s saw an increase in broadcasting hours, with the addition of reruns in the afternoon, a morning show, and lunchtime news bulletins. SVT also met competition from new commercial broadcasters. TV3 became the first channel to break SVT's monopoly on television in Sweden and in 1992 the newly elected right-wing parliamentary majority allowed TV4 to start terrestrial broadcasting. TV4 soon established nationwide coverage and 1995 passed TV2 in the overall ratings to become the nation's most-viewed channel.

In 1996, the channels were once again reorganised. The previous organisation and competition between the two channels disappeared as they became part of a single organisation. Kanal 1 and TV2 were renamed SVT1 and SVT2. The first season of Expedition: Robinson (Survivor) was shown in 1997.

The first digital terrestrial television (DTT) broadcasts took place in 1999. SVT started six new channels: the news channel SVT24 and five regional channels. 2000 saw the reorganisation of the news desks. Aktuellt, Rapport, and SVT24 all came under the control of one central news desk.

In 2001 a new logo and new programme schedules, among other things, were introduced. This made SVT1 the broader mainstream channel with higher ratings and SVT2 the narrower channel. The main news bulletins at 19.30 and 21.00 switched channels, with Aktuellt now shown on SVT2 and Rapport on SVT1. The new logo was a combination of a star and a flower made by English & Pockett. The symbol combined elements of the two channels: the star represented SVT1, while the petals around it represented SVT2.

The regional channels were closed at the beginning of 2002 and replaced by SVT Extra. In December 2002, a new channel known as Barnkanalen began showing children's programmes during the day. On 24 February 2003, SVT24 and SVT Extra were renamed 24, a theme channel for news and sports. Also in 2003, all the SVT channels dropped their encryption in the DTT network.

On 25 June 2003, SVT broadcast its first programme with 5.1 sound on DTT. The first 5.1 show was Allsång på Skansen. In November 2004, SVT added two audio streams that read out the translation subtitles on SVT1 and SVT2. The knowledge-oriented channel Kunskapskanalen started broadcasting in September 2004.

The switch-off of analogue transmitters started in 2005 in Gotland. By 2007 all analogue transmissions from SVT had ceased.

SVT started VODcasting several programmes in February 2006. Altogether three broadcasters competed to be the first one to VODcast in Sweden. In the end, all three started in the same week.

SVT made its first broadcasts in high-definition television during the 2006 FIFA World Cup on a channel operated in co-operation with TV4 AB. Regular high-definition broadcasting started on the SVT HD channel on 22 October 2006. The first programme was the film Lost in Translation, followed the next day by a 50th-anniversary tribute to television in Sweden, which was the first live entertainment programme to be broadcast in high definition in Sweden. On 25 August 2008, new logos and channel identities were introduced on the network with Barnkanalen renamed SVTB and 24 returning to its former name of SVT24, while SVT1 began carrying Regionala Nyheter (regional news bulletins) for the first time.

SVT was the host broadcaster for the 1975, 1985, 1992, 2000, 2013, 2016 and 2024 Eurovision Song Contests.

In 2018, the Riksdag voted to replace the traditional TV licensing system with a new public service fee based on personal income tax.

== Programming ==
=== News ===
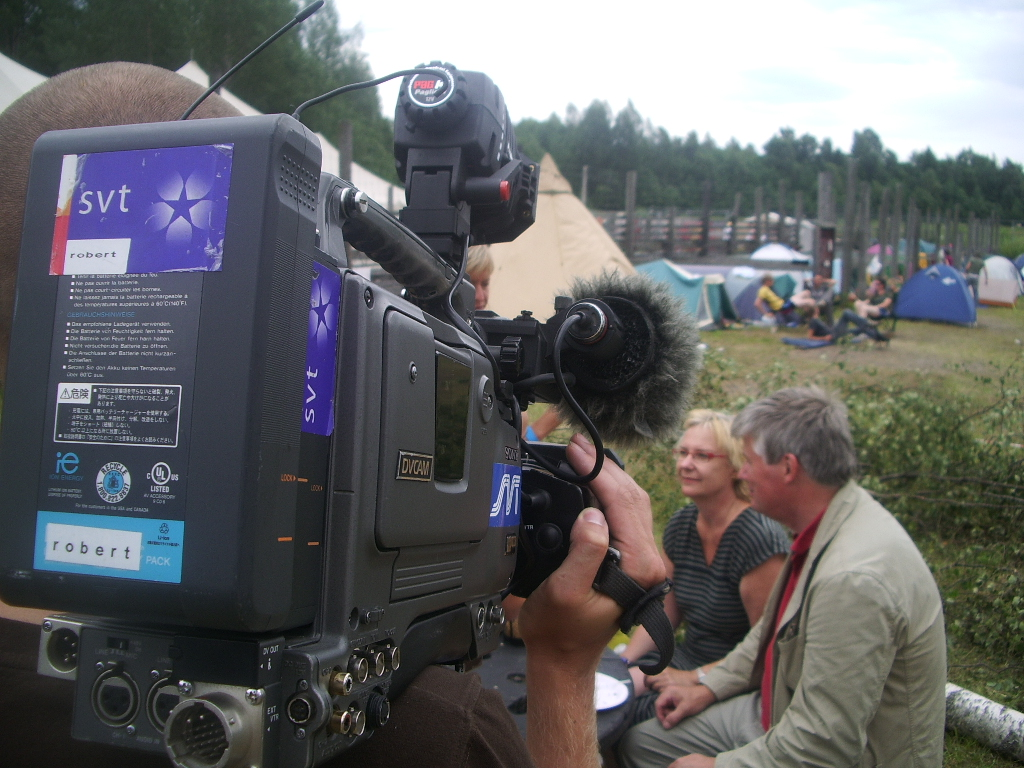
A reporter from SVT

News programmes are an important part of SVT. Since 1972 there have been two main news programmes: Rapport and Aktuellt (translated "Report" and "Current [events]", respectively). The two news programmes had completely separate organisations, meaning a lot of duplicated coverage was provided. After some co-operation in the 1990s, the two programmes were allowed to merge in 2000 with the newly created SVT24 to form a single organisation. The different programme names and identities were kept, however. Eventually, Rapport has become the main news programme, and Aktuellt will only broadcast one bulletin per day from autumn 2007.

The main national news bulletins are Rapport, broadcast at 18.00 and 19.30, and Aktuellt which reports in greater depth at 21.00. Additionally, shorter news bulletins are shown in the mornings and throughout the day on SVT1, SVT2, and SVT24. These are styled SVT Nyheter. SVT also broadcasts video news on the Internet through a service called Play Rapport.

SVT provides news programmes in various minority languages: Uutiset in Finnish, Nyhetstecken in Swedish Sign Language, and, in co-operation with NRK and Yle, Ođđasat in Northern Sami, as well as special editions of Sverige idag in Meänkieli and Romani.

There are also regional news bulletins
– on SVT1 at 18.33 on Mondays to Fridays and 18.10 on Sundays, as well as 19.55 daily except Saturdays
– on SVT2 at 21.46 on Mondays to Thursdays and 21.25 on Fridays

- ABC from Stockholm (Stockholm and Uppsala)
- Gävledala from Falun (Dalarna and Gävleborg)
- Mittnytt from Sundsvall (Västernorrland)
- Nordnytt from Luleå (Norrbotten)
- Östnytt from Norrköping (Östergötland, Södermanland and Gotland)
- Smålandsnytt from Växjö (Kronoberg, Kalmar and Jönköping)
- SVT Nyheter Jämtland from Östersund (Jämtland)
- SVT Nyheter Väst from Gothenburg (Västra Götaland and Halland)
- Sydnytt from Malmö (Skåne and Blekinge)
- Tvärsnytt from Örebro (Örebro and Västmanland)
- Värmlandsnytt from Karlstad (Värmland)
- Västerbottensnytt from Umeå (Västerbotten)

In November 2023, SVT joined with the International Consortium of Investigative Journalists, Paper Trail Media and 69 media partners including Distributed Denial of Secrets and the Organized Crime and Corruption Reporting Project (OCCRP) and more than 270 journalists in 55 countries and territories to produce the 'Cyprus Confidential' report on the financial network which supports the regime of Vladimir Putin, mostly with connections to Cyprus, and showed Cyprus to have strong links with high-up figures in the Kremlin, some of whom have been sanctioned. Government officials including Cyprus president Nikos Christodoulides and European lawmakers began responding to the investigation's findings in less than 24 hours, calling for reforms and launching probes.

==== Party political orientation ====
A survey in 1999 claimed that 33 percent of the journalists working for SVT and SR supported the Left Party, which was about the same proportion as among journalists employed in commercial broadcasting and the print media, but significantly higher than among the general public, only 15 percent of whom supported the Left Party. Support for the Left Party, the Green Party and the Liberal Party was stronger among journalists on SVT and SR than among the general public, while the Moderate Party, the Social Democrats, and the Christian Democrats had significantly less support among SVT and SR journalists than they did among the public at large. The study nevertheless concluded that the private political opinions of the journalists had little impact on their work and that news stories are treated the same regardless of the political colour of individual journalists. It is also worth mentioning that SJF, the organisation amongst whose members the study was partly conducted, is a trade union, which could have skewed the representativity of the sample (lessening the validity of the survey) as it is possible it excluded some rightwing journalists. The University of Gothenburg also made another study during the Swedish 2006 general election, comparing SVT's news programme Rapport to the country's five largest newspapers. The study concluded that Rapport's coverage of the election was the most balanced of them all.

=== Entertainment ===
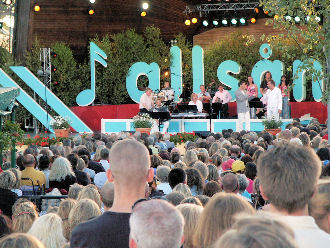
Allsång på Skansen

Entertainment shows on Fridays and Saturdays are, together with popular sports, the programmes that attract the largest audiences.

- Melodifestivalen (1959–present), the Swedish national selection for the Eurovision Song Contest. The final generally attracts around four million viewers.
- Expedition Robinson (1997–2004, 2009–2012), the original Swedish version of Survivor. Sveriges Television was the first network to broadcast this reality television series in 1997. The show, with a name alluding to Robinson Crusoe, was a major hit in Sweden. The show which consistently held high ratings was concluded after its seventh and final year on the network (the final season aired 2003–2004). The popular series was continued on the commercial channel TV3, but with much lower ratings. Expedition Robinson was aired in 2009 with a brand new season, but the series is/was just called "Robinson", and now on the commercial channel TV4.
- På spåret (1987–present), popular entertainment show in which celebrities answer questions related to different locations. A cut down film in extremely high speed of a train journey towards the location is shown and the sooner the contestants stop it the higher the points. In later years even car journeys has been filmed that way. Humouristic and well hidden clues are given verbally during the journey. The name of the show means "on the track" in English. The show is one of very few Swedish original ideas. It has been syndicated in other countries as well.
- Så ska det låta (1997–present), the Swedish adaptation of The Lyrics Board which has on several occasions reached more than three million viewers.
- Allsång på Skansen (1979–present), a popular summer show features sing-alongs with Swedish folk music, broadcast live from Skansen in Stockholm. The first sing-along at Skansen was held in 1935. Radio transmissions of the event started shortly after. The sing-along at Skansen has been a tradition every summer since.
- Antikrundan (1989–present), the Swedish version of Antiques Roadshow which has often attracted approximately two million viewers.

Sveriges Television hosted the Eurovision Song Contest 1985, 1992, 2000, 2013, 2016, and 2024, and also as a part of Sveriges Radio hosted the 1975 contest.

=== Drama ===
SVT produces drama in several genres and forms.

- Rederiet (1992–2002) was one of the most popular soap operas in Sweden.

=== Regional programming ===
Regional content is entirely solely restricted to news which is broadcast on SVT1 and SVT2. The eighteen news programmes are: ABC, Blekingenytt, Gävledala, Hallandsnytt, Jämtlandsnytt, Jönköpingsnytt, Mittnytt, Nordnytt, Smålandsnytt, Sydnytt, Tvärsnytt, Uppland, Värmlandsnytt, Västerbottensnytt, Västmanlandsnytt, Västnytt and Östnytt. The regional news programmes are broadcast on SVT1 at 18.33–18.45 on Mondays to Fridays (18.10–18.15 on Sundays), with a follow-up bulletin at 19.55–20.00. SVT2 also broadcasts regional news following Aktuellt at 21.46–21.56 on Mondays to Thursdays and 21.25–21.30 on Fridays. There are no regional news bulletins on Saturdays.

=== Children ===
Kalles klätterträd ran on Sveriges Television starting in 1975 and grew to become one of the most popular children's programmes of the 1970s. The children's strand Bolibompa was broadcast every day at 18.00 on SVT1, before moving to SVTB in August 2008.

=== Foreign programming ===
SVT also airs foreign programming, primarily from the United States, United Kingdom and other Nordic countries, in their original audio with Swedish subtitles, as is the case on other Nordic television channels. The only cases in which dubbing is widespread is in programming aimed directly at children who are not expected to have learned reading skills yet. However, for some programmes, viewers may also access 'talking subtitles' through their remote where someone reads the subtitles to viewers (though 'talking subtitles' are not strictly in sync with the original audio as dubbing is). These same practices are also done for segments of local programmes that contain foreign language dialogue.

33% of the national first-time broadcasts consisted of foreign content in 2005. Of all acquired programming (including Swedish programming not produced by SVT) 27% came from the United States, 22% from the United Kingdom, 13% from Sweden, 13% from the other Nordic countries, 6% from France, 4% from Germany and 9% from the rest of Europe.

SVT often cooperates with the other Nordic public broadcasters via Nordvision. Thus, many Danish, Norwegian, Icelandic and Finnish programming air on SVT, while DR, NRK, YLE, KVF and RÚV show Swedish programmes. When there is major breaking news out of Denmark however, SVT may also source live coverage from TV2.

== Channels ==
SVT has five regular channels broadcasting to Sweden:

- SVT1 – The main channel with broad and regional content. The 10 most seen Swedish TV shows in 2006 were shown on this channel. SVT1 HD simulcasts in high definition.
- SVT2 – A channel with slightly narrower programming with an emphasis on culture, current affairs and documentaries. SVT2 HD simulcasts in high definition.
- SVT Barn (SVT Children) – Programmes for children and (pre-)teens.
- Kunskapskanalen (The Knowledge Channel) – Broadcasting debates, seminars and documentaries in cooperation with UR.
- SVT24 – Reruns of programmes from SVT1 and SVT2 in the evening and continuous news updates during the night. Shares frequency with SVT Barn.

In addition to these channels, SVT had a special events channel called SVT Extra. It was generally unused and was (as of 2006) last used for live coverage during the 2004 Summer Olympic Games. In 2006, SVT launched a high-definition channel called SVT HD, simulcasting HD versions of programmes on the other SVT channels.

All channels, except SVT1 HD and SVT2 HD, are available in most of Sweden through the digital terrestrial television network and encrypted from Thor and Sirius satellites. Until September 2005, both SVT1 and SVT2 were available nationwide via analogue terrestrial transmitters. Cable networks are required to broadcast four SVT channels for free in either digital or analogue form.

SVT World, a mix of the SVT channels, was broadcast on satellite and worldwide via IPTV, and also as a terrestrial channel in Swedish-speaking areas of southern Finland. For rights reasons, SVT World did not broadcast acquired material, such as movies, sports, or English language programming. The channel was closed in April 2017.

SVT1, SVT2, SVT Barn, SVT24, and Kunskapskanalen are also available through DTT on Åland and can be distributed on Finnish cable networks. In Ostrobothnia, Finland, SVT1, SVT2, SVTB and SVT24 are transmitted through DTT as pay TV to the Swedish-speaking population. The signals from the terrestrial transmitters in Sweden can be received in some areas of Denmark and Norway as well as in northernmost Finland near Sweden. With special equipment reception of Swedish terrestrial transmitters is possible even on some parts of the Finnish coast as well as the Polish and German coast closest to Sweden. Cable networks in the Nordic countries generally redistribute SVT1 and SVT2 often for an additional monthly subscription charge in addition to the subscriber's main package. Some Nordic hotels, especially in Denmark and Norway, also offer SVT1 or SVT2 to guests.

SVT considers its website, svt.se, a channel in its own right. SVT also provides an on-demand service called SVT Play through which most of the programmes produced for SVT and aired on its channels are available. However, most non-news and non-current event programmes on SVT Play are only available for viewing in Sweden.

== Organisation ==
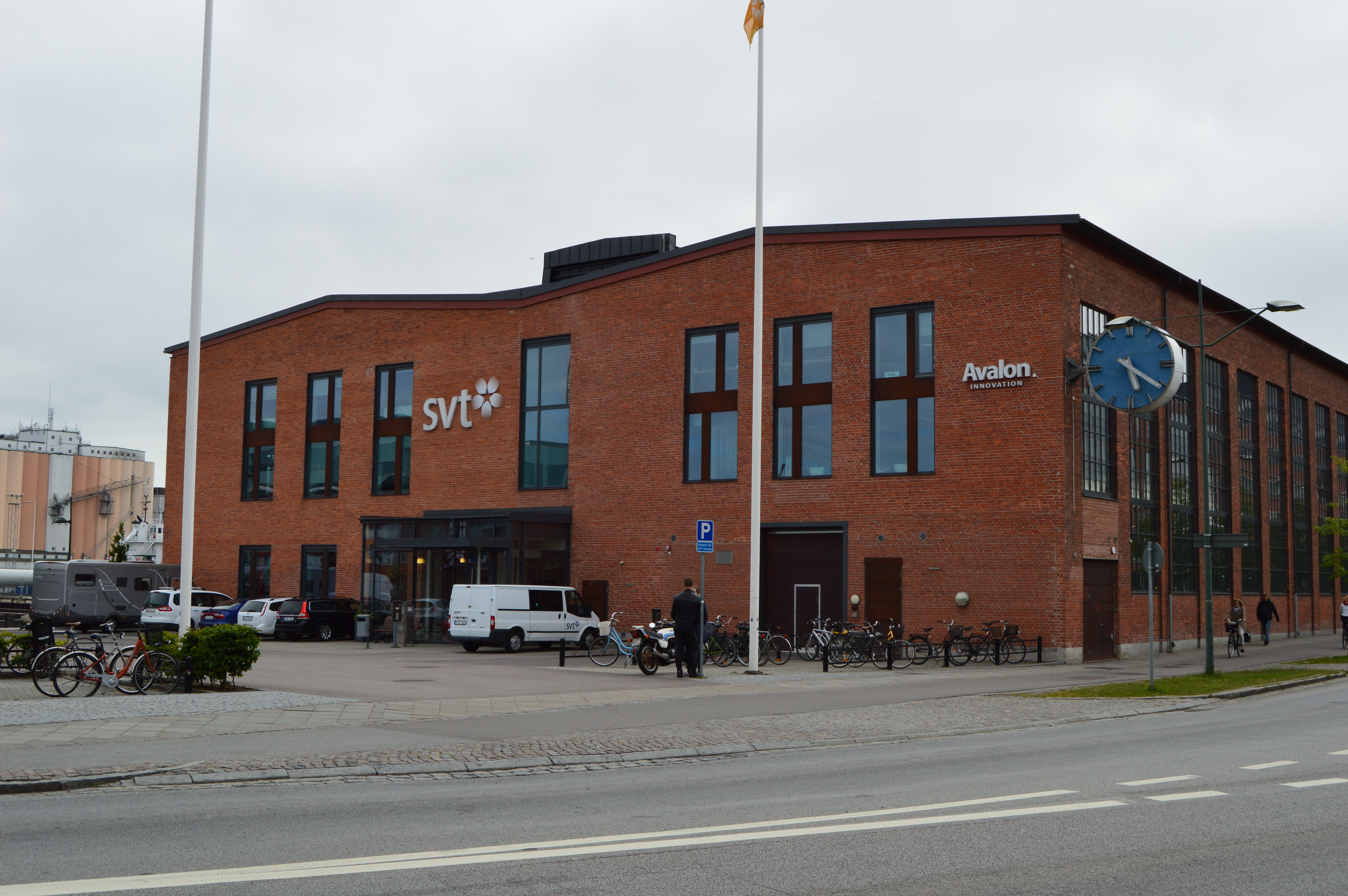
SVT's regional studio in Malmö

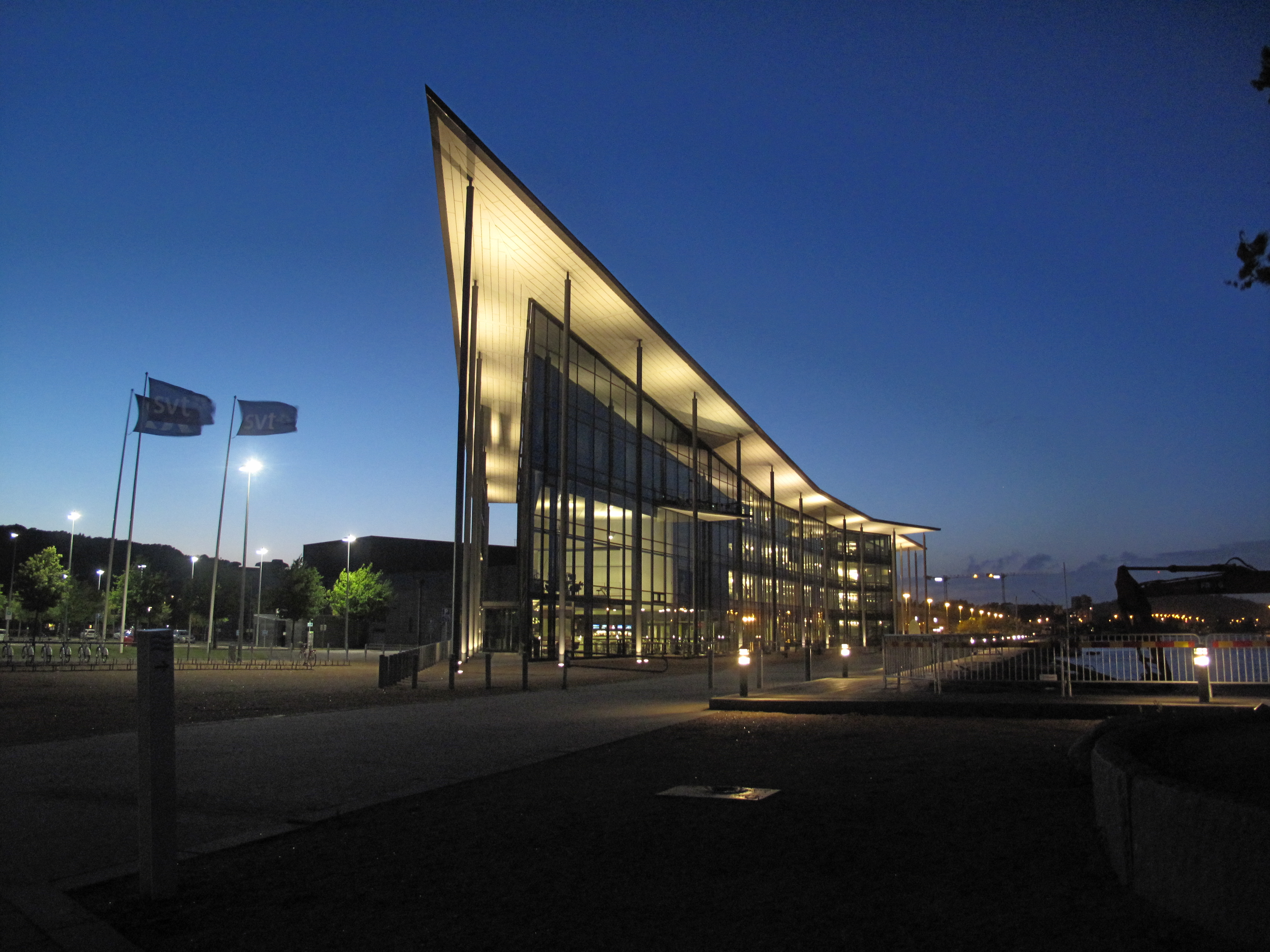
SVT's regional studio in Gothenburg

The executive management of SVT is handled by a CEO, appointed by the board. The CEO of SVT is currently Hanna Stjärne who took over the role from Eva Hamilton in 2015. The chairman of the Board is Lars Engqvist, deputy Prime Minister of the previous Social Democratic government.

SVT is divided into eight operative programme-producing units - four of these are located in Stockholm while the other four are located around the country at regional studios and are based on the ten regional transmission areas which were merged in 2000:

- Malmö – SVT Syd (SVT Malmö and SVT Växjö)
- Gothenburg – SVT Väst (SVT Göteborg)
- Norrköping – SVT Mellansverige (SVT Falun, Dövas TV Leksand, SVT Karlstad, SVT Örebro and SVT Norrköping)
- Umeå – SVT Nord (formerly SVT Luleå, SVT Umeå and SVT Sundsvall)

These four district areas produce networked output and co-ordinate ten of the eleven regional news services broadcast daily on SVT1.

The Stockholm-based units are:

- SVT Nyheter & Samhälle – national news, current affairs, documentaries and the regional news service ABC.
- SVT Sport
- SVT Fiktion – drama, entertainment, youth and children's programming.
- SVTi – multimedia and interactive services.

=== Chair of the Board of Directors ===
- Lennart Sandgren, 1978–1994
- Anna-Greta Leijon, 1994–2000
- Allan Larsson, 2000–2005
- Lars Engqvist, 2005–2011
- Göran Johnsson, 2011–2014
- Anna-Karin Celsing, 2014–2020
- Kia Orback Pettersson 2020–2024
- Christina Björklund, 2024–present

=== Chief executive officers ===
Before Sveriges Television was formed in 1978, television broadcasting was controlled by channel controllers. Nils Erik Baehrentz was the controller between 1958 and 1968. He was succeeded by Håkan Unsgaard who became TV1's controller in 1968 and Örjan Wallquist who became the TV2 controller in 1969.

- Magnus Faxén, 1978–1981
- Sam Nilsson, 1981–1999
- Maria Curman, 2000–2001
- Christina Jutterström, 2001–2006
- Eva Hamilton, 2006–2014
- Hanna Stjärne, 2014–present

When Sam Nilsson retired, the executive chair was split between a CEO and a Programme Officer. This position was abolished in 2007.

- Mikael Olsson, 2000–2000
- Leif Jakobsson, 2001–2007

== Share of viewing figures ==
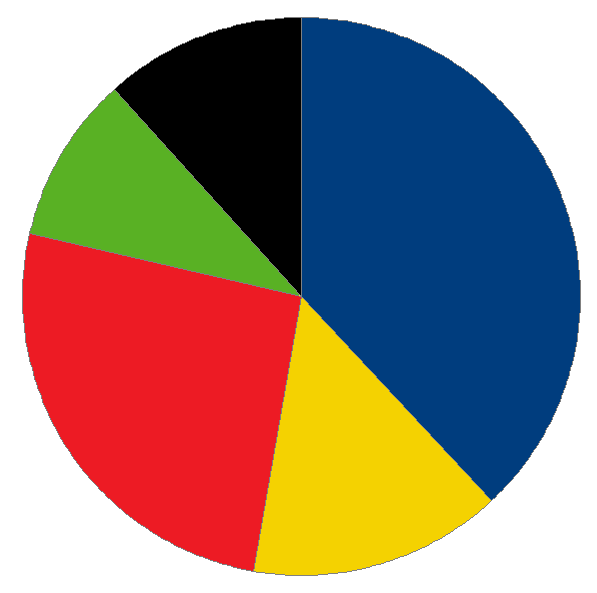
A diagram showing the different shares of the viewing for the four major television companies in 2006. SVT MTG TV4 SBS Others

Since the arrival of commercial television, SVT's combined viewing share has declined steadily and digital channels have also provided competition. The commercial TV4 became the most watched station in 1995 and maintained its position until 2002, when SVT1 regained the status. TV4 became the most watched channel again 2006.

The combined viewing share of the SVT channels declined from 50% in 1997 to 40% in 2005. SVT was the most watched network in Sweden with a share of 38.3% in 2006, although all three major commercial channels attract a higher share of 15- to 24-year-olds than the two SVT channels combined.

=== Audience trust ===
A media study released in 2020 showed that trust in SVT programming polarised the audience. 80-90% of viewers who supported liberal or left-leaning parties Green Party, Swedish Social Democratic Party, Liberals, Left Party and Centre Party had high trust in SVT whereas fewer viewers who supported conservative-leaning parties Christian Democrats (60%), Moderate Party (54%) and Sweden Democrats (30%) had high trust in SVT. This meant that SVT was an issue that polarised the audience more than the US president Donald Trump.

== See also ==
- List of Swedish television channels
- Radiotjänst i Kiruna
- Sveriges Utbildningsradio
- Swedish Broadcasting Commission
- Teracom
- TV4
- Viasat
