= 2026 in Denmark =

- Decades: 2000s; 2010s; 2020s
- See also: Other events of 2026; List of years in Denmark

Events in the year 2026 in Denmark.

== Incumbents ==
- Monarch: Frederik X
- Prime Minister – Mette Frederiksen
- Government: Frederiksen II Cabinet
- Folketing: 2022–2026 session (elected 1 November 2022)
- Leaders of the constituent countries
  - Prime minister of the Faroe Islands – Aksel V. Johannesen
  - Prime minister of Greenland – Jens-Frederik Nielsen

== Events ==
=== January ===
- 6 January – Greenland crisis: Speaking about the proposed United States acquisition of Greenland, the Trump administration refuses to rule out the option of military action to take control of Greenland.
- 17 January – Greenland crisis: In the Hands off Greenland protests, thousands of demonstrators attend rallies in Copenhagen, Odense, Aalborg, and Aarhus, Denmark, and Nuuk, Greenland, to protest the proposed takeover by U.S. president Donald Trump. The Nuuk protest is the largest in Greenland's history.
- 21 January – A disconnected undersea cable due to a technical issue causes a blackout that cuts electricity to Bornholm.

=== February ===
- 1 February – 2026 European Men's Handball Championship: The national handball team defeats Germany 40–30 to win the European Men's Handball Championship in Herning.
- 3 February – The Copenhagen City Court convicts two Swedish nationals for carrying out a grenade attack near the Israeli embassy in Copenhagen in 2024 and sentences them to up to 14 years' imprisonment.
- 18 February – King Frederik X arrives in Nuuk as part of a three-day visit to Greenland.

=== March ===
- 1 March – Danish shipping firm Maersk says that it is suspending all vessel transits through the Bab-el-Mandeb strait until further notice due to the ongoing conflict in the Persian Gulf.
- 2 March – Denmark and France make an agreement on strategic nuclear deterrence. However, French nuclear weapons are not to be located on Danish territory.
- 24 March – The 2026 Danish general election is held.

=== April ===
- 2 April – The Viking Ship Museum (Roskilde) announces the discovery of the wreckage of the warship Dannebroge, which was sunk by the Royal Navy during the Battle of Copenhagen in 1801.
- 21 April – Two passenger trains collide head-on between Hillerød and Kagerup, injuring 18 people.

=== June ===
- 27 June — 2026 European heatwaves: The highest recorded temperature in Denmark is taken in Ødum, measuring 37 °C (99 °F).

=== September ===
- 8 September – Denmark sanctions products from Israeli settlements in the West Bank. (Note: However, Denmark clarified that settlement trade restrictions are contingent on EU action.)
- 14 September – A Russian frigate fires emergency flares on a Royal Danish Air Force helicopter conducting routine patrols in the Baltic Sea, prompting the governmment to summon the Russian ambassador.
- 19 September – The United States and Denmark reach an agreement on security guarantees over Greenland.

=== October ===
- 23 October – The government announces a ban on mink farming effective August 2029.

=== November ===
- 4 November - In Copenhagen, students protested a government proposal to reduce student subsidies to free up funds for defense costs.
- 6 November – Following targeted airline hoaxes, police at Copenhagen Airport implement emergency security measures.

== Sports ==
=== Badminton ===
- 24 April – 3 May – The 2026 Thomas & Uber Cup is held in Horsens, Denmark.

=== Cycling ===
- 1 February – Tobias Lund Andresen wins 2026 Cadel Evans Great Ocean Road Race.
- 15 March – Jonas Vingegaard wins 2026 Paris–Nice
- 29 March – Jonas Vingegaard wins the 2026 Volta a Catalunya.

=== Handball ===
- 21 February – Denmark wins the 2026 European Men's Handball Championship.
- 13 March – Mathias Gidsel is announced as the winner of the IHF Male Player of the Year for the third time.

== Deaths ==
- 18 February – Sepp Piontek, football coach (born 1940 in Germany)
- 14 March – Birte Weiss, minister of the interior (1993–1997) (born 1941)
- 25 April – Jesper Thilo, jazz saxophonist (born 1941)
- 28 April –
  - Ittai Gradel, academic and antiques dealer (born 1965 in Israel)
  - Helge Mortensen, politician, minister of transport (1993–1994), member of the Folketing (1984–2005) (born 1941).
- 11 June – Niels Ersbøll, politician and diplomat, secretary-general of the Council of the European Union (1980–1994) (born 1926).
- 26 June – Kurt Ard, illustrator, painter and graphic artist (born 1925).
- 1 July – Hans Aarsleff, linguist and academic (born 1925). (death announced on this date)
