= 2025 in Denmark =

- Decades: 2000s; 2010s; 2020s
- See also: Other events of 2025; List of years in Denmark

Events in the year 2025 in Denmark.

== Incumbents ==
- Monarch: Frederik X
- Prime Minister – Mette Frederiksen
- Government: Frederiksen II Cabinet
- Folketing: 2022–2026 session (elected 1 November 2022)
- Leaders of the constituent countries
  - Prime Minister of the Faroe Islands – Aksel V. Johannesen
  - Prime Minister of Greenland – Múte Bourup Egede (until 7 April); Jens-Frederik Nielsen (since 7 April)

== Events ==
=== January ===
- 8 January–2 February – The 2025 World Men's Handball Championship in Croatia, Denmark and Norway.
- January– During a debate about Trump talk about taking over Greenland. Danish People's Party Anders Vistisen in the EU parliament gave a speech in which he said: "It is not for sale. Let me put it into words you might understand, Mr. Trump: fuck off." His speech later went viral on Social Media,

=== March ===
- 11 March – 2025 Greenlandic general election: The centre-right opposition Democrats win a plurality of votes in the Inatsisartut.

=== May ===
- 9–25 May – 2025 IIHF World Championship in Denmark and Sweden.
- 13 May – Kasso, the third facility in the world that produces e-methanol, opens near Aabenraa.

=== July ===
- 1 July
  - The 2025 Danish Presidency of the Council of the European Union begins.
  - The conscription of women into the Danish Defence through a lottery system comes into effect.
- 3 July – Denmark begins its rotating presidency of the European Union.

=== August ===
- 15 August – A passenger train derails after colliding with a slurry tanker at a level crossing near Tinglev, killing one person and injuring 27 others.
- 26 August – Denmark summons American chargé d'affaires Mark Stroh over allegations of US covert operations to promote separatism and annexation in Greenland.
- 27 August – The Danish and Greenlandic governments issue an official apology for historic abuses against Greenlandic women, including forced contraception.

=== September ===
- 2 September – The Supreme Court rules that Ahmed Samsam, a Danish national of Syrian origin who was convicted and imprisoned on charges of traveling to Syria to join Islamic State, was an informant for both the Danish Security and Intelligence Service and the Danish Defence Intelligence Service.
- 22 September – Unidentified drones are seen flying over Copenhagen Airport, resulting in major disruptions to aviation.
- 24 September – Unidentified drones are seen flying over Aalborg Airport, resulting in major disruptions to aviation.
- 26 September – Unidentified drones are seen flying over Air Base Karup, resulting in the closure of Midtjyllands Airport, which shares the same runway as the base.

=== October ===
- 2 October – 7th European Political Community Summit.

=== November ===
- 3 November – The HySynergy low-carbon hydrogen plant is inaugurated in Fredericia.
- 5 November – An Afghan national is arrested on suspicion of plotting to procure weapons for attacks against Jewish targets in Germany.
- 18 November – 2025 Danish local elections

=== December ===
- 10 December – The government announces an agreement to provide 300,000 kroner ($46,000) in individual compensation beginning in April 2026 to Greenlandic women who were given contraception against their knowledge or consent from 1960 to 1991.
- 18 December – The Danish Defence Intelligence Service formally accuses Russia of carrying out a series of cyberattacks that caused water outages in 2024 and other disruptions on the eve of the 2025 Danish local elections.
- 21 December – US president Donald Trump appoints Jeff Landry as his special envoy to Greenland, prompting the Danish government to summon the US ambassador the next day.
- 30 December – PostNord will stop delivering letters in Denmark.

== Culture ==
=== Film ===
- 1 February – The 42nd Robert Awards show takes place in Copenhagen.
- 19–30 March – The 23rd CPH:DOX 2025 documentary film festival takjes place.

== Sports ==
=== Badminton ===
- 19 January – Viktor Axelsen wins gold in men's single at India Open.
- 12–16 February – Denmark wins the 2025 European Mixed Team Badminton Championships.
- 2 March – Viktor Axelsen wins gold in men's single at German Open.
- 13 April – Line Kjærsfeldt wins gold in women's single and Jesper Toft and Amalie Magelund win golde in mixed double at the 2025 European Badminton Championships.
- 8 June – Anders Antonsen wins gold in men's single at Indonesia Open.
- 23 October – Anders Antonsen wins gold in men's single at the French Open.
- 2 November – Mia Blichfeldt wins gold in women's single at the 2025 Hylo Open.

=== Cycling ===
- 12–16 February – Denmark wins one gold medal, one silver medal and one bronze medal at the 2025 UEC European Track Championships.
- 16 February – Mads Pedersen wins the Tour de la Provence for the second year in a row.
- 23 February – Jonas Vingegaard wins the 2025 Volta ao Algarve.
- 30 March – Mads Pedersen wins Gent–Wevelgem for the second year in a row and the third time in his career.
- 20 April – Mattias Skjelmose wins the 2025 Amstel Gold Race.

=== Handball ===
- 2 February – Denmark wins gold in the 2025 World Men's Handball Championship.

=== Tennis ===
- 1 February – Denmark defeats Serbia in the first round of the 2025 Davis Cup.
- 20 April – Holger Rune wins the 2025 Barcelona Open Banc Sabadell by defeating Carlos Alcaraz 7–6, 6–2 in the final.

== Deaths ==
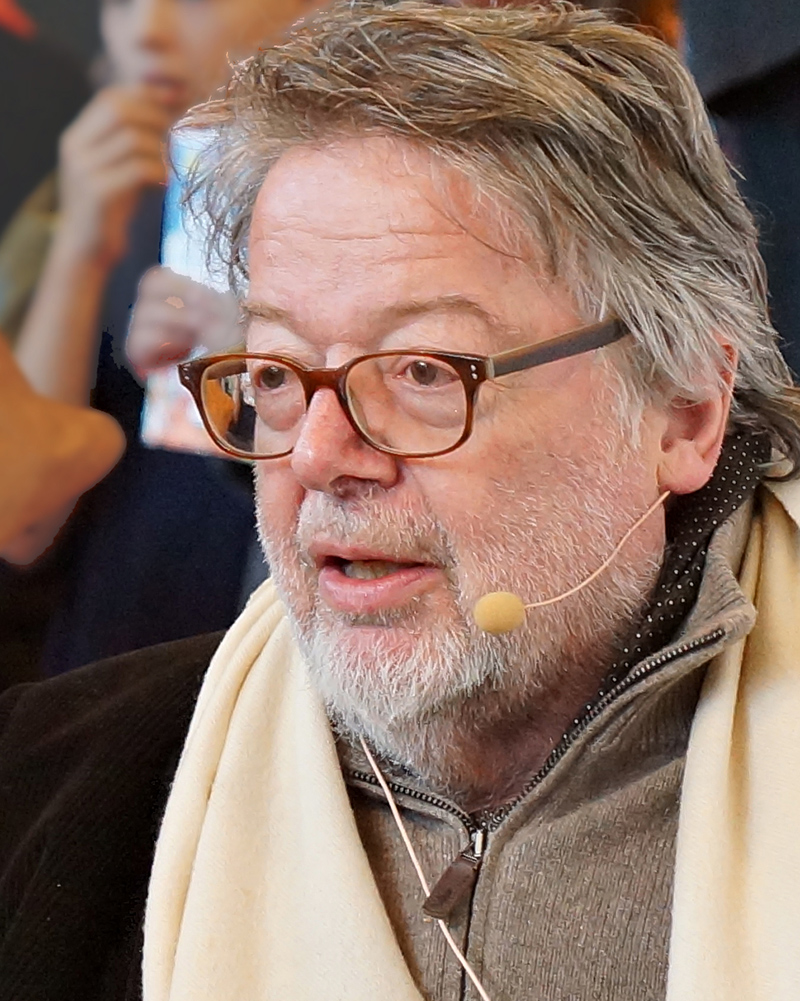
Peter Brandes.

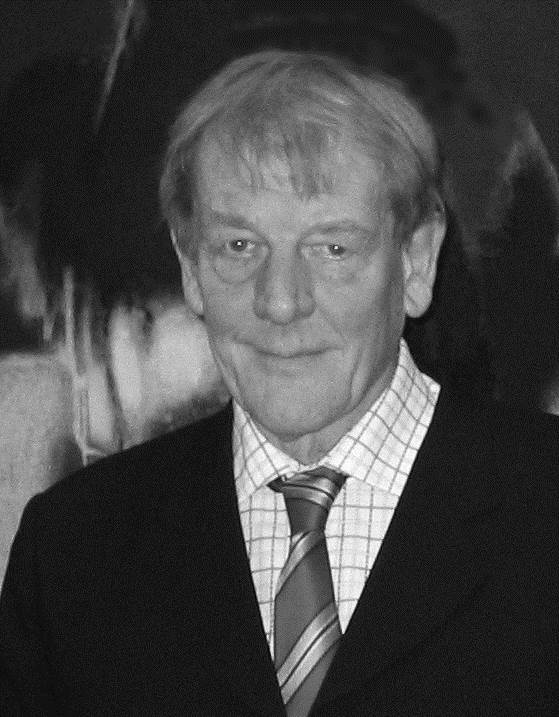
Per Nørgård.

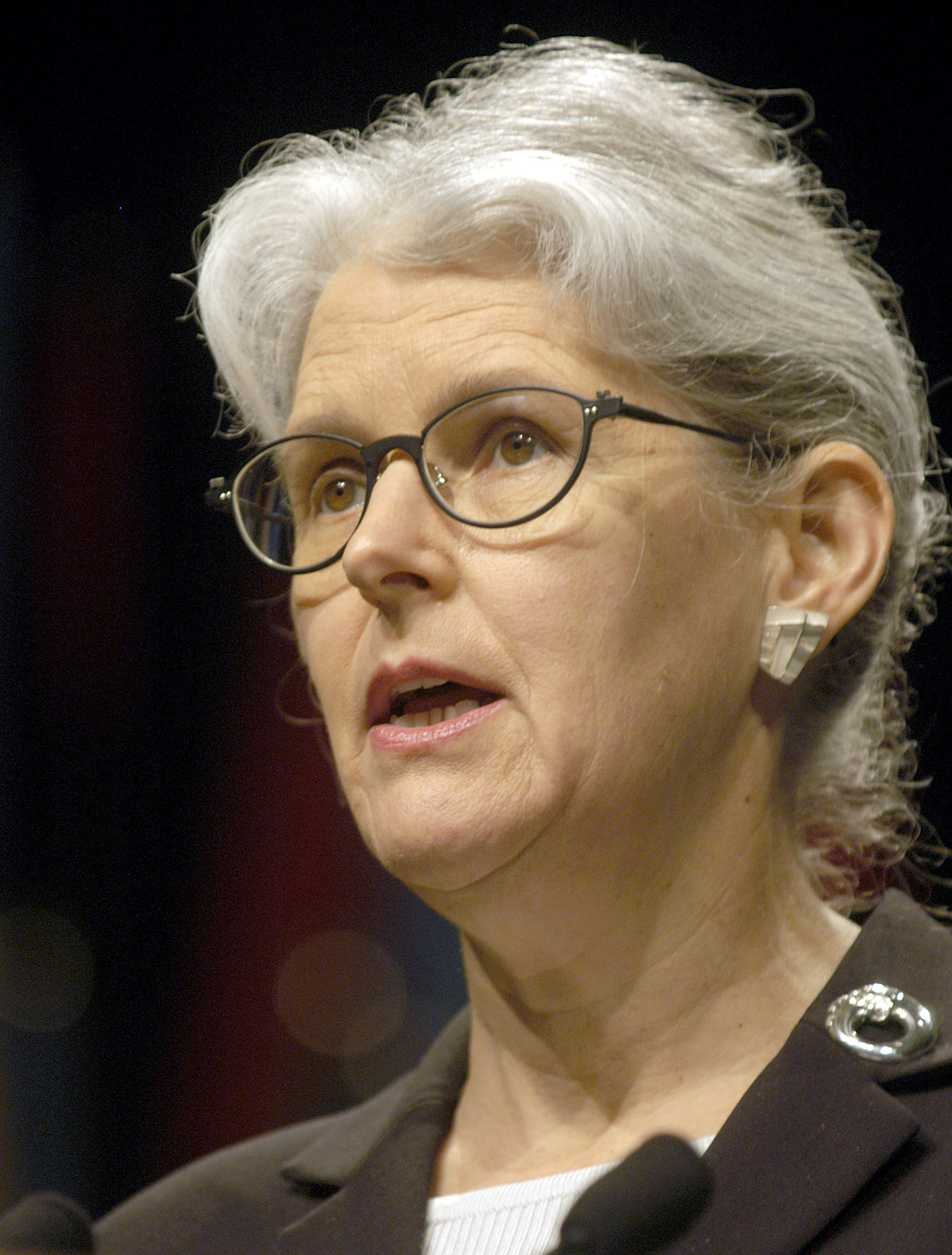
Bodil Nyboe Andersen.

=== January–March ===
- 2 January – Jytte Abildstrøm, actress (born 1934).
- 4 January – Peter Brandes, painter and sculptor (born 1944)
- 25 January – Ole Neumann, child actor known for playing Lille Per (da) in the Far til fire series (born 1947)
- 26 March – Kjeld Nørgaard (da), actor known for voicing Kaj on Kaj & Andrea (born 1938)

=== April–June ===
- 1 May – Ingolf Gabold, composer and television executive (born 1942)
- 28 May – Per Nørgård, composer (born 1932)
- 29 June – Ursula Munch-Petersen, ceramist (born 1937)

=== July–September ===
- 11 August – Peter Lund Madsen (da), neurologist, author, and entertainer (born 1960)
- 23 August – Per Holst, film director and producer (born 1939)
- 2 September – Morten Arnfred, filmmaker (born 1945)
- 6 September – Birthe Wesselhøft, artist (born 1934)
- 17 September – Hans Enoksen, Greenlandic politician, prime minister (2002–2009), member (since 1987) and speaker (2018) of the Inatsisartut (born 1956)
- 25 September – Karen Olsen Beck, Danish-born Costa Rican diplomat and politician, first lady of Costa Rica (1954–1958, 1970–1974) (born 1930).
- 29 September – Jørgen Leth, filmmaker, poet and sports commentator (born 1937)

=== October–December ===
- 24 October – Paul Hüttel, actor (born 1935)
- 10 November – Kaspar Rostrup, filmmaker (born 1940)
- 27 November – Bodil Nyboe Andersen, governor of the Bank of Denmark (born 1940)
