= 2023 in Denmark =

- Decades: 2000s; 2010s; 2020s
- See also: Other events of 2023; List of years in Denmark

Events in the year 2023 in Denmark.

== Incumbents ==
- Monarch – Margrethe II
- Prime Minister – Mette Frederiksen
- Government: Frederiksen II Cabinet
- Folketing: 2022–2026 session (elected 1 November 2022)
- Leaders of the constituent countries
  - Prime minister of the Faroe Islands – Aksel V. Johannesen
  - Prime Minister of Greenland – Múte Bourup Egede

== Events ==
=== January ===
- 1 January – Prince Joachim's four children, Nikolai, Felix, Henrik, and Athena, lose their titles of prince or princess, leaving count or countess of Monpezat as their most senior titles following a major public controversy in the royal family.
- 10 January – Leader of the Nye Borgerlige political party Pernille Vermund announces her intention to resign, being succeeded by Lars Boje Mathiesen, on 7 February.
- 31 January – Coop Danmark announces that the Irma chain will close with effect from 1 April after 137 years in operation.

=== February ===
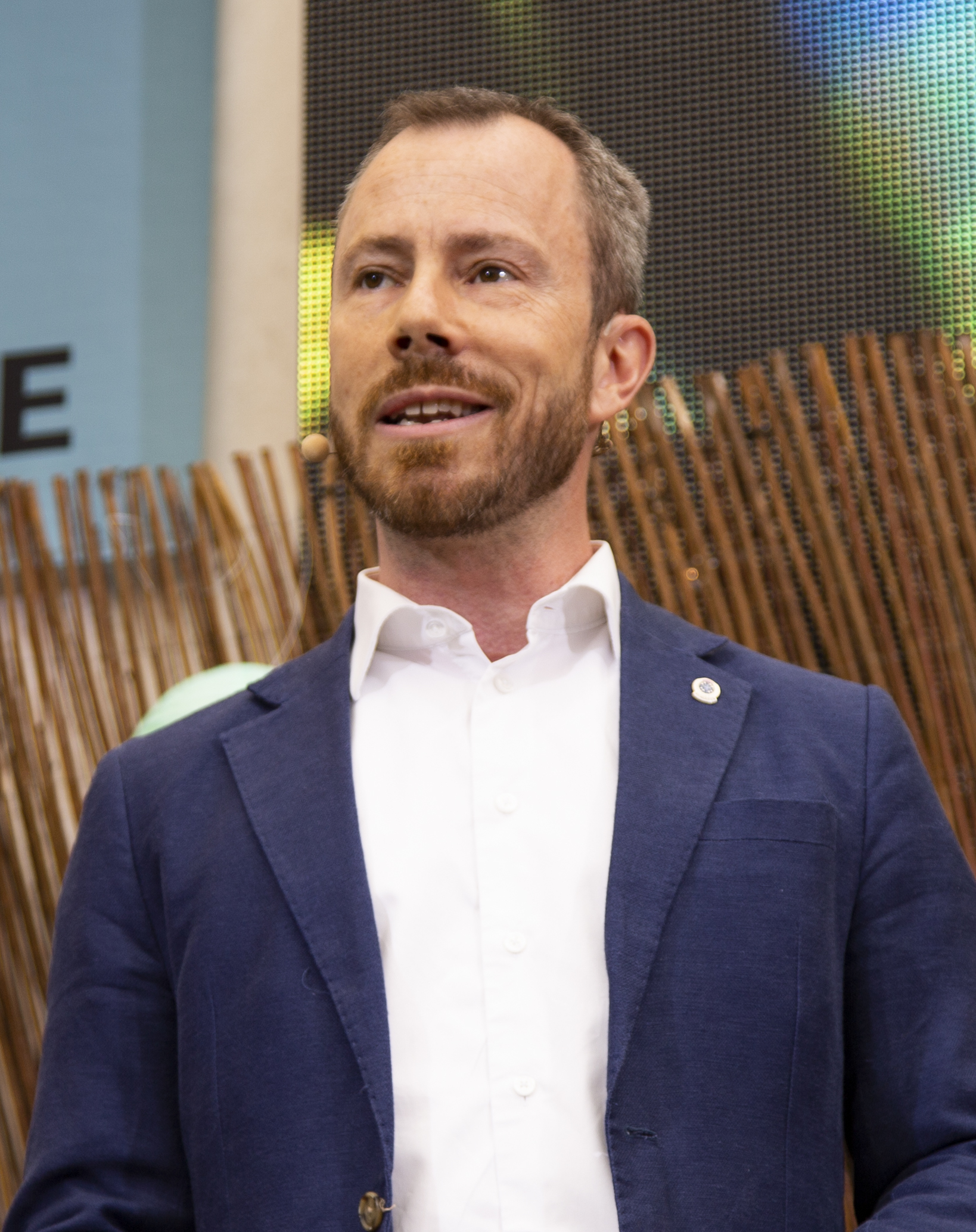
Deputy prime minister and defense minister Jakob Ellemann-Jensen goes on sick leave in February 2023, returning in August.

- 6 February – Minister of Defence and Deputy Prime Minister Jakob Ellemann-Jensen goes on sick leave indefinitely with incumbent Minister for Economic Affairs Troels Lund Poulsen being appointed acting Minister of Defence.
- 11 February – The 53rd edition of Dansk Melodi Grand Prix 2023 is held in Arena Næstved in Næstved with Faroese singer Reiley being selected as Denmark's entry for the Eurovision Song Contest
- 17 February – A major storm named Otto (da) hits most of Denmark causing several incidents of property damage.
- 28 February – After fierce debate, the Folketing votes to abolish the Danish holiday Store Bededag (Great Prayer Day) with effect from 2024.

=== March ===
- 6 March – Denmark's Ministry of Defence bans TikTok on work devices.
- 9 March – Venstre deputy leader Stephanie Lose is appointed minister without portfolio for the purpose of serving as acting Minister for Economic Affairs to relieve Troels Lund Poulsen.
- 10 March – Nye Borgerlige announces that party leader Lars Boje Mathiesen, the day prior, has been dismissed as leader and expelled from the party due to disputes over remuneration and campaign finances.

=== April ===
- 15 April – A 13-year-old girl named Filippa disappears from the village Kirkerup. On the 16th, the girl is found alive in the house of a 32-year-old man in Svenstrup, Korsør. On the 18th, the man is charged on several counts, including rape. On the 24th, the man is also charged for the 2016 unsolved murder of Emilie Meng.
- 24 April – A delayed government budget (Finansloven) for 2023 is agreed upon between the Danish government, the Green Left, the Liberal Alliance, the Social Liberal Party, and the Danish People's Party.
- 30 April – Leader of the Trade Union Confederation Lizette Risgaard resigns, following allegations of sexual harassment.

=== May ===
- 1 May – International Workers' Day is held in the light of Risgaard's resignation and the Trade Union Confederation's refusal to invite Social Democrats due to their in abolishing Store Bededag.
- 3 May – A new national warning system is tested by the Emergency Management Agency and the police with civil defense sirens sounding nationwide.
- 5 May – Great Prayer Day (Store Bededag) is held for the last time, after 337 years as an official holiday.
- 12 May – During a debate in the Folketing about Rigsfællesskabet, Greenlandic MP Aki-Matilda Høegh-Dam (Siumut) speaks in Greenlandic, refusing to switch to Danish when other MPs ask her questions in that language. This sets off a public debate about which working languages to use in parliament. Speaker Søren Gade (V) says that Høegh-Dam had notified the Presidium of the Folketing an hour in advance, when she sent them an email transcript of the speech, along with a Danish translation. According to the Folketing's website, there is no rule against an MP speaking Greenlandic or Faroese, but it is customary for the MP to translate their statement into Danish afterwards.
- 15 May – Forewarned truck blockades of roads against the introduction of a new truck duty (afgift) causes major traffic havoc nationwide.

=== June ===
- 15–17 June – Folkemødet (da), an annual political festival, takes place on Bornholm.

=== August ===
- 20–21 August – Ukrainian president Volodymyr Zelenskyy visits Denmark in connection with its donation of 19 F-16s to Ukraine.
- 23 August – Jakob Ellemann-Jensen switches ministry with Troels Lund Poulsen, going from Minister of Defence to Minister for Economic Affairs.
- 26 August – Astronaut Andreas Mogensen begins his second mission to the International Space Station, arriving the following day. As pilot of SpaceX Crew-7, he becomes the first non-American to pilot a SpaceX Dragon 2 or any other SpaceX vehicle. Mogensen's personal mission is the Huginn mission, where he will conduct over 30 European experiments on "climate, health, and space for Earth" for the European Space Agency. Joined by three other astronauts, he is taking part in Expedition 69 and 70, and they are expected to return to Earth in February 2024.

=== September ===
- 6 September – Danish Prime Minister Mette Frederiksen speaks before the Ukrainian parliament in Kyiv.

=== October ===
- Jakob Ellemann-Jensen announces his resignation as leader of Venstre and his departure from Danish politics.

=== November ===
- 6–8 November – Felipe VI, King of Spain, goes on a state visit to Denmark
- 18 November – Troels Lund Poulsen is elected new leader of Venstre.

=== December ===
- 6 December – Sanjay Shah is extradited to Denmark from the United Arab Emirates.
- 7 December –
  - Mia Wagner resigns as minister of digitalisation and gender equality only two weeks after being appointed.
  - The Danish Parliament votes to criminalize the desecration of religious texts after a series of quran burning incidents by far-right activists.
- 14 December – Three people are arrested in Denmark and one in the Netherlands on charges of conspiring to commit terrorism, with four individuals being charged in absentia.
- 21 December – Denmark (Lars Løkke Rasmussen) and the United States (Antony Blinken) sign a defence agreement that will allow U.S. soldiers and military equipment to be based on Danish soil.
- 31 December – Queen Margrethe announces her abdication on live television in her annual New Year's Speech, with effect from 14 January 2024.

== Culture ==
=== Film ===
- 9 December – Mads Mikkelsen wins the European Film Award for Best Actor at the 36th European Film Awards for his role in The Promised Land.

== Sports ==
=== Badminton ===
- 15 January – Viktor Axelsen wins gold in Men's single at 2023 Malaysia Open.
- 18 February – Denmark wins the 2023 European Mixed Team Badminton Championships by defeating France 3–2 in the final.
- 2 April – Mathias Christiansen and Alexandra Bøje win gold in Mixed Double at 2023 Spain Masters.
- 18 June – Viktor Axelsen wins gold in Men's Single at 2023 Indonesia Open.
- 23 July – Anders Antonsen wins gold in Men's Single at 2023 Korea Open.
- 21–27 August – The 2023 BWF World Championships takes place in Copenhagen.
- 17 September – Kim Astrup and Anders Skaarup Rasmussen win gold in Men's Double at Hong Kong Open.
- 19 November – Viktor Axelsen wins gold in Men's Single at 2023 Japan Masters.
- 17 December – Viktor Axelsen wins gold in Men's Single at the 2023 BWF World Tour Finals for the third year in a row (fifth time in total).

=== Canoe and karak ===
- 21– Denmark wins two gold medals, one silver medal and one bronze medal in Canoe sprint at the 2023 European Games.
- 23–28 August Denmark wins two gold medals at one silver medal at the 2023 ICF Canoe Sprint World Championships.
- 31 August – October – Denmark wins a gold medal and two silver medals at the 2023 ICF Canoe Marathon World Championships,

=== Cycling ===
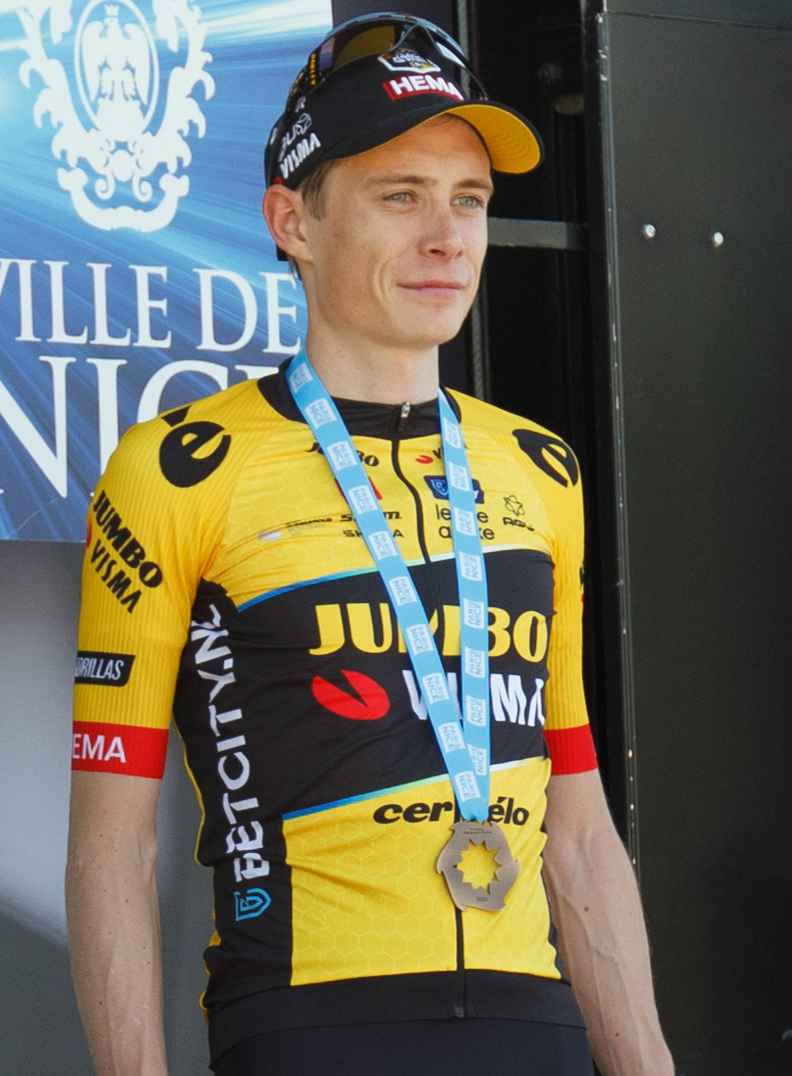
Vingegaard at the 2023 Paris–Nice

- 26 February – Jonas Vingegaard wins the 2023 O Gran Camiño.
- 8 April – Jonas Vingegaard wins the 2023 Tour of the Basque Country.
- 1 May – Søren Krag Andersen wins Eschborn–Frankfurt.
- 11 May – Mads Pedersen wins Stage 6 of the 2023 Giro d'Italia.
- 16 May – Magnus Cort wins Stage 10 of 2023 Giro d'Italia.
- 11 June – Jonas Vingegaard wins the 2023 Critérium du Dauphiné.
- 17 June – Mattias Skjelmose wins the 2023 Tour de Suisse.
- 4 July – Jonas Vingegaard takes over the yellow jersey after Stage 4 of the 2023 Tour de France.
- 8 July – Mads Pedersen wins Stage 8 of the 2023 Tour de France.
- 18 July – Jonas Vingegaard wins Stage 16 of the 2023 Tour de France.
- 20 July – Kasper Asgreen wins Stage 18 of the 2023 Tour de France.
- 23 July – Jonas Vingegaard wins the 2023 Tour de France.
- 28 July – Emma Norsgaard wins Stage 6 of the 2023 Tour de France Femmes.
- 3–9 August – Denmark wins a gold medal in Men's team pursuit and Amalie Dideriksen wins a silver medal in Women's omnium at the 2023 UCI Track Cycling World Championships.
- 30 September – Cecilie Uttrup Ludwig wins Giro dell'Emilia Internazionale Donne Elite.

=== Football ===
- 16–23 February – FC Midtjylland is defeated 5–1 on aggregate by Sporting CP in the knockout phase of the 2022–23 UEFA Europa League.
- 17 February – The 2022–23 Danish Superliga returns after an unusually long winter break.
- 18 May – F.C. Copenhagen wins the 2022–23 Danish Cup by defeating AAB 1– in the final.
- 29 May – F.C. Copenhagen secures the Danish football championship by defeating Viborg FF 2–1 in the second last round of the 2022–23 Danish Superliga while FC Nordsjælland loses 5–1 to Brøndby IF.
- 12 December – F.C. Copenhagen finishes second in Group A of the 2023–24 UEFA Champions League after defeating Galatasaray S.K. 1–0 in the last group match and is therefore ready for the knock-out phase.

=== Golf ===
- 18 February – Thorbjørn Olesen wins Thailand Classic in the 2023 European Tour.
- 9 July – Tasmus Højgaard wins Made in Denmark onm the 2023 European Tour.
- 19 November – Nicolai Højgaard wins the 2023 European Tour.
- 19 November – Nicolai Højgaard wins the DP World Tour Championship on the 2023 European Tour.

=== Handball ===
- 29 January – Denmark wins the 2023 World Men's Handball Championship for the third time in a row by defeating France 34–29 in the final.
- 18 February – GOG wins the Danish Men's Handball Cup for the second year in a row by defeating Skjern 34 – 29 in the final.
- 3 June – Team Esbjerg loses 29–30 to Ferencvárosi TC in the semifinal of the 2022–23 Women's EHF Champions League.
- 10 June – GOG Håndbold wins the 2023 Danish Men's Handball League.

=== Motorsports ===
- 28 May — Frederik Vesti wins the 2022 Monte Carlo Formula 2 round.
- 2 July – Bastian Buus wins the 2023 Porsche Supercup race at the Red Bull Ring.
- 16 July – Christian Lundgaard wins the 2023 Honda Indy Toronto race.
- 3 September – Bastian Buus wins the 2023 Porsche Supercup as part of the Lechner Racing team.

=== Tennis ===
- 18 February – Clara Tauson wins AK Ladies Open in Altenkirchen by defeating Greet Minnen with 7-6 (7–5), 4–6, 6–2 in the final.
- 23 April – Holger Rune wins 2023 BMW Open by defeating Botic van de Zandschulp 6–3, 1–6, 7–6(7–3) in the final.
- 21 August – Holger Rune reaches No. 4 on the world ranking, the highest ranking of a Danish tennis player to date.

=== Other ===
- 20 August – Anne-Marie Rindom wins a bronze medal in Laser Radial at the 2023 Sailing World Championships.
- 4–10 September – Denmark wins two gold medals, one silver medal and one bronze medal at the 2023 FEI European Dressage Championships.

== Deaths ==
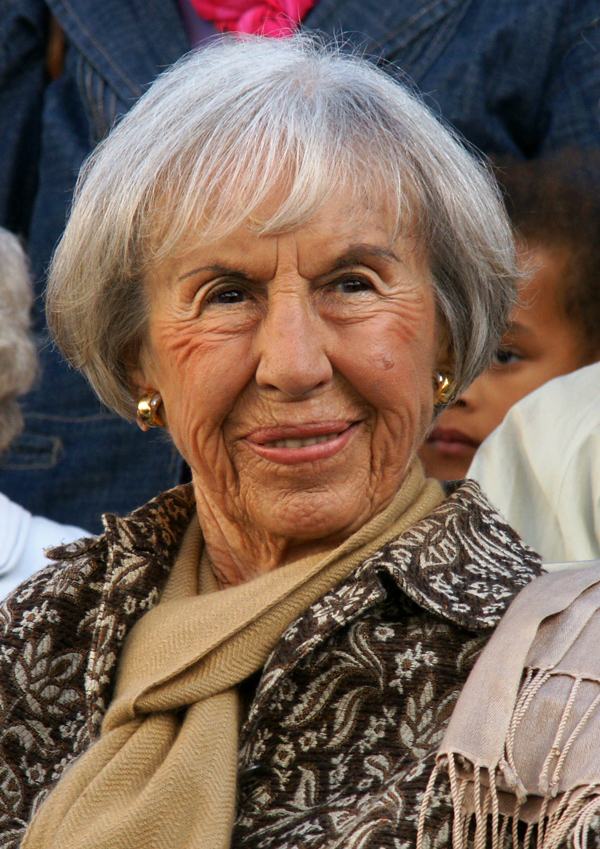
Lise Nørgaard

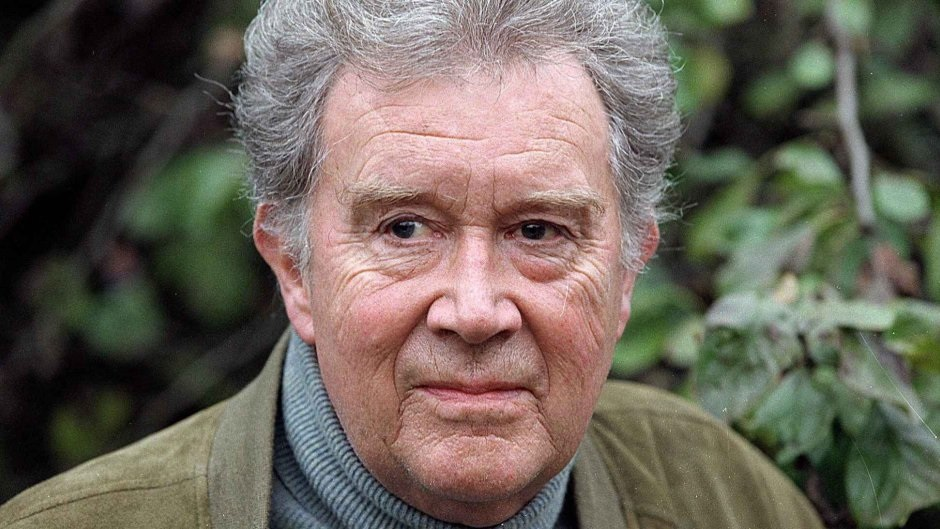
Jørgen Reenberg.

=== January–March ===
- 1 January – Lise Nørgaard, writer, journalist, and creator of Matador (born 1917)
- 21 January –
  - Ritt Bjerregaard, former politician, minister of education, and lord mayor of Copenhagen (born 1941)
  - Susi Hyldgaard, jazz singer (born 1963)
- 31 January – Henrik Nordbrandt, poet (born 1945)
- 3 February – Michael Juul Sørensen (da), radio host (born 1949)
- 6 February
  - Inge Krogh, politician (born 1920)
  - Greta Andersen, swimmer (born 1927)
- 18 February – Britt Bendixen, dance instructor and TV personality (born 1942)
- 24 February – Lars-Viggo Jensen (de), racing driver (born 1945)
- 28 February – Jens Kristian Hansen (da), former politician and minister for public works (born 1926)
- 8 March – Josua Madsen, drummer in the band Artillery (born 1978)
- 11 March – Erik Rud Brandt, fashion designer and businessman (died 1943)

=== April–June ===
- 1 April – Dario Campeotto, singer and entertainer (born 1939)
- 2 April – Hans Edvard Nørregård-Nielsen, art historian (born 1945)
- 9 April – Bodil Sangill (da), actress (born 1932)
- 29 April – Holger Perfort (da), actor (born 1925)
- 16 May – Per Røntved, professional footballer (born 1949)
- 5 June – Mads Lundby Hansen, economist and advocate of liberalism (born 1969)
- 12 June – Mette Gjerskov, politician and sitting member of the Folketing (born 1966)

=== July–September ===
- 9 July – Asbjørn Sennels, footballer (born 1979)
- 27 August – Eddie Skoller, entertainer (born 1944)

=== October–December ===
- 8 November – Søren Krarup, pastor, author and member of the Folketing (born 1937)
- 9 November – Jørgen Reenberg, actor (born 1927)
- 1 December – Jørn Mader (da), sports journalist (born 1947)
- 22 December – Tom Bogs, boxer (died 1944)
