= 1940 in Denmark =

- Decades: 1920s; 1930s; 1940s; 1950s; 1960s
- See also: Other events of 1940; List of years in Denmark

Events from the year 1940 in Denmark.

== Incumbents ==
- Monarch – Christian X
- Prime minister – Thorvald Stauning

== Events ==
- 9 April – Operation Weserübung takes place, beginning the occupation of Denmark by Nazi Germany.
- 16 April – Princess Margrethe, the future Queen Margrethe II, is born to Crown Prince Frederik and Crown Princess Ingrid of Sweden.
- 8 September – Grundtvig's Church is inaugurated in Copenhagen.

== Sports ==
=== Badminton ===
- 7 November – Lillerød Badminton Club is founded in Lillerød

=== Football ===
- Kjøbenhavns Boldklub wins their eighth Danish football championship by winning the 1939–40 Danish Championship League.

== Births ==
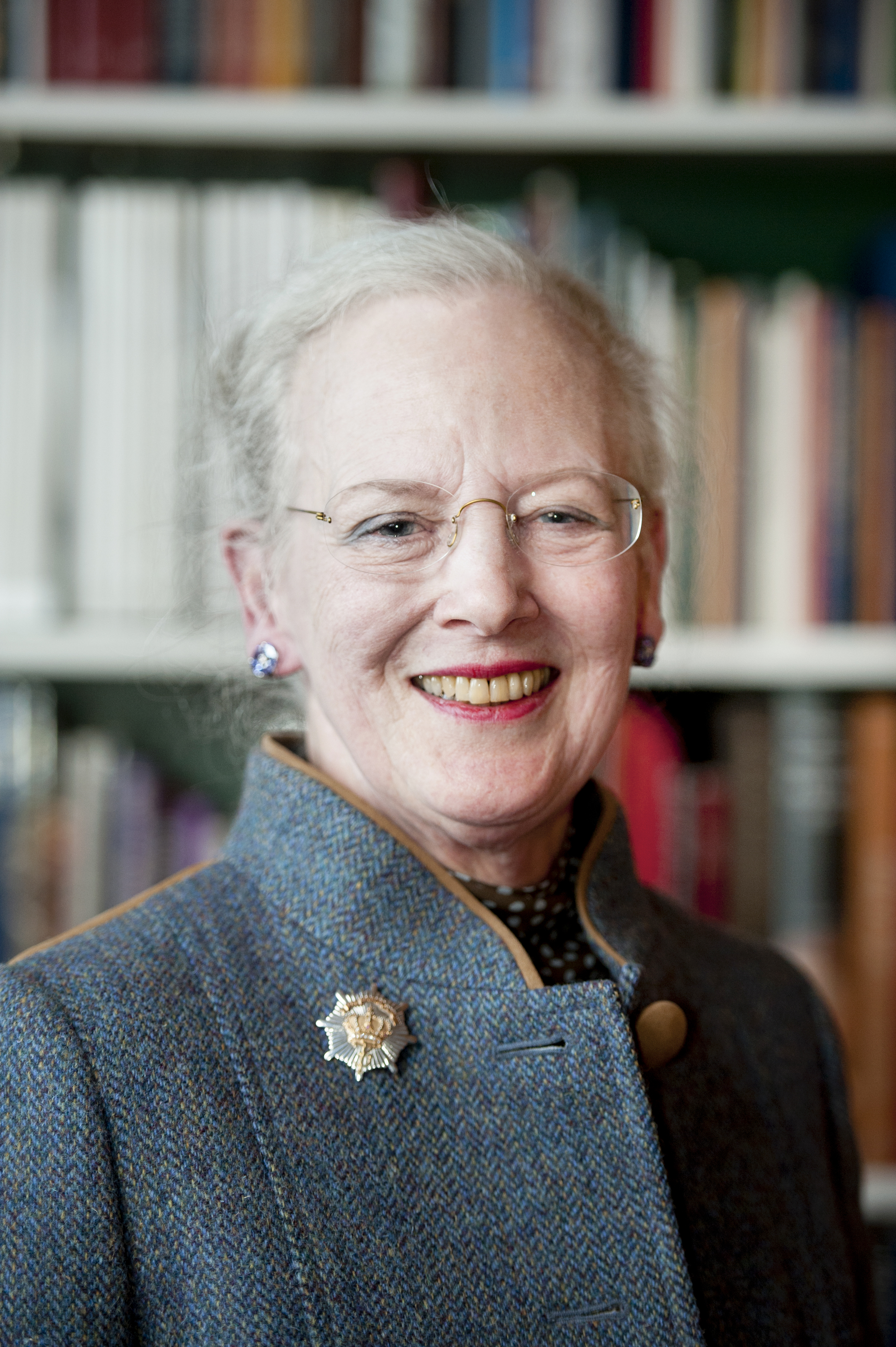
Margrethe II of Denmark.

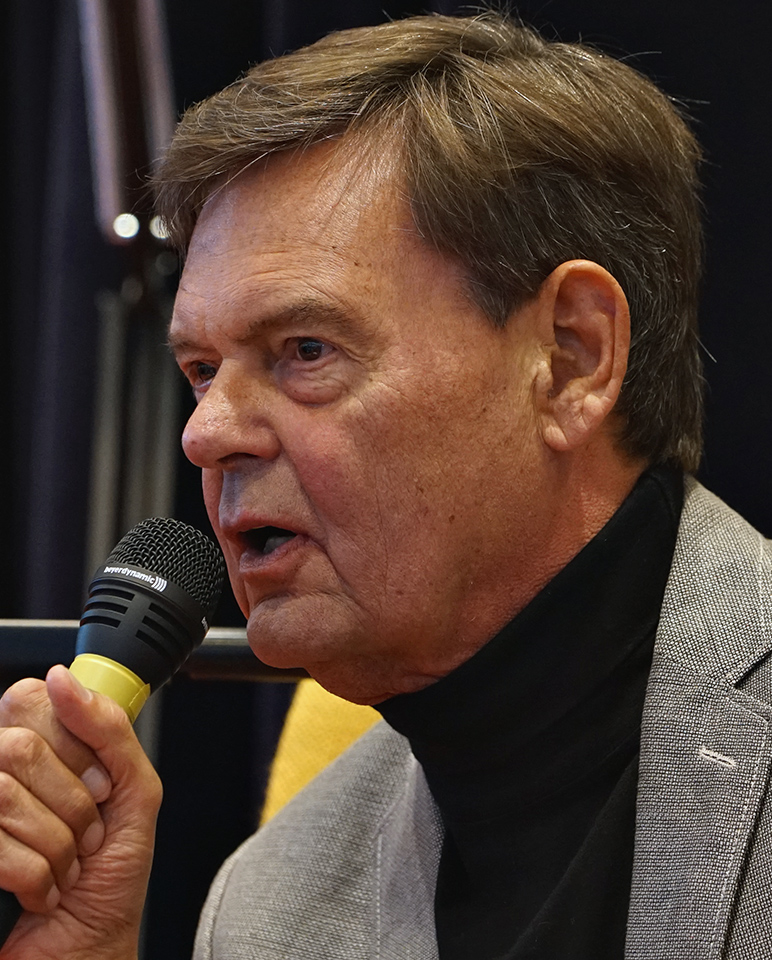
Ulf Pilgaard.

=== January–March ===
- 12 January – Helle-Vibeke Erichsen, artist and illustrator (died 2016)
- 14 February – Eva Sørensen, sculptor and ceramist (died 2019)
- 25 February – Thue Christiansen, Greenlandic politician (died 2022)
- 29 March – Allan Botschinsky, jazz trumpeter (died 2020)

=== April–June ===
- 16 April – Princess Margrethe, the future Queen Margrethe II
- 21 April – Erik Hagens, painter and illustrator
- 27 April – Kaspar Rostrup, filmmaker (died 2025)

=== October–December ===
- 9 October – Bodil Nyboe Andersen, governor of the Bank of Denmark (died 2025)
- 24 October – Jørgen Boberg, painter and illustrator (died 2009)
- 15 November – Ulf Pilgaard, actor (died 2024)
- 3 December – Palle Jacobsen, ballet dancer (died 2009)

== Deaths ==
=== January–March ===
- 28 January – Heinrich Dohm, painter of portraits, genre works and religious paintings (born 1875)
- 17 February – Julius Paulsen, painter (born 1860)
- 13 March – Gustav Frederik Holm, Arctic explorer, naval officer (born 1849)
- 28 March – Henrik Grønvold, painter (born 1858)
- 25 May – Marie Krøyer, painter (born 1867)

=== July–September ===
- 27 July – Gerda Wegener, painter (born 1886)
- 10 September – Gerda Madvig, painter and sculptor (born 1868)
- 28 July – Gerda Wegener, illustrator and painter (died 1885)

=== October–December ===
- 10 December – Christian Schrøder, film actor (born 1869)
- 19 December – Charlotte Norrie, nurse and women's rights activist (born 1855)
