= 1966 in Denmark =

- Decades: 1940s; 1950s; 1960s; 1970s; 1980s
- See also: Other events of 1966; List of years in Denmark

Events from the year 1966 in Denmark.

== Incumbents ==
- Monarch – Frederik IX
- Prime minister – Jens Otto Krag

== Births ==
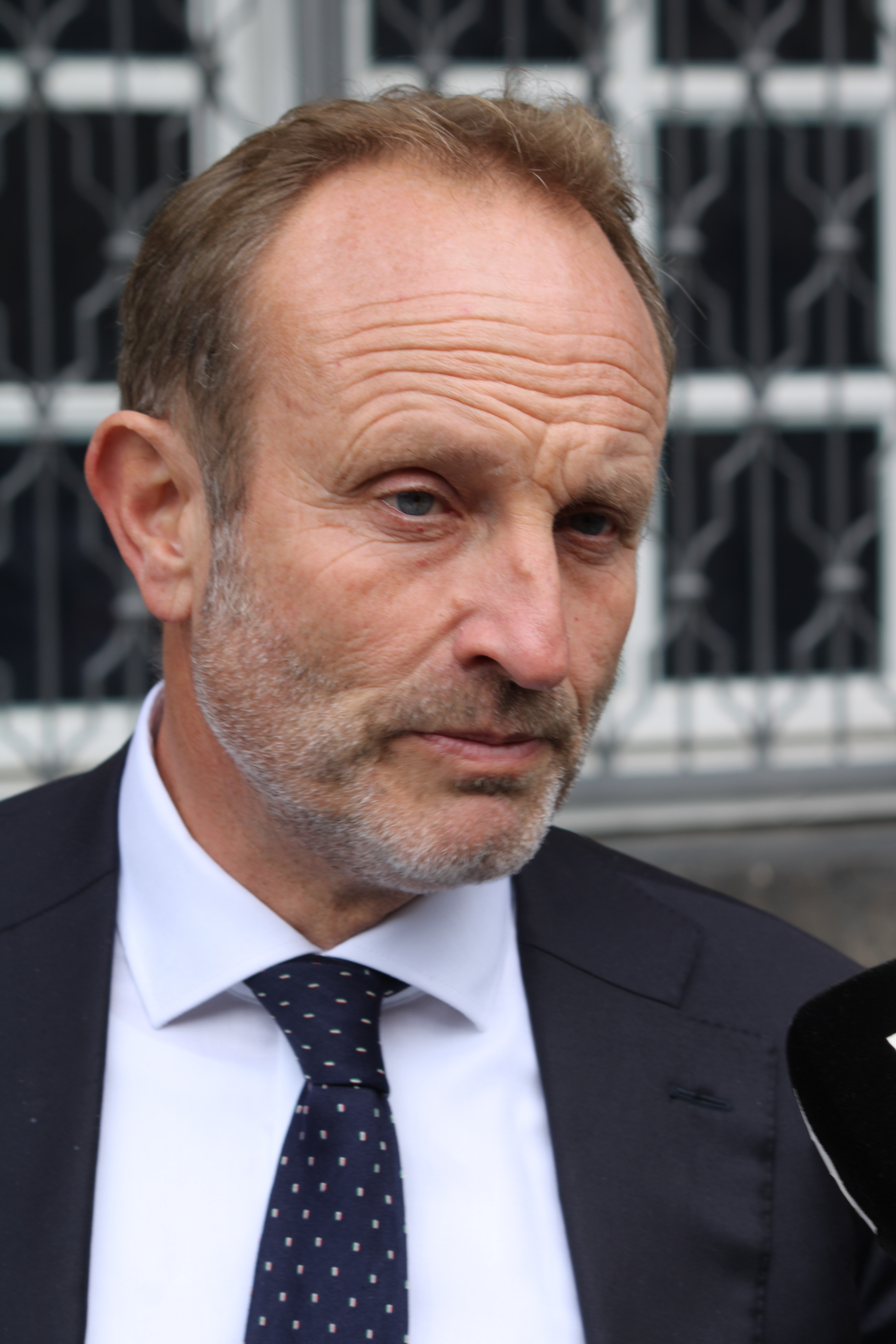
Martin Lidegaard.

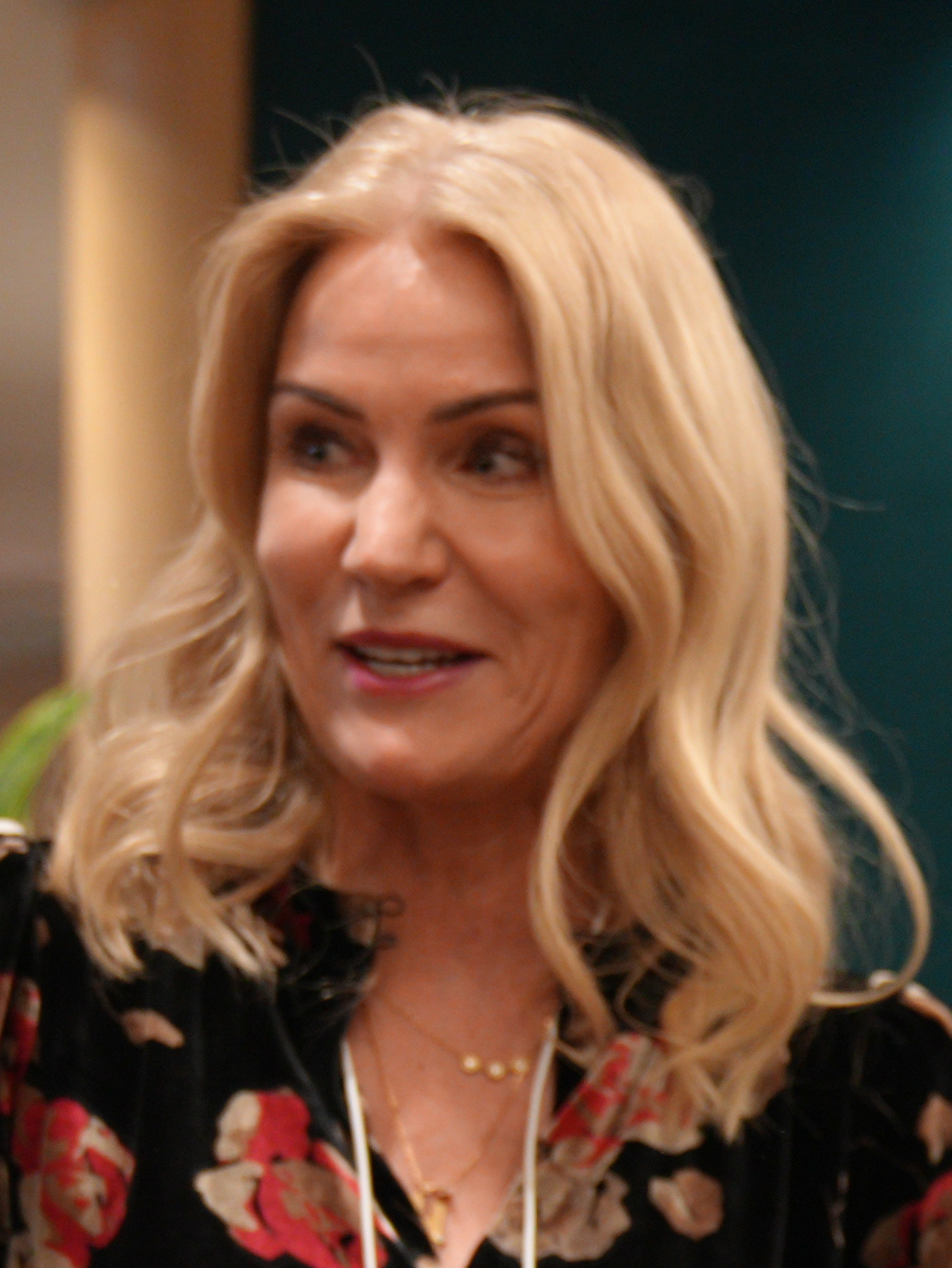
Helle Thorning-Schmidt.

=== January–March ===
- 25 January – Heinz Ehlers, ice hockey coach and former ice hockey player
- 31 January – Lone Dencker Wisborg, diplomat, lawyer and civil servant
- 31 March – Linse Kessler, television personality

=== April–June ===
- 7 May – Jes Høgh, footballer
- 18 May – Peter Juel-Jensen, politician

=== July–September ===
- 28 July – Mette Gjerskov, politician (died 2023)
- 18 August – Christian Karsten Hansen, biotech entrepreneur
- 22 September – Lone Frank, journalist

=== October–December ===
- 13 October – Henrik Valeur, architect
- 15 October – Troels Lyby, actor
- 3 December – Flemming Povlsen, football player
- 12 December – Martin Lidegaard, politician
- 14 December – Helle Thorning-Schmidt, politician, leader of Socialdemokraterne

== Deaths ==
- 26 February – Karl Jørgensen, actor (b. 1890)
- 18 March – Osvald Helmuth, actor and singer (b. 1894)
- 24 April – Hans Christian Branner, writer (b. 1903)
- 14 May – Oluf Høst, painter (b. 1883)
- 3 July – Eleanor Margaret Green, Princess Viggo, Countess of Rosenborg (born 1895 in USA)
- 13 August – Poul Hansen, politician (born 1913)
- 22 August – Gunnar Aaby, footballer (born 1895)

== See also ==
- 1966 in Danish television
