= 1969 in Denmark =

- Decades: 1940s; 1950s; 1960s; 1970s; 1980s
- See also: Other events of 1969; List of years in Denmark

Events from the year 1969 in Denmark.

== Incumbents ==
- Monarch – Frederik IX
- Prime minister – Hilmar Baunsgaard

== Events ==
- 20 February – The North Sea Continental Shelf cases are decided at the International Court of Justice.
- 10 March – The Danish Technical Museum is inaugurated in Helsingør.
- 8 May – The Museum of Medical History is inaugurated in Bredgade in Copenhagen.
- 28 May – The LO School is inaugurated by the Danish labour movement in Helsingør.
- 15 June – The 750 years' anniversary of the Danish flag, Dannebrog, is celebrated throughout Denmark. 750 flags from all parts of Denmark are gathered on City Hall Square in Copenhagen.
- 24 June – The proposed lowering of the electoral age from 21 to 18 is rejected by 78.6% of voters at the 1969 Danish electoral age referendum.
- 1 July – Denmark legalizes visual pornography.
- 30 September – The government sets up a temporary Environmental Committee.
- 15 November – An estimated 20,000 people attend an anti-Vietnam War demonstration in Copenhagen, marching from Østerbro Barracks to Christiansborg by way of the American Embassy.

=== Full date missing ===
- The Danish Liberal Centre Party is dissolved.

== Sport ==
=== Cycling ===
- 22-24 August – Leif Mortensen wins gold in Men's amateur road race and Denmark wins silver in Men's team time trial at the 1969 UCI Road World Championships.

=== Football ===
- Boldklubben 1903 wins the 1969 Danish 1st Division in football.

== Music ==
- First performance in Denmark of Rued Langgaard's Music of the Spheres, 51 years after it was composed.

== Births ==
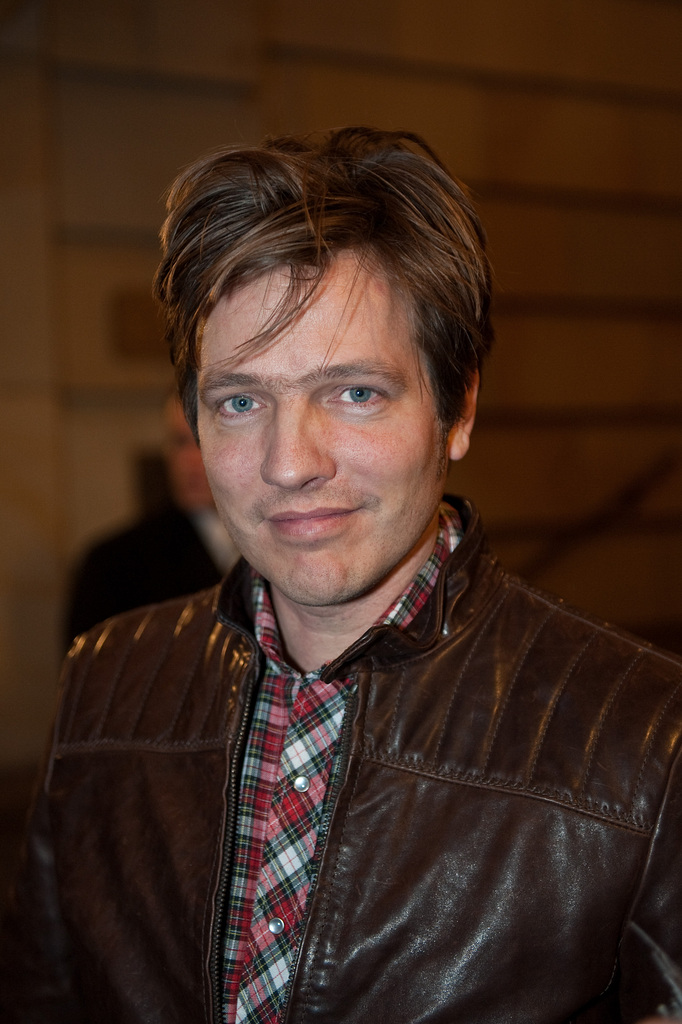
Thomas Vinterberg.

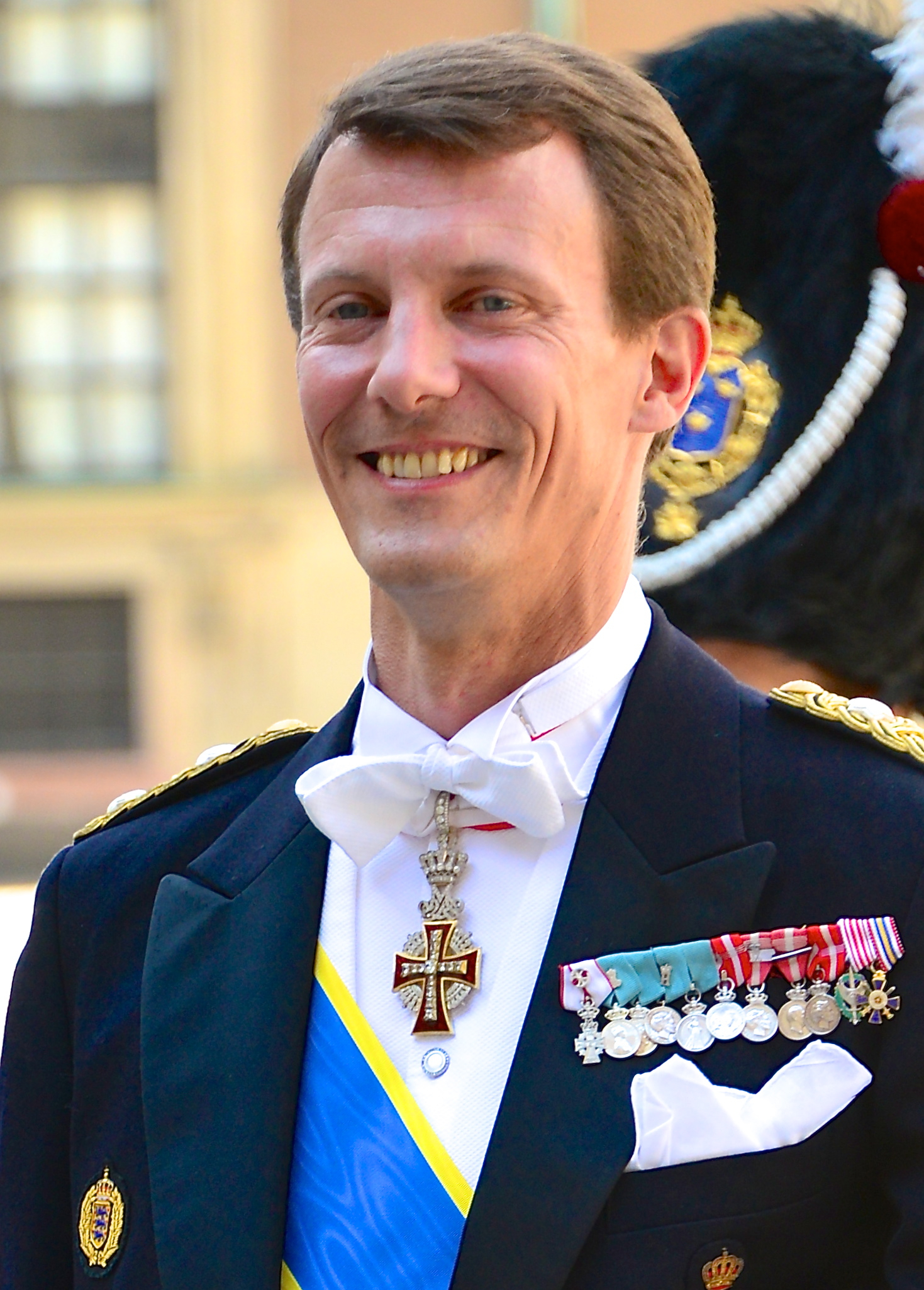
Prince Joachim of Denmark

=== January–March ===
- 7 February – Chris Minh Doky, jazz bassist, composer, producer
- 15 February – Anja Andersen, handball player
- 20 February – Thomas Warming, illustrator, painter, and author
- 19 May – Thomas Vinterberg, film director

=== April–June ===
- 9 April – Morten Klessen, politician
- 7 June – Prince Joachim, second son of Princess Margrethe

=== July–September ===
- 21 September – Mads Lundby Hansen, economist (died 2023)
- 28 September – Anders W. Berthelsen, actor

=== October–December ===
- 27 October – Lykke Friis and former politician

== Deaths ==
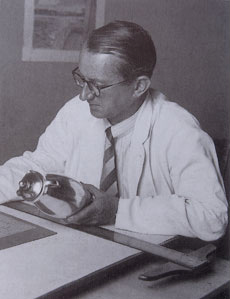
Gundorph Albertus.

=== January–June ===
- 2 January – Julius Bomholt, politician (born 1896)
- 12 February – Victor Gram, politician (born 1910)
- 27 March – Ingeborg Suhr Mailand, educator (born 1871)
- 29 June – Poul Sørensen, politician (born 1904)

=== October–December ===
- 9 November – Paul Berth, football player (born 1890)
- 15 November – Johannes Juul, engineer (born 1887)
- 15 November – Niels Larsen, sport shooter (born 1889)
- 16 December – Leo Mathisen, jazz pianist, singer (born 1906)
- 26 December – Gundorph Albertus, silversmith (born 1887)

== See also ==
- 1969 in Danish television
