= Hyldgaard =

Hyldgaard is a Danish surname. Notable people with the surname include:

- Morten Hyldgaard (born 1978), Danish footballer
- Søren Hyldgaard (1962–2018), Danish composer
- Susi Hyldgaard (1963–2023), Danish jazz musician
