= 2024 in Denmark =

- Decades: 2000s; 2010s; 2020s
- See also: Other events of 2024; List of years in Denmark

Events in the year 2024 in Denmark.

== Incumbents ==
- Monarch: Margrethe II (until 14 January), Frederik X
- Prime Minister – Mette Frederiksen
- Government: Frederiksen II Cabinet
- Folketing: 2022–2026 session (elected 1 November 2022)
- Leaders of the constituent countries
  - Prime minister of the Faroe Islands – Aksel V. Johannesen
  - Prime Minister of Greenland – Múte Bourup Egede

== Events ==
=== January ===
- 10 January – Pernille Vermund announces that she will recommend that New Right be dissolved on the party's next general assembly after five years in parliament.
- 14 January – Queen Margrethe II signs paperwork at a Council of State meeting, formalizing her abdication after 52 years on the throne. She is succeeded by her son, Frederik X, who is proclaimed king by prime minister Mette Frederiksen on the balcony of Christiansborg Castle.

=== February ===
- 18 February – Prime Minister of Denmark Mette Frederiksen announces that the country will donate all of its artillery shells to Ukraine.

=== March ===
- 2 March – Søren Pape Poulsen, leader of the Conservative People's Party, has a cerebral hemorrhage at a party conference in Vejen and is taken to Odense University Hospital, where he dies aged 52. Deputy leader Michael Ziegler (da) becomes temporary leader of the Conservatives until a new leader can be elected.
- 14 March – Denmark announces plans to extend military conscription to women for the first time and to also increase the standard service time.

=== April ===
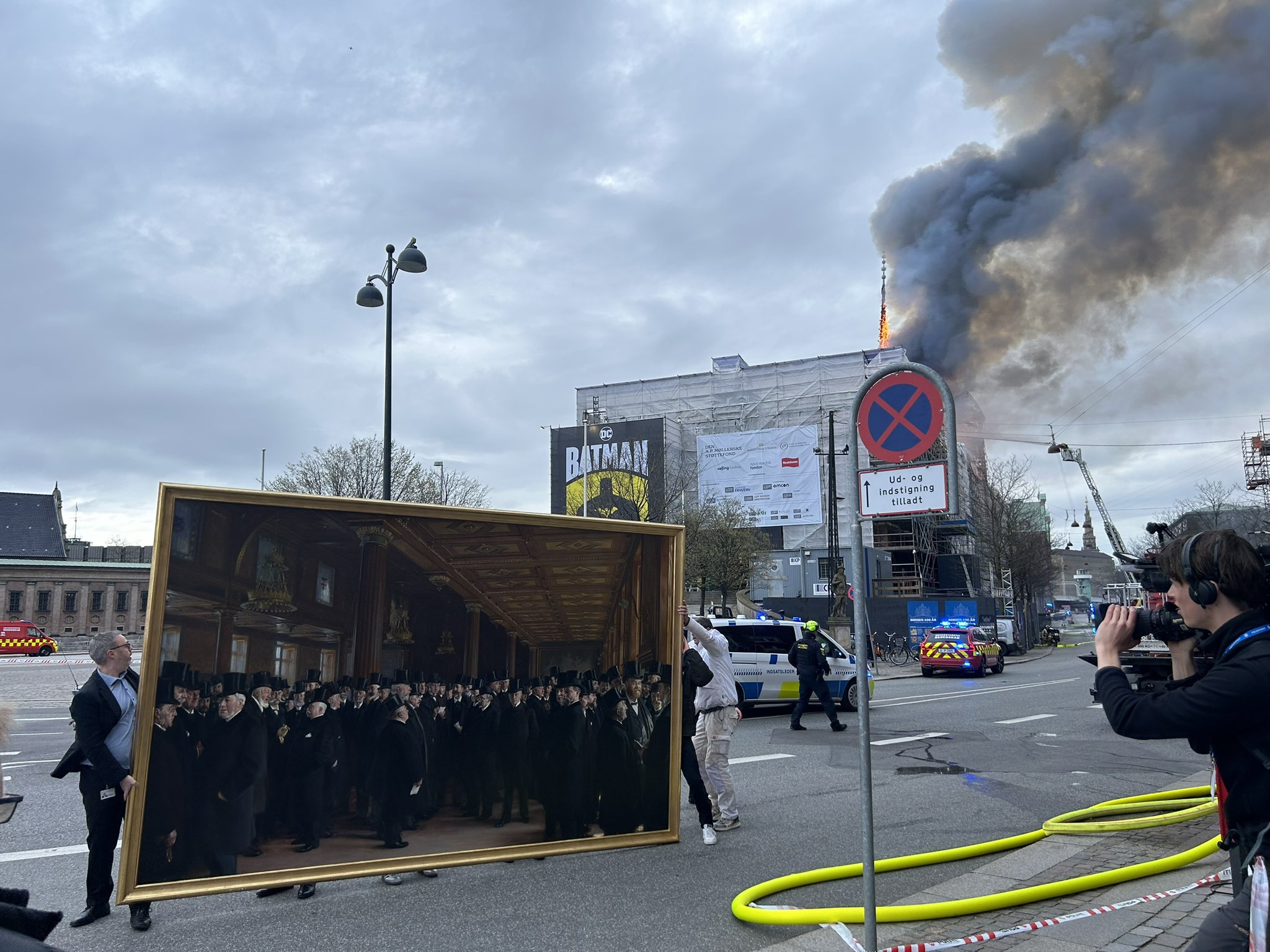
People carrying the painting From Copenhagen Stock Exchange out of the burning Stock Exchange Building, 16 April 2024.

- 4 April:
  - An area up to 7 kilometers from Naval Base Korsør in the Great Belt is closed to shipping and the airspace is closed for hours as a precaution against a missile suddenly being fired from a malfunctioning launcher aboard the frigate Niels Juel.
  - Flemming Lentfer is dismissed as Chief of Defence for failing to report a malfunctioning air defense and ammunitions system aboard the Iver Huitfeldt that was first recorded when it engaged with Houthi militants in the Red Sea in March.
- 16 April:
  - Børsen fire: A fire breaks out in Copenhagen's 17th-century Stock Exchange Building, leading to the collapse of its iconic Dragespir, or dragon spire. There were no reports of any deaths. Important Danish artworks were carried to safety.
  - Argentina and Denmark sign a 2.1 billion kroner ($300 million) deal for the sale of 24 Royal Danish Air Force F-16 Fighting Falcons to Argentina. No date for the F-16s to be handed over to Argentina has been announced.

=== May ===
- 22 May – Authorities issue a temporary ban on the Danish branch of the Bandidos Motorcycle Club, citing threats to public security.
- 28 May – The Folketing rejects a proposal to recognise the State of Palestine.
- 29 May – A fire destroys part of the Legoland Billund Resort.

=== June ===
- 7 June – Prime Minister Mette Frederiksen is assaulted on Kultorvet in Copenhagen. A suspect is arrested.
- 9 June – The 2024 European Parliament election is held.
- 11 June – A Russian national is arrested south of Copenhagen on suspicion of espionage.
- 17 June – The first stage of the Fehmarn Belt fixed link connecting Lolland and Germany is inaugurated.

=== July ===
- 21 July – Anti-whaling activist Paul Watson, the founder of Sea Shepherd, is arrested shortly after arriving in Nuuk, Greenland for a refueling stop aboard the vessel John Paul DeJoria by virtue of an Interpol notice requested by Japan in 2012. He is released on 17 December after the Danish government rejects the extradition request.

=== August ===
- 7 August – The Polish suspect in the attack on Prime Minister Mette Frederiksen on 7 June is convicted by the Copenhagen District Court and sentenced to four months imprisonment, deportation and a ban from entering Denmark for six years following his release.
- 25 August – Two German nationals are killed in a dune collapse in Vorupør.
- 28 August – The government creates three new ministries, including for EU affairs, environmental policy and emergencies management.
- 29 August – A court in Hillerød rejects a request by India to extradite Niels Holck for his role in the Purulia arms drop case in 1995.

=== September ===
- 10 September – A 21-year-old man is arrested on terrorism charges after being accused of committing arson on a Jewish woman's home in Copenhagen.

=== October ===
- 2 October – Two hand grenades are detonated near the Israeli embassy in Copenhagen, damaging the terrace of another building and resulting in the arrest of three Swedish nationals.
- 11 October – Archaeologists announce the discovery of 50 skeletons and other artifacts following a six-month excavation at a Viking-era burial ground outside Åsum.

=== November ===
- 13 November – The Royal House announces an end to the 19th century practice of allowing symbols and labels associated with it to be used by companies, with full implementation expected by 2029.
- 16 November – Victoria Kjær Theilvig becomes the first Danish person to win the Miss Universe pageant.
- 18 November – The government approves a plan to convert 10% of the country's agricultural lands to forest, provide 43 billion kroner ($6.1 billion) in compensation for affected farmers, and plant an additional one billion trees.
- 28 November – A nationwide telecommunications outage occurs following technical difficulties incurred by network provider TDC Net.

=== December ===
- 13 December – British hedge fund trader Sanjay Shah is sentenced to 12 years' imprisonment over tax fraud amounting to 9 billion kroner ($1.3 billion) involving multiple Danish firms. The sentence is the longest recorded for a financial crime in Danish history.

== Art and entertainment ==
- List of Denmark films of 2024
- List of 2024 box office number-one films in Denmark
- List of Danish submissions for the Academy Award for Best International Feature Film

== Sport ==
=== Badminton ===
- 14 January – Anders Antonsen wins gold in the men's single at 2024 Malaysia Open.
- 14–18 February – Denmark wins gold at the 2024 European Men's and Women's Team Badminton Championships in Lodz, Poland.
- 3 March – Mia Blichfeldt wins gold in Women' Single at 2024 German Open.
- 26 May – Viktor Axelsen ins gold in Men's Single and Kim Astrup and Anders Skaarup Rasmussen win gold in Men's Double at 2024 Malaysia Masters.
- 15 September – Viktor Axelsen wins gold in men's single at 2024 Hong Kong Open.
- 3 November – Mia Blichfeldt wins gold in women's sigle at the 2024 Hylo Open.

=== Cycling ===
- 10–14 January – Denmark wins two gold medals, two silver medals and three bronze medals at the 2024 UEC European Track Championships.
- 4 February – Mads Pedersen wins the 2024 Étoile de Bessèges.
- 11 February – Mads Pedersen wins the 2024 Tour de la Provence.
- 25 February – Jonas Vingegaard wins the 2024 O Gran Camiño.
- 10 March – Jonas Vingegaard wins the 2024 Tirreno–Adriatico.
- 24 March – Mads Pedersen wins the 2024 Gent–Wevelgem.
- 2 June – Mads Pedersen wins Stage 1 of the 2024 Critérium du Dauphiné.
- 4 June – Magnus Cort wins Stage 2 of the 2024 Critérium du Dauphiné.
- 10 July – Jonas Vingegaard wins Stage 11 of the 2024 Tour de France.
- 22 September – Simon Andreasen wins gold at the 2024 UCI Mountain Bike Marathon World Championships.

=== Football ===
- 9 May – Silkeborg IF wins the 2023–24 Danish Cup by defeating AGF 1– in the 2024 Danish Cup final.
- 26 May – FC Midtjylland wins the 2023–24 Danish Superliga after drawing 3–3 against Silkeborg IF in the last match of the season.

=== Golf ===
- 28 January – Thorbjørn Olesen wins the 2024 Ras Al Khaimah Championship on the 2024 European Tour.
- 28 April – Rasmus Neergaard-Petersen wins the UAE Challenge on the 2024 Challenge Tour.
- 9 June – Jonathan Gøth-Rasmussen wins the Challenge de Cádiz on the 2024 Challenge Tour.
- 8 September – Rasmus Neergaard-Petersen wins the German Challenge on the 2024 Challenge Tour.
- 25 August – The Danish Golf Championship takes place.
- 1 September – Niklas Nørgaard wins the 2024 British Masters on the 2024 European Tour.
- 15 September – Rasmus Gøjgaard wins Irish Open on the 2024 European Tour.

=== Motorsports ===
- 16 June – Nicklas Nielsen wims the 2024 24 Hours of Le Mans as part of the Ferrari AF Corse team.

=== Swimming ===
- 15 February – Helena Rosendahl Bach wins silver in Women's 200 metre butterfly at the 2024 World Aquatics Championships.

== Deaths ==
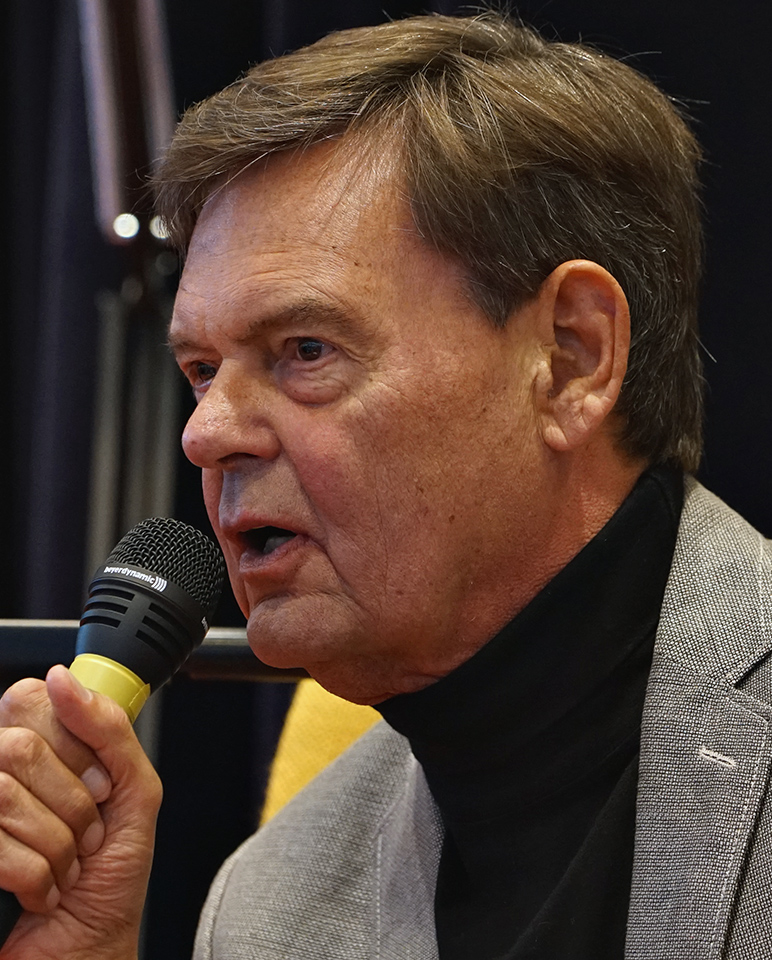
Ulf Pilgaard.

=== January–March ===
- 3 February – Tonny Landy, opera singer (born 1937)
- 16 February – Jan Sørensen, footballer (born 1955)
- 24 February – Ulrik le Fevre, footballer (born 1946)
- 2 March – Søren Pape Poulsen, politician (born 1971)

=== April–June ===
- 11 April – Knud Enggaard, politician (born 1929)

=== July–September ===
- 9 July – Jens Werner, ballroom dancer (born 1964)

=== October–December ===
- 28 October – Ulf Pilgaard, actor (born 1940)
- 30 October – Erik Clausen, filmmaker (born 1942)
- 1 November – Morten Stig Christensen, handballer (born 1954)
- 4 November – Johnny Madsen, singer-songwriter (born 1951)
