= 1966 in Danish television =

This is a list of Danish television related events from 1966.

== Events ==
- 6 February – Ulla Pia is selected to represent Denmark at the 1966 Eurovision Song Contest with her song "Stop – mens legen er go'". She is selected to be the tenth Danish Eurovision entry during Dansk Melodi Grand Prix held at the Tivolis Koncertsal in Copenhagen.

== Births ==
- 29 April – Mayianne Dinesen, TV host
- 5 November – Sofie Stougaard, actress

== See also ==
- 1966 in Denmark
