= 1969 in Danish television =

This is a list of Danish television related events from 1969.

== Television shows ==
- Atten sten i Atlanten
- Squash – især for unge

== Ending this year ==
- Sonja fra Saxogade

== Births ==
- 6 March – Nikolaj Koppel, musician & journalist
- 20 March – Claus Elming, TV host & commentator

== See also ==
- 1969 in Denmark
