= 2027 in Denmark =

- Decades: 2000s; 2010s; 2020s
- See also: Other events of 2027; List of years in Denmark

Events in the year 2027 in Denmark.

== Events ==
=== Scheduled ===
- 1 January – The Capital Region of Denmark is set to merge with Region Zealand on 1 January 2027 to create the Region of Eastern Denmark.

== Sports ==
=== Multi-sport events ===
- 3–9 July – 2027 Island Games in the Faroe Islands
