= Konventum =

Building in Helsingør Municipality, Denmark

Coordinates: 56.0510°N 12.5847°E

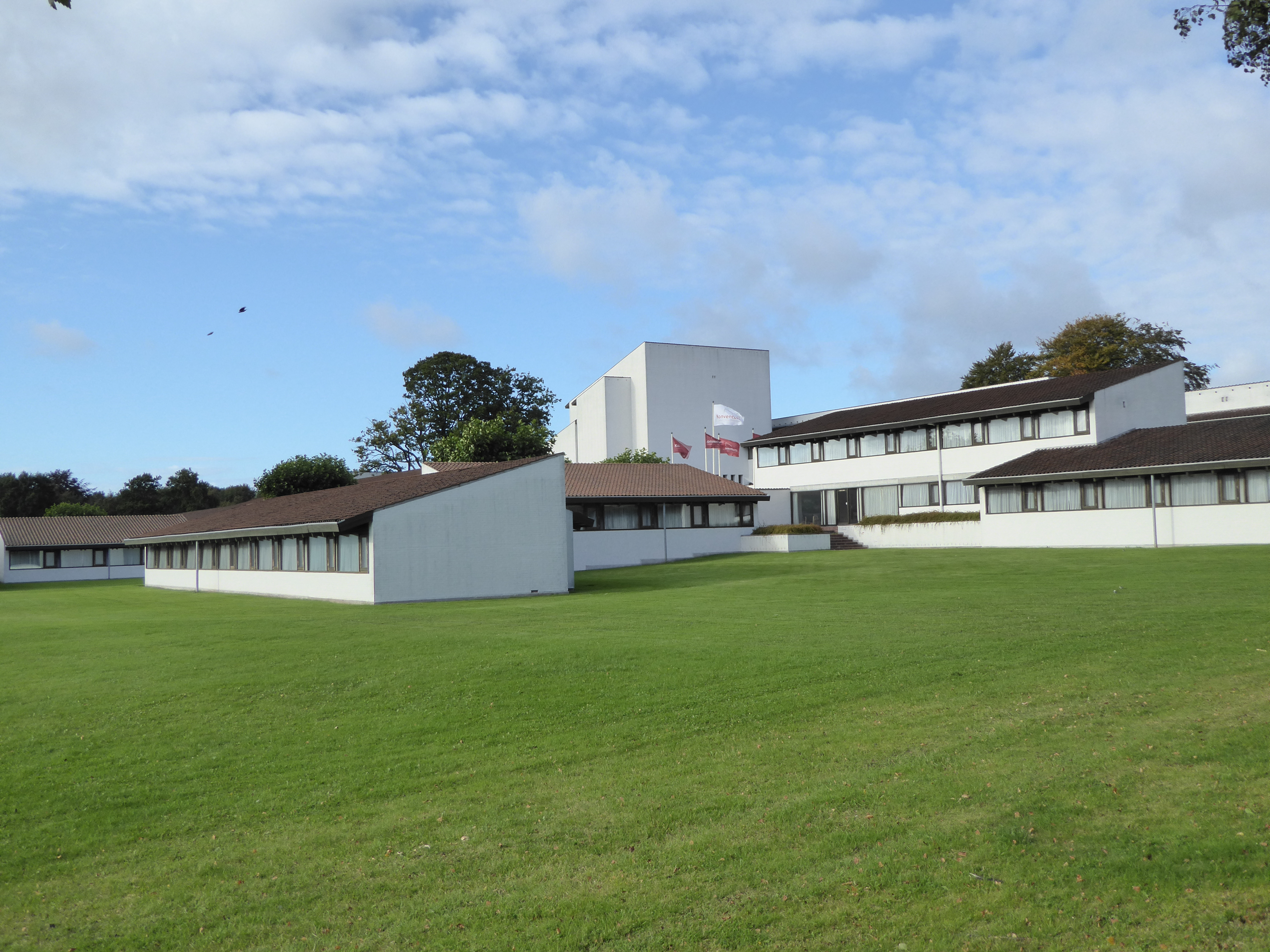
- Konventum seen from the lawn
- Interactive map of Konventum
- Former names: LO-skolen
- Address: Erling Jensens Vej 1, 3000 Helsingør
- Location: Helsingør, Denmark

Construction
- Opened: 1969 (LO-skolen), 2008 (Konventum)
- Expanded: 1984–87

Website
- Official website

Konventum, also known as LO-skolen (English: The LO School), is a conference centre associated with the Danish Confederation of Trade Unions (LO), located in the western outskirts of Helsingør, Denmark. The buildings, a village-like, Modernist complex in a parkland setting, are listed. With a total area of 20,000 square metres, it is the largest conference centre in North Zealand.

== History ==
The Danish Confederation of Trade Unions (LO) opened Esbjerg Højskole in 1910 and Roskilde Højskole in 1920. In the late 1950s, it was decided to build a new school as a replacement for the school in Roskilde but the number of members was growing fast and it was therefore decided to keep all three schools. An architectural competition was launched in 1958. 76 proposals were submitted and the competition was won by Jørn Utzon with a 16-storey highrise proposal and he also took the 3rd prize with a proposal with lower buildings. He withdrew from the project when he won the Sydney Opera House. The project was put on hold for a few years but a building committee was established in 1961 and Jarl Heger and Ebbe and Karen Clemmensen, who had won the 2nd prize in the competition, were assigned to the project in Utzon's place. A study trip to Herning Folk High School convinced the project committee that neither Utzon's highrise design nor Heger and Clemmesen's lowrise proposal would promote social interactions. Jarl Heger and Karen & Ebbe Clemmensen therefore created a new village-like design. The school was inaugurated on 28 May 1969. It was extended in 1974, 1976, 1977, 1978 and 1980 and 1984–1987.

The school's first headmaster was Erling Jensen but he was appointed to Minister of Trade in 1971. He was succeeded by Flemming Skov Jensen who replaced Poul Nyrup Rasmussen as CEO of Lønmodtagernes Dyrtidfond in 1988 and was replaced by Frode Møller Nicolaisen. In 2009 the folk high school was closed and the complex was converted into a conference venue and educational centre.

== Architecture ==
Konventum is built to a village-like design with many smaller buildings, alleys and "squares". Communal facilities are centred around the largest open space Atriumgården while residential quarters are located to the west, south and east. The architecture of the oldest part of the complex is inspired by traditional Japanese architecture while the buildings from the 1980s show inspiration from Arabian architecture.

== Facilities ==
Facilities include four auditoria, 45 meeting rooms, restaurant and 222 hotel rooms.

== Image gallery ==
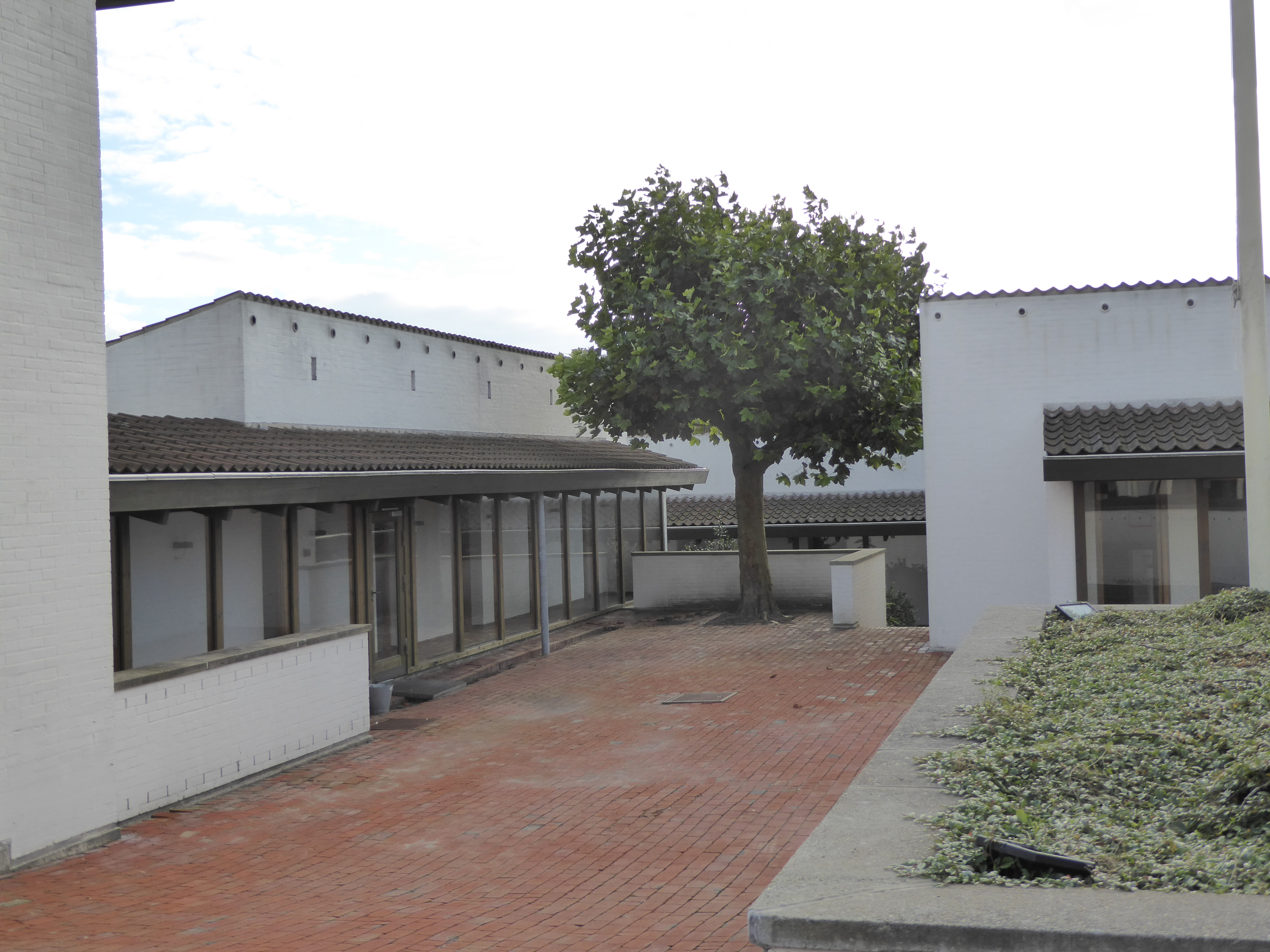

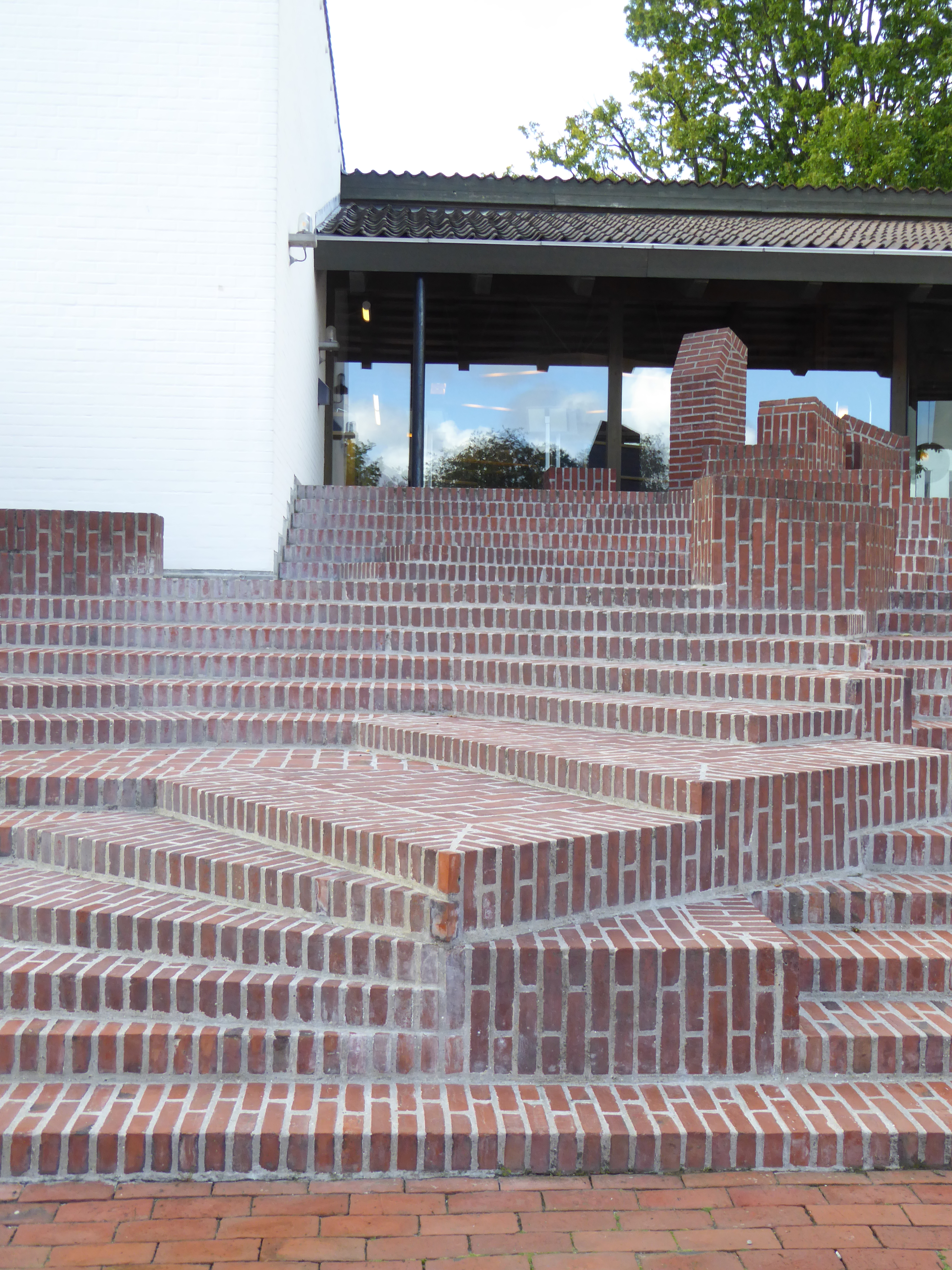

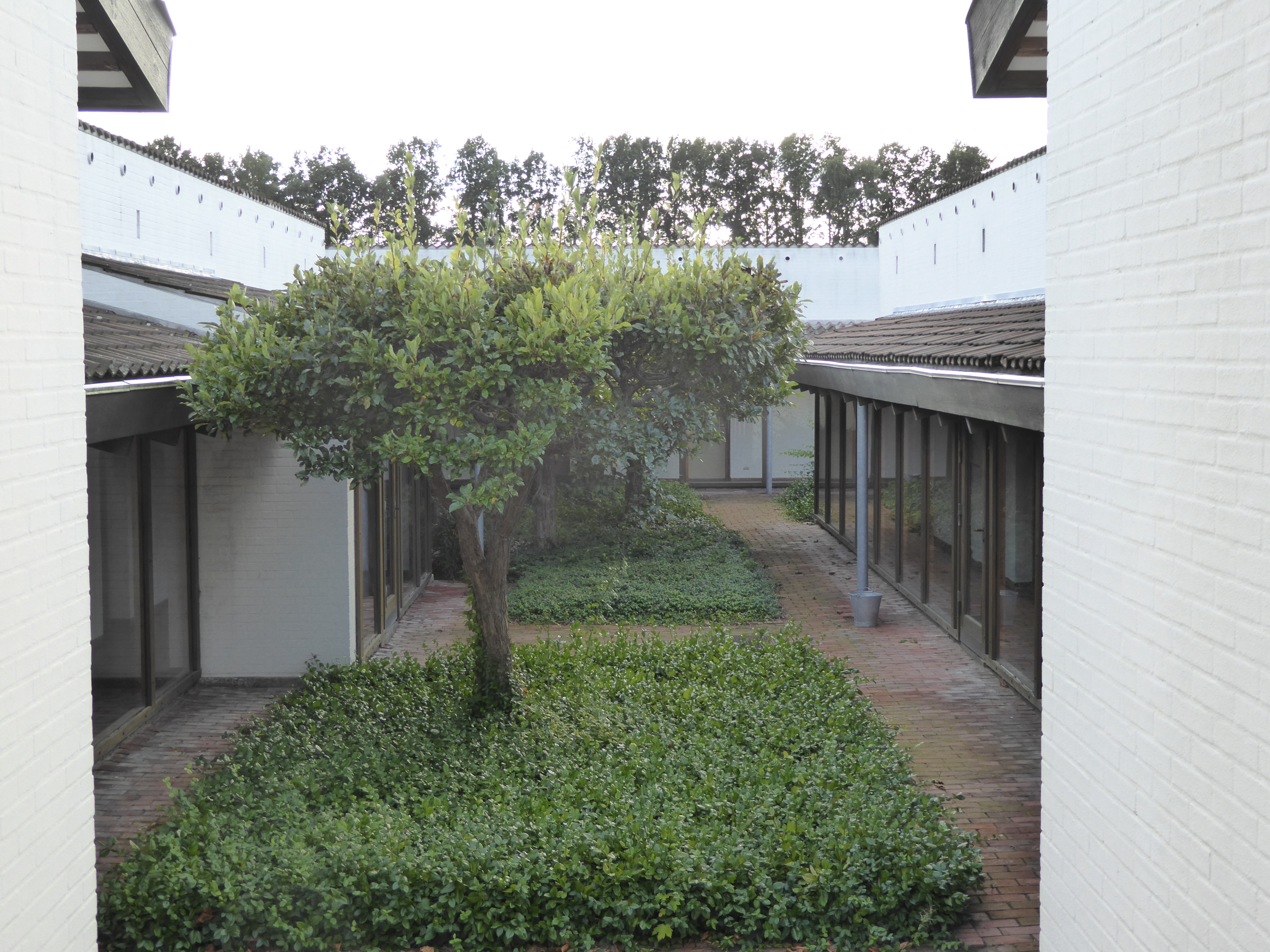
