= 2025 Danish Presidency of the Council of the European Union =

Danish Presidency of the Council of the European Union

- Logo of the 2025 Danish presidency 1 July – 31 December 2025
- Council of the European Union
- Term length: 1 July – 30 December 2025
- Website: denmark25.eu

Presidency trio
- Poland; Denmark; Cyprus

The 2025 Danish Presidency of the Council of the European Union is the second in a trio of rotating Presidency of the Council of the European Union positions held by Denmark.

Denmark succeeded Poland as president on 1 July 2025. The next presidency was held by Cyprus, starting on 1 January 2026.

== Objectives ==
The Danish Presidency refers to "two overarching priorities":

- a secure Europe, and
- a competitive and green Europe.

=== Bulgaria ===
On 8 July 2025, the Council granted final approval to Bulgaria's adoption of the euro on 1 January 2026 by unanimously adopting the final three legal acts. This completes the process for Bulgaria to become the 21st member of the euro area. The documents were signed by Stephanie Lose on behalf of the Danish Presidency of the Council of the EU in the presence of Temenuzhka Petkova, Valdis Dombrovskis, Paschal Donohoe, and Luis de Guindos.
