= Eleanor Margaret Green =

- Princess Viggo of Denmark; Countess of Rosenborg
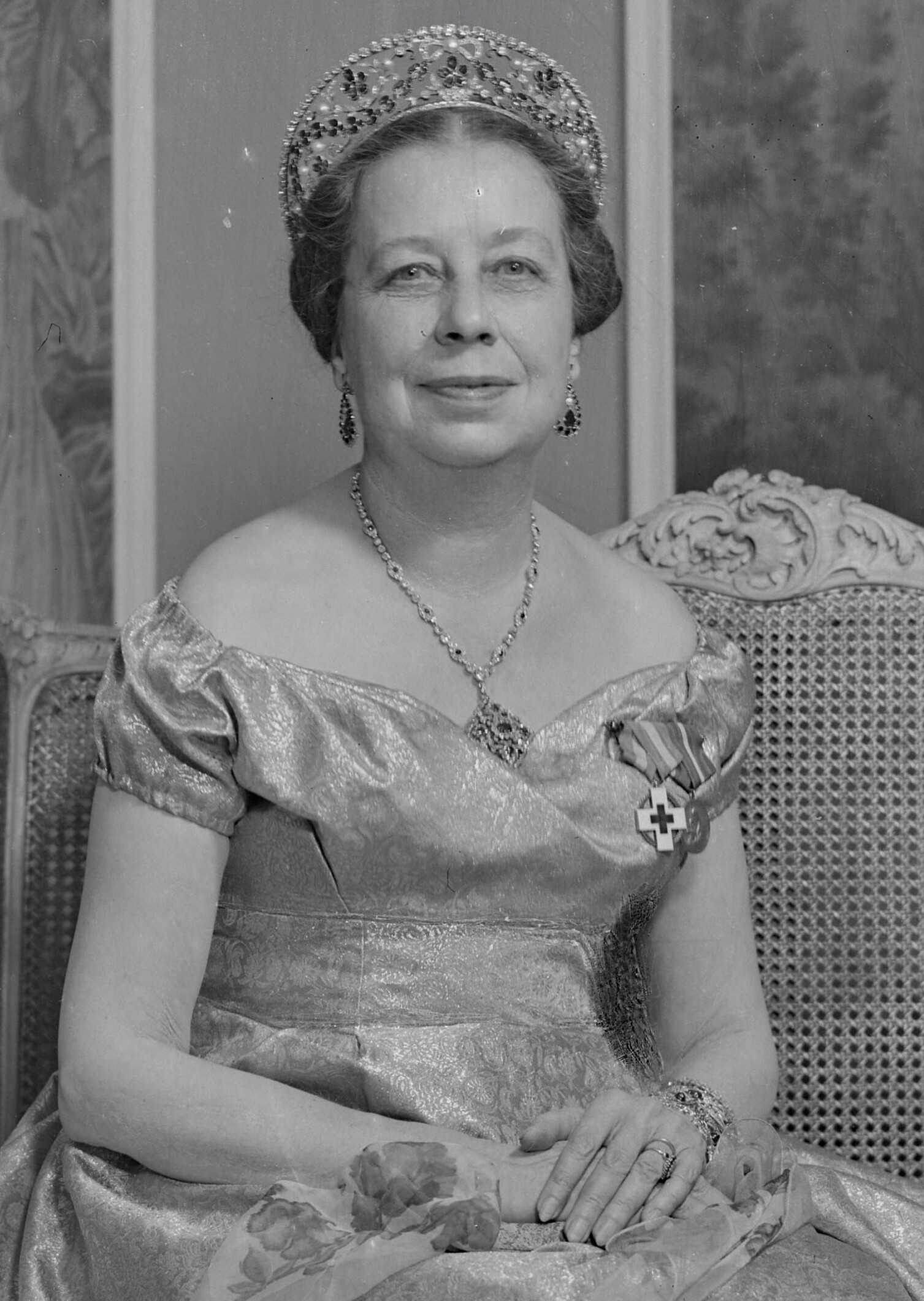
- Princess Viggo of Denmark (née Eleanor Margaret Green) in 1957.
- Born: 5 November 1895; New York City, U.S.
- Died: 3 July 1966 (aged 70); Copenhagen, Denmark
- Burial: Roskilde Cathedral
- Spouse: Prince Viggo, Count of Rosenborg (m. 1924)
- Father: James Oliver Green
- Mother: Amy Bowman Hewitt

Princess Viggo, Countess of Rosenborg (née Eleanor Margaret Green; 5 November 1895 – 3 July 1966) was an American who became a Princess in Denmark. By her marriage to Prince Viggo, Count of Rosenborg, Green became Princess Viggo, Countess of Rosenborg.

== Early life ==
On November 5, 1895, Green was born as Eleanor Margaret Green in New York City, New York. Green's parents were Dr. James Oliver Green and Amelia Hewitt Green. Green's maternal grandfather was Abram S. Hewitt and her maternal great-grandfather was Peter Cooper.

== Personal life ==
Green married Prince Viggo of Denmark, Viggo Christian Adolph George, son of Prince Valdemar of Denmark and Princess Marie Amélie Françoise Hélène d'Orléans, on June 10, 1924, in New York City.

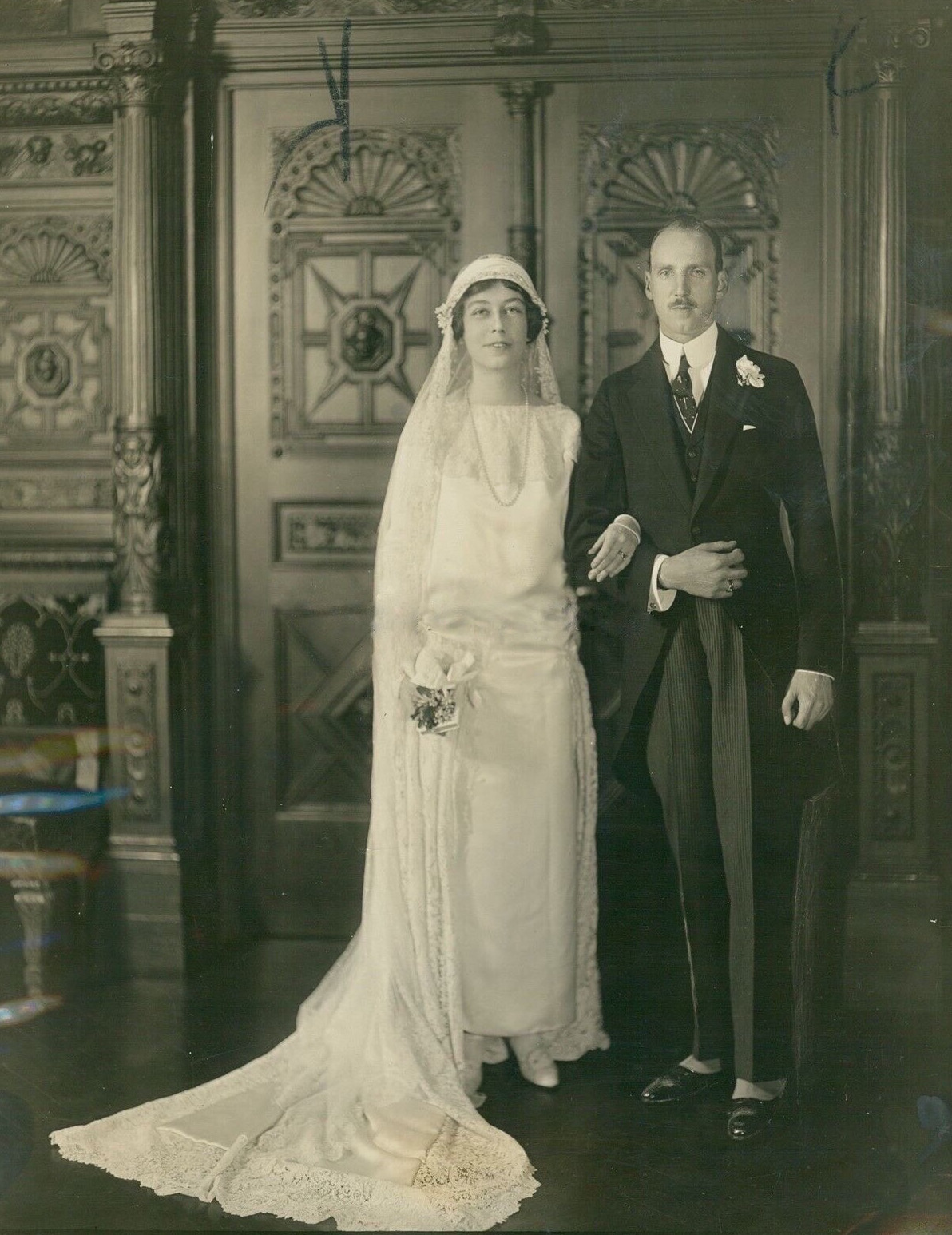
Mrs.Green (now as Princess Vigoo of Denmark) with her husband on their wedding day.

Without the legally required permission of the Danish king for a dynastic marriage, Prince Viggo renounced his place in Denmark's line of succession to the Crown, his title of Prince of Denmark, and his style of Royal Highness as was customary in the Danish royal house upon marriage to a commoner. Before the wedding Viggo, with the king's authorisation, assumed the title of His Highness Prince Viggo, Count of Rosenborg.

In connection with the marriage and her husband's new title, Eleanor Margaret Green became Her Highness Princess Viggo, Countess of Rosenborg.

Prince and Princess Viggo had no children. The couple lived at Bernstorff Palace in Denmark. Princess Viggo was active in charity work.

She died on July 3, 1966, at age 70 at Copenhagen, Denmark.
