= Kurt Ard =

Danish illustrator (1925–2026)

Kurt Ard (December 1925 – June 2026) was a Danish illustrator, painter and graphic artist. He became internationally known for his cover image artworks for newspapers and magazines in the 1950s, 60s and 70s, especially for the Scandinavian magazines Allers and Familie Journal as well as for the German television listings magazine Hörzu.

== Life and career ==
Kurt Ard was born in Copenhagen in December 1925. In 1950 he followed his emigrating family to California, and thereafter began his career in New York City working on various small magazines. Ard was a name that Kurt Savigny Nørstrand took when he lived in the United States, derived from 'art'. Ard worked in the same realistic painterly tradition as the American illustrator Norman Rockwell (1894–1978). In 1953, Ard returned to Denmark, and four years later achieved a breakthrough with cover illustrations for, among others, Hörzu. He was self-taught and similarly to Rockwell, stylistically simple, however he received praise for his often folksy and humorous cover artworks. Like Rockwell, Ard's artistic inspirations drawn from everyday life have been criticised as overly sentimental and kitschy.

His 1960/1961 work “Cowboy Asleep in Beauty Salon” was sold at Christie’s for $126,000 USD on 21 April 2023. He worked, for among publicstions, Scandinavian weekend magazines as well as for the American Saturday Evening Post, Reader’s Digest, and McCall’s. For Hörzu, Ard completed 260 cover images.

Ard was a member of Danish Popular Songwriters and Producers, and wrote music and lyrics for the song Mon Cœur, which in Denmark’s 1966 Melodi Grand Prix (precursor to the Eurovision Song Contest) placed second.

In 1971, Ard moved to Spain, where he lived until his death in June 2026, at the age of 100.

== Selected books ==
- Kurt Ard – so gesehen... Cora Verlag, Hamburg 2004, ISBN 978-3-89941-300-7.
