= Lone Frank =

Danish science journalist

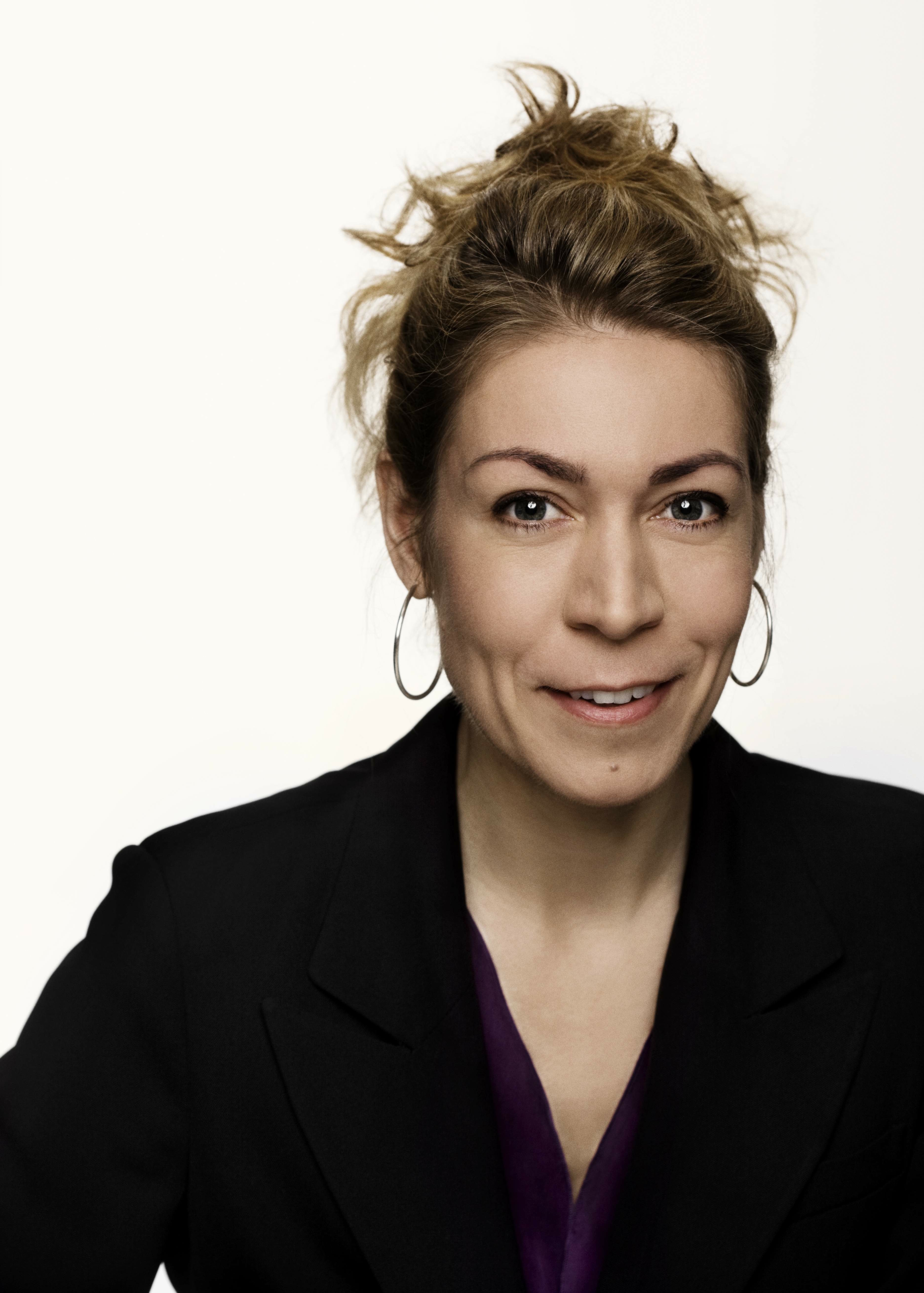
- Born: 22 September 1966 (age 59)
- Education: Århus University
- Scientific career
- Fields: Intelligence
- Thesis: transcriptional regulation of glutamate receptors in cerebral ischemia (1992)

Lone Frank (born Lone Frank Pedersen 1966 in Århus) is a Danish science journalist, author and PhD in neurobiology. Since 1998 she has written for newspapers. She is also a commentator and lecturer and has worked in radio and television; including organized and participated in science series on television, talking about controversial issues such as heritability of IQ and race and intelligence. She received her master's degree in biology on a thesis about "the transcriptional regulation of glutamate receptors in cerebral ischemia" from Aarhus University in 1992.

In September 2011 her book, My Beautiful Genome: Exposing Our Genetic Future, One Quirk at a Time was released to positive reviews. The book is based on a number of genetic-based tests, which aims to clarify the biological context of human personal development. It was also released in German, Norwegian and Dutch.

== Bibliography ==
- Mindfield: How Brain Science is Changing Our World, 2009, Oneworld Publications, ISBN 978-1-85168-649-0
- My Beautiful Genome: Discovering Our Genetic Future, One Quirk at a Time, 2011, Oneworld Publications, ISBN 978-1-85168-833-3
- The Pleasure Shock: The Rise of Deep Brain Stimulation and Its Forgotten Inventor, 2018, Penguin Publishing Group ISBN 978-1-101-98653-0
