= Ittai Gradel =

Israeli-born Danish antiques dealer (1965–2026)

- Born: 29 January 1965; Haifa, Israel
- Died: 28 April 2026 (aged 61); Denmark
- Occupations: Academic; author; antiquities dealer

Ittai Gradel (29 January 1965 – 28 April 2026) was a British-Danish academic and antiquities dealer known for exposing thefts of artefacts from the British Museum.

== Early life ==
Ittai Gradel was born in Haifa, Israel, on 29 January 1965. His father was British and his mother Danish, and he was the second child after his brother, Kim Oren Gradel. The family was Jewish, and moved to Denmark when he was two. Gradel held British citizenship via his father, but due to Denmark not allowing dual citizenship until 1 September 2015, he never obtained Danish citizenship. Gradel had a strong interest in the British Museum, and after he finished school at the age of 18, he went to London where he worked part-time on the London Underground and in a fish-and-chip shop, spending his free time at the museum. He returned to Denmark and studied archaeology at Aarhus University, receiving an MA in Classical Archaeology in 1988. He also received his D.Phil. in Ancient History from the University of Oxford in 1995. He wrote his thesis on Roman imperial cult in ancient Rome.

== Career ==
Gradel held various positions at Aarhus University and the University of Copenhagen, and he was a visiting fellow at Brasenose College, Oxford in 2004–5. He also worked in the Department of Classics, University of Reading from 2005 to 2008.

Gradel had published numerous articles on Roman history, religion, epigraphy and archaeology. In 2002, Gradel authored a monograph Emperor Worship and Roman Religion, since considered a standard text on Roman religious practices and later published as a paperback in 2004. In 2025, he published a book with Nils Arne Pedersen titled The Lost Novel of King Solomon and the Demons.

He became dissatisfied with life in academia, and returned to Denmark with his wife. Gradel first lived in Copenhagen for several years, and eventually settled in Rudkøbing, Langeland. He worked as a dealer specialising in gems from classical antiquity, using his knowledge of the subject to identify artefacts often misdated and miscategorised.

=== Discovery of thefts at the British Museum ===
Gradel first bought items from a seller named sultan1966 on eBay in 2014. The seller informed Gradel that he inherited the items from his grandfather who owned a junk shop in York between the wars, and over the years Gradel bought around 70 items from the seller. He became suspicious about the provenance of objects offered for sale by sultan1966 in 2016 when he saw a first-century Roman cameo featuring the fertility god Priapus listed for sale for £40 (but actually worth £15,000). He recognised the item from a line drawing in a 1920s book on British Museum's gem collection, but it was quickly removed from eBay listing. In 2020, he noticed a photo in a book a fragment of a cameo from the British Museum that was previously offered for sale by another dealer; on checking with the seller Gradel found that the olive-green sardonyx was originally sold by sultan1966. Checking his own purchases, the British Museum's records and other sources he found three items that could be proven to be from the museum's collection. He suspected that all the items he bought from the seller as well as 150 items he purchased from a third party originated from the museum. He was later informed by a retired keeper that one collection of 942 uncatalogued gems at the museum was found to have only seven left when checked.

Gradel alerted the museum to his suspicions of thefts via an intermediary in 2020, but due to the Covid lockdown mandated at that time, it was deemed not possible to investigate the missing items. In February 2021 Gradel contacted the deputy director Jonathan Williams with a dossier of evidence linking the items being sold by sultan1966 to Peter Higgs, who was a curator of the Greece and Rome department in the museum. He also wrote to the museum director Hartwig Fischer. Williams, however, responded in July 2021 that a "thorough investigation" had revealed no wrongdoing among members of the staff and that "the objects concerned are all accounted for". The following year Gradel contacted a trustee of the museum Paul Ruddock, who passed on his concerns to George Osborne, chairman of the board of trustees. A second investigation was initiated, and it was found that more than 300 registered items had been stolen or damaged, and more than a thousand unregistered items were missing.

The revelation of the stolen artefacts led to the resignation of the museum director Hartwig Fischer and the deputy director Jonathan Williams. Fischer had previously attempted to accuse Gradel of withholding information on other missing items. Peter Higgs, alleged to have stolen the items, was dismissed and the museum pursued a civil case against him for the theft of over 1,800 items. The revelation of thefts at the museum led to renewed calls for the return of artefacts such as the Elgin Marbles and Benin Bronzes.

Gradel returned 61 items he purchased from eBay directly to the British Museum. He deposited a larger set of 270 gems he suspected to be from the museum with the Thorvaldsens Museum, which repatriated the gems to the British Museum.

Gradel was named Personality of the Year by Apollo Magazine in 2024.

== Death ==
Gradel was diagnosed with renal cancer in 2010, which returned in 2022. He died from the disease on 28 April 2026, aged 61. He received an award from the British Museum in recognition of his "very significant contribution" days before his death.
