= Gundorph Albertus =

Danish silversmith

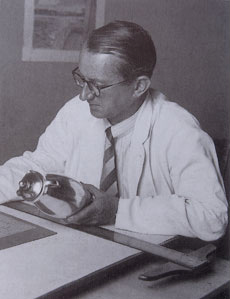
- Born: 16 January 1887; Hillerød, Denmark
- Died: 26 December 1969 (aged 82)
- Occupation: Silversmith

Gundorph Albertus (16 June 1887 - 26 December 1969) was a Danish silversmith who worked for Georg Jensen A/S. He created the Cactus and Mitra flatware patterns.

== Early life and education ==
Albertus completed a chaser's apprenticeship in 1905 and then as a silversmith in Munich in 1909. After working a few years in Munich and Paris, he then enrolled at the Royal Danish Academy of Fine Arts' sculpture school until 1915. He spent a year at the École des arts décoratifs in Paris.

== Career ==
Still a student at the Art Academy in Copenhagen, Albertus began working as a chaser for Georg Jensen in his silversmithy. He was deputy director of the company from 1926 to 1954 and was appointed to head of production following Georg Jensen's death in 1935.
