= Erik Hagens =

Danish painter and illustrator (born 1940)

Erik Hagens (born 21 April 1940) is a Danish painter and illustrator. He is best known for his 40-metre-long mural Esbjerg-evangeliet.

== Biography ==
Born in Copenhagen, Hagens is the son of the civil engineer Poul Gunnar Hagens and Elsa Margareta Silwer, a weaver. He studied painting at the Royal Danish Academy of Fine Arts from 1961 to 1966 and was trained as a lithographer at the experimental art school, Eks-skolen. In the 1960s, he became an active participant in the cross-border experiments in art and life.

From the 1970s, his works have been inspired by the development of the consumer society with the effects of industrialization, pollution, road traffic and entertainment centres as, for example, in his 1977 painting Københavns Vinterbane (Copenhagen's Winter Track) based on an annual cycling event in Copenhagen. However, there is less emphasis on the cycling than on the people attending the event who are all intent on making a quick fortune.

Among Hagens' most significant works are the enamels he created together with his wife Ursula Munch-Petersen for Espergærde Bibliotek in 1990 and the 40-metre long mural Esbjerg-evangeliet (2003–05) he made for the CVU-Vest social school in Esbjerg. It depicts modern scenes based on some of the better known Bible stories, mostly with a humorous touch.

== Awards ==
In 1997, Hagens received the Eckersberg Medal and in 2008, the Thorvaldsen Medal.
