= Ursula Munch-Petersen =

Danish ceramist

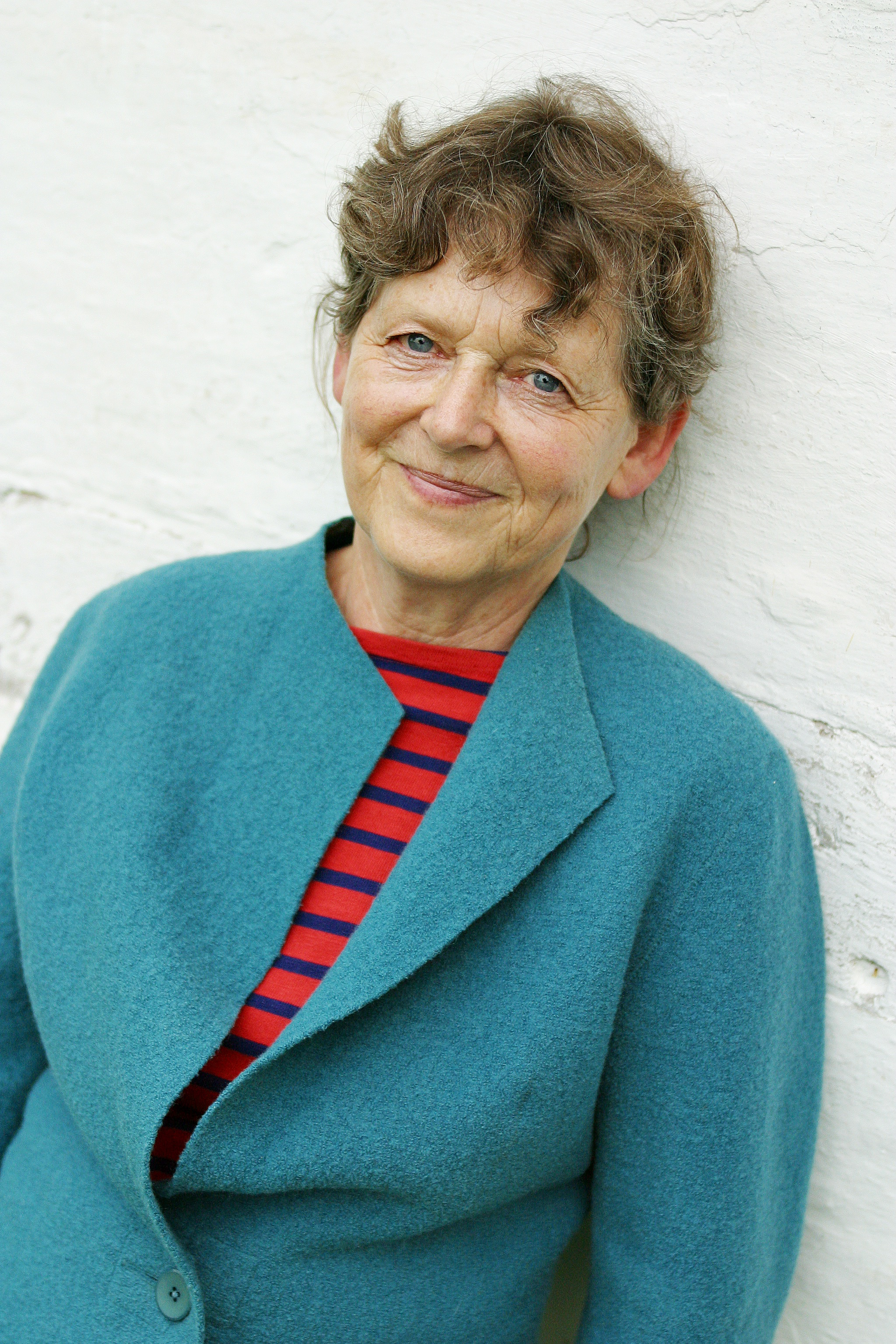
Image of Ursula Munch-Petersen

Ursula Munch-Petersen (29 December 1937 – 29 June 2025) was a Danish ceramist.

== Biography ==
Born in Rønne on the island of Bornholm, Ursula Munch-Petersen was the daughter of Gustaf and Lisbeth Munch-Petersen, both of whom were also ceramists and potters. She attended the Kunsthåndværkerskolen (design school) in Copenhagen from 1956 to 1960 and the Royal Danish Academy of Fine Arts from 1970 to 1972. In 1962, she married the artist Erik Hagens. She grew up on Bornholm and after graduating from the Academy, worked for a year in the family business in Rønne. In 1978, she acquired her own studio on Møn.

Munch-Petersen's work extends from artistically designed individual items to mass-produced series of tableware. In the 1960s, she designed for Bing and Grøndahl but later worked for Royal Copenhagen. Her Ursula series is produced by Kähler Keramik.

She died 29 June 2025 in Copenhagen.

== Awards ==
In 1994 Munch-Petersen received the Thorvald Bindesbøll Medal, in 2002 the Prince Eugen Medal, in 2004 the Georg Jensen Prize and in 2016 the C. F. Hansen Medal.
