= 2026 North Zealand train collision =

Train collision in Denmark

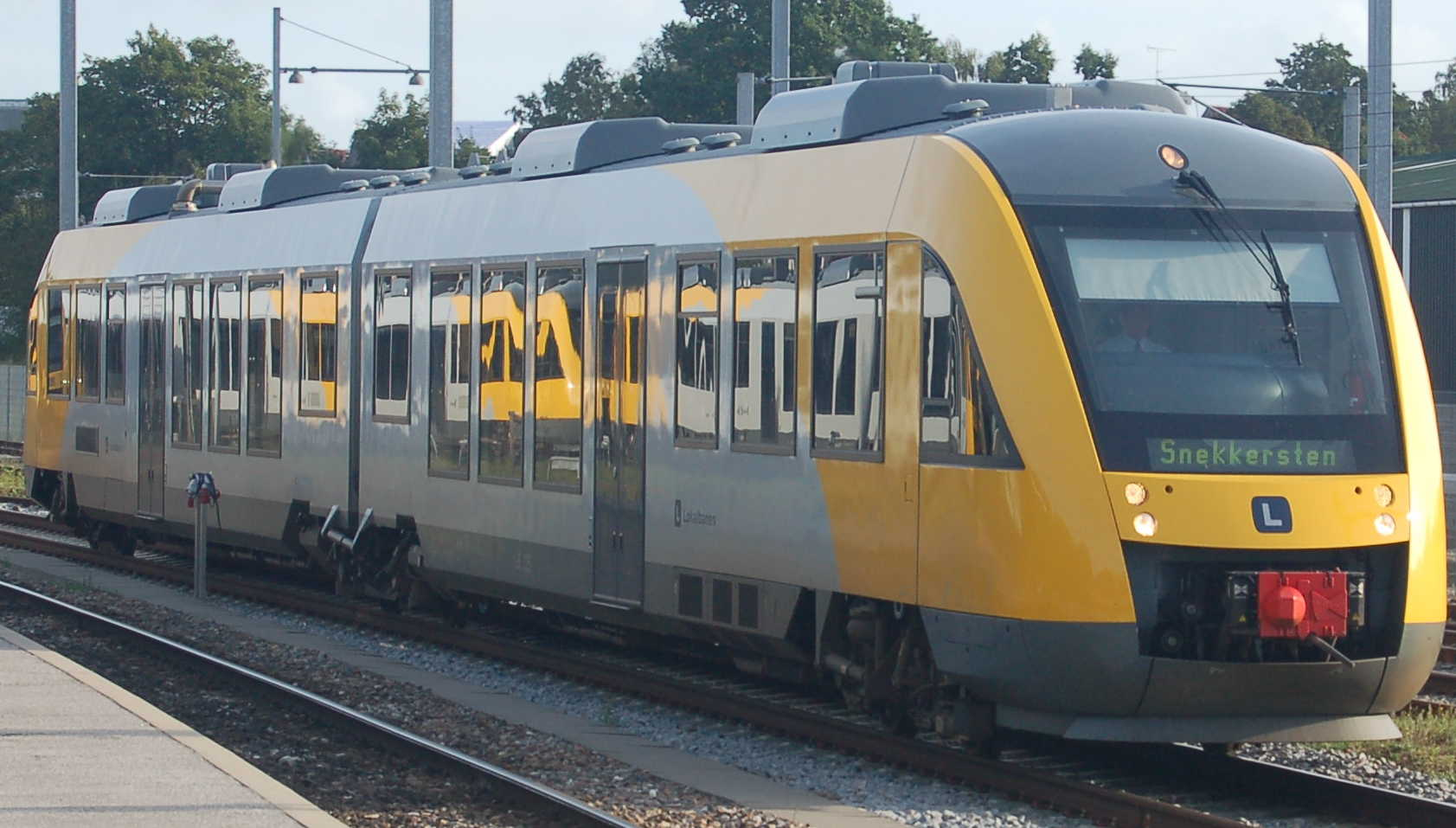
- The trains involved were Alstom Coradia LINTs.

Details
- Date: April 23, 2026; 6:29 CET
- Location: Near Hillerød, Capital Region
- Country: Denmark
- Line: Gribskov Line
- Operator: Lokaltog
- Incident type: Head-on collision on single track
- Cause: Under investigation

Statistics
- Trains: 2
- Passengers: 37
- Deaths: 0
- Injured: 18

On April 23, 2026, two passenger trains transporting a total of 37 people collided head-on near Hillerød in the Capital Region of Denmark, injuring at least 18 people, including five critically. Claus Pedersson, safety director at Lokaltog, described the collision as "one of the worst we can imagine in the railway industry".

== Collision ==
The collision occurred at a level crossing at Isterødvejen near Hillerød, a town north of Copenhagen. The details surrounding the collision are unclear, but police said the trains were travelling fast. Each train was operated by an Alstom Coradia LINT. Two yellow and grey trains with visible damage to the front were pictured in a wooded area. Glass from the windshields and windows were scattered. A large number of ambulances and police cars were dispatched and all the passengers were evacuated and the injured transported to hospitals.

== Victims ==
Eighteen people were injured, including five critically. The critically injured were flown to the National Hospital in Copenhagen. Among the injured were several Lokaltog staff members. People who were not physically hurt were offered assistance.

== Investigation ==
The Accident Investigation Board Denmark arrived at the scene and Inspector Morten Pedersen of North Zealand police said they would be working together to find out what had happened. The board's railway unit manager, Klaus Jensen, told broadcaster TV 2 News that investigators are looking at "all hypotheses", including "a failure in the signalling system, or whether there may have been a failure due to human factors".

== See also ==
- Great Belt Bridge rail accident
