= Mads Lundby Hansen =

Danish economist (1969–2023)

- Born: 21 September 1969
- Died: 5 June 2023 (aged 53); Herlev
- Occupation: Economist
- Children: 2

Academic background
- Education: Bornholms Amtsgymnasium, University of Copenhagen

Mads Lundby Hansen (21 September 1969 – 5 June 2023) was a Danish economist, liberal debater and chief economist at the think tank Cepos.

== Education ==
Mads Lundby Hansen graduated from Bornholms Amtsgymnasium in 1989. During his high gymnasium years, together with later commentator and debater Jarl Cordua, he was active in Venstres Ungdom on Bornholm. Lundby Hansen was educated as a Master of Political Science from the University of Copenhagen in 1996.

== Career ==
Lundby Hansen then got work as an economist in the Ministry of Economy's international office and in 1998 took a similar position in the Ministry of Finance's tax policy office. From 2001 to 2005, he was chief economist in Venstre at Christiansborg during Anders Fogh Rasmussen's prime ministership. From 2005 he switched to the newly founded right wing-liberal (Danish: borgerlig-liberale) think tank Cepos, where he was a carrying force in his function as chief economist and deputy director until his death in 2023. He taught at the economics department at the University of Copenhagen for a number of years in the 2000s.

Lundby Hansen was considered among Denmark's most influential and prominent economists and was widely recognised for his ability to communicate economic issues to the public and shape the agenda. His topissue was to abolish the Danish top tax (topskat), which he argued for eagerly in various contexts. In the years 2012 until 2014, he was according to Dagbladet Børsen the most quoted economist in the Danish media, as well as the 2021 most quoted expert by the Danish press. From 2017 to 2023 he was a member of Det Økonomiske Råd (The Economic Council). In 2020, Lundby Hansen was nominated by the newspaper Berlingske for the Fonsmark Award awarded to agenda-setting right-wing personalities.

== Death ==
On 5 June 2023, Mads Lundby Hansen died due to cancer following long-time illness at the age of 53 at Herlev Hospital. He left behind a wife and two children. Lundby Hansen was interred at Sorgenfri Church on 10 June.
