= Bodil Nyboe Andersen =

Danish central banker and economist (1940–2025)

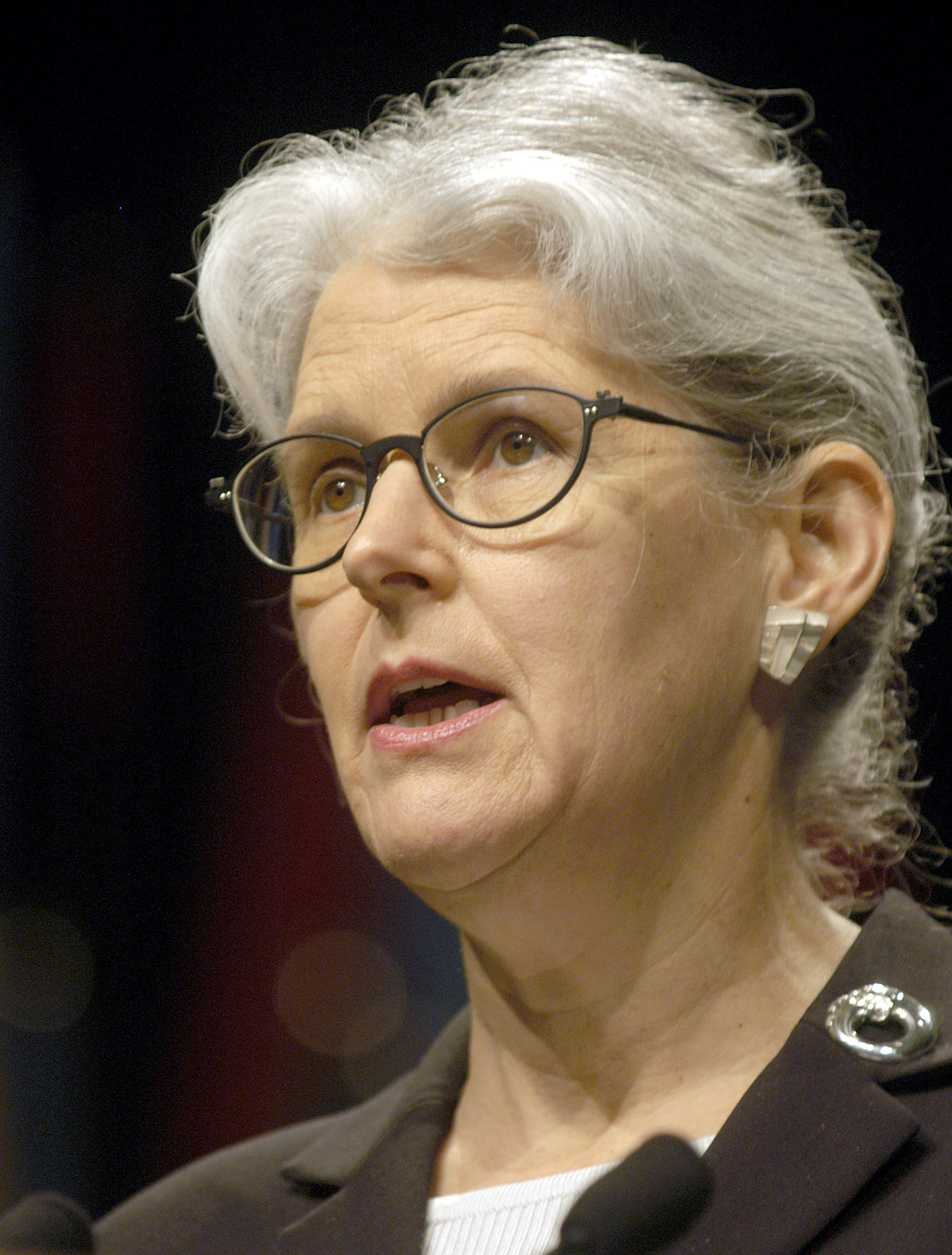
Bodil Nyboe Andersen

Bodil Nyboe Andersen (9 October 1940 – 27 November 2025) was a Danish economist who was the governor of the National Bank of Denmark from 1995 to 2005. She had previously taught at the University of Copenhagen's Department of Economics and in 1981 served on the board of directors of Andelsbanken (later Unibank), where she became director. Nyboe Andersen was Denmark's first female bank director.

== Early life and education ==
Born on 9 October 1940 in the Frederiksberg district of Copenhagen, Nyboe Andersen was the daughter of the economist and politician Poul Frode Nyboe Andersen (1913–2004) and the teacher Edith (Ditte) Valborg Asmand Raben (1913–1993). After matriculating from Rungsted State School in 1959, she was one of just three women to study political science at the University of Copenhagen, graduating with flying colours in 1966. Her parents helped found Krogerup Folk High School therefore she grew up around political personalities, including headmaster and theologian Hal Koch and his wife, Minister of Church Affairs Bodil Koch. She was fascinated by talks about the Marshall Plan and Greenland. As a young academic, she worked at the economic secretariat in the Ministry of Economic Affairs (doing forecasts before formal models were used), taught at both the business college and university, and then moved fully into university work in May 1968.

== Career ==
Her first appointment was in the economic secretariat of the Ministry of Economic Affairs but when her father became minister in 1968, she moved to the economics department at the University of Copenhagen where she served as a member of the board. In 1981, she relieved her father of his position as director of Andelsbanken. Together with her colleague A.C. Jacobsen, she contributed to the bank's modernization and efficiency. In parallel, she served on the boards of the Danish Bankers Association (Bankforeningen) (1985–1990), Payment Business Service (Pengeinstitutternes Betalings Service) (1988–1990) and the Great Belt Fixed Link (Storebæltsforbindelsen) (1987–1991). Following Andelbanken's merger in 1990, she served on the board of Unidanmark and Unibank.

Also in 1990, she moved to the National Bank, replacing Erik Hoffmeyer as governor in 1995. In this position, she exhibited a high degree of the logic and clarity she had acquired as an academic.

== Death ==
Nyboe Andersen died on 27 November 2025, at the age of 85.

== Awards ==
In connection with her retirement as governor of the National Bank, in 2006 Nyboe Andersen was honoured with the Grand Cross of the Order of the Dannebrog, an exceptionally high honour.

In 1989, she was named Årets erhvervskvinde (Danish Businesswoman of the Year).
