= Susi Hyldgaard =

Danish jazz singer and composer

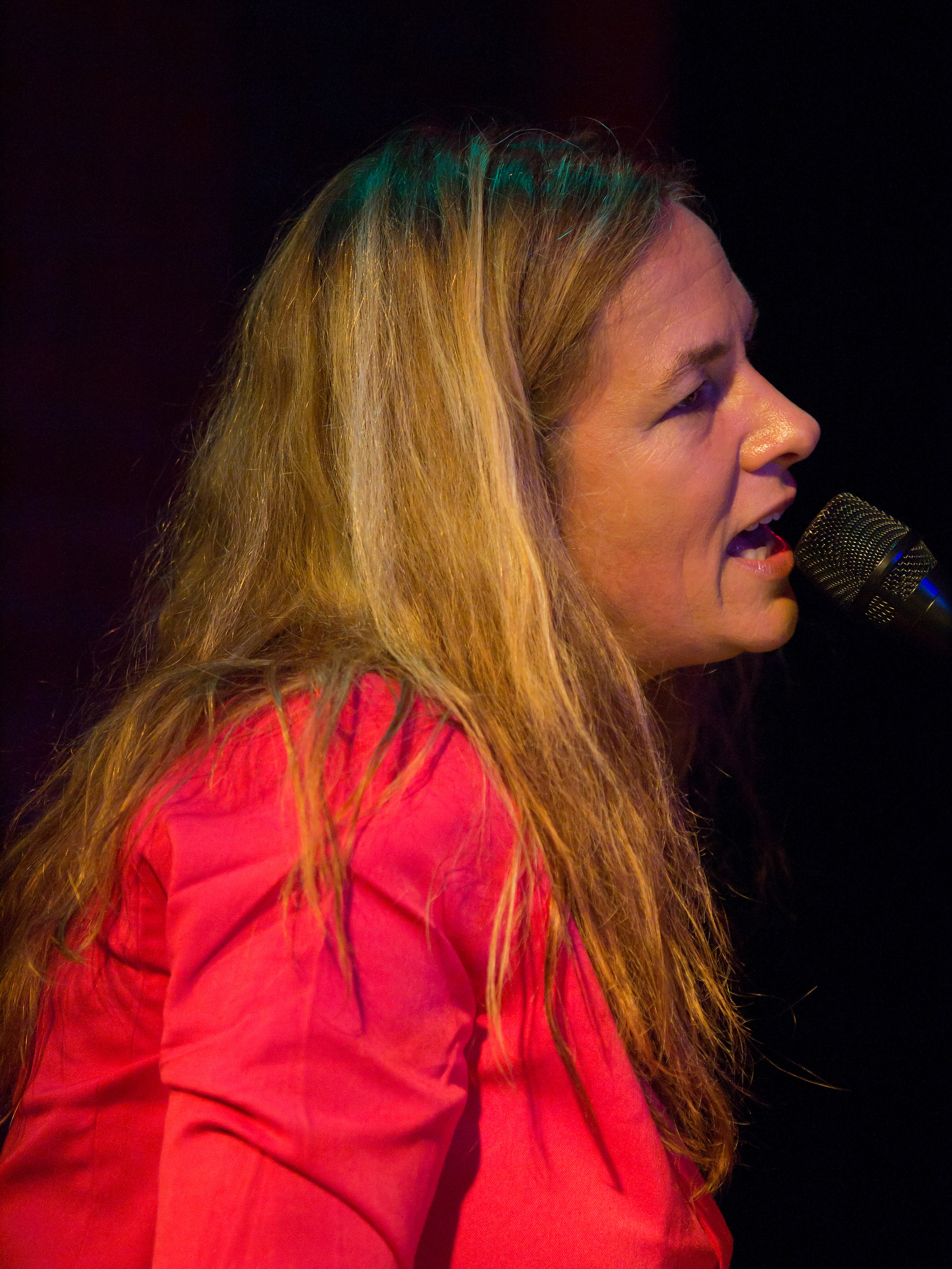
Susi Hyldgaard (2011)

Susi Hyldgaard (17 June 1963 — 21 January 2023) was a Danish jazz singer and composer. Although she studied music in Boston and Copenhagen, she first worked as a reporter for Danmarks Radio. It was only in 1996 that she turned to singing with her album My Female Family. She went on to perform a blend of rock, pop and funk, later concentrating mainly on jazz. Hyldgaard became well known for her performances in Germany, Canada and the United States. For six years, she headed the Danish jazz composers union DJBFA (Danske Jazz, Beat og Folkemusik Autorer) until she became ill in 2019.

== Early life and education ==
Born on 17 June 1963 in New York City, Susi Hyldgaard was the daughter of a double bass player who performed in various bands and a mother who was more interested in classical music. She moved to Denmark with her family and from the age of five was trained as a classical pianist. After graduating from Holte Gymnasium in 1984, she returned to the United States where she studied piano under Lars Brogaard at the Berklee College of Music in Boston. While continuing to study music at the University of Copenhagen, she associated with the female singing group Go Four where she developed her flair for jazz.

== Career ==
From 1985 to 1990, Hyldgaard worked as a journalist for Danmarks Radio. It was not until 1996 that she released her first album My Female Family, followed by Something Special Just For You for which in 2000 she received a Danish Grammy as Best Jazz Newcomer.

In the early 2000s, she collaborated with the double-bassist Niels-Henning Ørsted Pedersen, the trombonist Nils Landgren and the guitarist Dalia Faitelson. Moving increasingly into jazz, she was recognized for albums including Blush (2006), Magic Words (2007) and It's Love We Need (2009). In addition to Germany where she released four albums on the Enja label, she also performed in Canada and the United States.

Together with the writer Dorte Schou, in 2015 she published the humorous Lorteklubben – når man skal, så skal man! (Poop Club - When You Have To Go, You Have To Go), introducing small children to the importance of going to the toilet. Hyldgaard was also an effective union organizer and chaired the composers union DJBFA for six years until she retired for poor health in 2019.

Susi Hyldgaard died on 21 January 2023, aged 59, after suffering from a brain tumor. After first marrying the jazz composer Halfdan E. Nielsen, with whom she had her first daughter, she was later married to the wine expert Anders Scheuer. She left two daughters.
