= List of years in Danish music =

This page indexes the individual year in Danish music pages. Each year is annotated with a significant event as a reference point.

2010s - Pre-2010s

== 2010s ==
- 2019 in Danish music
- 2018 in Danish music
- 2017 in Danish music, deaths of Nicolai Munch-Hansen, and Svend Asmussen.
- 2016 in Danish music, deaths of Else Marie Pade, Karina Jensen, Ove Verner Hansen, and Pelle Gudmundsen-Holmgreen.
- 2015 in Danish music, death of Jørgen Ingmann.
- 2014 in Danish music
- 2013 in Danish music
- 2012 in Danish music
- 2011 in Danish music
- 2010 in Danish music

== Pre-2010s ==
- 2009 in Danish music
