= 2017 in Danish music =

The following is a list of notable events and releases of the year 2017 in Danish music.

== Events ==
=== January ===
- 5 – Royal Danish Opera announces that its artistic director, Sven Müller, will leave his position in 2017, three years ahead of schedule. Müller is believed to have resigned because of financial cuts.

=== February ===
- 25 – At the 47th edition of the Dansk Melodi Grand Prix, "Where I Am", performed by Anja Nissen, is selected as Denmark's entry for the Eurovision Song Contest.

=== March ===
- 28 – Under its new conductor Fabio Luisi, the Danish National Symphony Orchestra begins a tour of the United States.
- 31 – The live final of X Factor (Denmark) is won by Morten Nørgaard.

=== May ===
- 13 – In the final of the Eurovision Song Contest 2017, Denmark finish in 20th place.
- 31 – The 19th Distortion festival started in Copenhagen (May 31 - June 4).

=== June ===
- 17 – The 8th NorthSide Festival opened in Aarhus (June 17–19).
- 22 – The 8th Copenhell festival started in Copenhagen (June 22–24).
- 24
  - The 3rd Tinderbox Festival started in Odense (June 24–27).
  - The 47th Roskilde Festival opened (June 24 - July 1).
- 28 – The 33rd Nibe Festival started in Nordjylland (June 28 - July 1).

=== July ===
- 7 – The 38th Copenhagen Jazz Festival start in Copenhagen (July 7 – 16).
- 13 – G! Festival opened in Göta, Eysturoy, Faroe Islands (July 13–15).
- 14 – The 29th Aarhus Jazz Festival started (July 14–22).

=== August ===
- 2 – The Strøm Fesatival started in Copenhagen (August 2–5).

=== September ===
- 6 – The Copenhagen World Music Festival started (September 6–10).

== Album releases ==
=== January ===
Day	Album	Artist	Label	Notes	Ref.
27	Godspeed	Morten Schantz	Edition Records	Produced by Morten Schantz with Kristian Thomsen	

=== May ===
Day	Album	Artist	Label	Notes	Ref.
19	Can't Steal the Music	Aura Dione	Island, Universal, Koolmusic		

=== November ===
Day	Album	Artist	Label	Notes	Ref.
24	Vista	August Rosenbaum	Tambourhinoceros		

== Deaths ==
February

- 7 – Svend Asmussen, jazz violinist, known as "The Fiddling Viking" (born 1916).
- 20 – Nicolai Munch-Hansen, Danish bassist and composer (born 1977).

March

- 27 – Peter Bastian, bassoonist (born 1943).

May

- 4 - Katy Bødtger, singer (born 1932).

June

- 8 - Ivan Horn, rock guitarist (born 1949).

== See also ==
- Music of Denmark
- Denmark in the Eurovision Song Contest 2017
