= X Factor (Danish TV series) season 10 =

X Factor
- Season 10
- Hosted by: Sofie Linde Lauridsen (DR 1)
- Judges: Thomas Blachman; Mette Lindberg; Remee
- Winner: Morten Nørgaard
- Winning mentor: Remee
- Runner-up: Chili Pedersen
- Finals venue: DR Byen

Release
- Original network: DR1; DR Ultra (Ultra Factor)
- Original release: December 30, 2016 – March 31, 2017

Season chronology
- ← Previous; Season 9 Next → Season 11

X Factor is a Danish television music competition to find new singing talent. Sofie Linde Lauridsen was the host again. Thomas Blachman, Mette Lindberg and Remee returned for their respective ninth second and seventh seasons as judges. Morten Nørgaard won the competition and Remee became the winning mentor for the 4th time and won 3 seasons in a row and also for the first time in the Danish X Factor history a judge has won the show with 3 different categories.

== Judges and hosts ==
On 12 August 2016 it was announced that Sofie Linde Lauridsen would be the host again. Also, Thomas Blachman, Mette Lindberg and Remee would also return as judges.

Season 10 judges

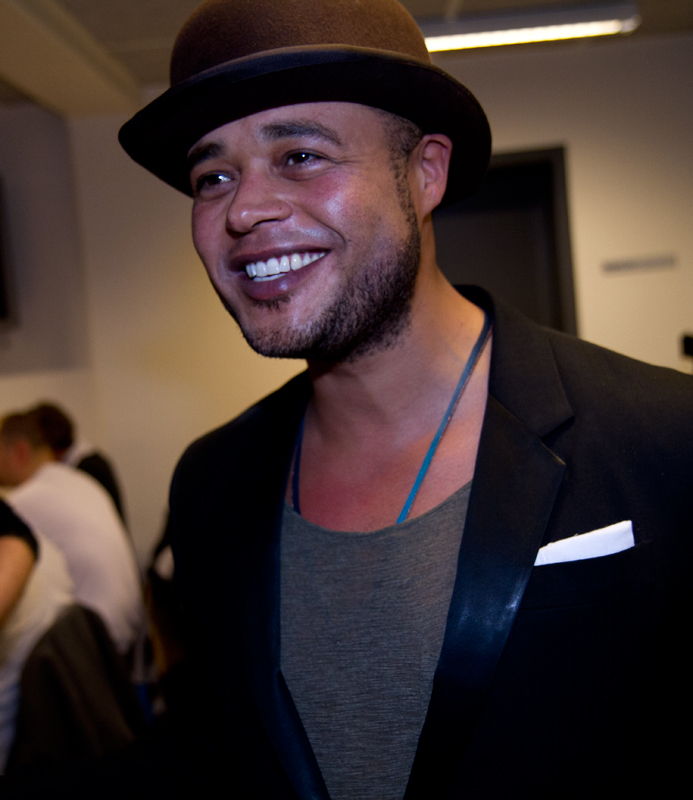
Remee

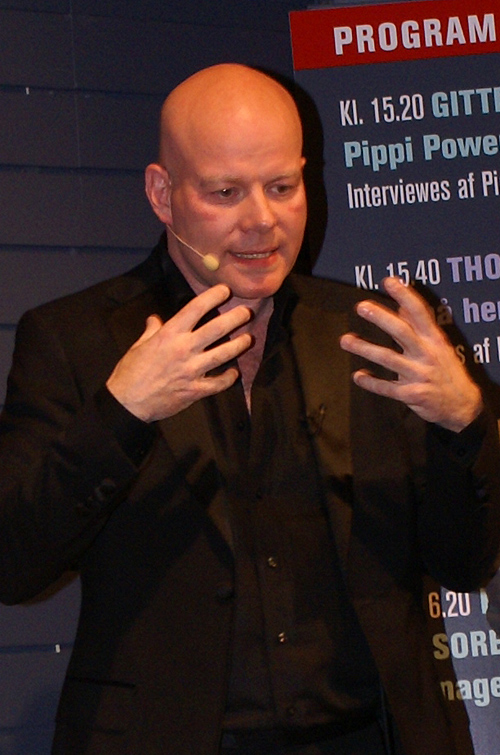
Thomas Blachman

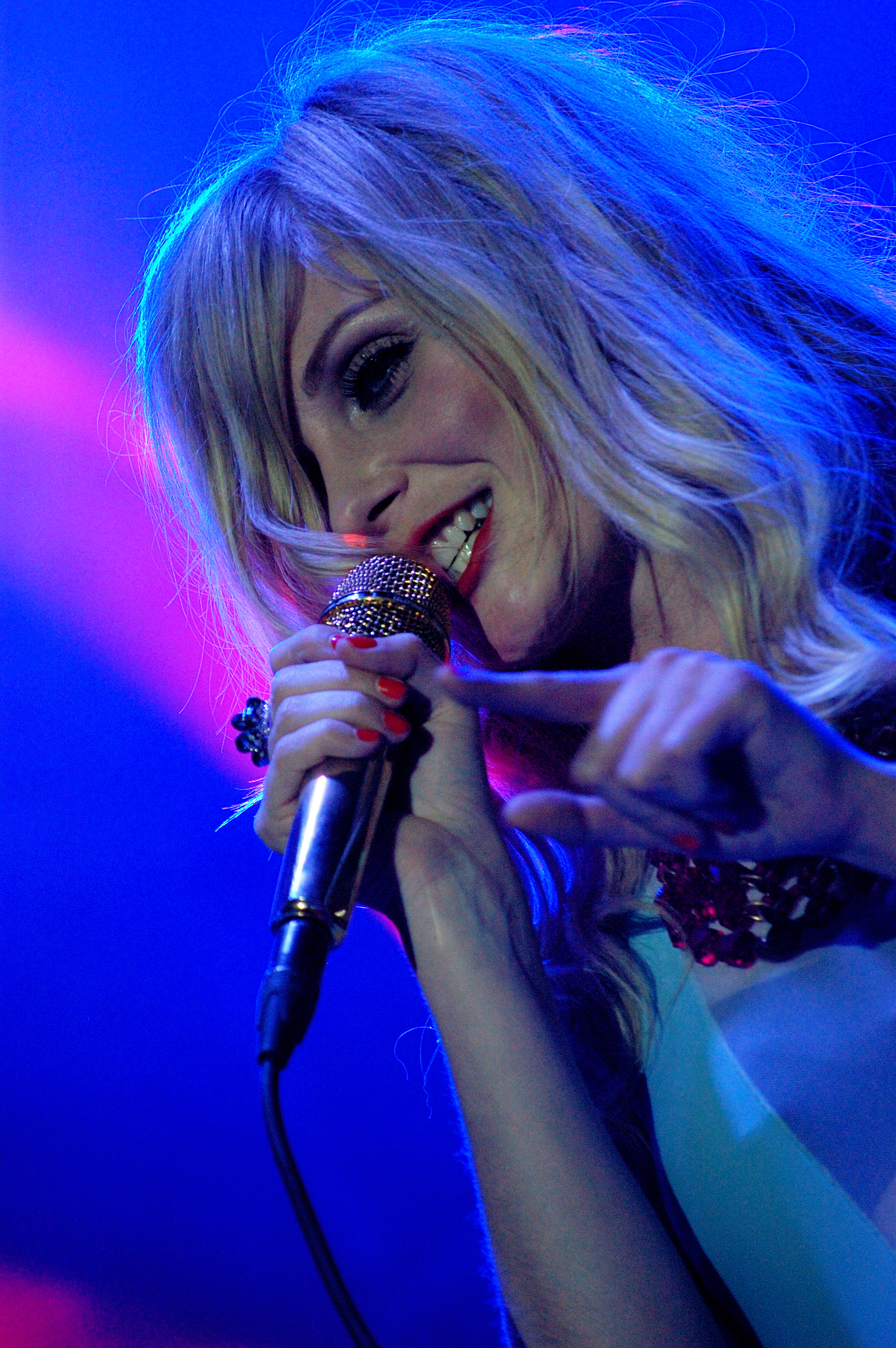
Mette Lindberg

== Selection process ==
Auditions took place in Copenhagen and Aarhus.

=== 5 Chair Challenge ===
The 5 Chair Challenge returned for season 10. Thomas Blachman mentored the 15-22s, Remee had the Over 23s and Mette Lindberg had the Groups.

The 16 successful acts were:

- 15-22s: Chili, Liv, Martin, Mia, Rosa, Saliou
- Over 23s: Anders, Libbi, Mike, Morten, Samanta
- Groups: Fyhnen Sisters, Ladies with Attitude, Lasse & Nanna, Southside, VKation

Martin was originally eliminated from the 5 Chair Challenge but Blachman later regretted his decision. Therefore, he brought Martin back in the competition and therefore, 16 acts would be competing in Bootcamp.

=== Bootcamp ===
The Bootcamp took place at Egeskov Slot.

The 7 eliminated acts were:

- 15-22s: Liv, Rosa, Saliou
- Over 23s: Anders, Libbi
- Groups: Lasse & Nanna, Southside

== Contestants ==
Key:

– Winner
– Runner-up

Act	Age(s)	Hometown	Category (mentor)	Result
Morten Nørgaard	27	Odder	Over 23s (Remee)	Winner
Chili Pedersen	16	Himmelev	15-22s (Blachman)	Runner-up
Mia Sørensen	15	Ølsted	15-22s (Blachman)	3rd place
VKation	17	Odense	Groups (Lindberg)	4th place
Samanta Gomez	28	Lyngby	Over 23s (Remee)	5th place
Martin Prytz	16	Lolland	15-22s (Blachman)	6th place
Ladies with Attitude	17-18	Greve & Gladsaxe	Groups (Lindberg)	7th place
Mike Beck	33	Nordsøen	Over 23s (Remee)	8th place
Fyhnen Sisters	18-22	Lindkund	Groups (Lindberg)	9th place

== Live shows ==
The live shows started on February 17 at DR Byen.

Colour key

–	Contestant was in the bottom two and had to sing again in the Sing-Off
–	Contestant received the fewest public votes and was immediately eliminated (no Sing-Off)
–	Contestant received the most public votes

Contestants' colour key:

– 15-22s (Blachman's contestants)
– Over 23s (Remee's contestants)
– Groups (Lindberg's contestants)

Contestant	Week 1	Week 2	Week 3	Week 4	Week 5	Week 6	Week 7	
Contestant	Week 1	Week 2	Week 3	Week 4	Week 5	Week 6	1st round	2nd round
Morten Nørgaard	1st 18,7%	2nd 16,9%	1st 20,9%	2nd 20,7%	1st 32,0%	1st 32,5%	2nd 33,8%	Winner; 52,1%
Chili Pedersen	3rd 13,4%	3rd 16,3%	2nd 17,4%	3rd 18,0%	3rd 19,9%	2nd 23,5%	1st 34,7%	Runner-Up; 47,9%
Mia Sørensen	2nd 15,1%	1st 17,9%	4th 14,6%	4th 16,5%	2nd 20,1%	3rd 23,1%	3rd 31,5%	Eliminated (Week 7)
VKation	5th 11,6%	4th 10,6%	7th 9,6%	1st 21,7%	4th 15,0%	4th 20,9%	Eliminated (Week 6)	
Samanta Gomez	6th 9,7%	5th 9,9%	3rd 15,7%	5th 13,7%	5th 12,9%	Eliminated (Week 5)		
Martin Prytz	4th 13,4%	6th 9,7%	5th 11,3%	6th 9,7%	Eliminated (Week 4)			
Ladies with Attitude	7th 7,6%	7th 9,4%	6th 10,6%	Eliminated (Week 3)				
Mike Beck	8th 6,4%	8th 9,3%	Eliminated (Week 2)					
Fyhnen Sisters	9th 4,0%	Eliminated (Week 1)						
Sing-Off	Mike Beck, Fyhnen Sisters	Ladies with Attitude, Mike Beck	Ladies with Attitude, VKation	Martin Prytz, Samanta Gomez	Samanta Gomez, VKation	The act that received the fewest public votes was automatically eliminated.		
Lindberg voted out	Mike Beck	Mike Beck	Ladies with Attitude	Martin Prytz	Samanta Gomez	The act that received the fewest public votes was automatically eliminated.		
Blachman voted out	Fyhnen Sisters	Mike Beck	Ladies with Attitude	Samanta Gomez	Samanta Gomez	The act that received the fewest public votes was automatically eliminated.		
Remee voted out	Fyhnen Sisters	Ladies with Attitude	VKation	Martin Prytz	VKation	The act that received the fewest public votes was automatically eliminated.		
Eliminated	Fyhnen Sisters; 9th	Mike Beck; 8th	Ladies with Attitude; 7th	Martin Prytz; 6th	Samanta Gomez; 5th	VKation; 4th	Mia Sørensen; 3rd	Chili Pedersen; Runner-Up
Eliminated	Fyhnen Sisters; 9th	Mike Beck; 8th	Ladies with Attitude; 7th	Martin Prytz; 6th	Samanta Gomez; 5th	VKation; 4th	Mia Sørensen; 3rd	Morten Nørgaard; Winner

=== Live show details ===
==== Week 1 (February 17) ====
- Theme: Signature

Contestants' performances on the first live show
Act	Order	Song	Result
Ladies with Attitude	1	"Say My Name"	Safe
Mia Sørensen	2	"Shock to My System"	Safe
Mike Beck	3	"Guillotine"	Bottom two
Fyhnen Sisters	4	"My Silver Lining"	Bottom two
Martin Prytz	5	"Closer"	Safe
Samanta Gomez	6	"Bare være mig selv"	Safe
VKation	7	"Angel Zoo"	Safe
Chili Pedersen	8	"Waiting Game"	Safe
Morten Nørgaard	9	"Hero"	Safe (Highest votes)
Sing-Off details
Mike Beck	1	"Can't Help But Wait"	Saved
Fyhnen Sisters	2	"Ring of Fire"	Eliminated

Judges' votes to eliminate

- Remee: Fyhnen Sisters
- Lindberg: Mike Beck
- Blachman: Fyhnen Sisters

==== Week 2 (February 24) ====
- Theme: Songs from the judges decades

Contestants' performances on the second live show
Act	Order	Song	Result
VKation	1	"Take On Me"	Safe
Samanta Gomez	2	"Wild Horses"	Safe
Martin Prytz	3	"Fever"	Safe
Morten Nørgaard	4	"How Deep Is Your Love"	Safe
Ladies with Attitude	5	"I Feel for You"	Bottom two
Chili Pedersen	6	"Train Song"	Safe
Mike Beck	7	"Moondance"	Bottom two
Mia Sørensen	8	"California Dreamin'"	Safe (Highest votes)
Sing-Off details
Ladies with Attitude	1	"Side to Side"	Saved
Mike Beck	2	"I Need a Dollar"	Eliminated

Judges' votes to eliminate

- Lindberg: Mike Beck
- Remee: Ladies with Attitude
- Blachman: Mike Beck

==== Week 3 (March 3) ====
- Theme: Break-up songs

Contestants' performances on the third live show
Act	Order	Song	Result
Mia Sørensen	1	"Shake It Out"	Safe
Morten Nørgaard	2	"This Town"	Safe (Highest votes)
Ladies with Attitude	3	"Warwick Avenue"	Bottom two
Chili Pedersen	4	"Do You Remember"	Safe
VKation	5	"Summertime Sadness"	Bottom two
Martin Prytz	6	"Fools"	Safe
Samanta Gomez	7	"One"	Safe
Sing-Off details
Ladies with Attitude	1	"Dark Horse"	Eliminated
VKation	2	"You're Not Alone"	Saved

Judges' votes to eliminate

- Blachman: Ladies with Attitude
- Remee: VKation
- Lindberg: Ladies with Attitude

==== Week 4 (March 10) ====
- Theme: Crooners and Divas accompanied by DR Big Band

Contestants' performances on the fourth live show
Act	Order	Song	Crooner/Diva	Result
Martin Prytz	1	"Suit & Tie"	Justin Timberlake	Bottom two
Samanta Gomez	2	"Judge Me"	K. Michelle	Bottom two
Mia Sørensen	3	"My Heart Belongs to Daddy"	Mary Martin	Safe
VKation	4	"Unchained Melody"	Todd Duncan	Safe (Highest votes)
Morten Nørgaard	5	"Backwards"	Lars H.U.G. and Lisa Ekdahl	Safe
Chili Pedersen	6	"Weight In Gold"	Gallant	Safe
Sing-Off details
Martin Prytz	1	"Follow You Home"		Eliminated
Samanta Gomez	2	"Smile"		Saved

Judges' votes to eliminate

- Remee: Martin Prytz
- Blachman: Samanta Gomez
- Lindberg: Martin Prytz

==== Week 5 (March 17) ====
- Theme: International hits
- Group Performance: "Rock Your Body"/"Sorry"/"...Baby One More Time"/"Thriller"/"24K Magic"/"Purple Rain" (Performed of the 5 Finalists)

Contestants' performances on the fifth live show
Act	Order	Song	Result
Chili Pedersen	1	"Video Games"	Safe
Morten Nørgaard	2	"Say You Won't Let Go"	Safe (Highest votes)
Mia Sørensen	3	"Halo"	Safe
Samanta Gomez	4	"Make Me (Cry)"	Bottom two
VKation	5	"I Feel It Coming"	Bottom two
Sing-Off details
Samanta Gomez	1	"Crazy"	Eliminated
VKation	2	"Overleve"	Saved

Judges' votes to eliminate

- Lindberg: Samanta Gomez
- Remee: VKation
- Blachman: Samanta Gomez

==== Week 6: Semi-final (24 March) ====
- Theme: Anniversary Song (songs previously performed by previous finalists), Viewers Choice
- Musical Guest: KAPUTU ("Hvor du går")

Choices for Viewers choice song week
Act	Song choices	Result	Public Vote
Chili Pedersen	"Porcelain"	Not chosen	22,72%
Chili Pedersen	"Bad Blood"	Not chosen	38,62%
Chili Pedersen	"Higher"	Chosen	38,66%
Mia Sørensen
Mia Sørensen	"Running with the Wolves"	Chosen	48,14%
Mia Sørensen	"Stronger Than Ever"	Not chosen	35,90%
Mia Sørensen	"Sippy Cup"	Not chosen	15,96%
Morten Nørgaard	"Hey There Delilah"	Not chosen	26,74%
Morten Nørgaard	"Dancing On My Own"	Chosen	56,51%
Morten Nørgaard	"Arthur's Theme"	Not chosen	16,75%
VKation
VKation	"Sorry"	Not chosen	18,65%
VKation	"All My Love"	Not chosen	33,89%
VKation	"Final Song"	Chosen	47,46%

Contestants' performances on the sixth live show
Act	Order	First song	Previous finalist	Order	Second song	Result
Morten Nørgaard	1	"Mad World"	Thomas Ring	5	"Dancing On My Own"	Safe (Highest votes)
Chili Pedersen	2	"DJ, Ease My Mind"	Nicoline Simone & Jean Michel	6	"Higher"	Safe
VKation	3	"Stay with Me"	Jógvan	7	"Final Song"	Eliminated
Mia Sørensen	4	"Oh Love"	Amanda	8	"Running with the Wolves"	Safe

The semi-final did not feature a Sing-Off and instead the act with the fewest public votes, VKation, was automatically eliminated.

==== Week 7: Final (31 March) ====
- Theme: Free Choice, Dallas Austin's Choice, Winner's single
- Musical guests: Gulddreng ("Utro"), Ed Sheeran ("Castle on the Hill") & ("Shape of You")
- Group Performances: "Fem Fine Frøkner" (Gabrielle; Performed of X Factor 2017 Finalists and Sofie Linde Lauridsen); "Ked af det" (Performed of Gulddreng and Auditionees)

Contestants' performances on the seventh live show
Act	Order	Free Choice Song	Order	Dallas Austin's Choice	Order	Winner's single	Result
Mia Sørensen	1	"Issues"	4	"Send My Love (To Your New Lover)"	N/A	N/A (Already eliminated)	3rd Place
Morten Nørgaard	2	"Runnin' (Lose It All)"	5	"Pompeii"	8	"The Underdog"	Winner
Chili Pedersen	3	"Feel Like Me"	6	"Dangerous Woman"	7	"Plated Gold"	Runner-up
