= Around the Bend (disambiguation) =

Around the Bend is a 2004 film

Around the Bend may also refer to:

- Around the Bend (album), by Randy Travis, 2008.
- "Around the Bend", song by The Asteroids Galaxy Tour from Fruit, 2009.
- "Around the Bend", song by Pearl Jam from No Code, 1996
- "Around the Bend", song by Martha Wainwright from Goodnight City, 2016.
- "Around the Bend", a song by Moka Only from Clap Trap, 2018 reissue
- "Around the Bend", etude about pitch bending for oboe solo by Juan María Solare, 2022.
