= X Factor (Danish TV series) season 9 =

X Factor
- Season 9
- Hosted by: Sofie Linde Lauridsen (DR 1)
- Judges: Thomas Blachman; Mette Lindberg; Remee
- Winner: Embrace
- Winning mentor: Remee
- Runner-up: Reem Hamze
- Finals venue: DR Byen

Release
- Original network: DR1; DR Ultra (Ultra Factor)
- Original release: January 8 – April 1, 2016

Season chronology
- ← Previous; Season 8 Next → Season 10

X Factor is a Danish television music competition to find new singing talent. In season 9, Sofie Linde Lauridsen replaced Eva Harlou as host. Thomas Blachman and Remee returned for their respective eighth and sixth seasons as judges, joined by newcomer Mette Lindberg. Lina Rafn, after four seasons as a judge, did not return. The winners were Embrace and Remee became the winning mentor for the third time and for the first time in the Danish X Factor history a judge has won two years in a row.

== Judges and hosts ==
Season 9 judges

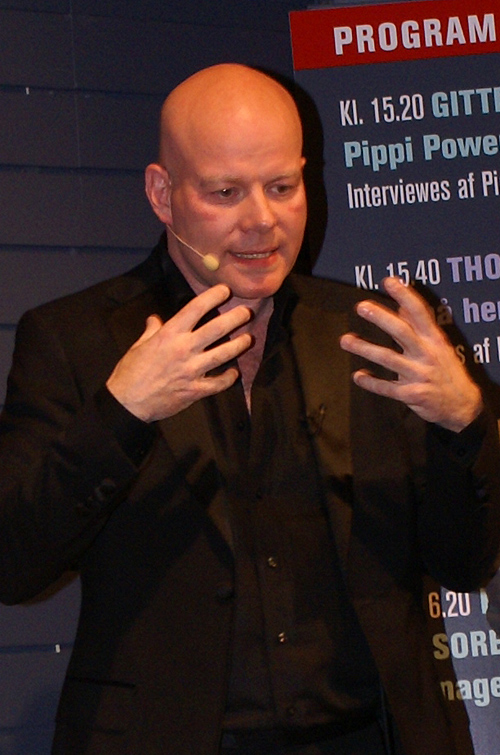
Thomas Blachman

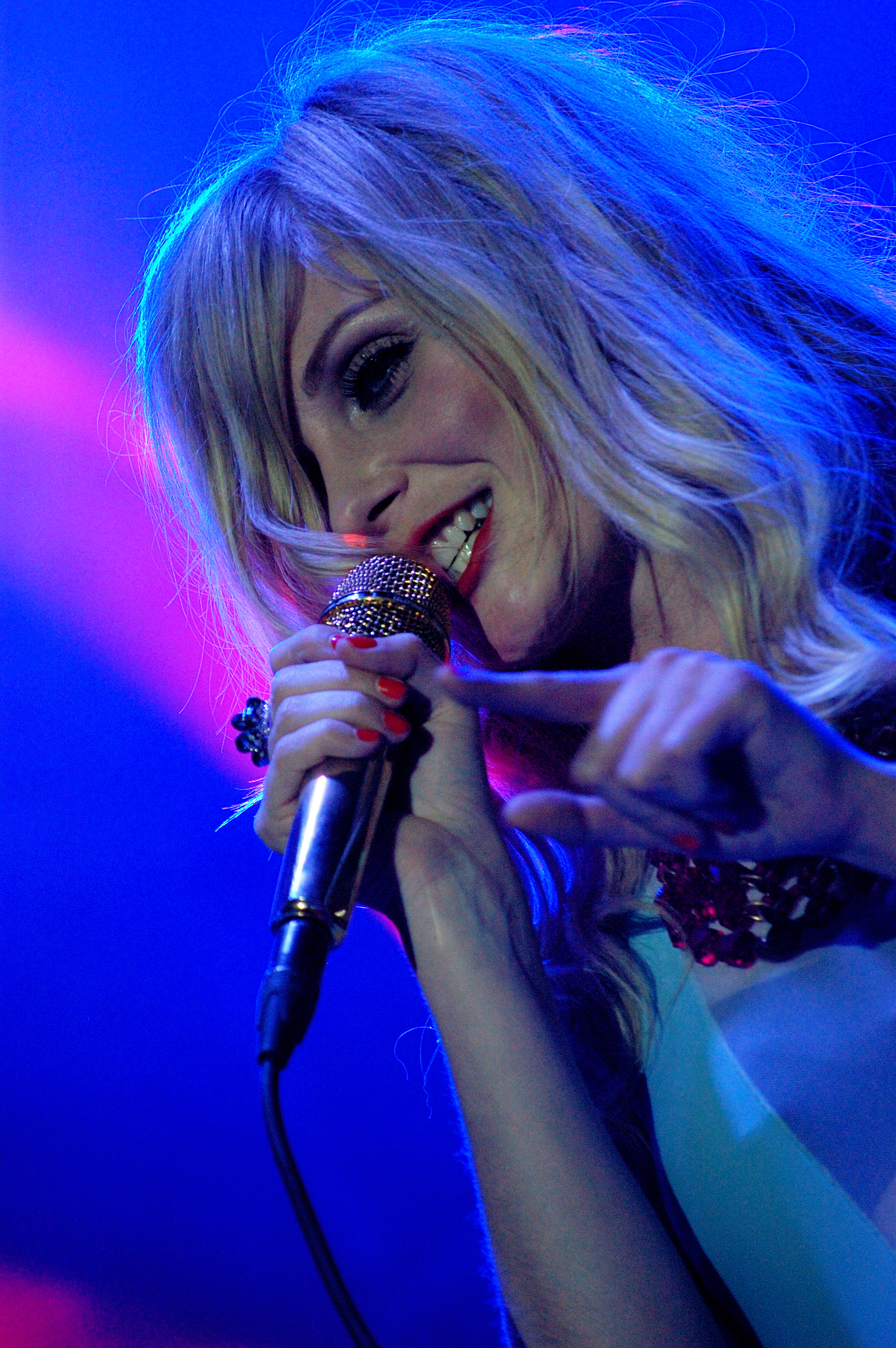
Mette Lindberg

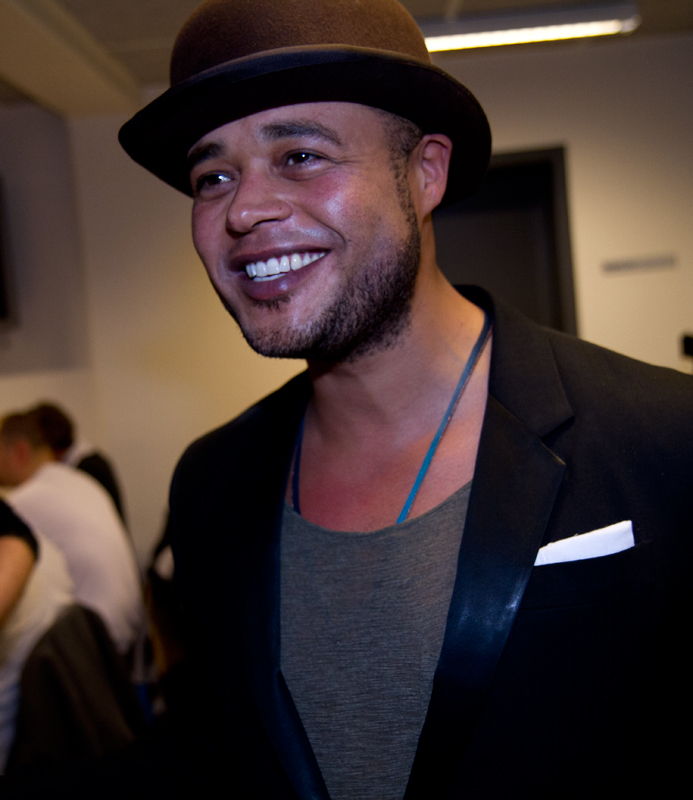
Remee

On March 20, 2015, it was reported that Lina Rafn was considering leaving X Factor. Five days later, it was reported that Rafn would be leaving the show. At the final of season 8 on March 27, Rafn said in an interview that she did not know if she would continue as a judge. Thomas Blachman said it was maybe time for three new judges. On June 22, Rafn said that she was in doubt about returning to X Factor because she also wanted to focus on her own career. On June 26, Eva Harlou announced that she would not be returning as host for season 9. On June 29, it was announced that Sofie Linde Lauridsen would replace Harlou as host. On 14 July, it was reported that Rafn had left the show. The following day, it was announced that Rafn would not be returning as a judge for season 9. On 10 August, it was announced that the judges would be announced on 12 August.

== Selection process ==
=== Auditions ===
Auditions took place in Copenhagen and Aarhus.

=== 5 Chair Challenge ===
The 5 Chair Challenge was back for the ninth season. Mette Lindberg mentored the 15-22s, Thomas Blachman has the Over 23s and Remee has the Groups.

The 15 successful acts were:

- 15-22s: Alex, Anna, Elena, Mads Christian, Reem
- Over 23s: Andrew, Cirke, Heidi, Jacob, Sarah
- Groups: 3 Levels, Clifforth & Hein, The Competition, Embrace, Katinka & Sigrid

=== Bootcamp ===
Remee, Lindberg and Blachman took their contestants to the island of Fejø. Each judge had their own base. Lindberg took the 15-22s to an old mill, Blachman took the Over 23s to a nursing home, and Remee took the Groups to a bath yard.

The 6 eliminated acts were:

- 15-22s: Anna, Elena
- Over 23s: Cirke, Heidi
- Groups: 3 Levels, Katinka & Sigrid

=== Changes ===
For the first time in the Danish X Factor, the two contestants in the bottom two would not sing the same song they sang earlier in the live show, they would pick their own song.

== Contestants ==
Key:

– Winner
– Runner-up

Act	Age(s)	Hometown	Category (mentor)	Result
Embrace	19-22	Holstebro	Groups (Remee)	Winner
Reem Hamze	17	Lyngby	15-22s (Lindberg)	Runner-up
Alex Benson	22	Nærum	15-22s (Lindberg)	3rd place
Andrew Murray	52	Helsingør	Over 23s (Blachman)	4th place
Clifforth & Hein	43-47	Give & Fredericia	Groups (Remee)	5th place
Mads Christian	16	Copenhagen	15-22s (Lindberg)	6th place
The Competition	21	Sindal & Aalborg	Groups (Remee)	7th place
Sarah Glerup	30	Maribo	Over 23s (Blachman)	8th place
Jacob Bering	23	Skanderborg	Over 23s (Blachman)	9th place

== Live shows ==
The live shows started on February 19, 2016 at DR Byen.

Colour key

–	Contestant was in the bottom two and had to sing again in the Sing-Off
–	Contestant received the fewest public votes and was immediately eliminated (no Sing-Off)
–	Contestant received the most public votes

Contestants' colour key:

– 15-22s (Lindberg's contestants)
– Over 23s (Blachman's contestants)
– Groups (Remee's contestants)

Contestant	Week 1	Week 2	Week 3	Week 4	Week 5	Week 6	Week 7	
Contestant	Week 1	Week 2	Week 3	Week 4	Week 5	Week 6	1st round	2nd round
Embrace	3rd 14.10%	1st 22.64%	1st 22.68%	2nd 22.08%	1st 23.45%	1st 29.68%	1st 41.25%	Winners; 59.72%
Reem Hamze	1st 26.70%	2nd 18.12%	3rd 15.76%	1st 24.57%	3rd 22.98%	3rd 24.81%	2nd 39.45%	Runner-Up; 40.28%
Alex Benson	5th 7.28%	4th 12.79%	5th 11.39%	5th 12.70%	4th 20.36%	2nd 27.46%	3rd 19.30%	Eliminated (Week 7)
Andrew Murray	2nd 15.39%	5th 9.93%	2nd 16.88%	3rd 16.66%	2nd 23.27%	4th 18.06%	Eliminated (Week 6)	
Clifforth & Hein	4th 12.09%	3rd 16.23%	4th 13.63%	4th 13.24%	5th 9.94%	Eliminated (Week 5)		
Mads Christian	6th 6.92%	6th 9.69%	6th 10.76%	6th 10.75%	Eliminated (Week 4)			
The Competition	7th 6.91%	7th 5.72%	7th 8.91%	Eliminated (Week 3)				
Sarah Glerup	8th 6.30%	8th 4.88%	Eliminated (Week 2)					
Jacob Bering	9th 4.30%	Eliminated (Week 1)						
Sing-Off	Jacob Bering, Sarah Glerup	The Competition, Sarah Glerup	The Competition, Mads Christian	Alex Benson, Mads Christian	Clifforth & Hein, Alex Benson	The act that received the fewest public votes was automatically eliminated.		
Remee voted out	Jacob Bering	Sarah Glerup	Mads Christian	Mads Christian	Alex Benson	The act that received the fewest public votes was automatically eliminated.		
Lindberg voted out	Sarah Glerup	Sarah Glerup	The Competition	—	Clifforth & Hein	The act that received the fewest public votes was automatically eliminated.		
Blachman voted out	Jacob Bering	The Competition	The Competition	Mads Christian	Clifforth & Hein	The act that received the fewest public votes was automatically eliminated.		
Eliminated	Jacob Bering; 9th	Sarah Glerup; 8th	The Competition; 7th	Mads Christian; 6th	Clifforth & Hein; 5th	Andrew Murray; 4th	Alex Benson; 3rd	Reem Hamze; Runner-Up
Eliminated	Jacob Bering; 9th	Sarah Glerup; 8th	The Competition; 7th	Mads Christian; 6th	Clifforth & Hein; 5th	Andrew Murray; 4th	Alex Benson; 3rd	Embrace; Winner

=== Live show details ===
==== Week 1 (February 19) ====
- Theme: Signature

Contestants' performances on the first live show
Act	Order	Song	Result
Embrace	1	"You Don't Own Me"	Safe
Jacob Bering	2	"Hotline Bling"	Bottom two
Alex Benson	3	"Somebody to Love Me"	Safe
Clifforth & Hein	4	"Your Love Will Blow Me Away When My Heart Aches"	Safe
Sarah Glerup	5	"Strict Machine"	Bottom two
Mads Christian	6	"Locked Out of Heaven"	Safe
The Competition	7	"Girls & Boys"	Safe
Reem Hamze	8	"Stay"	Safe (Highest votes)
Andrew Murray	9	"Tick Tick Boom"	Safe
Sing-Off details
Jacob Bering	1	"I Took a Pill in Ibiza"	Eliminated
Sarah Glerup	2	"Time"	Saved

Judges' votes to eliminate

- Lindberg: Sarah Glerup
- Remee: Jacob Bering
- Blachman: Jacob Bering

==== Week 2 (February 26) ====
- Theme: Scandinavian songs
- Musical guest: Julie Bergan ("All Hours")

Contestants' performances on the second live show
Act	Order	Song	Result
The Competition	1	"Mamma Mia"	Bottom two
Reem Hamze	2	"Lost in the Girl"	Safe
Andrew Murray	3	"Get the Fuck Out of My Mind"	Safe
Clifforth & Hein	4	"Hjem"	Safe
Alex Benson	5	"Some Die Young"	Safe
Embrace	6	"Frit Land"	Safe (Highest votes)
Sarah Glerup	7	"Vi to er smeltet sammen"	Bottom two
Mads Christian	8	"Uopnåelig"	Safe
Sing-Off details
The Competition	1	"Rollercoaster"	Saved
Sarah Glerup	2	"Enjoy the Silence"	Eliminated

Judges' votes to eliminate

- Remee: Sarah Glerup
- Blachman: The Competition
- Lindberg: Sarah Glerup

==== Week 3 (March 4) ====
- Theme: Songs from the contestant's birthyears

Contestants' performances on the third live show
Act	Order	Song	Result
Reem Hamze	1	"No Scrubs"	Safe
Clifforth & Hein	2	"Light My Fire"	Safe
Alex Benson	3	"Missing"	Safe
The Competition	4	"Basket Case"	Bottom two
Mads Christian	5	"Trouble"	Bottom two
Andrew Murray	6	"El Toro"	Safe
Embrace	7	"Ready or Not"	Safe (Highest votes)
Sing-Off details
The Competition	1	"Mr. Jones"	Eliminated
Mads Christian	2	"Life Is Worth Living"	Saved

Judges' votes to eliminate

- Lindberg: The Competition
- Remee: Mads Christian
- Blachman: The Competition

==== Week 4 (March 11) ====
- Theme: Radiohits (songs that have been in the top 10 on the Danish airplay chart)

Contestants' performances on the fourth live show
Act	Order	Song	Result
Alex Benson	1	"Hold Back the River"	Bottom two
Embrace	2	"Ain't Nobody (Loves Me Better)"	Safe
Mads Christian	3	"Stitches"	Bottom two
Andrew Murray	4	"Galgary"	Safe
Clifforth & Hein	5	"Free"	Safe
Reem Hamze	6	"Hello"	Safe (Highest votes)
Sing-Off details
Alex Benson	1	"The Pieces Don't Fit Anymore"	Saved
Mads Christian	2	"It Will Rain"	Eliminated

Judges' votes to eliminate

- Lindberg: Refused to choose between two of her contestants
- Blachman: Mads Christian
- Remee: Mads Christian

==== Week 5 (March 18) ====
- Theme: David Bowie songs
- Musical guest: Emilie Esther ("Inescapable")
- Group Performance: "Let's Dance"

Contestants' performances on the fifth live show
Act	Order	Song	Result
Clifforth & Hein	1	"The Man Who Sold the World"	Bottom two
Andrew Murray	2	"Life On Mars?"	Safe
Reem Hamze	3	"Quicksand"	Safe
Embrace	4	"Absolute Beginners"	Safe (Highest votes)
Alex Benson	5	"Space Oddity"	Bottom two
Sing-Off details
Clifforth & Hein	1	"The Drugs Don't Work"	Eliminated
Alex Benson	2	"Rewind"	Saved

Judges' votes to eliminate

- Lindberg: Clifforth & Hein
- Remee: Alex Benson
- Blachman: Clifforth & Hein

==== Week 6: Semi-final (25 March) ====
- Theme: Viewers choice; Audition songs
- Musical guest: Citybois ("Purple light") and ("Hot body")

Contestants' performances on the sixth live show
Act	Order	First song	Order	Second song	Result
Andrew Murray	1	"School's Out"	5	"All Right Now"	Eliminated
Reem Hamze	2	"Born to Die"	6	"Nirvana"	Safe
Embrace	3	"Fast Car"	8	How to Be a Heartbreaker"	Safe (Highest votes)
Alex Benson	4	"Gravity"	7	"Last Request"	Safe

The semi-final did not feature a Sing-Off and instead the act with the fewest public votes, Andrew Murray, was automatically eliminated.

==== Week 7: Final (1 April) ====
- Theme: Free Choice; Duet with Musical Guests; winner's single
- Musical guest: Phlake ("Angel Zoo") and ("Pregnant")
- Group Performances: "Never Forget You" (MNEK and Zara Larsson; Performed of Alex Benson, Reem Hamze, and Embrace); "Thank You for the Music"/"Watch Me (Whip/Nae Nae)" (ABBA/Silentó); (auditionees); "History" (One Direction) (Performed of X Factor 2016 contestants)

Contestants' performances on the seventh live show
Act	Order	Free Choice Song	Order	Duet with Musical guests (Musical Guests)	Order	Winner's single	Result
Alex Benson	1	"Crazy"	4	"Painkillers" and "Tunnel Vision" (with Patrick Dorgan and Mads Langer)	N/A	N/A (Already eliminated)	3rd Place
Embrace	2	"Like I'm Gonna Lose You"	5	"Shackled Up" and "Casual" (with Alex Vargas and Scarlet Pleasure)	8	"Commitment Issues"	Winner
Reem Hamze	3	"Where Are Ü Now"	6	"Golden" and "I Won't Let You Down" (with Brandon Beal and Christopher)	7	"All That I Want'"	Runner-up
