= X Factor (Danish TV series) season 8 =

X Factor
- Season 8
- Hosted by: Eva Harlou
- Judges: Thomas Blachman; Lina Rafn; Remee
- Winner: Emilie Esther
- Winning mentor: Remee
- Runner-up: Jógvan
- Finals venue: Jyske Bank Boxen

Release
- Original network: DR1
- Original release: 2 January – 27 March 2015

Season chronology
- ← Previous; Season 7 Next → Season 9

X Factor is a Danish television music competition to find new singing talent. The eighth season premiered on 2 January 2015 and ended on 27 March on DR1. Eva Harlou returned as host for her second season. Thomas Blachman, Remee and Lina Rafn returned as judges for their respective seventh, fifth and fourth seasons.

== Judges and hosts ==
Season 8 judges

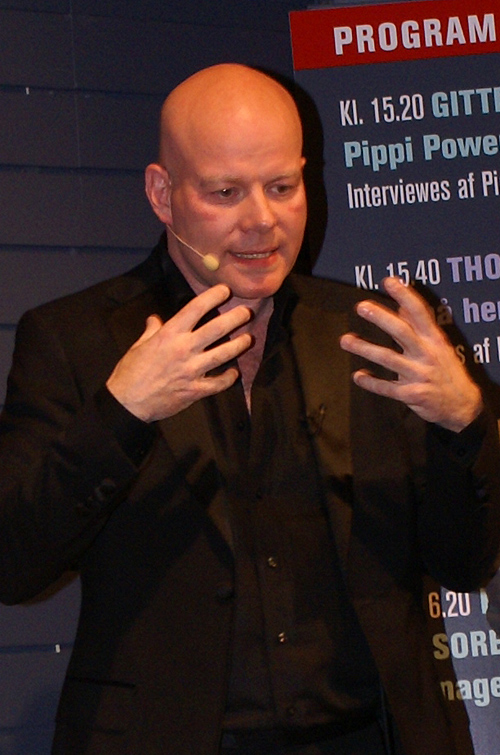
Thomas Blachman

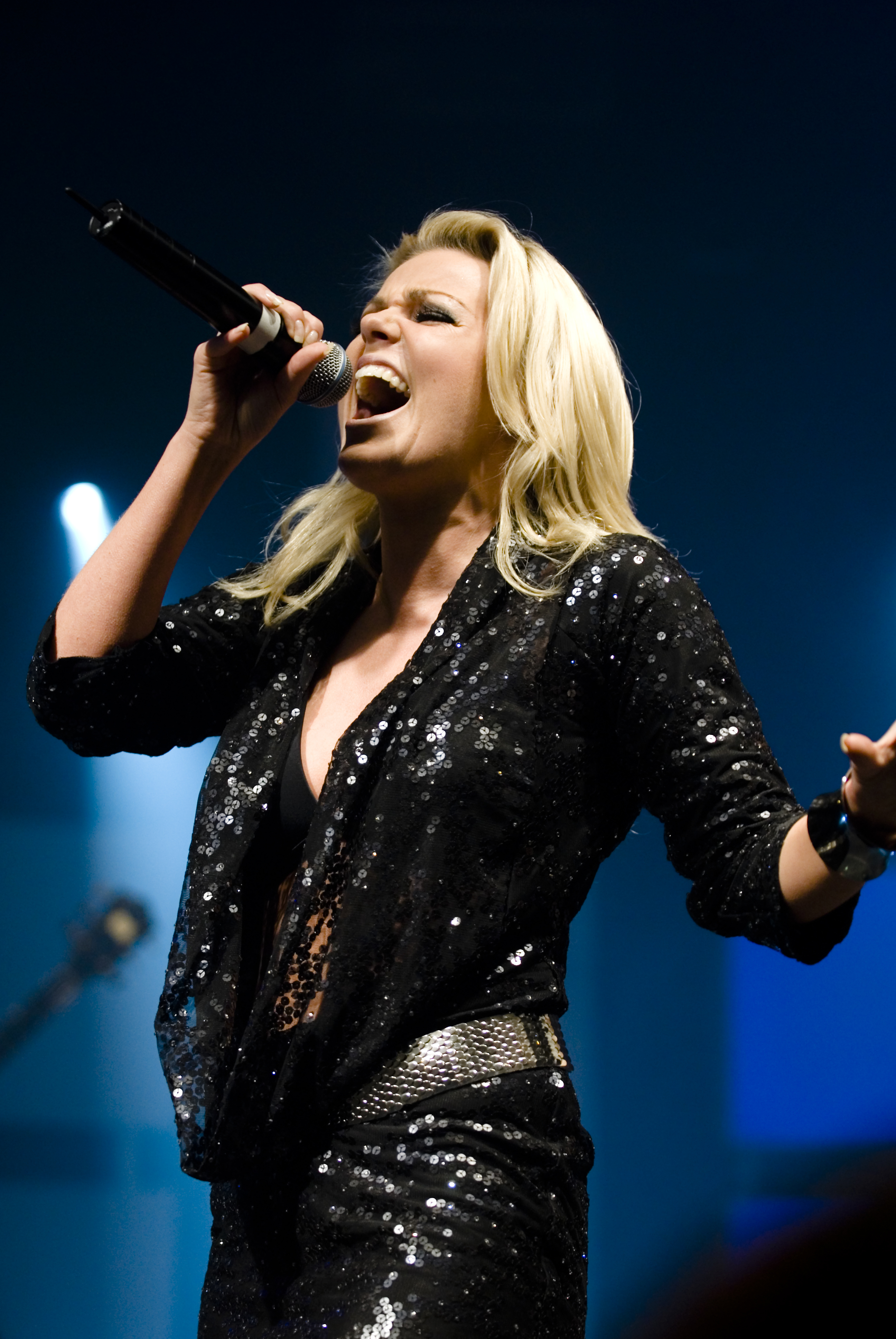
Lina Rafn

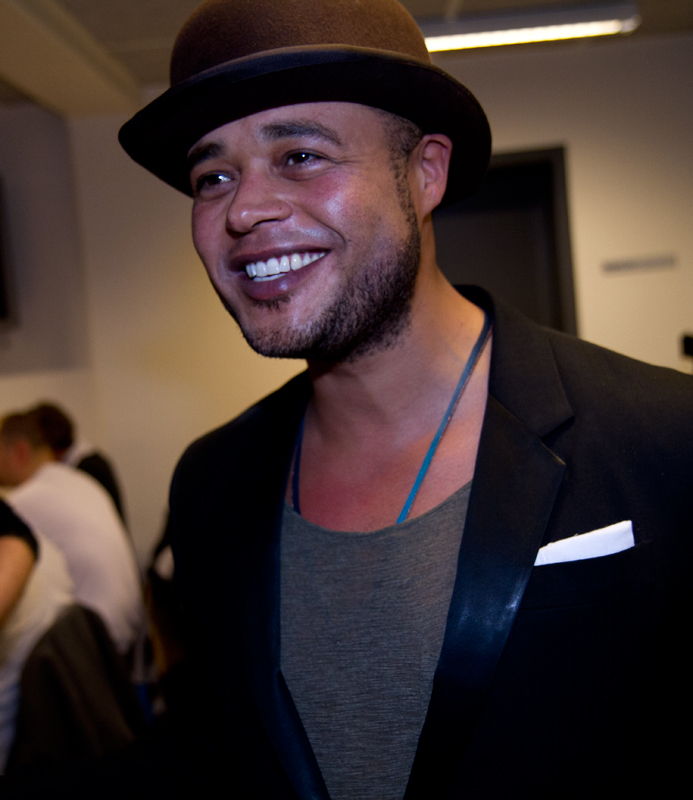
Remee

On 29 March 2014 Remee announced that he would not be returning as a judge for season 8. On 11 August it was announced that Eva Harlou would be returning as host. On 18 August it was announced that Thomas Blachman, Lina Rafn and Remee would all be returning as judges for season 8.

== Selection process ==
=== Auditions ===
Auditions took place in Copenhagen and Aarhus.

=== 5 Chair Challenge ===
For the eighth season, superbootcamp was replaced by 5 Chair Challenge. 5 Chair Challenge was filmed from 28 to 29 October 2014. The 14-22s category was changed to the 15-22s. Remee received the 15-22s category, Rafn received the Over 23s and Blachman received the Groups. Before the Groups were due to perform, Blachman removed two of the chairs.

The 15 successful acts were:

- 15-22s: Baraa, Daniel, Emilie, Johannes, Tannaz
- Over 23s: Jògvan, Nanni, Peter, Rene, Sophia
- Groups: The CCS, Citybois, Finn & Rie, Ivarsson, Bang & Neumann, Second Venue

=== Bootcamp ===
Remee took the 15-22s to a military base; Rafn took the Over 23s to Horsens Statsfængsel; and Blachman took the Groups to a school. For the first time since the show's inception in 2008, the judges had no assistants.

The 6 eliminated acts were:

- 15-22s: Daniel, Johannes
- Over 23s: Peter, Rene
- Groups: The CCS, Second Venue

== Contestants ==
Key:

– Winner
– Runner-up

Act	Age(s)	Hometown	Category (mentor)	Result
Emilie Esther	15	Aalborg	15-22s (Remee)	Winner
Jógvan Joensen	25	Faroe Islands	Over 23s (Rafn)	Runner-up
Ivarsson, Bang & Neumann	16-21	Frederiksberg, Holbæk & Holte	Groups (Blachman)	3rd place
Citybois	15-16	Gentofte	Groups (Blachman)	4th place
Baraa Qadoura	15	Gellerup	15-22s (Remee)	5th place
Tannaz Hakami	16	Odense	15-22s (Remee)	6th place
Sophia Nohr	25	Frederiksberg	Over 23s (Rafn)	7th place
Finn & Rie	56-60	Tølløse & Slagelse	Groups (Blachman)	8th place
Nanni Klitte	26	Randers	Over 23s (Rafn)	9th place

== Live shows ==
The live shows started on 13 February 2015 at DR Byen. The final will be held at Jyske Bank Boxen in Herning on 27 March.

Colour key

–	Contestant was in the bottom two and had to sing again in the final showdown
–	Contestant received the fewest public votes and was immediately eliminated (no final showdown)
–	Contestant received the most public votes

Contestants' colour key:

– Over 23s (Rafn's contestants)
– 15-22s (Remee's contestants)
– Groups (Blachman's contestants)

Contestant	Week 1	Week 2	Week 3	Week 4	Week 5	Week 6	Week 7	
Contestant	Week 1	Week 2	Week 3	Week 4	Week 5	Week 6	1st round	2nd round
Emilie Esther	2nd 13.7%	3rd 14.7%	1st 18.8%	1st 20.8%	1st 24.1%	1st 32.7%	1st 51.2%	Winner; 59.8%
Jógvan Joensen	8th 7.3%	2nd 15.6%	4th 14.4%	4th 16.3%	2nd 20.8%	2nd 25.6%	2nd 27.4%	Runner-Up; 40.2%
Ivarsson, Bang & Neumann	4th 13.2%	5th 11.9%	3rd 15.1%	2nd 17.2%	4th 18.5%	3rd 22.2%	3rd 21.4%	Eliminated (Week 7)
Citybois	5th 12.4%	1st 16.4%	2nd 15.7%	3rd 16.7%	3rd 18.6%	4th 19.5%	Eliminated (Week 6)	
Baraa Qadoura	1st 14.6%	6th 11.2%	7th 9.5%	6th 14,4%	5th 18.0%	Eliminated (Week 5)		
Tannaz Hakami	6th 11,9%	7th 10,0%	5th 13,9%	5th 14.6%	Eliminated (Week 4)			
Sophia Nohr	3rd 13,3%	4th 12,4%	6th 12,6%	Eliminated (Week 3)				
Finn & Rie	7th 7.8%	8th 7.3%	Eliminated (Week 2)					
Nanni Klitte	9th 6.4%	Eliminated (Week 1)						
Final Showdown	Jógvan, Nanni	Finn & Rie, Tannaz Hakami	Baraa Qadoura, Sophia	Baraa Qadoura, Tannaz Hakami	Ivarsson, Bang & Neumann; Baraa Qadoura	The act that received the fewest public votes was automatically eliminated.		
Remee voted out	Nanni Klitte	Finn & Rie	Sophia Nohr	Tannaz Hakami	Ivarsson, Bang & Neumann	The act that received the fewest public votes was automatically eliminated.		
Rafn voted out	Nanni Klitte	Finn & Rie	Baraa Qadoura	Tannaz Hakami	Baraa Qadoura	The act that received the fewest public votes was automatically eliminated.		
Blachman voted out	Jógvan	Tannaz Hakami	Sophia Nohr	-	Baraa Qadoura	The act that received the fewest public votes was automatically eliminated.		
Eliminated	Nanni Klitte; 9th	Finn & Rie; 8th	Sophia; 7th	Tannaz Hakami; 6th	Baraa Qadoura; 5th	Citybois; 4th	Ivarsson, Bang & Neumann; 3rd	Jógvan Joensen; Runner-Up
Eliminated	Nanni Klitte; 9th	Finn & Rie; 8th	Sophia; 7th	Tannaz Hakami; 6th	Baraa Qadoura; 5th	Citybois; 4th	Ivarsson, Bang & Neumann; 3rd	Emilie Esther; Winner

=== Live show details ===
==== Week 1 (13 February) ====
- Theme: Signature

Contestants' performances on the first live show
Act	Order	Song	Result
Tannaz Hakami	1	"Take Me to Church"	Safe
Jógvan Joensen	2	"Forget Her"	Bottom two
Finn & Rie	3	"(That's How You Sing) Amazing Grace"	Safe
Emilie Esther	4	"We Are Young"	Safe
Ivarsson, Bang & Neumann	5	"White Winter Hymnal"	Safe
Nanni Klitte	6	"Kører for dig"	Eliminated
Citybois	7	"Former"	Safe
Sophia Nohr	8	"Ghost"	Safe
Baraa Qadoura	9	"We Are Here"	Safe (Highest votes)

Judges' votes to eliminate

- Blachman: Jógvan
- Remee: Nanni Klitte
- Rafn: Nanni Klitte – felt the competition was not the right place for her

==== Week 2 (20 February) ====
- Theme: Grammy nominated hits

Contestants' performances on the second live show
Act	Order	Song	Result
Sophia Nohr	1	"American Pie"	Safe
Emilie Esther	2	"Chandelier"	Safe
Finn & Rie	3	"Harvest Moon"	Eliminated
Baraa Qadoura	4	"Brave"	Safe
Ivarsson, Bang & Neumann	5	"Holocene"	Safe
Tannaz Hakami	6	"I Want to Know What Love Is"	Bottom two
Jógvan Joensen	7	"Stay with Me"	Safe
Citybois	8	"Maniac"	Safe (Highest votes)

Judges' votes to eliminate

- Remee: Finn & Rie – backed his own act, Tannaz Hakami
- Blachman: Tannaz Hakami – backed his own act, Finn & Rie
- Rafn: Finn & Rie – thought Hakami would get more out of a recording contract

==== Week 3 (27 February) ====
- Theme: Contemporary hits
- Musical guests: Heidi Svelmøe Herløw, Lucas, Asian Senstation, Alien Beat Club, Thomas Ring Petersen, Babou, Tandberg & Østenby, Jean Michel, Karoline, Zaina, Anthony Jasmin, Lucy Mardou and Henriette Haubjerg ("A Sky Full of Stars")

Contestants' performances on the third live show
Act	Order	Song	Result
Baraa Qadoura	1	"When Love Takes Over"	Bottom two
Sophia Nohr	2	"Prototypical"	Eliminated
Citybois	3	"The Strip"	Safe
Tannaz Hakami	4	"Back to Black"	Safe
Ivarsson, Bang & Neumann	5	"Miles and Miles"	Safe
Emilie Esther	6	"Wild Eyes"/"Pompeii"	Safe (Highest votes)
Jógvan Joensen	7	"Radioactive"	Safe

Judges' votes to eliminate

- Remee: Sophia Nohr – backed his own act, Baraa Qadoura
- Rafn: Baraa Qadoura – backed her own act, Sophia
- Blachman: Sophia Nohr

==== Week 4 (6 March) ====
- Theme: Danish hits

Contestants' performances on the fourth live show
Act	Order	Song	Result
Citybois	1	"Lørdag aften"	Safe
Emilie Esther	2	"Glimpse of a Time"	Safe (Highest votes)
Jógvan Joensen	3	"Når tiden går baglæns"	Safe
Baraa Qadoura	4	"Better Than Yourself (Criminal Mind Pt. 2)"/"Faded"	Bottom two
Ivarsson, Bang & Neumann	5	"Comforting Sounds"	Safe
Tannaz Hakami	6	"I Danmark er jeg født"	Eliminated

Judges' votes to eliminate

- Rafn: Tannaz Hakami: decided to go with the talent instead of the voice
- Blachman: decided to let Remee decide between his two acts
- Remee: Tannaz Hakami

==== Week 5 (13 March) ====
- Theme: Songs from Movies (accompanied by DR Bigband)
- Group Performance: "Uptown Funk"

Contestants' performances on the fifth live show
Act	Order	Song	Movie	Result
Ivarsson, Bang & Neumann	1	"Yellow Flicker Beat"	The Hunger Games: Mockingjay – Part 1	Bottom two
Baraa Qadoura	2	"Don't Let Go (Love)"	Set It Off	Eliminated
Citybois	3	"Earned It"	Fifty Shades of Grey	Safe
Jógvan Joensen	4	"Creep"	Happily Ever After	Safe
Emilie Esther	5	"Poker Face"	N/A	Safe (Highest votes)

Judges' votes to eliminate

- Blachman: Baraa Qadoura – backed his own act, Ivarsson, Bang & Neumann, and also said to Baraa Qadoura that he never thought a contestant had been sent through after three times in the bottom two
- Remee: Ivarsson, Bang & Neumann – backed his own act, Baraa Qadoura
- Rafn: Baraa Qadoura – because it was Qadoura's third time in the bottom two

==== Week 6: Semi-final (20 March) ====
- Theme: Viewers choice; Judges choice
- Musical guest: Basim ("Picture in a frame") and ("I Believe I Can Fly")

Contestants' performances on the sixth live show
Act	Order	First song	Order	Second song	Result
Emilie Esther	1	"One Last Time"/"Love Me like You Do"	5	"FourFiveSeconds"	Safe (Highest votes)
Ivarsson, Bang & Neumann	2	"The Balcony"	6	"Empty Room"	Safe
Jógvan Joensen	3	"Use Somebody"	7	"Josephine"	Safe
Citybois	4	"Kongens Have"	8	"Belong to the World"	Eliminated

The semi-final did not feature a final showdown and instead the act with the fewest public votes, Citybois, was automatically eliminated.

==== Week 7: Final (27 March) ====
- Theme: Free Choice; Duet with Musical Guests; winner's single
- Musical guests: Ulige Numre ("Halvnøgen"); Julias Moon ("Palace"); Stine Bramsen ("The Day You Leave Me"); OMI ("Cheerleader")
- Group Performances: "Break Free" (Ariana Grande featuring Zedd; Performed of Ivarsson, Bang & Neumann, Emilie Esther, and Jógvan); "Born This Way" (Lady Gaga; (auditionees); "Vi er helte" (Performed of Peter Bjørnskov and X Factor 2015 contestants)

Contestants' performances on the seventh live show
Act	Order	Free Choice Song	Order	Duet with Musical guest (Musical Guests)	Order	Winner's single	Result
Jógvan Joensen	1	"Yellow"	4	"København" (with Ulige Numre)	8	"Best Kept Secret"	Runner-up
Ivarsson, Bang & Neumann	2	"The High Road"	5	"Lipstick Lies" (with Julias Moon)	N/A	N/A (Already eliminated)	3rd Place
Emilie Esther	3	"Nature Boy"/"If I Were a Boy"/"Bitter Sweet Symphony"	6	"Karma Town" (with Stine Bramsen)	7	"Undiscovered"	Winner

== Controversies and criticism ==
On 25 March, two days before the final, Bente Boserup, leader of BørneTelefonen, criticized the Danish X Factor for exposing children under 18 to high pressure and stress, after contestants Baraa Qadoura and Tannaz Hakami broke down in tears during the fourth live show. This was supported by psychologist John Halse, as well as contestant Finn Irs, who protested by not showing up to the all-stars song during the final live show. Irs stated that the producers were more interested in their contestants showing their emotions, rather than making a musical show. Jan Lagermand Lundme, the contributing editor on DR1, stated that all contestants were checked by a psychologist to see if they were fit to handle the pressure.
