= Don't You Wait =

Don't You Wait may refer to:

- "Don't You Wait" (Solange Knowles song) (2016)
- "Don't You Wait", a 2016 song by Embrace
