= 2019 in Denmark =

- Decades: 1990s; 2000s; 2010s; 2020s
- See also: Other events of 2019; List of years in Denmark

Events in the year 2019 in Denmark.

== Incumbents ==
- Monarch – Margrethe II
- Prime Minister – Lars Løkke Rasmussen (until June 27)
  Mette Frederiksen (from June 27)

== Events ==
- 2 January – Great Belt Bridge rail accident: A DSB express passenger train is hit by a semi-trailer from a passing cargo train on the western bridge of the Great Belt Fixed Link in Denmark, killing eight people and making it the deadliest rail accident in the country since 1988.
- 10–27 January – 2019 World Men's Handball Championship – co-hosted with Germany
- 26 May – The 2019 European Parliament election
- 5 June – 2019 Danish general election
- 27 June – The Cabinet of Mette Frederiksen is presented.
- 16 August –; The government of Denmark rejects the suggestion that the United States might purchase Greenland.

== Sport ==
=== Badminton ===
- 27 January – Anders Antonsen wins gold in Men's Single at the 2019 Indonesia Masters.
- 17 February – Denmark wins the 2019 European Mixed Team Badminton Championships by defeating Germany 3–0 in the final.
- 19–24 February – Viktor Axelsen wins gold in Men's Single and Mia Blichfeldt wins gold in Women's Single at the 2019 Spain Masters.
- 24–31 March – Viktor Axelsen wins Men's Single at 2019 India Open.
- 25 August – Anders Antonsen wins silver in men's single at the 2019 BWF World Championships.
- 15– 2019 Denmark Open takes place in Odense.

=== Canoe and katak ===
- 25–28 June Denmark wins one gold medal and one bronze medal in Canoe sprint at the 2019 European Games.
- 25–28 July Denmark wins three gold medals and two silver medals at the 2019 Canoe Marathon European Championships-
- 21–25 August Denmark wins one bronze medal at the 2019 ICF Canoe Sprint World Championships.
- 17–20 October Denmark wins three gold medals, two silver medals and one bronze medal at the 2019 ICF Canoe Marathon World Championships.

=== Cycling ===
- 6 February – Kenny De Ketele (BEL) and Moreno De Pauw (BEL) win the Six Days of Copenhagen six-day track cycling race.
- 27 February – 3 March – Denmark wins one silver medal and two bronze medals at the 2019 UCI Track Cycling World Championships
- 39 April – Jakob Fuglsang wins 2019 Liège–Bastogne–Liège.
- 16 June – Jakob Fuglsang wins the Critérium du Dauphiné.
- 29 September – Mads Pedersen wins gold in Men's road race at the 2019 UCI Road World Championships.
- 16–20 October – 2019 UEC European Track Championships
- 17 October — Denmark wins gold in Team Pursuit at the 2019 UEC European Track Championships.
  - 17 October – Denmark wins a gold medal in Team Pursuit.
  - 20 October
    - Amalie Dideriksen and Julie Leth wins a gold medal for Denmark in Women's Madison.
    - Lasse Norman Hansen and Michael Mørkøv wins a gold medal for Denmark in Men's madison.

=== Equestrian sports ===
- 19–25 – Denmark wins two gold medals and three bronze medals at the 2019 FEI European Championships.

=== Golf ===
- 8 December – Rasmus Højgaard wins AfrAsia Bank Mauritius Open on the 2020 European Tour.

=== Handball ===
- 27 January – Denmark wins the 2019 World Men's Handball Championship in handball by defeating Norway 31–27 in the final.

=== Sailing ===
- 25 May – Anne-Marie Rindom wins gold in laser radial at the European championships in Portp.
- 24 July – Anne-Marie Rindom wins a gold medal in Lazer Radial at the world championships in Sakaiminato.
- 30 October – Anne-Marie Rindom wins the 2019 Women's World Sailor of the Year Award.

=== Tennis ===
- 8 June – Holger Rune wins the 2019 French Open – Boys' Singles.

== Deaths ==
- 5 May - Ib Glindemann, jazz composer and bandleader (born 1934)
- 10 June – Ib Nørlund, composer (born 1931)
- 31 December – Eva Sørensen, sculptor and ceramist (born 1940)
- 19 August – Lars Larsen, businessman, company founder (born 1948)

== See also ==
- 2019 European Parliament election
- 2019 in Danish music
- 2019 in the European Union

== Links ==
- Media related to 2019 in Denmark at Wikimedia Commons
