= Commitment Issues =

Single by Embrace
- Released: 2 April 2016
- Genre: Pop, Soul, Jazz
- Length: 3:15
- Label: Sony Music Denmark

"Commitment Issues" is the debut single of the Danish sister duo Embrace, winners of the ninth season of the Danish version of X Factor. The English language song was their winners song in the finale of the show on 1 April 2016. The song peaked on the Hitlisten, the official Danish singles chart, at number 18.

== Charts ==
Chart (2016)	Peak position
Denmark (Hitlisten)	18
