= Bring Us Together (album) =

Studio album by The Asteroids Galaxy Tour
- Released: September 15, 2014
- Genre: Psychedelic pop
- Length: 44:29
- Label: Hot Bus Records
- Producer: Lars Iversen

The Asteroids Galaxy Tour chronology
| Out of Frequency (2012) | Bring Us Together (2014) |

Bring Us Together is the third album by Danish pop band The Asteroids Galaxy Tour. The album was recorded at Viktoria Recording Studio, Copenhagen and was released on September 15, 2014, by Hot Bus Records.

Professional ratings
Review scores
| Source | Rating |
|---|---|
| Allmusic | 3.5/5 stars |

== Track listing ==
| No. | Title | Writer(s) | Length |
|---|---|---|---|
| 1. | "Bring Us Together" | Jacob Bellens, Lars Iversen, Mette Lindberg | 4:05 |
| 2. | "Navigator" | Jacob Bellens, Lars Iversen, Mette Lindberg | 5:09 |
| 3. | "My Club" | Lars Iversen, Mette Lindberg | 3:49 |
| 4. | "Get Connected" | Lars Iversen, Mette Lindberg | 3:46 |
| 5. | "Choke It" | Lars Iversen, Mette Lindberg | 5:15 |
| 6. | "Hurricane" | Lars Iversen, Mette Lindberg | 4:12 |
| 7. | "Rock the Ride" | James Collins, Lars Iversen, Peter Iversen, Mette Lindberg, Jacob Vølver | 4:11 |
| 8. | "I Am the Mountain" | Klara Sophia Byskov, Lars Iversen, Mette Lindberg | 5:31 |
| 9. | "Zombies" | Lars Iversen, Mette Lindberg | 4:48 |
| 10. | "X" | Lars Iversen, Mette Lindberg, Philip Trappaud Rønne | 3:43 |

iTunes Bonus Track
| No. | Title | Length |
|---|---|---|
| 11. | "My Club [Video]" | 3:49 |

== Release history ==
| Country | Date | Format | Label |
|---|---|---|---|
| Denmark | September 15, 2014 | CD, LP, Digital Download | Hot Bus Records |
