= Out of Frequency =

Studio album by The Asteroids Galaxy Tour
- Released: 31 January 2012
- Genre: Psychedelic pop
- Length: 47:12
- Label: BMG Rights
- Producer: Lars Iversen

The Asteroids Galaxy Tour chronology
Fruit (2009)	Out of Frequency (2012)	Bring Us Together (2014)

Singles from Out of Frequency
- 1. "Heart Attack" Released: 20 February 2012; 2. "Major" Released: 1 June 2012

Professional ratings
Aggregate scores
Source	Rating
Metacritic	60/100
Review scores
Source	Rating
Allmusic	4/5 stars

Out of Frequency is the second album by Danish band The Asteroids Galaxy Tour. It was released on 31 January 2012 by BMG Rights.

== Track listing ==
Standard Edition
No.	Title	Writer(s)	Length
1.	"Gold Rush, Pt. I"	Lars Iversen, Miloud Carl Sabri	1:05
2.	"Dollars in the Night"	Lars Iversen, Mette Lindberg	1:59
3.	"Gold Rush, Pt. II"	Lars Iversen	1:40
4.	"Major"	Lars Iversen	3:58
5.	"Heart Attack"	Lars Iversen, Mette Lindberg, Philip Trappaud Rønne	3:51
6.	"Out of Frequency"	Lars Iversen, Mads Brinch	4:34
7.	"Cloak & Dagger"	Lars Iversen, Mette Lindberg	4:08
8.	"Arrival of The Empress (Prelude)"	Lars Iversen	0:42
9.	"Theme from 45 Eugenia"	Lars Iversen	5:24
10.	"Mafia"	Lars Iversen, Mette Lindberg	4:09
11.	"Ghost in My Head"	Lars Iversen	4:37
12.	"Suburban Space Invader"	Lars Iversen, Mette Lindberg	4:26
13.	"Fantasy Friend Forever"	Lars Iversen, Mette Lindberg	3:15
14.	"When It Comes to Us"	Lars Iversen, Mette Lindberg	3:31

iTunes Bonus Track
No.	Title	Length
15.	"Givin' It Back"	4:10

== Charts ==
Chart performance for Out of Frequency
Chart (2012)	Peak position
Austrian Albums (Ö3 Austria)	68
Danish Albums (Hitlisten)	35
Dutch Albums (Album Top 100)	46
Swiss Albums (Schweizer Hitparade)	91

== Release history ==
Country	Date	Format	Label
United States	31 January 2012	CD, Digital Download, LP	Chrysalis Records
Denmark	24 February 2012	CD, Digital Download, LP	BMG Rights
Germany	24 February 2012	CD, Digital Download, LP	BMG Rights
Switzerland	24 February 2012	CD, Digital Download, LP	BMG Rights
Italy	27 February 2012	CD, Digital Download, LP	BMG Rights
United Kingdom	5 March 2012	CD, Digital Download, LP	BMG Rights
