= 2020 in Denmark =

- Decades: 2000s; 2010s; 2020s
- See also: Other events of 2020; List of years in Denmark

Events in the year 2020 in Denmark.

== Incumbents ==
- Monarch – Margrethe II
- Prime Minister – Mette Frederiksen

== Events ==
- 100 years since the reunification between North Schleswig (South Jutland) and Denmark.
- 250 years since the introduction of Freedom of the press in Denmark-Norway.

=== April ===
- 15 April – COVID-19 pandemic: Denmark partially lifts its lockdown rules, allowing children up to age 11 to return to school.

== Culture ==
=== Film ===
- 12 December – Another Round wins the awards for Best Film, Best Director (Thomas Vinterberg), Best Screenwriter, (Thomas Vinterberg and Tobias Lindholm) and Best Actor /Mads Mikkelsen) at the 33rd European Film Awards.

== Sports ==
=== Badminton ===
- 18–23 February – Viktor Axelsen wins gold in Men's Single and Kim Astrup and Anders Skaarup Rasmussen win gold in Men's Double at the 2020 Spain Masters.
- 15 March – Viktor Axelsen wins a gold medal in Men's Single at 2020 All England Open.
- 13–17 October 2020 Denmark Open takes place in Odense.
  - Anders Antonsen wins gold in men's single

=== Cycling ===
- 26 February – Denmark wins a gold medal in Men's team pursuit at the 2020 UCI Track Cycling World Championships.
- 1 March – Denmark wins a gold medal in Men's Madison at the 2020 UCI Track Cycling World Championships.
- 18 August – Cecilie Uttrup Ludwig wins Giro dell'Emilia Internazionale Donne Elite
- 11 October –
  - Casper Pedersen wins the 2020 Paris–Tours.
  - Mads Pedersen wins the 2020 Gent–Wevelgem.

=== Golf ===
- 30 August – Rasmus Højgaard wins the UK Championship on the 2020 European Tour.
- 22 November – Joachim B. Hansen wins Joburg Open on the 2020 European Tour.

=== Handball ===
- 3 to 20 December – The 2020 European Women's Handball Championship is held in Denmark and Norway.

=== Other ===
- 1 February – Sarah Mahfoud is new IBF world champion in featherweight after defeating Brenda Carabajal
- 11 October – Sverri Sandberg Nielsen wins gold in men's single sculler at the 2020 European Rowing Championships.

== Deaths ==
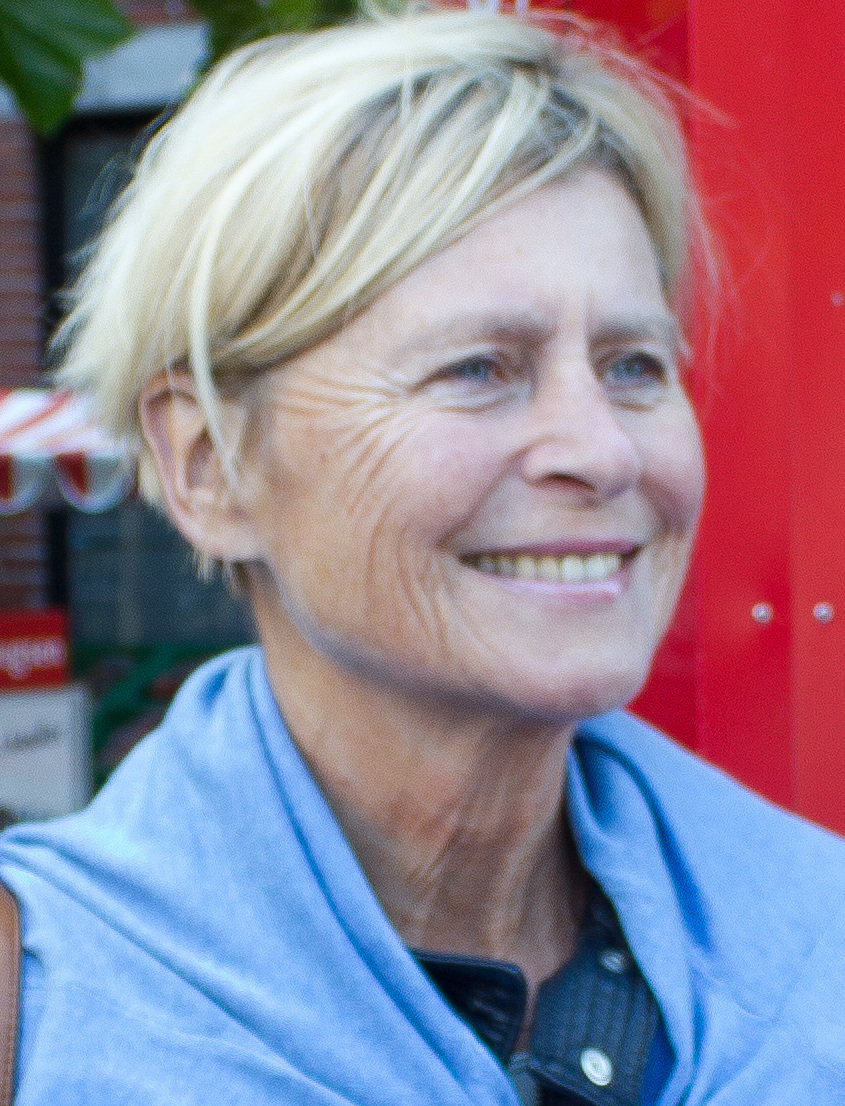
Lone Dybkjær

=== January–March ===
- 11 January – Tom Belsø, motor racing driver (b. 1942).

=== April–June ===
- 19 April – Cecil Bødker, author (born 1020)
- 29 June – Svend Aage Rask, footballer (b. 1935).

=== July–September ===
- 20 July – Lone Dybkjær, politician (b. 1940).
- 28 July – Bent Fabric, pianist and composer (b. 1924).
- 22 August – Ulla Pia, singer (b. 1945)

=== October–December ===
- 23 October – Ebbe Skovdahl, football manager (died 1945)
- 26 November – Allan Botschinsky, jazz musician
- 14 December – Per Carlsen, diplomat (born 1948)
