= The Asteroids Galaxy Tour =

Danish pop band

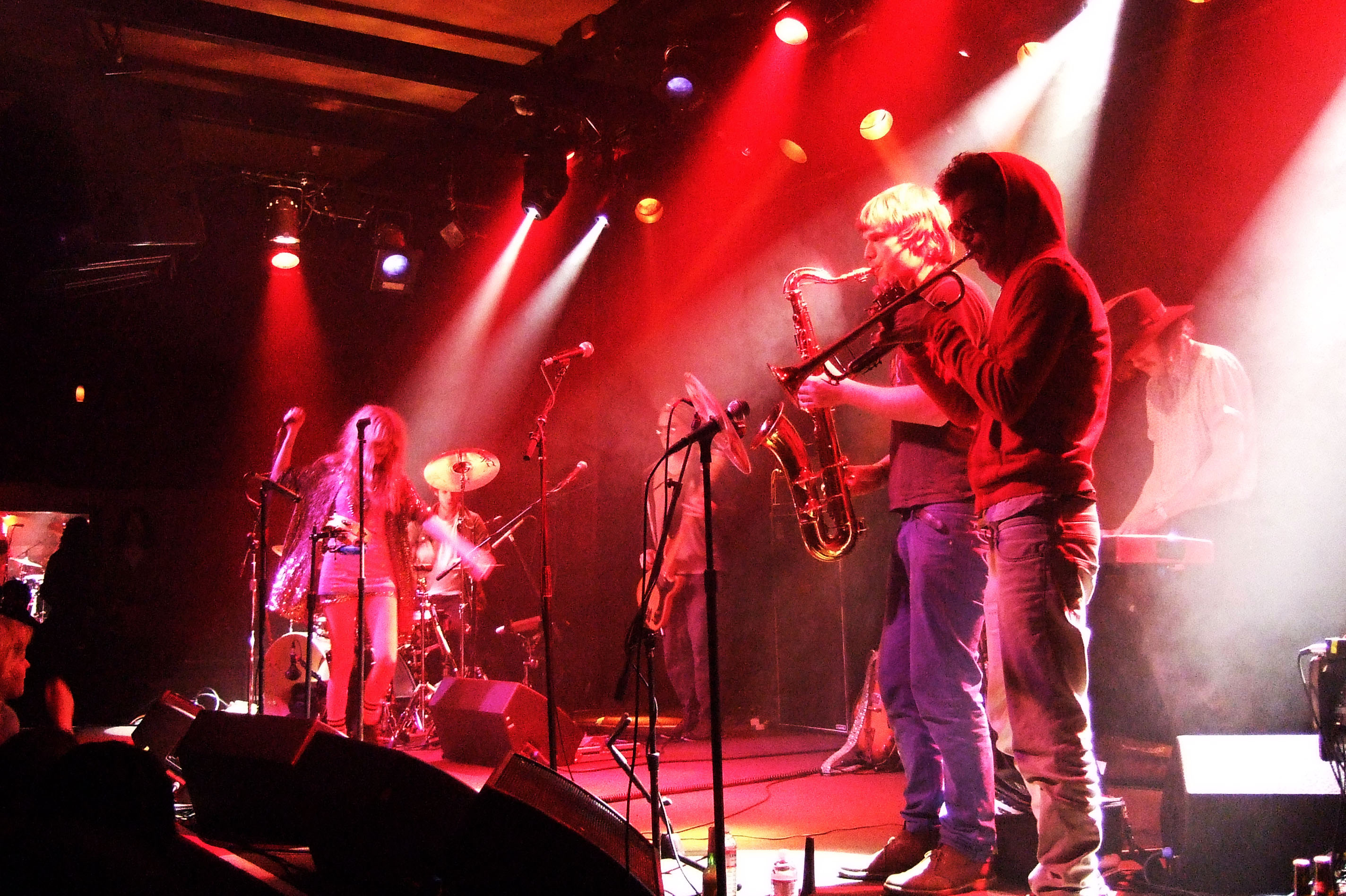

Background information
- Origin: Copenhagen, Denmark
- Genres: Pop, psychedelic pop, acid jazz, indie pop
- Years active: 2007–2020
- Labels: Small Giants, BMG Rights
- Members: Mette Lindberg (vocals); Lars Iversen (producer and bass guitar); Mikkel Balster Dørig (guitar); Simon Littauer (MPC and keys); Rasmus Littauer (drums)

The Asteroids Galaxy Tour is a Danish pop band consisting of vocalist Mette Lindberg and songwriter/producer Lars Iversen, formed in 2007. When performing live, the band extends to a five-piece, featuring Mikkel Balster Dørig (guitar), Simon Littauer (MPC and keys), and Rasmus Littauer (drums).

== History ==
In 2007, The Asteroids Galaxy Tour was formed in Copenhagen, Denmark.

Soon after being recorded, the band's demo was heard by the management of Amy Winehouse, who asked the group to be her opening act in Copenhagen. This was the band's first proper live show. Not long after that, the track "Around the Bend" was chosen by Apple to be used in the new iPod Touch commercial to be aired worldwide from December 2008. Following the success of the commercial, "Around the Bend" went on to become the band's biggest single to date, helping to launch the band onto the international stage.

In November 2008, lead singer Mette Lindberg was a guest on the BBC music quiz show Never Mind the Buzzcocks.

In 2009, the band were guests on the Danish morning TV show Good Morning Denmark. They have also guested on top French music show Taratata where they first performed the track "Inner City Blues", a cover of the Marvin Gaye classic, which later became a favourite of their live shows.

The band supported Katy Perry on several sold-out dates for her summer 2009 European tour.

On 21 September 2009, The Asteroids Galaxy Tour's debut album Fruit was released in Europe, followed by the USA release on 27 October 2009.

On 31 January 2012, the band released their second album, Out of Frequency.

On 15 September 2014, the band released their third album, Bring Us Together, via their own label Hot Bus Recordings and Rough Trade Distribution.

On 23 March 2018, the band released their new single "Surrender".

On 1 November 2020, the band announced in an Instagram post that they were on hiatus.

== Media appearances ==
Myer, Australia's largest department store chain, used the song "The Golden Age" to launch their 2009 summer range, and SBS Television used the song "The Golden Age" to promote the U.S. television series Mad Men.

"Around the Bend" is featured in the Anna Wintour documentary movie, The September Issue released in 2009. Apple used it in an iPod Touch ad in 2008.

In late 2008, three songs by the band were featured on the Gossip Girl episode "It's a Wonderful Lie". "Around the Bend" was also featured in the NBC TV series Chuck in episode 209 when Chuck walks into the "Roark Expo" for his first day at work at Roark Instruments. The song "Lady Jesus" was used throughout the entirety of a bar/restaurant scene in the USA Network show Suits. The song "Rock the Ride" was used during a bar scene in The CW series The Flash at the beginning of the episode "Plastique".

"The Sun Ain't Shining No More" has been chosen as the theme song of the Canadian action comedy television series InSecurity that premiered on 4 January 2011.

"The Golden Age" was featured in a 2011 Heineken television commercial, as well as in a 2022 television commercial for Deutsche Bahn.

"Heart Attack" was featured in the 2025 american fantasy comedy movie Freakier Friday, starring high-profile actresses Jamie Lee Curtis and Lindsay Lohan.

== Discography ==
=== Studio albums ===
Title	Details	Peak chart positions			
Title	Details	AUT	DEN	FRA	SWI
Fruit	Released: 21 September 2009; Label: Small Giants; Format: CD, digital download, vinyl	53	—	80	84
Out of Frequency	Released: January 31, 2012; Label: BMG Rights; Format: CD, digital download, vinyl	68	35	—	91
Bring Us Together	Released: September 15, 2014; Label: Hot Bus Records; Format: CD, digital download, vinyl	—	—	—	—
"−" denotes releases that did not chart or receive certification.

=== EPs ===
- The Sun Ain't Shining No More EP
- The Sun Ain't Shining No More (remixes) EP
- Around the Bend EP
- Live Session EP (iTunes exclusive)
- The Golden Age EP

=== Singles ===
Year	Title	Peak chart positions						Album
Year	Title	AUT	SWI	SPA	UK	CAN	US	Album
2008	"The Sun Ain't Shining No More"	—	—	—	—	—	—	Fruit
2008	"Around the Bend"	—	—	—	—	—	—	Fruit
2009	"The Golden Age"	4	7	19	70	60	109	Fruit
2012	"Major"	—	—	—	—	—	—	Out of Frequency
2012	"Heart Attack"	—	—	—	—	—	—	Out of Frequency
2014	"My Club"	—	—	—	—	—	—	Bring Us Together
2018	"Surrender"	—	—	—	—	—	—	
2018	"Apollo"	—	—	—	—	—	—	
2019	"Boy"	—	—	—	—	—	—	
2019	"Wave Teng (feat. Hot Ice)"	—	—	—	—	—	—	
2019	"Dynamite"	—	—	—	—	—	—	
"−" denotes releases that did not chart or receive certification.

== See also ==
- Mette Lindberg
