= Mads Christian =

- Birth name: Mads Christian Lyhne
- Born: 9 February 2000 (age 25); Copenhagen, Denmark
- Origin: Denmark
- Genres: Pop
- Occupation: Singer
- Instruments: Guitar, piano
- Years active: 2016–present
- Labels: Capitol; Universal Music; Warner

Mads Christian Lyhne (born 9 February 2000), better known as Mads Christian, is a Danish singer who competed in the ninth season of the Danish series of The X Factor. Only 15 years old entering the contest, he was eliminated in live show 4, coming in 6th place. Christian released his first single, "Crash Landing", in June 2016, and "Clothes", "Gucci Shoes" and "Just Give Me Time" in early 2017 during his time with Warner Music. Christian was signed by Mermaid Records in March 2018, where he took on a project to release an album in Danish. The eight-song album Naiv was released in February 2019, yet prior to this the singles "Du Ringer Bare", "Engangsting", "Hva' ska vi nå?" and "Romeo & Julie" from the album were released, starting May 2018. All songs on the album were written and co-composed by Christian. Christian was later signed by Capitol Records, Universal Music Denmark and released an average of five new songs per year, as well as touring nationally both solo and with his band.

== Performances during X Factor ==
Episode	Theme	Song	Artist	Result
Audition	Free choice	"The A Team"	Ed Sheeran	Through to 5 Chair Challenge
5 Chair Challenge	Free choice	"Thinking Out Loud"	Ed Sheeran	Through to bootcamp
Bootcamp	Free choice	"Love Yourself"	Justin Bieber	Through to live shows
Live show 1	Signature	"Locked Out of Heaven"	Bruno Mars	Safe (6th)
Live show 2	Scandanavien songs	"Uopnåelig"	Marie Key	Safe (6th)
Live show 3	Songs from the contestant's birthyears	"Trouble"	Coldplay	Bottom two (6th)
Live show 3	Save me song	"Life Is Worth Living"	Justin Bieber	Saved
Live show 4	Radiohits	"Stitches"	Shawn Mendes	Bottom two (6th)
Live show 4	Save me song	"It Will Rain"	Bruno Mars	Eliminated

== Legal issue ==
In 2016 Mads Christian's father Allan Lyhne received a call by the Danish police that informed him that they intended to charge the then 16 year old singer with distribution of child pornography. The 17-year-old singer is accused of recording four pornographic videos with an underage girl and sharing them with multiple friends without the girl's permission. Mads Christian, who was 15 at the time, met the girl in February 2015 and suggested on a date that they record a video of a blowjob. The girl accepted it, as long as you couldn't see her face.

On 7 March 2017 Mads Christian was acquitted of indecent exposure but was found guilty of Charge 1, which involved consent for the videos being recorded. He was found partially guilty of Charge 2, which concerned the three video sequences. He was found guilty of having forwarded two videos. This involved the video depicting oral sex and the video where he touches the girl inside her pants. The panel of judges unanimously found Mads Christian guilty of Charges 1 and 2. Mads Christian was sentenced to 14 days in prison with a probation period of one year. The sentence was conditional, meaning Mads Christian did not serve jail time on the condition he did not commit any new offenses during the probation period.

== Discography ==
=== Albums ===
- Overtænker (2021) – No. 34 Denmark

=== Singles ===
List of singles, with selected details and chart positions
Title	Year	Peak chart positions	Album
Title	Year	DEN	Album
"Clothes"	2017	—	Non-album singles
"Gucci Shoes"	2017	—	Non-album singles
"Just Give Me Time"	2017	—	Non-album singles
"Du Ringer Bare"	2018	—	Non-album singles
"Stille"	2024	34	Non-album singles
"—" denotes a recording that did not chart or was not released in that territory.
