= Citybois =

Danish pop music duo

- Origin: Gentofte, Denmark
- Genre: Pop
- Years active: 2014-2020 (on hiatus)
- Labels: Epic, Sony
- Members: Anthon Edwards Knudtzon; Thor Blanchez Farlov

Citybois is a Danish pop music duo from Gentofte, Denmark. The band was formed by Anthon Edwards Knudtzon and Thor Blanchez Farlov to compete on the eight season of the Danish version of X Factor. They were eliminated in the semi-final, coming in fourth place after they received the fewest votes from the Danish public. They have released two studio albums, What Bois About To, and Bois Forever.

== Performances during X Factor ==
Episode	Theme	Song	Artist	Result
Audition	Free choice	"Ain't No Sunshine"	Bill Withers	Through to 5 Chair Challenge
5 Chair Challenge	Free choice	"How Deep Is Your Love"	Bee Gees	Through to bootcamp
Bootcamp	Free choice	"Hold On, We're Going Home"	Drake	Through to live shows
Live show 1	Signature	"Former"	Thøger Dixgaard	Safe (5th)
Live show 2	Grammy nominated hits	"Maniac"	Michael Sembello	Safe (1st)
Live show 3	Contemporary hits	"The Strip"	Scarlet Pleasure	Safe (2nd)
Live show 4	Danish hits	"Lørdag aften"	Ukendt Kunstner	Safe (3rd)
Live show 5	Songs from Movies (accompanied by DR Bigband)	"Earned It"	The Weeknd	Safe (3rd)
Live show 6 - Semi-final	Viewers Choice	"Kongens Have"	TopGunn	Eliminated (4th)
Live show 6 - Semi-final	Judges choice	"Belong to the World"	The Weeknd	Eliminated (4th)

== Discography ==
=== Albums ===
Year	Album	Peak positions	Certifications
Year	Album	DEN	Certifications
2020	Bois Forever	1	IFPI DEN: 2× Platinum

=== EPs ===
- What Bois About To (2015)

=== Singles ===
Year	Single	Peak chart positions	Certifications	Album
Year	Single	DEN	Certifications	Album
2015	"Things We Do"	4	Gold	What Bois About To
2015	"Purple Light"	23	Gold	What Bois About To
2015	"Ridin'"	27		What Bois About To
2016	"Bedre End Rihanna"	10	Gold	Non-album singles
2016	"Hånd i Hånd"	—		Non-album singles
2016	"Som Om"	20		Non-album singles
2016	"Under 18"	22	Gold	Non-album singles
2017	"Hjem igen"	—	Gold	Non-album singles
2017	"Dum Som Mig"	11		Non-album singles
2017	"Pool" (feat. TopGunn)		Gold	Non-album singles
2017	"Jakke"	39		Non-album singles
2018	"De Eneste"	33		Non-album singles
2018	"Ring på dig"	32		Non-album singles
2018	"Helt Fair"	28		Non-album singles
2018	"Synger for mig" (with Skinz)	9		Non-album singles
2019	"Sig Mig"	11		Non-album singles
2019	"Finde tilbage"	4	DK: Gold	Non-album singles
2019	"Natten rammer" (with Boua)	34		Non-album singles
2020	"Det kom som et chok"	19		Bois Forever
2020	"Se os"	21		Bois Forever
2020	"Sol over København (feat Kesi)"	2		Bois Forever
2020	"Ringer | Morgen"	31		Bois Forever
2020	"Kærlighed Gør Blind"	32		Bois Forever
