= 2021 in Denmark =

- Decades: 2000s; 2010s; 2020s
- See also: Other events of 2021; List of years in Denmark

Events in the year 2021 in Denmark.

== Incumbents ==
- Monarch – Margrethe II
- Prime Minister – Mette Frederiksen

== Events ==
Ongoing – COVID-19 pandemic in Denmark

=== January ===
- 5 January 2021 – Following a press conference by Prime Minister Mette Frederiksen, the restrictions due to coronavirus are tightened.
- 6 January – The Danish Meteorological Institute (Danish: Dansk Meteorologisk Institut, DMI) releases its annual report for the year 2020. It makes national headlines after it is revealed that there were no days in which the temperature remained under 0 degrees Celsius for the entire day for the first time since records began.

=== April ===
- 13 April – The Danish state strips the renewal of temporary residency permits to about 189 Syrian refugees, claiming that it is "now safe to return to Syria."
- 15 April – Mads Nissen wins the 2021 World Press Photo of the Year Award.

== Sports ==
=== Badminton ===
- 31 January – Viktor Axelsen wins gold in Men's Single at the 2020 BWF World Tour Finals by defeating Anders Antonsen in the final.
- 20 February – Denmark wins the 2021 European Mixed Team Badminton Championships by defeating France 3–0 in the final.
- 2–7 March – Viktor Axelsen wins gold in Men's Single and Kim Astrup and Anders Skaarup Rasmussen win gold in Men's Double at Swiss Open.
- 19–24October 2021 Denmark Open takes place in Odense.
  - Viktor Axelsen wins gold in men's single
- 5 December – Viktor Axelsen wins gold in Men's Single at the 2021 BWF World Tour Finals.
- 12–19 December – Denmark wins two bronze medals at the 2021 BWF World Championships.

=== Canoe and katak ===
- 3–6 June – Denmark wins twogold medals and one bronze medal at the 2021 Canoe Sprint European Championships.
- 16–19 September The 2021 ICF Canoe Sprint World Championships are held in Copenhagen. Denmark wins one gold medal, one silver medal and three bronze medals.
- 30 September – 3 October – Denmark wins three gold medals, two silver medalsand one bronze medal at the 2021 ICF Canoe Marathon World Championships-

=== Cycling ===
- 23 February – Jonas Vingegaard wins Stage 5 of UAE Tour.
- 28 February – Mads Pedersen wins Kuurne–Brussels–Kuurne.
- 14 March – Magnus Cort wins Stage 8 of Paris–Nice.
- 15 March – Mads Würtz Schmidt wins Stage 6 of Tirreno–Adriatico.
- 22 March – Andreas Kron wins Stage1 of Volta a Catalunya.
- 26 March – Kasper Asgreen wins 2021 E3 Saxo Bank Classic.
- 27 March – Jonas Vingegaard wins 2021 Settimana Internazionale di Coppi e Bartali and Mikkel Frølich Honoré finishes second in the same race.
- 4 April – Kasper Asgreen wins Tour of Flanders.
- 11 June – Andreas Kron wins Stage 6 of the 2021 Tour de Suisse.
- 15 September – Michael Valgren wins Giro di Toscana.
- 24 October – Lasse Norman Hansen and Michael Mørkøv win the gold in Men's omnium at the 2021 UCI Track Cycling World Championships.

=== Equestrian sports ===
- 7–12 September – Denmark wins a silver medal and two bronze medals at the 2021 European Dressage Championships.

=== Golf ===
- 29 August – Rasmus Højgaard wins Omega European Masters on the 2021 European Tour.
- 5 September – Nicolai Højgaard wins Italian Open on the 2021 European Tour.|
- 24 October – Jeff Winther win Mallorca Golf Open on the 2021 European Tour.|
- 14 November – Joachim B. Hansen wins the Dubai Championship on the 2021 European Tour.

=== Swimming ===
- 16–19 September – Copenhagen hosts the 2021 ICF Canoe Sprint World Championships. Denmark wins one gold medal, one silver medal and three bronze medals.

=== Other ===
- 12 December Denmark wins one gold medal and one silver medal at the 2021 European Cross Country Championships.

== Deaths ==
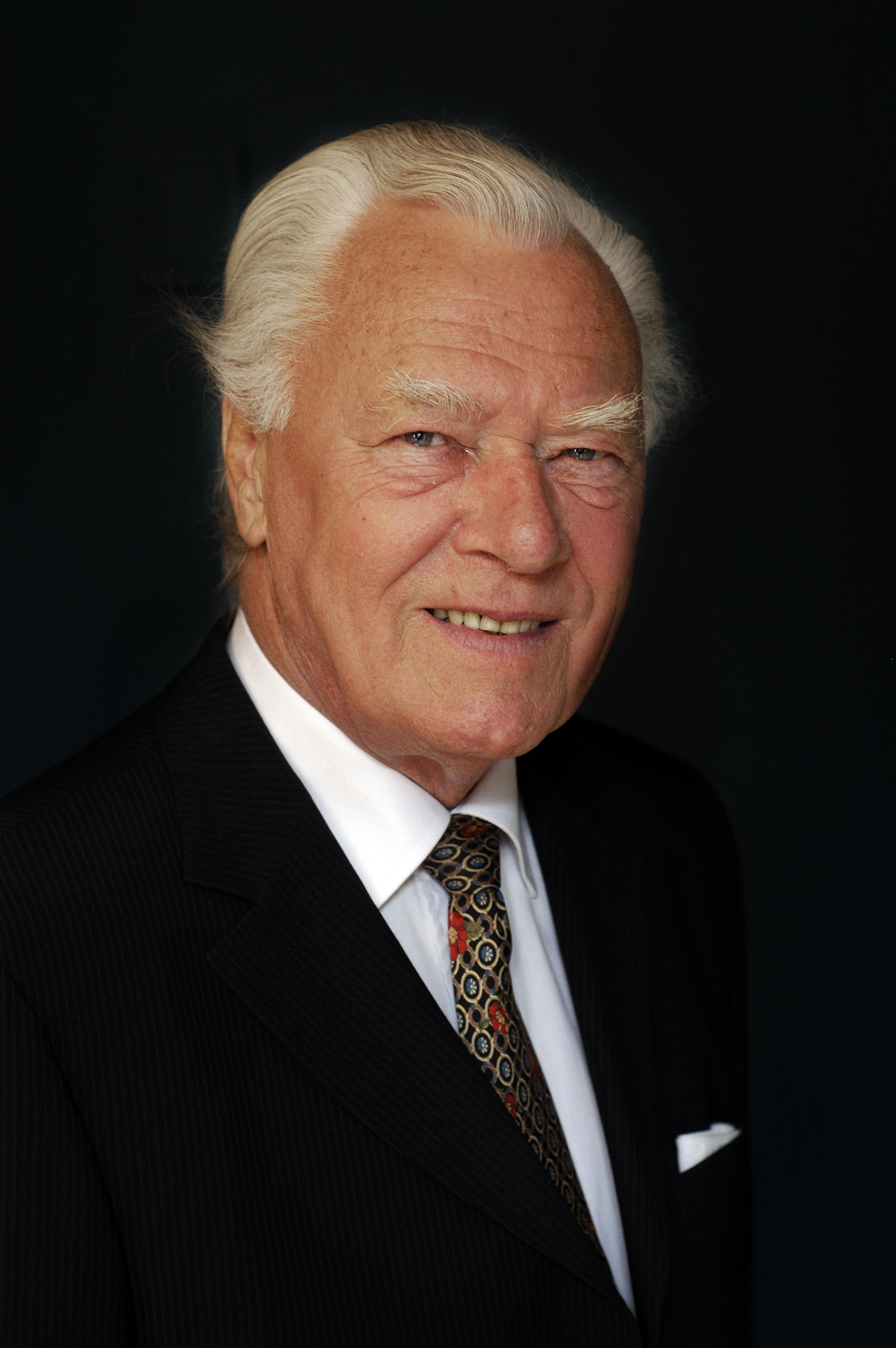
Poul Schlüter.

=== January–March ===
- 19 April – Birgitte Reimer, film actress (born 1926)

=== April–June ===
- 30 April – Flemming Hansen, politician (born 1939)
- 4 May – Kirsten Stallknecht, president of the International Council of Nurses (born 1937)
- 10 May – Johannes Møllehave, priest and writer (born 1937)
- 25 May – Ib Georg Jensen, ceramist, designer and author (born 1927)
- 27 May – Poul Schlüter, politician and former prime minister (born 1929)
- 15 June – Lily Weiding, actor (born 1924)

=== July–September ===
- 20 July – Vita Andersen, poet, novelist, playwright and children's writer (born 1942).

=== October–December ===
- 16 October – Anders Bodelsenm author (born 1836)
- 11 November – Per Aage Brandt, writer, poet, linguist and musician (born 1944)
