= The Golden Age (song) =

Single by the Asteroids Galaxy Tour

from the album Fruit
- Released: September 13, 2009 (Denmark)
- Recorded: 2009
- Genre: Indie pop, acid jazz
- Length: 3:50
- Label: Small Giants
- Songwriters: Lars Iversen, Mette Lindberg
- Producer: Lars Iversen

The Asteroids Galaxy Tour singles chronology
"Around the Bend" (2008)	"The Golden Age" (2009)	"Major" (2011)

"The Golden Age" is a song recorded by Danish indie pop band the Asteroids Galaxy Tour. The song was released as a single on September 13, 2009, as a digital download in Denmark from their debut studio album Fruit. The song was produced by Lars Iversen and written by Mette Lindberg and Lars Iversen. The song has charted in Austria, Spain, Switzerland, United Kingdom, Canada and United States.

== Music video ==
A music video to accompany the release of "The Golden Age" was first released onto YouTube on August 7, 2009, at a total length of three minutes and fifty-six seconds. It features The Asteroids Galaxy Tour performing in the space which portrays the planets of the Solar System.

== Allusions within the song ==
The song makes allusion to the Rat Pack of Hollywood. It later makes reference to the character Sally Bowles from the musical Cabaret, based on the Christopher Isherwood book Goodbye to Berlin.

== Heineken and Deutsche Bahn advertisements ==
The song was used in a 2011 Heineken advertisement, as well as one in 2022 for Deutsche Bahn.

== Track listing ==
Digital download
No.	Title	Length
1.	"The Golden Age"	3:50

== Chart performance ==
=== Weekly ===
Chart (2011/13)	Peak position
Austria (Ö3 Austria Top 40)	4
Canada (Canadian Hot 100)	60
Ireland (IRMA)	91
Netherlands (Single Top 100)	27
Spain (Promusicae)	19
Switzerland (Schweizer Hitparade)	7
UK Singles (The Official Charts Company)	70
US Billboard Bubbling Under Hot 100	9

=== Year-end charts ===
Chart (2011)	Position
Austrian Singles Chart	43
Swiss Singles Chart	58

== Certifications ==
Country	Certification
Austria	Gold
Italy	Gold

== Release history ==
Country	Release date	Format
United Kingdom	September 6, 2009	Digital download
Denmark	September 13, 2009	Digital download
