= VKation =

Danish pop duo

- Origin: Odense, Denmark
- Genres: Pop
- Years active: 2017-2019 (on hiatus)
- Labels: Sony
- Members: Victor Vedel Kruse; William Vedel Kristensen

VKation is a Danish pop music duo from Odense, Denmark. The band was formed by the cousins Victor Vedel Kruse & William Vedel Kristensen to compete in the tenth season of the Danish version of the X Factor. They were eliminated in the semi-final, coming in 4th place.

== Performances during X Factor ==
Episode	Theme	Song	Artist	Result
Audition	Free choice	"No Diggity"	Blackstreet featuring, Dr. Dre and Queen Pen	Through to 5 Chair Challenge
5 Chair Challenge	Free choice	"Junk of the Heart"	The Kooks	Through to bootcamp
Bootcamp	Free choice	"Odinariy People"	John Legend	Through to live shows
Live show 1	Signature	"Angel Zoo"	Phlake	Safe (5th)
Live show 2	Songs from the judges decades	"Take On Me"	A-ha	Safe (4th)
Live show 3	Break-up songs	"Summertime Sadness"	Lana Del Rey	Bottom two (7th)
Live show 3	Save me song	"You're Not Alone"	Mads Langer	Saved
Live show 4	Crooners and Divas accompanied by DR Big Band	"Unchained Melody"	Todd Duncan	Safe (1st)
Live show 5	International Hits	"I Feel It Coming"	The Weeknd feat. Daft Punk	Bottom two (4th)
Live show 5	Save me song	"Overleve"	Ukendt Kunstner	Saved
Live show 6 - Semi-final	Anniversary Song (songs previously performed by previous finalists)	"Stay with Me"	Sam Smith	Eliminated (4th)
Live show 6 - Semi-final	Viewers Choice	"Final Song"	MØ	Eliminated (4th)

== Discography ==
=== Singles ===
Year	Single	Peak chart positions	Certifications	Album
Year	Single	DEN	Certifications	Album
2018	"Legende Let"			N/A
2018	"Telefon"			N/A
2018	"Me Gustas"			N/A
2019	"Hun vil ha"			N/A
2019	"1 Chance til"			N/A
