= Mette Lindberg =

Danish vocalist

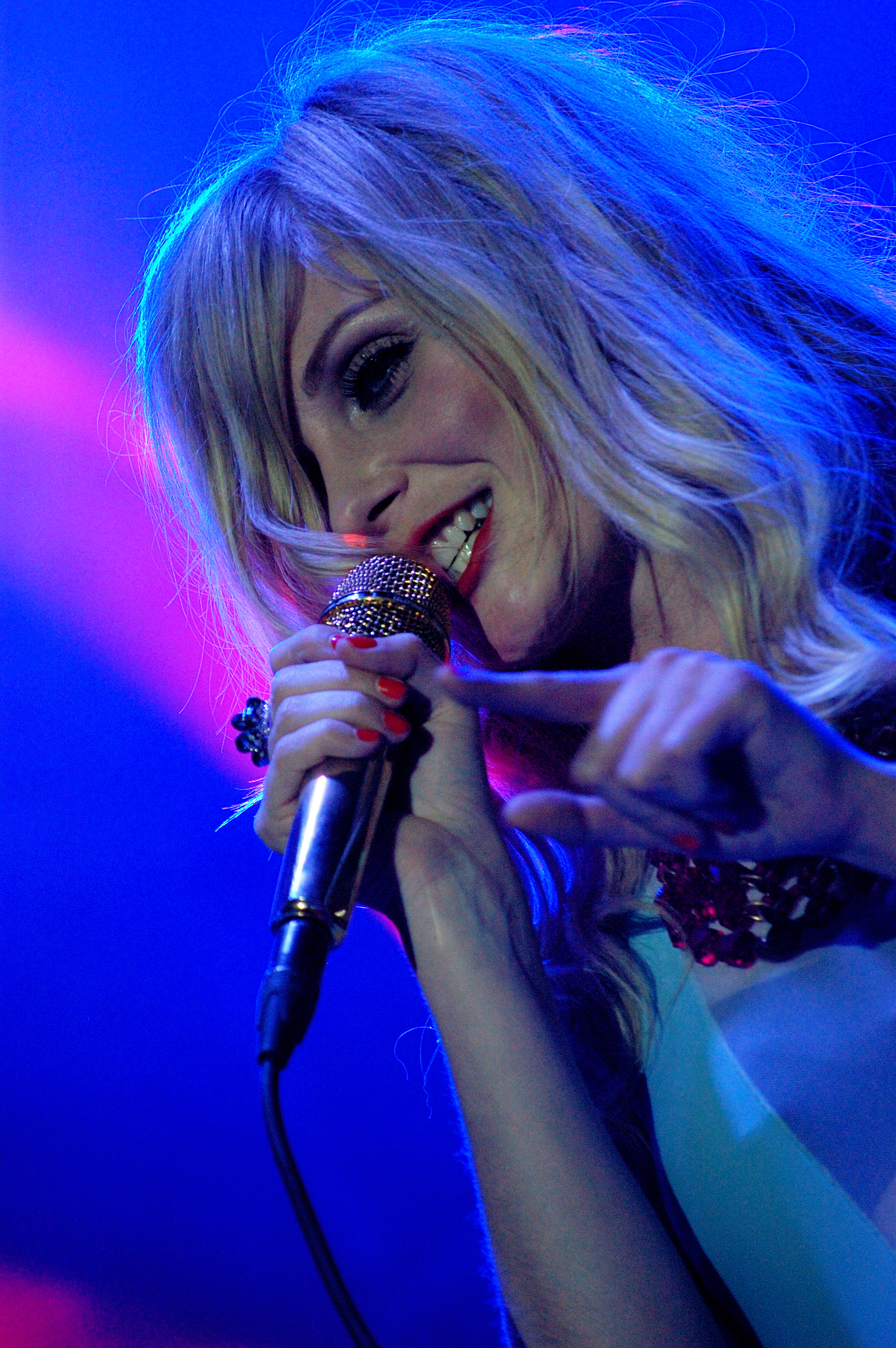
- Mette Lindberg (2012; age 28)

Background information
- Also known as: Mette Lax
- Born: Mette Lindberg; 2 December 1983 (age 42); Herlev, Denmark
- Genres: Psychedelic pop
- Occupation: Musician
- Instrument: Vocals
- Years active: 2007–present
- Labels: Small Giants, BMG Rights
- Website: theasteroidsgalaxytour.com/site/

Mette Lindberg (born 2 December 1983) is a Danish vocalist for psychedelic pop group The Asteroids Galaxy Tour, paired with songwriter/producer Lars Iversen.

The band has produced three studio albums to date: Fruit (2009); Out of Frequency (2012); and Bring Us Together (2014).

Lindberg appeared as a judge on the ninth season of the Danish Version of The X Factor. She mentored the 15-to-22-year-olds category. Lindberg had two acts in the final, Reem Hamze and Alex Benson, but they finished as runner-up and third placer, respectively, after the competition was won by Embrace.

== See also ==
- The Asteroids Galaxy Tour
