= 2018 in Denmark =

- Decades: 1990s; 2000s; 2010s; 2020s
- See also: Other events of 2018; List of years in Denmark

Events in the year 2018 in Denmark.

== Incumbents ==
- Monarch – Margrethe II
- Prime Minister – Lars Løkke Rasmussen

== Events ==
=== May ===
- May 31 – It was announced that Denmark would be banning full-face veils.

== The Arts ==
=== Film ===
- 19 November – Lars Mikkelsen wins an International Emmy Award for Best Actor at the 46th International Emmy Awards for his role in Herrens veje.

== Sport ==
=== Badminton ===
- 16–21 January – Viktor Axelsen wins gold in Men's Single and Kamilla Rytter Juhl and Christinna Pedersen win gold in Women's Double at 2018 Malaysia Masters.
- 30 January-4 February – Mathias Christiansen and Christinna Pedersen win Men's Double at 2018 India Open.
- 14–18 March – Kamilla Rytter Juhl and Christinna Pedersen wins gold in Women's Doubles at 2018 All England Open.
- 24–29 April – With two gold medals, two, silver medals and four bronze medals, Denmark finishes as the best nation at the 2018 European Badminton Championships.
- 15–21 October 2018 Denmark Open takes place in Odense.
- 2 September – Rasmus Gemke wins gold in Men's Single and Niclas Nøhr and Sara Thysesen win gold in Mixed Double at the 2018 Spain Masters.

=== Canoe and kayal ===
- 8–10 June – Denmark wins a bronze medal at the 2018 Canoe Sprint European Championships.
- 5–8 July – Denmark wins a silver medal and a bronze medal at the 2018 Canoe Marathon European Championships.
- 22–26 August – Denmark wins two silver medals at the 2018 ICF Canoe Sprint World Championships.
- 6–9 September – Denmark wins two gold medals at the 2018 ICF Canoe Marathon World Championships.

=== Cycling ===
- 6 February – Kenny De Ketele (BEL) and Michael Mørkøv (DEN) win the Six Days of Copenhagen six-day track cycling race.
- 24 February – Christina Siggaard wins Omloop Het Nieuwsblad.
- 27 February – 4 March – Denmark wins two silver medals and one bronze medal at the 2018 UCI Track Cycling World Championships
- 1 April – Mads Pedersen finishes second in the Tour of Flanders.
- 15 April – Michael Valgren wins the Amstel Gold Race.
- 4–20 May – 2018 IIHF World Championship will be hosted by Copenhagen and Herning, Denmark.
- 12 June – Christopher Juul-Jensen wins Stage 4 of the 2018 Tour de Suisse.
- 14 June – Søren Kragh Andersen wins Stage 6 of the 2018 Tour de Suisse.
- 22 July – Magnus Cort wins the 15th stage of the Tour de France.
- 7 October – Søren Kragh Andersen wins 2018 Paris–Tours.

=== Equestrian sports ===
- 11 September Denmark wins two gold medals and one bronze medal at the 2018 FEI World Equestrian Games in Germany.

=== Golf ===
- 3 June Thorbjørn Olesen wins Italian Open on the 2018 European Tour.
- 8 September – Denmark wins the Eisenhower Trophy for the first time.
- 30 September – Thorbjørn Olesen wins the 2018 Ryder Cup as part of the European team.
- 7 October – Lucas Bjerregaard wins Alfred Dunhill Links Championship in the 2018 European Tour.

=== Sailing ===
- 30–12 August – The 2018 Sailing World Championships are held in Aarhus.
  - Anne-Marie Rindom wins a bronze medal in Laser Radial.

=== Swimming ===
- 3–12 August – Denmark wins three silver medals and one bronze medal at the 2018 European Aquatics Championships.

=== Tennis ===
- 27 January – Caroline Wozniacki wins Australian Open.
- 1–7 October – Caroline Wozniacki wins China Open.

=== Other ===
- 18 April – In basketball, Bakken Bears loses a 2017–18 FIBA Europe Cup semifinal to S.S. Felice Scandone.
- 14 July – Helle Frederiksen wins a gold medal in the ITU Long Distance Triathlon World Championships.
- 4–11 August – With one gold medal, one silver medal and one bronze medal, Denmark finishes as the fourth best nation at the 2018 World Orienteering Championships.

== Deaths ==
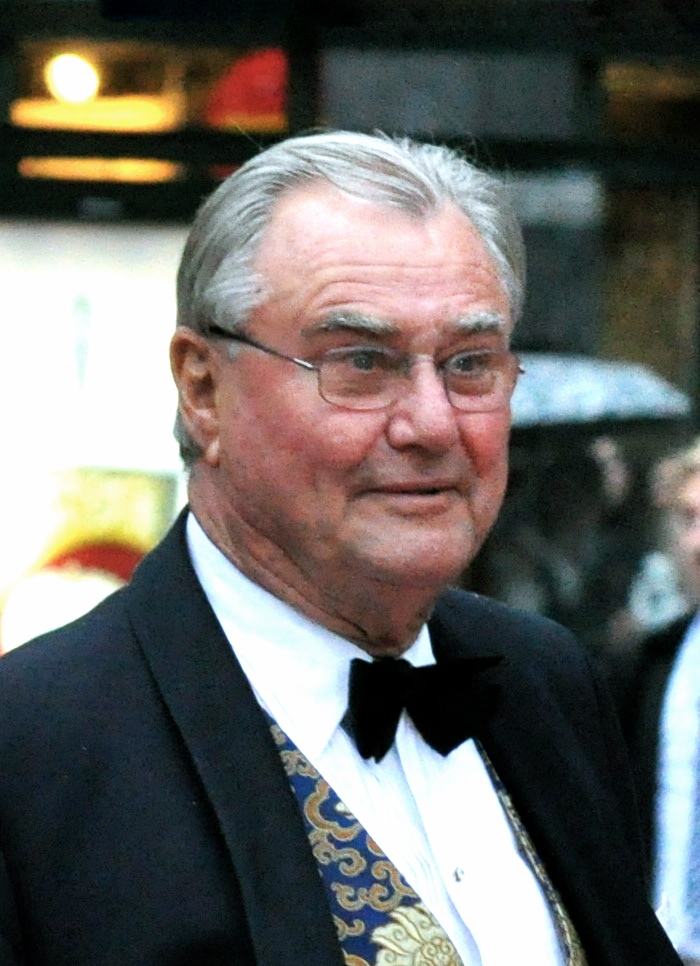
Prince Henrik.

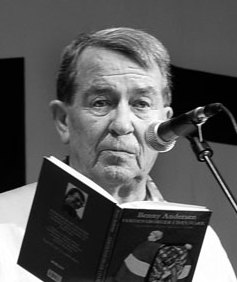
Benny Andersen.

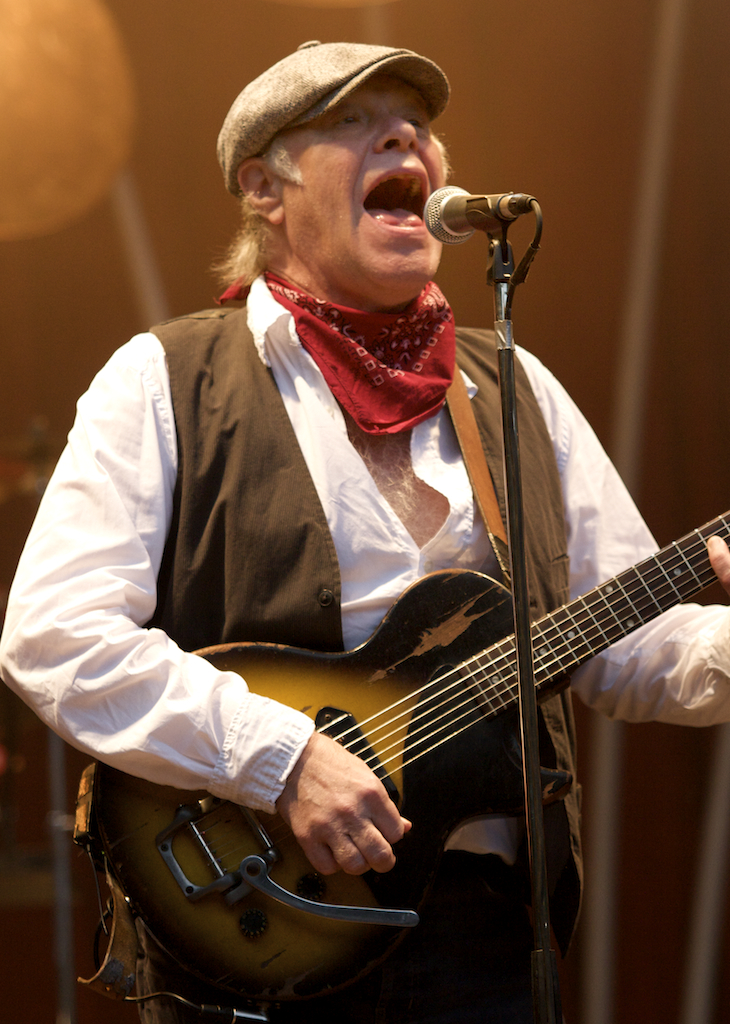
Kim Larsen.

=== January–March ===
- 14 January – Erling Mandelmann, photographer (born 1935)
- 21 January – Jens Okking, actor (born 1939)
- 2 February – Ole Thestrup, actor (born 1948)
- 13 February – Prince Henrik, Prince Consort (born 1934)
- 19 February – Nini Theilade, ballet dancer and choreographer (born 1915)

=== April–June ===
- 16 May – Nils Foss, engineer, company founder (born 1928)
- 5 April – Grethe Krogh, organist and professor (born 1928)
- 9 May – Per Kirkeby, artist (born 1938)
- 25 May – Merete Ries, publisher (born 1938)
- 28 May – Jens Christian Skou, biochemist and Nobel Prize laureate (born 1918)
- 19 June – Princess Elisabeth of Denmark, member of the extended Danish royal family (born 1935)

=== July–September ===
- 16 August – Benny Andersen, writer and composer (born 1929)
- 30 September – Kim Larsen, musician (born 1945)

=== October–December ===
- 14 November – Morten Grunwald, actor (born 1934)
- 12 December – Troels Wörsel, painter (born 1950)
- 23 December – Troels Kløvedal, author and sailor (born 1943)

== See also ==
- 2018 in the European Union
- 2018 in Europe
