= Julias Moon =

Danish electro pop duo

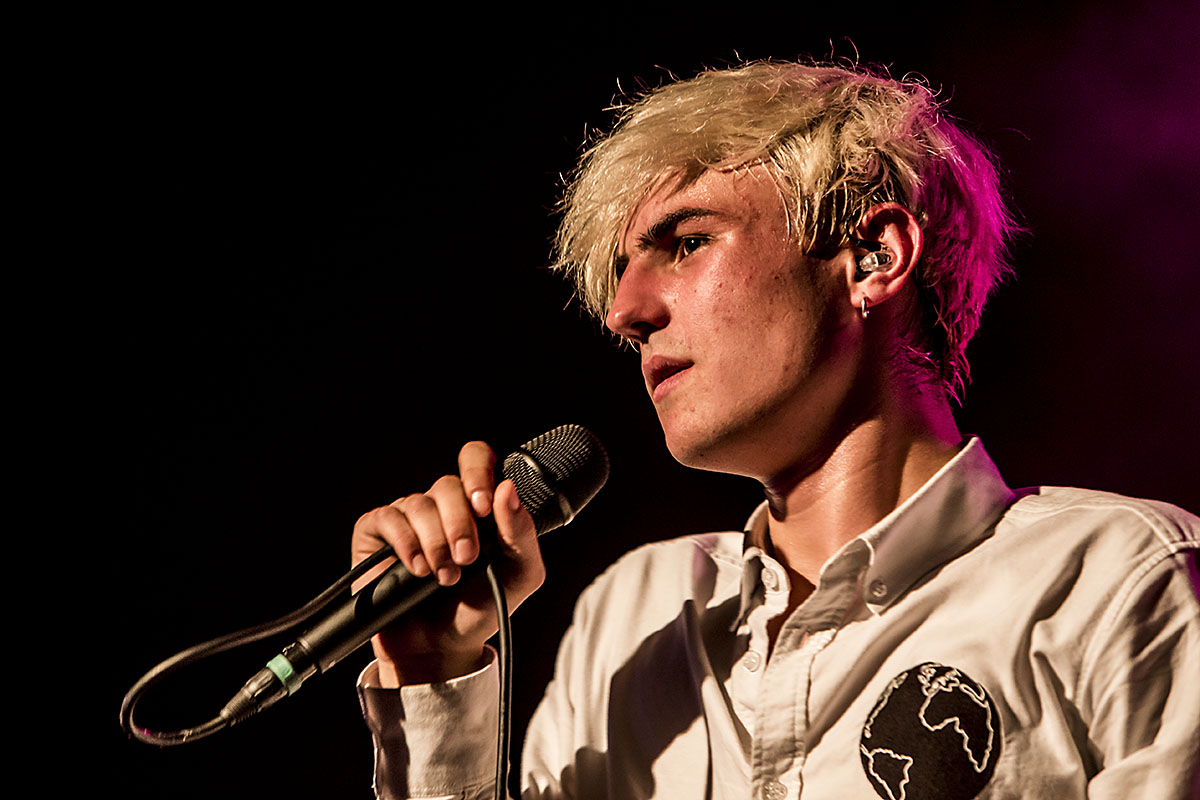
- Julias Moon's vocalist Louis Samson Myhre

Background information
- Origin: Copenhagen, Denmark
- Genres: Electropop; Pop music
- Years active: 2013–2016, 2020–present
- Labels: Copenhagen Records, Universal Music
- Members: Louis Samson; Oliver Kincaid
- Past members: Nicolai Gabold; Thorval Naur; Felix Ewert; Zac Celinder; Nicholas Kincaid
- Website: www.juliasmoon.com

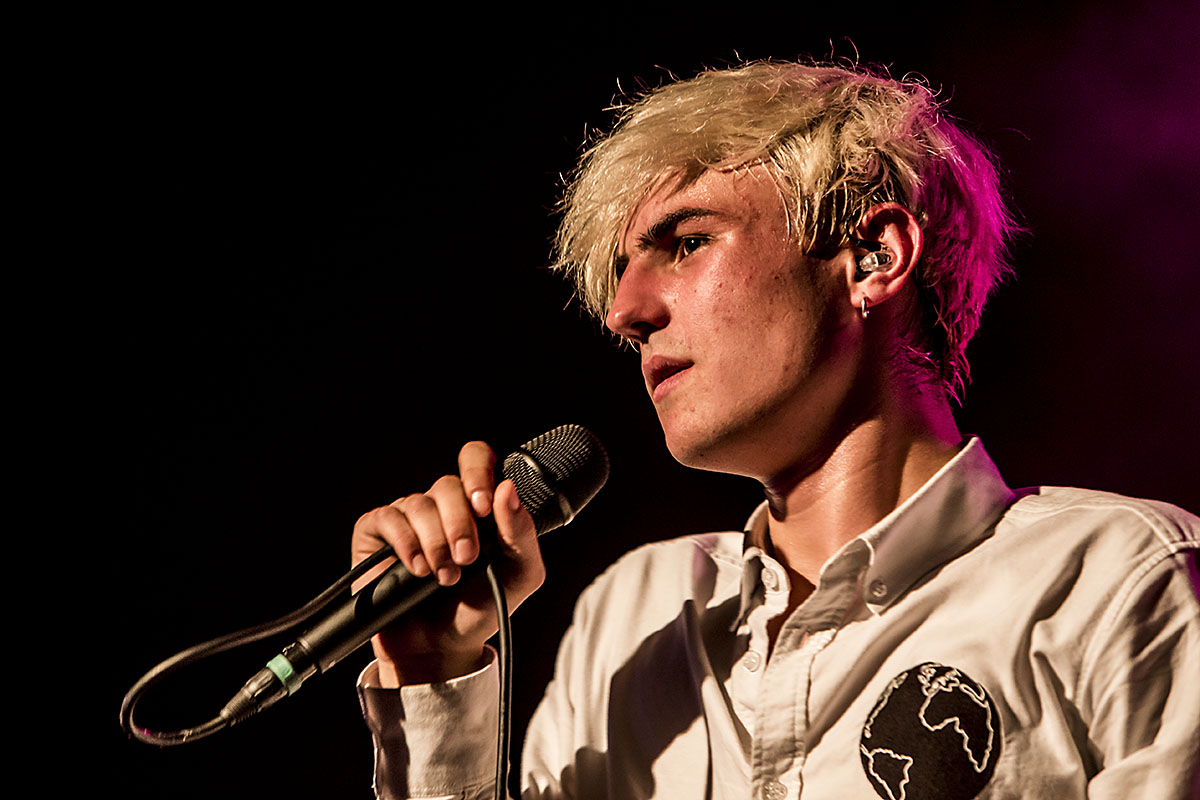
Julias Moon's vocalist Louis Samson Myhre

Julias Moon is a Danish electro pop duo based in Copenhagen. Originally launched in 2013 as a trio with Nicolai Gabold, the band’s sound later became defined by the songwriting and production duo of Oliver Kincaid and Louis Samson, creating a characteristic streamlined song format with the focus on strong melodic hooks and notable use of falsetto vocals. The band achieved considerable success with their hit singles "Bay" in 2013, and the follow-ups "Lipstick Lies", "Palace” and ”Camera”. These all charted in tracklisten, the official Danish Singles Chart. After extensive touring with a live band including Felix Ewert on drums and Nicholas Kincaid on bass, the duo shocked fans by deciding to split up in 2016 at the height of their success. The sheer intensity of their rapid rise to success in Denmark was later cited by the band as the reason for quitting. What was intended as a permanent break changed, however, after Oliver and Louis got together in late 2019 and decided to collaborate in the studio ”for old time’s sake”. During the Covid-19 lockdown, they spent time in a family cottage in the woods and re-kindled a creative chemistry that lead to the writing of new material. Julias Moon officially relaunched the band on October 9, 2020 with a new single ”Drive”. The group is currently signed to the record label Copenhagen Records, distributed by Universal Music.

== History ==
The group debuted with their single "Bay" in October 2013 where it was picked as "Ugens Uundgåelige" at the Danish radio station P3. The same single was later nominated at P3's annual award show for the listener hit of the year and the Talent Award.

In March 2014 the single "Lipstick Lies" was released. It fared well on the airplay charts and was featured on MTV Holland and Belgium. The group played shows all over Denmark the following summer.

In October 2014 their third and latest single "Palace" was released followed on November 7 by their EP "Fake ID Heartbreak".

== Members ==
The duo consists of:

- Louis Samson – vocals and songwriting
- Oliver Kincaid – songwriting and production

The duo has performed with live musicians including:

The members are:

On stage, the duo has been joined by:

- Thorval Naur - keyboards, vocals
- Felix Ewert - drums
- Zac Celinder - bass, guitar, vocals (spring/summer 2016)
- Nicholas Kincaid - bass and keyboard (2016-)

== Discography ==
=== EPs ===
Year	Single	Peak positions	Certification
Year	Single	DEN	Certification
2014	Fake ID Heartbreak	11	Gold

=== Singles ===
Year	Single	Peak positions	Certification	Album
Year	Single	DEN	Certification	Album
2013	"Bay"	23		Fake ID Heartbreak
2014	"Lipstick Lies"	7		Fake ID Heartbreak
2014	"Palace"	7		Fake ID Heartbreak
