= Morten Nørgaard =

- Born: Morten Bech Nørgaard; 4 October 1990 (age 35); Odder, Denmark
- Origin: Odder, Midtjylland, Denmark
- Genres: Pop
- Occupation: Singer
- Instrument: Vocals
- Years active: 2017–present

Morten Nørgaard (Born 4 October 1990), is a Danish singer who won the tenth season of the Danish version of the X Factor.

== Performances during X Factor ==
Episode	Theme	Song	Artist	Result
Audition	Free choice	"Bless the Broken Road"	Rascal Flatts	Through to 5 Chair Challenge
5 Chair Challenge	Free choice	"The Man Who Can't Be Moved"	The Script	Through to bootcamp
Bootcamp	Free choice	"Everything"	Michael Bublé	Through to live shows
Live show 1	Signature	"Hero"	Family of the Year	Safe (1st)
Live show 2	Songs from the judges' decades	"How Deep Is Your Love"	Bee Gees	Safe (2nd)
Live show 3	Break-up songs	"This Town"	Niall Horan	Safe (1st)
Live show 4	Crooners and Divas accompanied by DR Big Band	"Backwards"	Lars H.U.G. and Lisa Ekdahl	Safe (2nd)
Live show 5	International hits	"Say You Won't Let Go"	James Arthur	Safe (1st)
Live show 6 – Semi-final	Anniversary songs	"Mad World"	Michael Andrews & Gary Jules	Safe (1st)
Live show 6 – Semi-final	Viewers choice	"Dancing On My Own"	Robyn	Safe (1st)
Live show 7 – Final	Free choice	"Runnin' (Lose It All)"	Naughty Boy Feat Beyoncé & Arrow Benjamin	Safe (2nd)
Live show 7 – Final	Dallas Austin's Choice	"Pompeii"	Bastille	Safe (2nd)
Live show 7 – Final	Winner's single	"The Underdog"	Morten Nørgaard	Winner

== Discography ==
=== Singles ===
- "The Underdog" (2017)

=== EPs ===
- Cool Enough (2017)

Preceded by Embrace	X Factor (Denmark); Winner; 2017	Succeeded by Place on Earth
