= Fruit (album) =

Studio album by The Asteroids Galaxy Tour
- Released: September 21, 2009
- Recorded: 2008–2009
- Genre: Psychedelic pop
- Length: 47:24
- Label: Small Giants
- Producer: Lars Iversen

The Asteroids Galaxy Tour chronology
Fruit (2009)	Out of Frequency (2012)

Fruit is the debut album by Danish band The Asteroids Galaxy Tour. It was released on September 21, 2009, in Europe, and October 27, 2009, in the US. On November 29th, 2025 was released the deluxe edition on streaming including: A Hot Ice Remix of The Golden Age, the demo of Bad Fever, Attack of the Ghost Riders, a The Safety Dance cover, Runner and One Giant Freak for Mankind.

Professional ratings
Review scores
Source	Rating
Allmusic	3.5/5 stars
Hectic Eclectic	link

== Track listing ==
No.	Title	Composer(s)	Length
1.	"Lady Jesus"	Lars Iversen, Mette Lindberg	3:44
2.	"The Sun Ain't Shining No More"	Lars Iversen, Mette Lindberg	3:37
3.	"Push the Envelope"	Lars Iversen, Mette Lindberg	4:02
4.	"Satellite"	Lars Iversen, Mette Lindberg	3:37
5.	"Crazy"	Lars Iversen, Mette Lindberg	3:55
6.	"The Golden Age"	Lars Iversen, Mette Lindberg	3:50
7.	"Around the Bend"	Lars Iversen, Peter Iversen, Mette Lindberg	3:47
8.	"Sunshine Coolin'"	Lars Iversen, Mette Lindberg	3:07
9.	"Hero"	Lars Iversen, Mette Lindberg	4:11
10.	"Bad Fever"	Lars Iversen, Mette Lindberg	4:30
11.	"Inner City Blues (Bonus Track)"	Marvin Gaye, James Nyx Jr.	5:53

== Charts ==
Chart performance for Fruit
Chart (2009–2011)	Peak position
Austrian Albums (Ö3 Austria)	53
French Albums (SNEP)	80
Greek Albums (IFPI)	63
Swiss Albums (Schweizer Hitparade)	84
