= 2019 in Danish music =

The following is a list of notable events and releases of the year 2019 in Danish music.

== Events ==
=== May ===
- 29 – The 21st Distortion festival starts in Copenhagen (May 29 - June 2).

=== June ===
- 6 – The NorthSide Festival opens in Aarhus (June 6 - 8).
- 29 – The 48th Roskilde Festival opens (June 29 - July 5).

=== July ===
- 5 – The 41st Copenhagen Jazz Festival start in Copenhagen, Denmark (July 5 – 14).
- 13 – The 31st Aarhus Jazz Festival starts in Aarhus, Denmark (July 13 – 20).

== See also ==
- 2019 in Denmark
- Music of Denmark
- Denmark in the Eurovision Song Contest 2019
