= Emilie Esther =

Danish singer

- Born: Emilie Esther Holmgaard; 12 May 1999 (age 27); Aalborg, Denmark
- Origin: Denmark
- Genres: Pop
- Occupation: Singer
- Years active: 2015–present

Emilie Esther (born 12 May 1999) is a Danish singer who rose to fame as the winner of the eighth season of the Danish series of The X Factor. She competed in the age 15–22 category with Remee as her mentor. After she won, she was signed to Sony Music and her debut single "Undiscovered" topped the Danish Singles Chart. "Undiscovered" is written and composed by Karen Poole and Remee. Emilie Esther's second single, "Inescapable", is produced by RedOne and TinyIsland.

== Performances during X Factor ==
Episode	Theme	Song	Artist	Result
Audition	Free choice	"Make You Feel My Love"	Adele	Through to 5 Chair Challenge
5 Chair Challenge	Free choice	"Break Free"	Ariana Grande featuring Zedd	Through to bootcamp
Bootcamp	Free choice	"Radioactive"	Imagine Dragons	Through to live shows
Live show 1	Signature	"We Are Young"	Fun featuring Janelle Monáe	Safe
Live show 2	Grammy Nominated Hits	"Chandelier"	Sia	Safe
Live show 3	Contemporary hits	"Wild Eyes"/"Pompeii"	Broiler Featuring Ravvel / Bastille	Safe
Live show 4	Danish Hits	"Glimpse of a Time"	Broken Twin	Safe
Live show 5	Songs from Movies (accompanied by DR Bigband)	"Poker Face"	Lady Gaga	Safe
Live show 6 – Semi-final	Viewers choice	"Love Me like You Do" / "One Last Time"	Ellie Goulding / Ariana Grande	Safe
Live show 6 – Semi-final	Judges choice	"FourFiveSeconds"	Rihanna, Kanye West And Paul McCartney	Safe
Live show 7 – Final	Free choice	"Nature Boy" / "If I Were a Boy" / "Bitter Sweet Symphony"	Nat King Cole / Beyoncé / The Verve	Safe
Live show 7 – Final	Duet with guest artist	"Karma Town" with Stine Bramsen	Stine Bramsen	Safe
Live show 7 – Final	Winner's single	"Undiscovered"	Emilie Esther	Winner

== Discography ==
=== Singles ===
List of singles, with selected details and chart positions
Title	Year	Peak chart positions	Album
Title	Year	DEN	Album
"Undiscovered"	2015	6	Non-album single(s)
"Hey Love"	2015	—	Non-album single(s)
"Inescapable"	2015	—	Non-album single(s)
"—" denotes a recording that did not chart or was not released in that territory.

=== EPs ===
- Rare (2015)

Preceded by Anthony Jasmin	X Factor (Denmark); Winner; 2015	Succeeded by Embrace
