= Embrace (duo) =

Danish pop duo

KAPUTU
- Origin: Angola, Holstebro, Denmark
- Genres: Pop
- Years active: 2016-
- Members: Anilde Kaputu; Azilda Kaputu

KAPUTU, formerly known as Embrace and NEW:NAME, is a Danish sister duo consisting of Anilde and Azilda Kaputu. They became the winners of the ninth season of the Danish version of the X Factor. They received 60% of the public vote and became the second group to win the competition. After they won their winning single Commitment Issues was released on the Music Services. On 21 April, they changed their band name to NEW:NAME. On 20 May they released their debut EP, True Story.

== Performances during X Factor ==
Episode	Theme	Song	Artist	Result
Audition	Free choice	"See Through You"/"How to Be a Heartbreaker"	Azilda Kaputu/Marina and the Diamonds	Through to 5 Chair Challenge
5 Chair Challenge	Free choice	"Say My Name"	Destiny's Child	Through to bootcamp
Bootcamp	Free choice	"Who You Are"	Jessie J	Through to live shows
Live show 1	Signature	"You Don't Own Me"	Grace feat. G-Eazy	Safe (3rd)
Live show 2	Scandinavian songs	"Frit Land"	Ulige Numre	Safe (1st)
Live show 3	Songs from the contestant's birthyears	"Ready or Not"	Fugees	Safe (1st)
Live show 4	Radiohits	"Ain't Nobody (Loves Me Better)"	Felix Jaehn feat. Jasmine Thompson	Safe (2nd)
Live show 5	David Bowie songs	"Absolute Beginners"	David Bowie	Safe (1st)
Live show 6 - Semi-final	Viewers Choice	"Fast Car"	Tracy Chapman	Safe (1st)
Live show 6 - Semi-final	Audition songs	"See Through You"/"How to Be a Heartbreaker"	Azilda Kaputu/Marina and the Diamonds	Safe (1st)
Live show 7 - Final	Free Choice	"Like I'm Gonna Lose You"	Meghan Trainor feat. John Legend	Safe (1st)
Live show 7 - Final	Duet with guest artists	"Shackled Up" and "Casual" with Alex Vargas and Scarlet Pleasure	Alex Vargas/Scarlet Pleasure	Safe (1st)
Live show 7 - Final	Winner's single	"Commitment Issues"	Embrace	Winners

== Discography ==
=== Singles ===
- "Commitment Issues" (2016)
- "Don’t You Wait" (2016)
- "Hvor du går" (2017)
- "Better Off" (2020)

=== EPs ===
- True Story (2016)

Preceded by Emilie Esther	X Factor (Denmark); Winner; 2016	Succeeded by Morten Nørgaard
