= 1982 in Danish television =

List of years in Danish television
- … 1972; 1973; 1974; 1975; 1976; 1977; 1978; 1979; 1980; 1981; 1982; 1983; 1984; 1985; 1986; 1987; 1988; 1989; 1990; 1991; 1992 …
- Art; Archaeology; Architecture; Literature; Music; Philosophy; Science; +...

This is a list of Danish television related events from 1982.

== Events ==
- 13 March – Brixx are selected to represent Denmark at the 1982 Eurovision Song Contest with their song "Video, Video". They are selected to be the fifteenth Danish Eurovision entry during Dansk Melodi Grand Prix held at the DR Studios in Copenhagen.

== Ending this year ==
- Matador

== Births ==
- 26 January – Christiane Schaumburg-Müller, actress & TV host
- 2 March – Pilou Asbæk, actor.
- 26 July – Saseline Sørensen, Malaysian-born singer-songwriter, model & TV host

== Deaths ==
Date	Name	Age	Cinematic Credibility
11 May	Sejr Volmer-Sørensen	68	Danish lyricist, actor, director & television host

== See also ==
- 1982 in Denmark
