= 2017 in Danish television =

List of years in Danish television
- … 2007; 2008; 2009; 2010; 2011; 2012; 2013; 2014; 2015; 2016; 2017; 2018; 2019; 2020; 2021; 2022; 2023; 2024; 2025; 2026; 2027 …
- Art; Archaeology; Architecture; Literature; Music; Philosophy; Science; +...

This is a list of Danish television related events from 2017.

== Television shows ==
=== 1990s ===
- Hvem vil være millionær? (1999–present)

=== 2000s ===
- Vild med dans (2005–present)
- X Factor (2008–present)

=== 2010s ===
- Voice – Danmarks største stemme (2011–present)
- The Bridge (2011–present)
- Danmark har talent (2014–present)

== Channels ==
Launches:

- 1 January: C More Live
- 31 October: TV3 Max

Closures:

- 1 January: C More Tennis
- 1 June: Turner Classic Movies
- 31 October: TV3 Sport 2

== See also ==
- 2017 in Denmark
