= 2014 in Denmark =

- Decades: 1990s; 2000s; 2010s; 2020s
- See also: Other events of 2014; List of years in Denmark

Events from the year 2014 in Denmark.

== Incumbents ==
- Monarch – Margrethe II
- Prime minister – Helle Thorning Schmidt

== Events ==
=== January ===
- 9 January – Margrethe Schanne, ballet dancer (born 1921)
- 30 January – The Socialist People's Party departs Prime Minister Helle Thorning-Schmidt's government due to a conflict over the proposed sale of DONG Energy shares to Goldman Sachs.

=== May ===
- 6–10 May – Copenhagen hosts the 2014 Eurovision Song Contest, which is won by Austria.
- 25 May – The European Parliament election was held.
- 26 to 28 May – Wellbeing at Work conference is held at Copenhagen.

=== August ===
- 1–8 August – Crown Prince Frederik, Crown Princess Mary and their children pay an official visit to Greenland.

== Culture ==
=== Architecture ===
- 7 March – C. F. Møller Architects' refurbishment of Aalborg Waterfront, Henning Larsen Architects' Roskilde Campus and Vartorv Square in Copenhagen receive Civic Trust Awards.
- 15 May – BIG's Danish Maritime Museum and underground multi-purpose hall for Gammel Hellerup Gymnasium receive Architizer A+ Awards at a ceremony in New York City.
- 19 November – Lene Tranberg receives the Prince Eugen Medal in Stockholm.
- 19 November – Lene Tranberg receives the Prince Eugen Medal in Stockholm.

=== Film ===
- 16 January – The Hunt is nominated in the category Best Foreign Language Film at the 86th Academy Awards.
- 2 March – Danish short film Helium wins the award of Best Live Action Short Film at the 86th Academy Awards.

=== Literature ===
- 23 January – Anne-Cathrine Riebnitzsky receives De Gyldne Laurbær for her novel, Forbandede yngel.

=== Music ===
- 8 March – Basim wins Dansk Melodi Grand Prix 2014 and represents Denmark in the Eurovision Song Contest 2014 on 10 May with the song "Cliche Love Song".

== Sport ==
=== Badminton ===
- 7–12 January – Mathias Boe and Carsten Mogensen win gold in Men's Double at the 2014 Korea Open Super Series.
- 16 March – Viktor Axelsen wins gold in Men's Single at Swiss Open Grand Prix.
- 23–27 April – With three gold medals, four silver medals and three bronze medals, Denmark finishes as the best nation at the 2014 European Badminton Championships.
- 25–31 August – Denmark wins three bronze medals at the 2014 BWF World Championships.
- 26 October – Mathias Boe and Carsten Mogensen win gold in Men's Double at the 2014 French Super Series.

=== Cycling ===
- 4 February – Robert Bartko (GER) and Marcel Kalz (GER) win the Six Days of Copenhagen six-day track cycling race.

=== Equestrian sports ===
- 23 August Denmark wins two bronze medals at the 2014 FEI World Equestrian Games.

=== Gol ===
- 26 October – Thorbjørn Olesen wins Perth International on the 2014 European Tour.

=== Handball ===
- 12–26 January – Denmark hosts the 2014 European Men's Handball Championship.

=== Motorsports ===
- 2 August – Denmark wins the 2014 Speedway World Cup.

=== Sailing ===
- 21 September
  - Jonas Warrer and Anders Thomsen win silver in 49er at the 2014 ISAF Sailing World Championships.
  - Ida Marie Baad Nielsen and Marie Thusgaard Olsen win silver in 49er FX.

=== Swimming ===
- 13–24 August – 2014 European Aquatics Championships
  - 18 August – Jeanette Ottesen wins a silver medal in Women's 50 metre butterfly.
  - 20 August – Rikke Møller Pedersen wins a gold medal in Women's 100 metre breaststroke.
  - 21 August Viktor Bromer wins a gold medal in Men's 200 metre butterfly.
  - 21 August – Mie Nielsen wins a gold medal in Women's 100 metre backstroke.
  - 22 August – Jeanette Ottesen wins a gold medal in Women's 100 metre butterfly.
  - 22 August – Rikke Møller Pedersen wins a gold medal in Women's 200 metre breaststroke.
  - 23 August – Mie Nielsen wins a bronze medal in Women's 50 metre backstroke.
  - 24 August – Jeanette Ottesen wins a bronze medal in Women's 50 metre freestyle.
  - 24 August – Denmark wins a gold medal in Women's 4 × 100 metre medley relay.

=== Other ===
- 6–10 August – Denmark wins two gold medals and one bronze medal at the 2014 ICF Canoe Sprint World Championships.

== Deaths ==
=== January–March ===
- 2 January – Countess Anne Dorte of Rosenborg, member of the extended Danish royal family (born 1947)
- 9 January – Margrethe Schanne, ballerina (born 1921)
- 5 January – Mogens E. Pedersen, journalist (born 1928)
- 9 February – Gabriel Axel, film director, actor, writer and producer (born 1918)
- 13 February – Richard Møller Nielsen, football player and manager (born 1937)
- 13 March – Kay Werner Nielsen, cyclist (born 1921)
- 15 March – Jesper Langballe, Lutheran priest and politician (born 1939)

=== April–June ===
- 5 April – Poul Erik Bech, football manager (born 1938)
- 20 May – Jørn Ege, controversial doctor (born 1955)
- 30 May – Henning Carlsen, film director, screenwriter and producer (born 1927)

=== July–September ===
- 5 July – Søsser Krag, daughter of actress Helle Virkner and former prime minister Jens Otto Krag, journalist and former model (born 1962)
- 12 September – Henrik Have, author and artist (born 1946)
- 20 September – Erik Ninn-Hansen, politician (born 1922)
- 130 September – Erik Hansen, canoeist (born 1939)

=== October–December ===
- 13 October – Jess Ingerslev, actor (born 1947)
- 26 October – Count Claus Ahlefeldt-Laurvig-Bille, aristocrat and author (born 1932)
- 6 November – William Rosenberg, actor (born 1920)
- 11 November – Jan Lindhardt, theologian and writer (born 1938)
- 22 December – Vera Gebuhr, actress (born 1916)

== See also ==
- 2014 in Danish television
