= 1991 in Denmark =

- Decades: 1970s; 1980s; 1990s; 2000s; 2010s
- See also: Other events of 1991; List of years in Denmark

Events from the year 1991 in Denmark.

== Incumbents ==
- Monarch – Margrethe II
- Prime minister – Poul Schlüter

== Sports ==
=== Badminton ===
- 2–8 May The 1991 IBF World Championships takes place in Copenhagen.
  - Denmark wins one silver medal and two bronze medals.

=== Cycling ===
- 23 March – Rolf Sørensen comes in second in the Milan–San Remo road cycling race in Italy.
- 7 April – Rolf Sørensen comes in 3rd in the Tour of Flanders.
- April 21 – Rolf Sørensen comes in 3rd in the Liège–Bastogne–Liège road cycling race.
- September – Brian Holm wins the Paris–Brussels road cycling race.
- Danny Clark (AUS) and Jens Veggerby (DEN) win the Six Days of Copenhagen six-day track cycling race.

=== Swimming ===
- 18–25 August – Denmark wins four gold medals and two bronze medals at the 1991 European Aquatics Championships.

=== Other ===
- 31 August – Jan O. Pedersen wins the 1991 Individual Speedway World Championship.
- 28 October – 3 November – Denmark wins two gold medals and one silver medal at the 1991 World Taekwondo Championships.

== Births ==
=== January–March ===
- 9 January – Søren Hess-Olesen, tennis player
- 15 January – Nicolai Jørgensen, footballer

=== April–June ===
- 3 April – TopGunn, rapper
- 22 May – Mike Hawkins, Musical artist
- 5 June – Martin Braithwaite, footballer
- 7 June – Rasmus Vestergaard Madsen, politician
- 20 June – Rasmus Lauge, handballer

=== July–September ===
- 9 July – Bashkim Kadrii, footballer
- 3 September – Thomas Delaney, footballer
- 29 September – Martin Jensen, DJ and producer

=== October–December ===
- 4 October
  - Nicolai Kielstrup, singer
- 16 October – Jacob Mark, politician
  - Erik Sviatchenko, footballer
- 17 October – Alex Vanopslagh, politician

== Deaths ==
- 12 March – William Heinesen, poet, writer, composer and painter from the Faroe Islands (born 1900)
- 8 August – Ada Bruhn Hoffmeyer, medieval weapons expert (born 1910)
- 16 October – Ole Beich, musician
- 4 December – Ole Sarvig, poet (born 1921)

== See also ==
- 1991 in Danish television
