= 2013 in Danish television =

This is a list of Danish television related events from 2013.

== Events ==
- 22 March – Chresten Falck Damborg wins the sixth season of X Factor.
- 16 May – Bjørn Clausen wins the fifth season of Big Brother.
- 18 May – Denmark wins the 58th Eurovision Song Contest in Malmö, Sweden. The winning song is "Only Teardrops", performed by Emmelie de Forest.
- 29 November – Table tennis player Mie Skov and her partner Mads Vad win the tenth season of Vild med dans.

== Television shows ==
=== 1990s ===
- Hvem vil være millionær? (1999–present)

=== 2000s ===
- Big Brother (2001–2005, 2012–2014)
- Vild med dans (2005–present)
- X Factor (2008–present)

=== 2010s ===
- Voice – Danmarks største stemme (2011–present)

== Channels ==
Launches:

- 1 January: 7'eren
- 7 January: TV3 Sport
- 5 February: TV3 Sport 2
- 4 March: DR Ultra
- 5 May: TV 2 Fri

Closures:

- 7 January: TV 2 Sport HD
- 4 March: DR Update
- 3 July: Roj TV

== See also ==
- 2013 in Denmark
