= 2017 in Denmark =

- Decades: 1990s; 2000s; 2010s; 2020s
- See also: Other events of 2017; List of years in Denmark

The following events occurred in Denmark in the year 2017.

== Incumbents ==
- Monarch – Margrethe II
- Prime Minister – Lars Løkke Rasmussen

== Events ==
- 20 March – Denmark makes the last payment on a $1.5 billion loan and thus becomes free of national debt in foreign currencies for the first time since 1834.
- 21 November – scheduled date for the 2017 Danish local elections

== Culture ==
=== Architecture ===
- 21 November – The Mærsk Tower wins the QAF Award in the Higher Education & Research - Completed Buildings category at the World Architecture Festival.

=== Film ===
- 9 December – Claes Bang wins the award for Best Actor at the 30th European Film Awards.

=== Music ===
- 3 December – The Fairest of Roses by Frederik Magle is premiered in Saint Paul's Church in Copenhagen on the occasion of the church's 140-years jubilee and rededication of the church tower.

== Sports ==
=== Badminton ===
- 17 February – Denmark wins the 2017 European Mixed Team Badminton Championships by defeating Russia 3–0 in the final.
- 3–8 March – Mathias Boe and Carsten Mogensen wins gold in Men's Double at 2015 All England Super Series Premier.
- 28 March-2 April – Viktor Axelsen wins Men's Single at 2017 India Open.
- 25–30 April – With two gold medals, three silver medals and five bronze medals, Denmark finishes as the best nation at the 2017 European Badminton Championships.
- 27 August – Viktor Axelsen wins gold in men's single at the 2017 BWF World Championships.
- 12–17 September – Mathias Boe and Carsten Mogensen win gold in Men's Double at the 2017 Korea Open Super Series.

=== Cycling ===
- 31 January – Lasse Norman Hansen (DEN) and Michael Mørkøv (DEN) win the Six Days of Copenhagen six-day track cycling race.
- 11 June – Jakob Fuglsang wins the Critérium du Dauphiné.
- 2–6 August – 2017 European Road Championships takes place in Herning.
- 17–24 September – With two gold medals, one silver medal and two bronze medals, Denmark finishes as the third best nation at the 2017 UCI Road World Championships in Norway.

=== Equestrian sports ===
- 21–27 August – Denmark wins two gold medals, two silver medals and four bronze medals at the 2017 FEI European Championships.

=== Football ===
- 14 November – Denmark qualifies for the 2018 FIFA World Cup by defeating Ireland 5–1 in the second leg of the play-off round of the 2018 FIFA World Cup qualification after playing 0–0 in the first match.
- 7 December – F.C. Copenhagen qualifies for the round of 16 in the 2017–18 UEFA Europa League by defeating FC Sheriff Tiraspol in Group F.

=== Golf ===
- 7 May – Lucas Bjerregaard and Thorbjørn Olesen win GolfSixes.
- 24 September – Lucas Bjerregaard wins the Portugal Masters.

=== Swimming ===
- 13–17 December – The 2017 European Short Course Swimming Championships rakes place in Royal Arena in Copenhagen.

=== Other ===
- 30 June - 7 July – Maja Alm wins a gold medal in Women's sprint and a silver medal in Women's long distance and Denmark wins a silver medal in Sprint relay at the 2017 World Orienteering Championships.

== Deaths ==
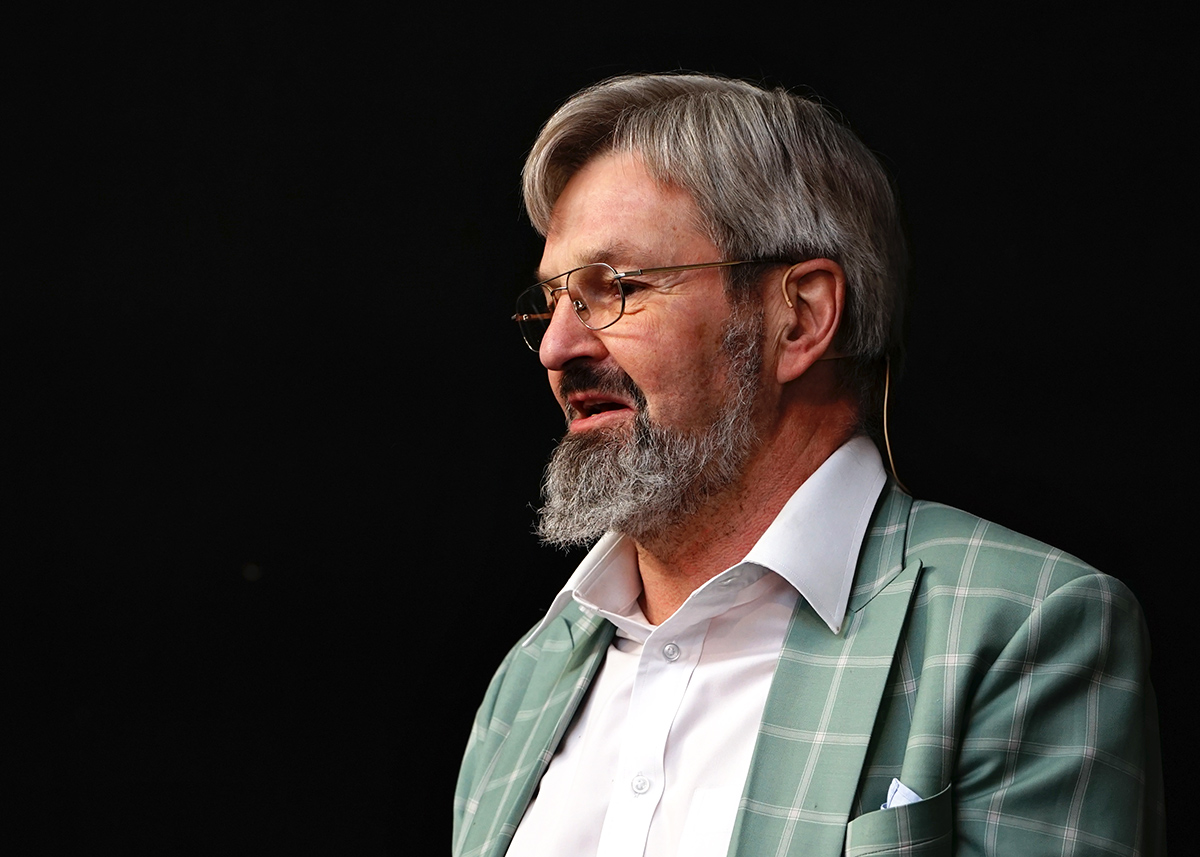
Erland Kolding Nielsen

- 20 January – Bruno Amoroso, economist (born 1936)
- 23 January – Erland Kolding Nielsen, Director General and CEO of The Danish Royal Library (born 1947)
- 26 January – Preben Dabelsteen, badminton player (born 1925)
- 7 February – Svend Asmussen, jazz musician (born 1916)
- 13 February – Aage Birch, competitive sailor and Olympic silver medalist (born 1926)
- 17 February – Erland Kops, badminton player (born 1937)
- 13 May – Vibeke Sperling, journalist (born 1945)
- 3 June – Niels Helveg Petersen, politician (born 1939)
- 4 December
  - Thor Munkager, handballer (born 1951)
  - Henning Jensen, footballer (born 1947)

== See also ==
- 2017 in Danish television
