= 1989 in Denmark =

- Decades: 1960s; 1970s; 1980s; 1990s; 2000s
- See also: Other events of 1989; List of years in Denmark

Events from the year 1989 in Denmark.

== Incumbents ==
- Monarch – Margrethe II
- Prime minister - Poul Schlüter

== Events ==
- 26 August – Munkeruphus north of Copenhagen opens its doors to its first exhibition as an exhibition space.
- 8 September – Partnair Flight 394 crashes into the North Sea of the Danish coast, killing all 55 people on board.
- 1 October – Denmark becomes the first country in the world to legalise civil partnerships for same-sex couples.
- Full date unknown:
  - Tools Design, a consumer products and furniture design studio is founded.

== Culture ==
=== Film ===
- 28 January – Both Pelle the Conqueror and Babette's Feast art nominated for Best Foreign Language Film at the 46th Golden Globe Awards and Pelle the Conqueror wins the award.

== Sport ==
- 15– Mette Jacobsen wins two bronze medals in Women's 200 metre freestyle and Women's 200 metre butterfly at the 1989 European Aquatics Championships.

=== Cycling ===
- Danny Clark (AUS) and Urs Freuler (SUI) win the Six Days of Copenhagen six-day track cycling race.
- Danny Clark (AUS) and Jens Veggerby (DEN) win the Six Days of Copenhagen six-day track cycling race.

== Births ==
=== January–March ===
- 9 January – Rikke Møller Pedersenm swimmer
- 14 January – Lærke Møller, handball player
- 26 January – Kristoffer Hjort Storm, politician
- 26 March – Simon Kjær, football player

=== April–June ===
- 8 May – Lars Eller, ice hockey player
- 31 May – Daniel Wass, footballer

=== July–September ===
- 7 August – Søren Frederiksen, footballer
- 7 September – Alban Lendorf, ballet dancer

=== October–December ===
- 2 October – Frederik Andersen, ice hockey player
- 29 October – Maria Sten, actress
- 14 December – Casper Ulrich Mortensen, handballer
- 21 December – Thorbjørn Olesen, golfer

== Deaths ==
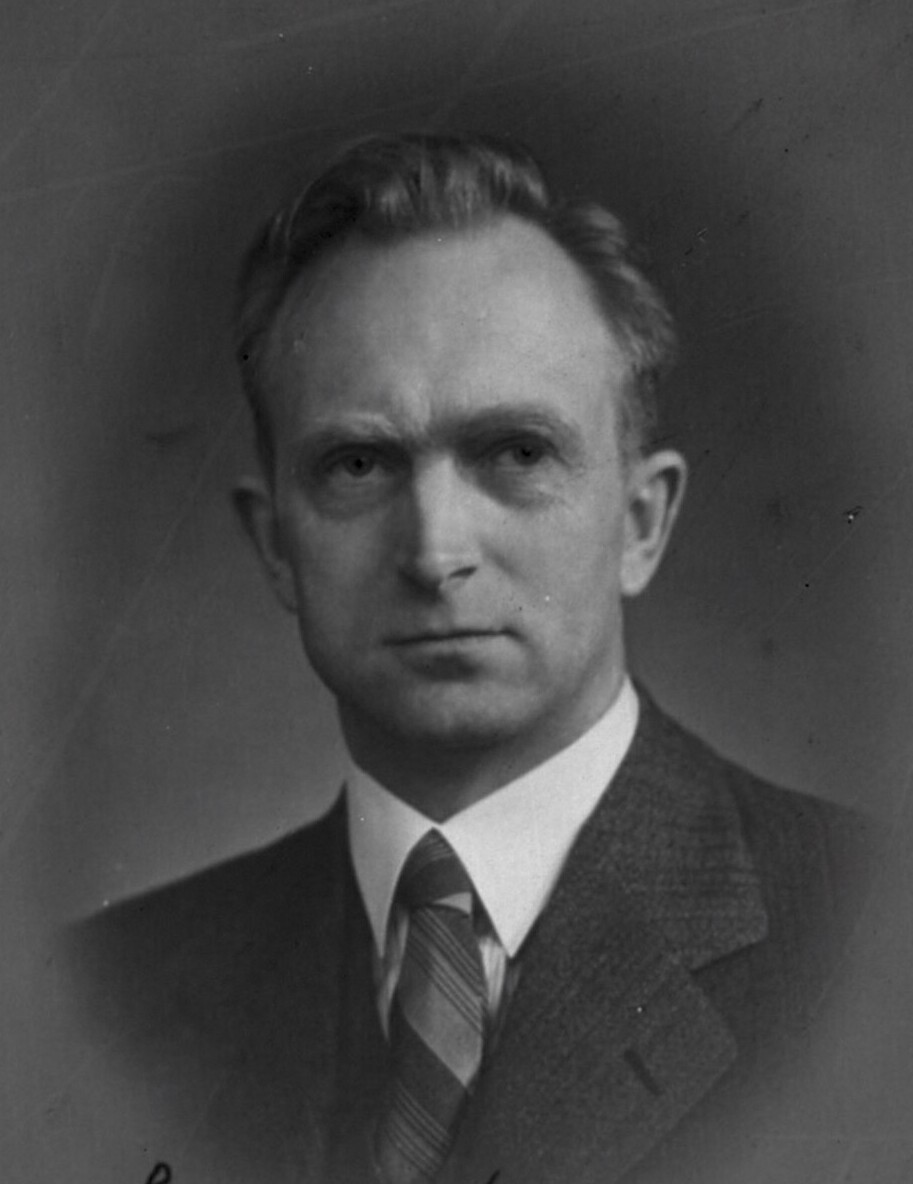
Thorkil Kristensen.

=== January–March ===
- 22 January – Ellen Andersen, textile artist (born 1908)
- 3 February – Ebbe Langberg, actor (born 1933)
- 4 February – Thorkild Hansen, author (born 1927)

=== April–June ===
- 5 April – Hans Lunding, military officer and member of the resistance movement (born 1899)
- 29 April – Else Schøtt, operatic soprano (born 1895)
- 17 May – Finn Juhl, architect and designer (born 1912)
- 26 June – Thorkil Kristensen, politician (born 1899)

=== July–August ===
- 2 July – Hilmar Baunsgaard, politician, former Danish prime minister (born 1920)
- 30 July – Lily Broberg, actress (born 1923)

=== October–December ===
- 27 October – Kjeld Philip, politician (born 1912)

== See also ==
- 1989 in Danish television
