= 2011 in Denmark =

- Decades: 1990s; 2000s; 2010s; 2020s
- See also: Other events of 2011; List of years in Denmark

Events from the year 2011 in Denmark.

== Incumbents ==
- Monarch – Margrethe II
- Prime minister – Lars Løkke Rasmussen (until 3 October), Helle Thorning Schmidt

== Events ==
=== January ===
- 10 January – Denmark and Serbia signs a defense agreement.
- 13 January – Lene Espersen, party leader of the Danish Conservative Party, announces her resignation from the post after a period of intense criticism in the media and from fellow party members.
- 14 January – Lars Barfoed is elected as new political leader of the Conservative party.
- 19 January – Denmark starts the trial against the Somali man who attacked Kurt Westergaard.

=== February ===
- 24 February – A Danish family is kidnapped from their private yacht off the coast of Somalia by Somali pirates.

=== March ===
- 13 March – By unanimous vote, Denmark's Parliament authorized direct military action by its air force to help enforce UN Security Council Resolution 1973, marking the only time so far in the state's history that military commitment was supported by full parliamentary unity. The Royal Danish Air Force is participating with six F-16AM fighters, one C-130J-30 Super Hercules military transport plane and the corresponding ground crews. Only four F-16s will be used for offensive operations, while the remaining two will act as reserves. The first airstrikes from Danish aircraft were carried out on 23 March with four aircraft making twelve sorties as part of Operation Odyssey Dawn. The Guardian reported in May 2011, that Danish F-16 fighters killed Muammar Gaddafi's son Saif al-Arab Gaddafi.

=== April–June ===
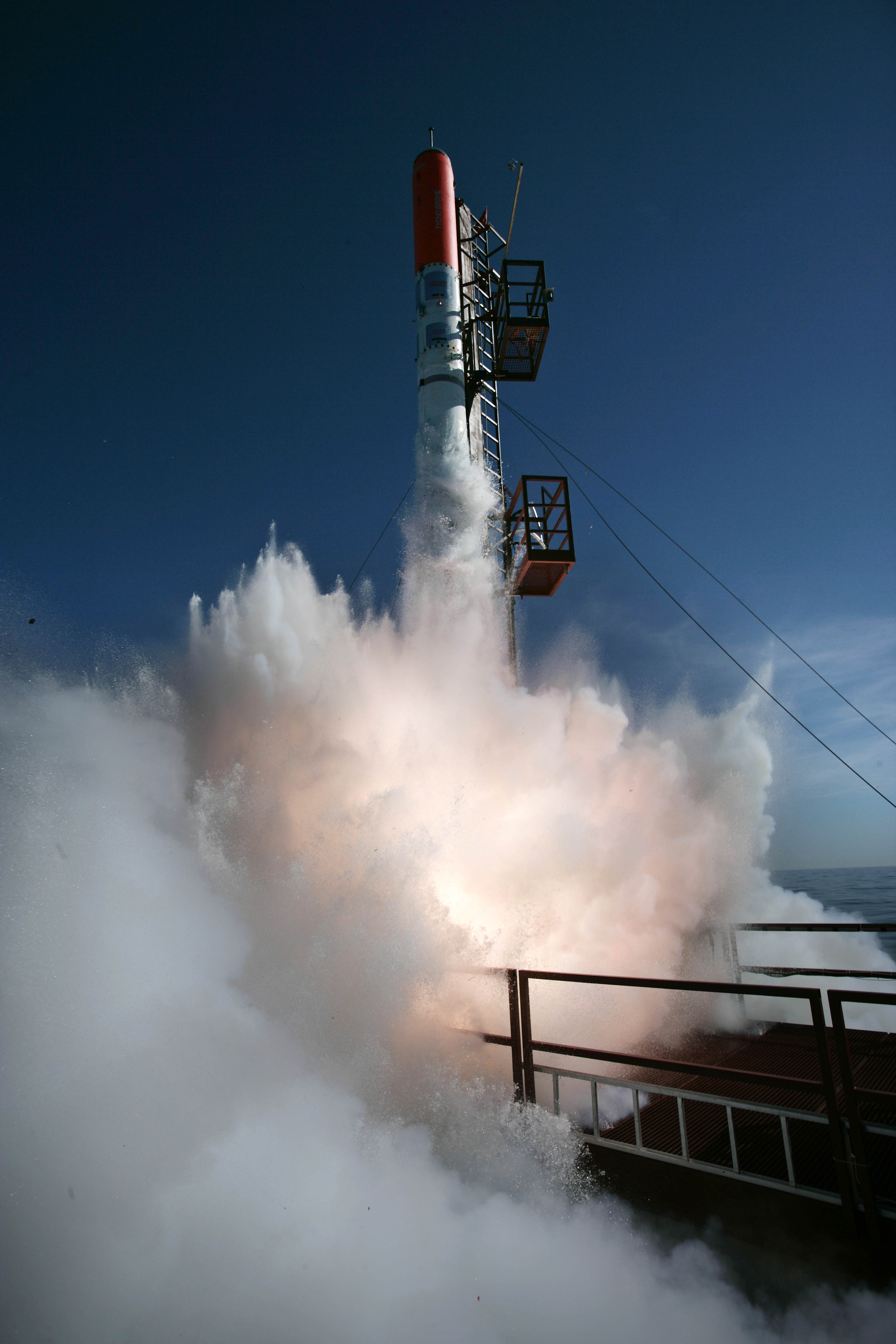
Copenhagen Suborbitals' rocket launch on 3 June

- 14 April – Crown Prince Frederik and Crown Princess Mary's twins are baptised at a ceremony in the Church of Holmen in Copenhagen and given the names Vincent Frederik Minik Alexander and Josephine Sophia Ivalo Mathilda.
- 26 April – Bo Lidegaard is appointed as new editor-in-chief of the newspaper Politiken.
- 16 May – Bella Sky Hotel is inaugurated in Ørestad, Copenhagen. With 814 rooms, it becomes the largest hotel in Scandinavia.
- 28 May – Olafur Eliasson's artwork Your Rainbow on the top of the ARoS Museum of Art in Aarhus is inaugurated.
- 31 May – Lors Doukaiev, the would-be bomber from the Hotel Jørgensen explosion, is sentenced to 12 years imprisonment for last September's failed plan to send a letter bomb to Jyllands-Posten.
- 3 June – Copenhagen Suborbitals, a private non-profit rocket group, makes their first successful full-scale test-launch of the HEAT 1X rocket from a self-built ramp off the coast of Bornholm.
- 22 June – Denmark recognises the National Transitional Council as the only legitimate representation of Libya.

=== July–September ===
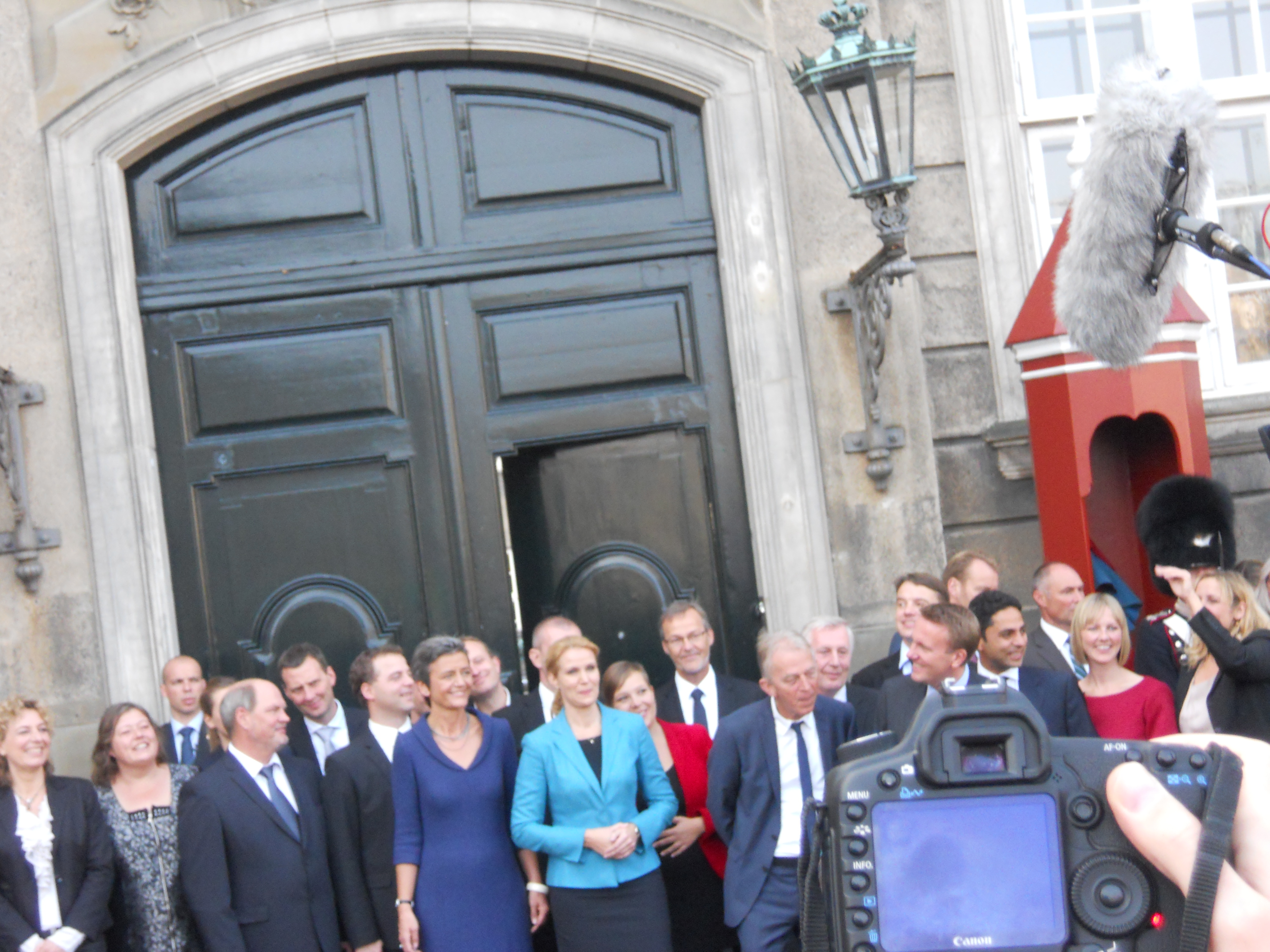
Presentation of the new government on 3 October

- 2 July – A cloudburst hit parts of Zealand and the Greater Copenhagen area.
- 15 September – The 2011 Danish parliamentary election is held and leads to a majority for the opposition parties
- 28 September – The 73-year-old listed K.B. Hallen event venue in Copenhagen is devastated by fire.

=== October–December ===
- 3 October – The Cabinet of Helle Thorning-Schmidt is presented at Amalienborg Palace and Helle Thorning-Schmidt takes office as the first ever female PM of Denmark.

== Culture ==
=== Architecture ===
- 7 March – Henning Larsen Architects' The Wave in Vejle and C. F. Møller Architects' Darwin Center phase II extension of the Natural History Museum in London are among the winners of 2011 Civic Trust Awards.
- 19 May – Danish architecture firms receive three out of eight RIBA European Awards when the Royal Institute of British Architects announces the annual RIBA Award winners. Two of the awards go to Lundgaard & Tranberg and one goes to 3XN.

=== Film ===
- 16 January – Susanne Bier's In a Better World (Hævnen) wins the 2011 Golden Globe Award for Best Foreign Language Film.
- 20 February – The 64th Bodil Awards are held at the Bremen Theatre in Copenhagen. R wins the awards for Best Danish Film.
- 27 February – Susanne Bier's In a Better World also wins an Oscar for Best Foreign Language Film at the 83rd Academy Awards.
- 20 May – Nicolas Winding Refn wins the Best Director Award at the Cannes Film Festival.
- 3 December – At the 24th European Film Awards, Denmark tops the list of countries with most nominations with 14 and wins several of the most prestigious awards:
  - Best Film: Melancholia by Lars von Trier
  - Best Director: Susanne Bier (In a Better World)
  - European Achievement in World Cinema: Mads Mikkelsen
  - Best Cinematographer. Manuel Alberto Claro (Melancholia)
  - Best Production Designer: Jette Lehmann ( Melancholia)
- 31 December – Danish films sold 3.4 million tickets at the box office in Denmark in 2011, or 27% of the total ticket sale, with A Funny Man as the best selling Danish film on the home market with 471,819 admissions.

=== Gastronomy ===
- 26 January – Danish chef Rasmus Kofoed wins the Bocuse d'Or competition.
- 16 March – René Redzepi's restaurant Noma in Copenhagen's Christianshavn neighbourhood is ranked as the best restaurant in the world for the second year in a row on the magazine Restaurants list of the World's 50 Best Restaurants.

=== Music ===
See 2011 in Scandinavian music

== Sports ==
=== Badminton ===
- 20 February – Denmark wins gold at the 2011 European Mixed Team Badminton Championships by defeating Germany 3–1 in the final.
- 8–13 March – Mathias Boe and Carsten Mogensen wins gold in Men's Double at the 2011 All England Super Series Premier.
- 14 August – Peter Gade wins a bronze medal in men's single at the 2011 BWF World Championships.

=== Cycling ===
- Date unknown – Michael Mørkøv (DEN) and Alex Rasmussen (DEN) win the Six Days of Copenhagen six-day track cycling race for the third year in a row.
- 3 June – Alex Rasmussen wins the 27th Philadelphia International Championship, the longest and most prestigious single day race in the United States.
- 19–25 September – The 2011 UCI Road World Championships are held in Copenhagen.

=== Football ===
- 22 May – For the second year in a row, FC Nordsjælland wins the Danish Cup by defeating FC Midtjylland in the final.

=== Golf ===
- 5 February – Thomas Bjørn wins Qatar Masters on the 2011 European Tour.
- 28 August – Thomas Bjørn wins Johnnie Walker Championship at Gleneagles and becomes Golfer of the Month in August.
- 4 September – Thomas Bjørn wins Omega European Masters on the 2009 European Tour.

=== Handball ===
- 30 January – Denmark win silver at the 2011 World Men's Handball Championship after being defeated 37–35 by France in final.

=== Motorsports ===
- 29 May – Nicki Sørensen finishes 2nd in the 2011 Bayern-Rundfahrt.

=== Sailing ===
- 11 December – Emil Toft Nielsen and Simon Toft Nielsen win a bronze medal in 49er at the 2011 ISAF Sailing World Championships.

=== Swimming ===
- 8 December—11 – With five gold medals, seven silver medals and two bronze medals, Denmark finishes as the second best country at the 2011 European Short Course Swimming Championships.

== Births ==
- 8 January
  - Prince Vincent, prince of Denmark
  - Princess Josephine, princess of Denmark

== Deaths ==
=== January–March ===
- 1 January - Flemming Bamse Jørgensen, singer and actor (born 1947)
- 23 January – Poul Volther, furniture designer (born 1923)
- 27 January – Tøger Seidenfaden, journalist, editor-in-chief of Politiken (born 1957)
- 2 March – Erling Kroner, jazz trombonist, composer and bandleader (born 1943)
- 9 March – Inge Sørensen, swimmer (born 1924)

=== April–June ===
- 6 April – Thøger Birkeland, author (born 1922)
- 11 June - Kurt Nielsen, tennis player (born 1930)
- 27 June - Erling Olsen, politician (born 1927)

=== July–September ===
- 13 August - Ellen Winther, opera singer and actress (born 1933)
- 22 August – Jesper Klein, actor (born 1944)
- 5 September – Jørgen Hviid, sportsman (born 1916)
- 9 September - Esben Høilund Carlsen, film producer and director of Norsk Film
- 11 September – Christian Bakkerud, racing driver (born 1984)
- 27 September – Erik Wedersøe, actor (born 1938)

=== October–December ===
- 17 October - Poul Glargaard, actor (born 1942)
- 24 October - Margit Brandt, fashion designer (born 1945)
- 2 November - Papa Bue, jazz trombonist and bandleader (born 1930)
- 7 November - Lisbeth Movin, stage and film actress (born 1917)
- 19 November - Karl Aage Præst, footballer (born 1922)
- 1 December - Ragnhild Hveger, swimmer (born 1920)

== See also ==
- 2011 in Danish television
