= 2012 in Danish television =

This is a list of Danish television related events from 2012.

== Events ==
- 25 February - Kim Wagner wins the first season of the Voice – Danmarks største stemme.
- 23 March - Ida Østergaard Madsen wins the fifth season of X Factor.
- 13 May - Amanda Heisel wins the fourth season of Big Brother.
- 9 November - TV host Joakim Ingversen and his partner Claudia Rex win the ninth season of Vild med dans.
- 24 November - Emilie Paevatalu wins the second season of Voice – Danmarks største stemme.

== Debuts ==
- January 30 - Big Brother (2001-2005, 2012-2014)

== Television shows ==
=== 1990s ===
- Hvem vil være millionær? (1999–present)

=== 2000s ===
- Vild med dans (2005–present)
- X Factor (2008–present)

=== 2010s ===
- Voice – Danmarks største stemme (2011–present)

== Channels ==
Conversions and rebrandings:

- Unknown: Canal+ First to C More First
- Unknown: Canal+ Family to C More Kids
- Unknown: Canal+ Hockey to C More Hockey
- Unknown: Canal+ Series to C More Series
- 3 March: TV1000 to Viasat Film
- 3 March: TV1000 Drama to Viasat Film Drama
- 13 August: Canal+ Sport 1 to Canal 8 Sport
- 4 September: Canal+ Hits to C More Hits
- 4 September: Canal+ Sport 2 to C More Tennis

== Deaths ==
Date	Name	Age	Cinematic Credibility
1 January	Anders Frandsen	52	Danish singer, actor & TV host

== See also ==
- 2012 in Denmark
