= Aalborg Charter =

European urban sustainability initiative

The Charter of European Sustainable Cities and Towns Towards Sustainability otherwise known as the Aalborg Charter (1994) is an urban environment sustainability initiative approved by the participants at the first European Conference on Sustainable Cities & Towns in Aalborg, Denmark. It is inspired by the Rio Earth Summit’s Local Agenda 21 plan, and was developed to contribute to the European Union’s Environmental Action Programme, ‘Towards Sustainability’.

The Charter is based on the consensus of individuals, municipalities, NGOs, national and international organisations, and scientific bodies.

Approximately 2700 local authorities from more than 40 countries have signed the Charter. This has resulted in the largest European movement of its type.

There are three related parts to the Charter. Part 1 is a consensus declaration of European sustainable cities and towns towards sustainability. Part 2 relates to the creation of the European Sustainable Cities & Towns Campaign. Part 3 is declaration of intent that local governments will seek to engage in Local Agenda 21 processes.

== The Aalborg Commitments ==
Ten years after the release of the Aalborg Charter, the 4th European Conference on Sustainable Cities & Towns was again held in Aalborg (2004).

The purpose of the event was to develop a common understanding of sustainability, and as a consequence to develop a framework to be used at the local level that would better articulate how to embed sustainability across municipality sectors. By consensus of participants, including organisations such as Association of Cities and Regions for Recycling (ACRR); Climate Alliance -Klima-Bündnis -Alianza del Climae.V; Council of European Municipalities & Regions (CEMR); Energie Cités; EUROCITIES; ICLEI Local Governments for Sustainability; Medcities; Union of Baltic Cities (UBC), and the World Health Organization (WHO) - Healthy Cities, the Aalborg Commitments were agreed on and have so far been signed by more than 700 mayors from across Europe.

The Commitments are:

1. Governance
2. Urban management
3. Natural common goods
4. Responsible consumption
5. Planning and design
6. Better mobility
7. Local action for health
8. Sustainable local economy
9. Social equity and justice
10. Local to global
