= 1994 in Danish television =

This is a list of Danish television related events from 1994.

== Channels ==
Launches:

- Unknown: Viasat Nature
- 3 May: TV6

== Births ==
- 8 August - Mathias Käki Jørgensen, actor

== See also ==
- 1994 in Denmark
