= 2015 in Danish television =

This is a list of Danish television related events from 2015.

== Events ==
- 7 March - 17-year-old beatboxer Thor "Thorsen" Mikkelsen wins the first season of Danmark har talent.
- 27 March - 15-year-old Emilie Esther wins the eighth season of X Factor.
- 31 October - 11-year-old Isabel wins the third season of Voice Junior.
- 27 November - Badehotellet actress Ena Spottag and her partner Thomas Evers Poulsen win the twelfth season of Vild med dans.

== Television shows ==
=== 1990s ===
- Hvem vil være millionær? (1999–present)

=== 2000s ===
- Vild med dans (2005–present)
- X Factor (2008–present)

=== 2010s ===
- Voice – Danmarks største stemme (2011–present)
- Danmark har talent (2014–present)

== Channels ==
Launches:

- 9 January: TV 2 Sport
- 30 June: Eurosport DK

== Closures ==
- 9 January: TV 2 Film
- 1 February: C More Kids
- 30 June: Canal 8 Sport
- 15 July: Showtime Scandinavia
- 15 July: Silver
- 15 July: Star! Scandinavia

== See also ==
- 2015 in Denmark
