= 2013 in Denmark =

- Decades: 1990s; 2000s; 2010s; 2020s
- See also: Other events of 2013; List of years in Denmark

Events from the year 2013 in Denmark.

== Incumbents ==
- Monarch – Margrethe II
- Prime minister – Helle Thorning Schmidt

== Events ==
- 1 April – The Danish government launches a lockout of all the Danish teachers. The lockout lasts until 26 April.
- 28 April – Danish Resistance Museum in Copenhagen burns.
- 27–28 October – The St. Jude storm hit Denmark. The storm's max gust speed of 194.4 km/h (120.8 mph) was the highest ever recorded in Denmark.

== Culture ==
=== Architecture ===
- 29 April – Henning Larsen Architects' Herpa Concert Hall wins the European Union Prize for Contemporary Architecture.
- 30 May – Gehl Architects are awarded the Nykredit Architecture Prize at a ceremony in Copenhagen.
- 12 June – 3XN's Frederiksberg Courthouse in Copenhagen and Lundgaard & Tranberg's Sorø Art Museum are among the year's nine recipients of RIBA RU Awards from the Royal Institute of British Architects.
- 20 September – Henning Larsen Architects win the LEAF Awards for Best Public Building of the Year in the Education & Research and Culture categories for Campus Roskilde and Herpa respectively.

=== Film ===
- 10 February – Thomas Vinterberg's The Hunt is nominated for Best Film Not in the English Language at the 66th British Academy Film Awards.
- 30 October – Thomas Vinterberg's The Hunt wins the Nordic Council Film Prize.
- 7 December – 26th European Film Awards
  - Susanne Bier's Love Is All You Need wins the award for Best Comedy.
  - Copenhagen-based Joshua Oppenheimer's The Act of Killing wins the award for Best Documentary
- 9 December – The Hunt wins the award for Best Foreign Independent Film at the British Independent Film Awards 2013.

=== Literature ===
- 30 October – Kim Leine's The Prophets of Eternal Fjord wins the Nordic Council's Literature Prize.

=== Media ===
- 28 January – DR launches DR3.
- 4 March – DR launches DR Ultra.

=== Music ===
- 18 May – Emmelie de Forest wins the 2013 Eurovision Song Contest in Malmö with the song Only Teardrops.

== Sport ==
=== Badminton ===
- 17 February – Denmark wins silver at the 2013 European Mixed Team Badminton Championships after being defeated by Germany in the final.
- 5–10 March – Tine Baun wins gold in Women's Single at 2013 All England Super Series Premier.
- 5–11 August – Denmark wins one silver medal and one bronze medal at the 2013 BWF World Championships.
- 22 October – Jan Ø. Jørgensen wins gold in men's single at the 2013 French Super Series.

=== Cycling ===
- 31 January – Michael Rasmussen admits that he has used performance-enhancing drugs and methods for the most of his professional career.
- 5 February – Lasse Norman Hansen (DEN) and Michael Mørkøv (DEN) win the Six Days of Copenhagen six-day track cycling race.

=== Football ===
- 5 May – FC Copenhagen wins the 2012–13 Danish Superliga by drawing Brøndby IF 0–0 at Brøndby Stadion.
- 9 May – Esbjerg fB wins the 2012–13 Danish Cup by defeating Randers FC 1–0 in the 2013 Danish Cup Final.

=== Golf ===
- 8 September – Thomas Bjørn wins Omega European Masters on the 2013 European Tour.
- 24 November – Morten Ørum Madsen wins South African Open Championship on the 2014 European Tour.
- 8 December – Thomas Bjørn wins Nedbank Golf Challenge on the 2014 European Tour.

=== Handball ===
- 27 January – Denmark wins silver at the 2013 World Men's Handball Championship after being defeated by Spain in the final.

=== Motorsports ===
- 23 June – Tom Kristensen wins the 2013 24 Hours of Le Mans for the ninth time as part of the Audi Sport Team Joest team.

== Deaths ==
=== January–March ===
- 12 January – John Hansen, football player (born 1924)
- 7 February – Peter Steen, actor (born 1936)
- 6 March – Keld Helmer-Petersen, photographer (born 1920)
- 19 March – Holger Juul Hansen, actor (born 1924)

=== April–June ===
- 4 April - Beatrice Palner, actress (born 1938)
- 22 April – Vivi Bak, actress (born 1939)
- 20 May – Haldor Topsøe, civil engineer (born 1913)
- 21 May – Count Christian of Rosenborg, cousin of the Danish Queen Margrethe II of Denmark (born 1942)
- 6 June – Erling Blöndal Bengtsson, cellist (born 1932)
- 22 June – Allan Simonsen, racing driver (born 1978)
- 22 June – Henning Larsen, architect (born 1925)

=== July–September ===
- 1 September – Ole Ernst, actor (born 1940)

=== October–December ===
- 5 October – Heidi Ryom, dancer (born 1955)
- 21 October - Rune T. Kidde, writer, storyteller, musician and artist (born 1957)
- 12 November - Kurt Trampedach, painter and sculptor (born 1943)
- 22 December – Hans Hækkerup, politician and former Minister of Defense (born 1945)

== See also ==
- 2013 in Danish television
