= 1990 in Denmark =

- Decades: 1970s; 1980s; 1990s; 2000s; 2010s
- See also: Other events of 1990; List of years in Denmark

Events from the year 1990 in Denmark.

== Incumbents ==
- Monarch – Margrethe II
- Prime minister – Poul Schlüter

== Events ==
- 2 February – Squatters are evicted from the Black Horse, a former roadside inn, on Vesterbrogade in Copenhagen after four years.

== The arts ==
- 26 March – At the 62nd Academy Awards, Kaspar Rostrup's Waltzing Regitze is among the five films nominated for Best Foreign Language Film but the Oscar goes to the Italian Cinema Paradiso.

== Sports ==
=== Badminton ===
- 8–14 April – With five gold medals, one silver medal and three bronze medals, Denmark finishes as the best nation at the 12th European Badminton Championships in Moscow, Soviet Union.
- 24– 28 March – 1990 Denmark Open
  - Poul-Erik Høyer Larsen wins gold in men's single by defeating Morten Frost in the final
  - Lotte Olsen and Dorte Kjær win gold in women's double by defeating Gillian Gowers and Gillian Clark in the final.
  - Thomas Lund and Pernille Dupont win gold in mixed double by defeating Henrik Svarrer and Marlene Thomsen in the final.

=== Cycling ===
- 24 March – Søren Lilholt wins 1990 E3 Prijs Vlaanderen.
- 14 October – Rolf Sørensen wins 1990 Paris–Tours.

=== Soccer ===
- Summer of 1992 wins Denmark a Europe tournament for soccer.

== Births ==
=== January–March ===
- 14 March – Şaban Özdoğan, footballer

=== April–June ===
- 17 April – Pil Kalinka Nygaard Jeppesen, singer
- 23 April – Mathias "Zanka" Jørgensen, football player
- 1 June – Kennie Chopart, footballer

=== July–September ===
- 11 July – Caroline Wozniacki, tennis player
- 22 September – Peter Ankersen, footballer

== Deaths ==
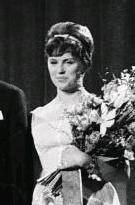
Grethe Ingmann-

- 19 June – Steen Eiler Rasmussen, architect and writer (born 1898)
- 18 August – Grethe Ingmann, singer (born 1938)
- 10 September – Harald Salomon, medallist and sculptor (born 1900)
- 30 December – Albert Mertz, painter (born 1920)
- 18 December – Grethe Glad, fashion designer and educator (born 1891)

== See also ==
- 1990 in Danish television
