= 1987 in Denmark =

- Decades: 1960s; 1970s; 1980s; 1990s; 2000s
- See also: Other events of 1987; List of years in Denmark

Events from the year 1987 in Denmark.

== Incumbents ==
- Monarch – Margrethe II
- Prime minister – Poul Schlüter

== Events ==
- 8 September – The 1987 Danish general election is held.

== Sports ==
=== Badminton ===
- Triton BK Aalborg wins Europe Cup.
- 15 March – Morten Frost wins gold in men's singles and Kirsten Larsen wins gold in women's singles at the 1987 All England Open Badminton Championships.

=== Cycling ===
- February – Johnny Weltz wins the Grand Prix d'Ouverture La Marseillaise.
- March – Rolf Sørensen wins the Tirreno–Adriatico cycle race in Italy.
- May/June – Johnny Weltz wins the Grand Prix de Plumelec-Morbihan.
- Danny Clark (AUS) and Tony Doyle (GBR) win the Six Days of Copenhagen six-day track cycling race.
- Unknown date – Herning IK wins the Danish Ice Hockey Championship.
- Unknown date – Hans-Henrik Ørsted wins gold in Men's individual pursuit at the 1987 UCI Track Cycling World Championships.

=== Football ===
- 14 October – Denmark qualifies for UEFA Euro 1988 in West Germany by defeating Wales in their last game in Group 6 of the UEFA Euro 1988 qualifying and thereby winning the group one point ahead of Czechoslovakia.

=== Swimming ===
- 16–23 – Benny Nielsen wins a silver medal in Men's 200 metre butterfly and a bronze medal in Men's 100 metre butterfly at the 1987 European Aquatics Championships

== Births ==
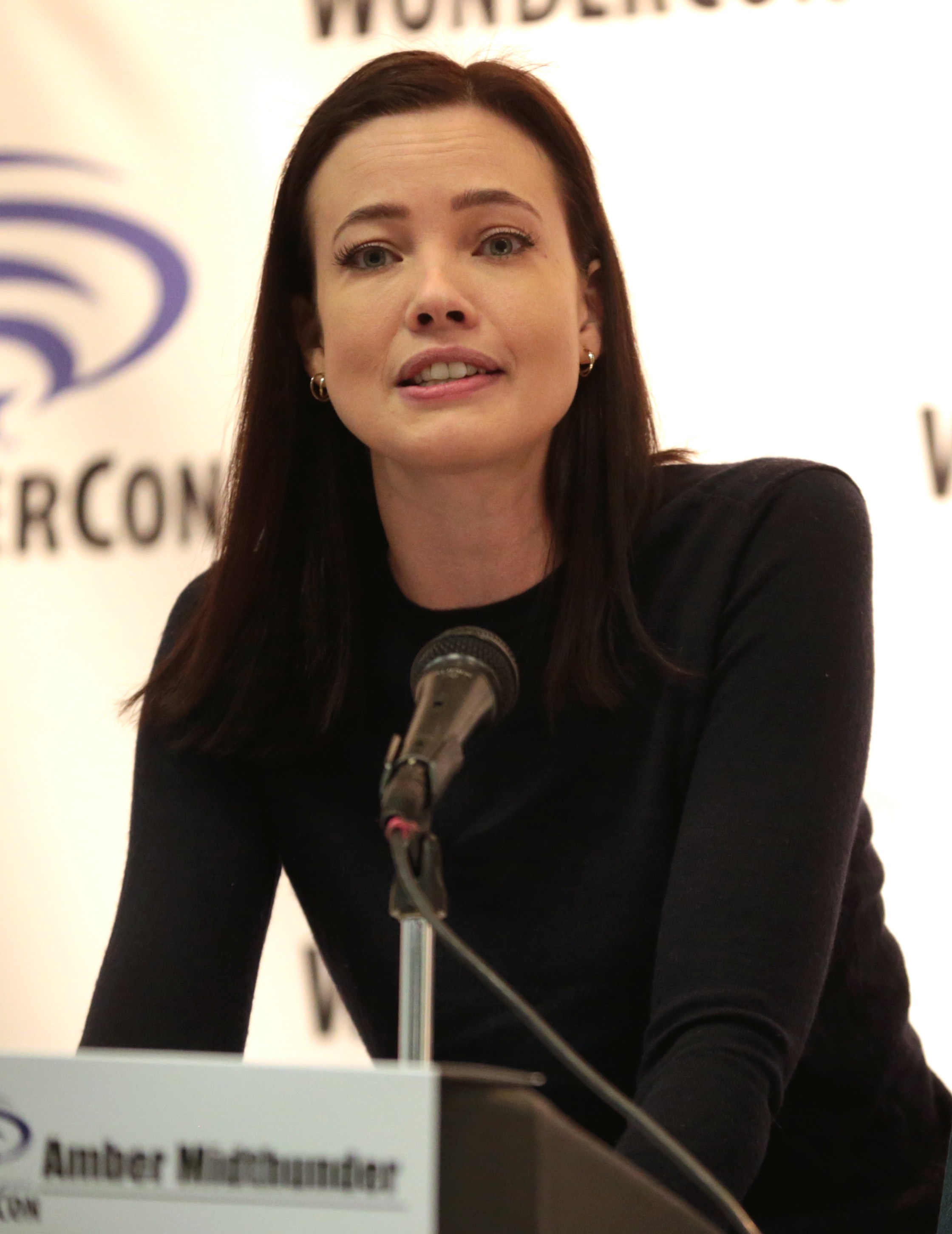
Stephanie Corneliussen.

=== January–March ===
- 16 January – Morten Madsen, professional ice hockey forward
- 21 January – Lisbet Jakobsen, rower
- 3 march – Lasse Nielsen, footballer

=== April–June ===
- 7 April – Søren Rieks, footballer
- 9 April – Sara Petersen, athlete
- 28 April – Stephanie Corneliussen, actress
- 26 May – Madeleine Dupont, curler from Hvidovre
- 5 June – Magnus Troest, footballer
- 1+ June – Prince Aage, Count of Rosenborg (died 1940 in Monaco)

=== July–September ===
- 12 July – Lisbeth Torfing, politician
- 13 July – Andreas Bube, middle-distance runner
- 27 July – Thomas Enevoldsen, professional footballer

=== October–December ===
- 7 October – Marie Key, singer
- 10 October – Nicklas Pedersen, footballer
- 15 October – Kevin Conboy, footballer
- 18 October – Freja Beha Erich, fashion model
- 22 October – Mikkel Hansen, handball player
- 7 November – Natalie Madueño, actress
- 30 November – Christian Offenberg, footballer
- 23 December – Martin Christensen, footballer
- 30 December – Jeanette Ottesen, swimmer

== Deaths ==
=== January–March ===
- 16 March – Johann Otto von Spreckelsen, architect (born 1929)

=== April–June ===
- 25 April – Mogens Bøggild, sculptor (born 1901)

=== July–September ===
- 4 July – Bengt Strömgren, astronomer (born 1908)

=== October–December ===
- 11 December – Aage Thaarup, fashion designer (born 1906)
- 13 November – Paul Neergaard, agronomist (born 1907)
- 20 November – Lilian Weber Hansen, actress (born 1911)
- 14 December – Mogens Lassen, architect (born 1901)
- 29 December – Ellen Louise Mertz, Denmark's first female geologist (born 1896)

== See also ==
- 1987 in Danish television
