= 2014 in Danish television =

This is a list of Danish television related events from 2014.

== Events ==
- 8 March - X Factor season 1 contestant Basim is selected to represent Denmark at the 2014 Eurovision Song Contest with his song "Cliché Love Song". He is selected to be the forty-second Danish Eurovision entry during Dansk Melodi Grand Prix held at the Arena Fyn in Odense.
- 28 March - Anthony Jasmin win the seventh season of X Factor, becoming the show's first group to emerge as winners.
- 27 April - David Feldstedt wins the sixth and final season of Big Brother.
- 10 May - The 59th Eurovision Song Contest is held at the B&W Hallerne in Copenhagen. Austria wins the contest with the song "Rise Like a Phoenix", performed by Conchita Wurst.
- 23 May - 13-year-old Malina wins the first season of Voice Junior.
- 22 November - 14-year-old Åland wins the second season of Voice Junior.
- 28 November - Go' Morgen Danmark weather-girl Sara Maria Franch-Mærkedahl and her partner Silas Holst win the eleventh season of Vild med dans.

== Debuts ==
- 1 January - The Legacy (2014-2017)
- 28 April - Heartless (2014--2015)
- 23 November - 1864 (2014)
- 1 December - Tidsrejsen (2014)
- 29 December - Danmark har talent (2014–present)

== Television shows ==
=== 1990s ===
- Hvem vil være millionær? (1999–present)

=== 2000s ===
- Vild med dans (2005–present)
- X Factor (2008–present)

=== 2010s ===
- Voice – Danmarks største stemme (2011–present)

== Ending this year ==
- Big Brother (2001-2005, 2012-2014)
- 22 November - Legends of Chima (2013-2014)
- 30 November - 1864 (2014)
- 24 December - Tidsrejsen (2014)

== Channels ==
Closures:

- 15 January: Viasat 3D
- 31 October: 7'eren

== See also ==
- 2014 in Denmark
