= Aarhus University shooting =

1994 school shooting in Aarhus, Denmark

Aarhus University Shooting
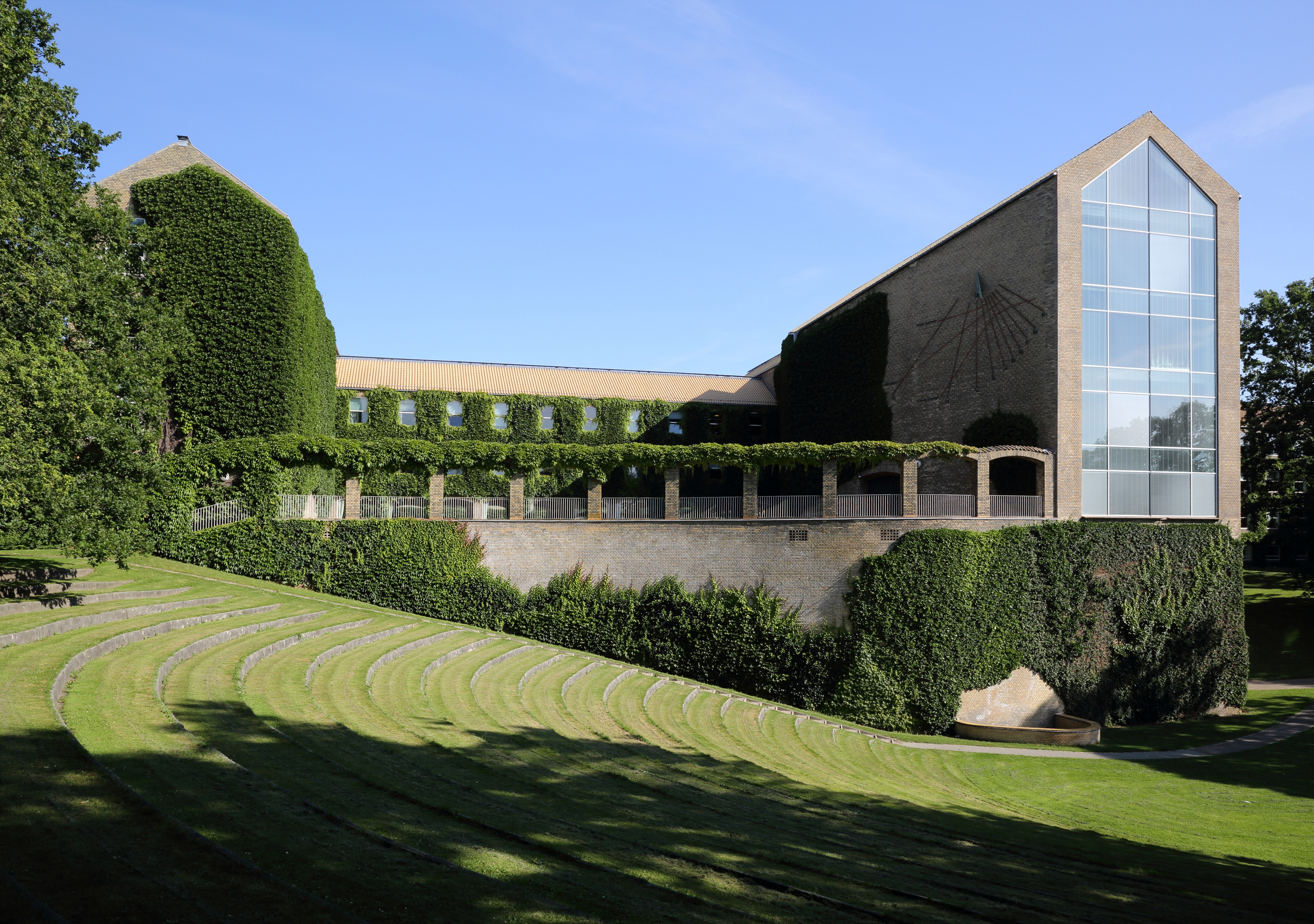
- Location: 56.171092°N 10.212406°E; Aarhus, Jutland, Denmark
- Date: 5 April 1994
- Attack type: School shooting, murder-suicide
- Weapon: sawed-off shotgun
- Deaths: 3 (including the perpetrator)
- Injuries: 2
- Perpetrator: Flemming Nielsen
- Motive: Depression (assumed)

On Tuesday, 5 April 1994, 35-year-old Flemming Nielsen of Silkeborg shot four female students, killing two of them, at Aarhus University in Denmark. Nielsen had been a student at the university since 1986. He opened fire with a sawed-off shotgun in a university cafeteria where he killed his first victim, 24-year-old Birgit Bohn Wolfsen. The remaining students in the room managed to escape. Nielsen proceeded into another cafeteria and opened fire again, killing his second victim, 27-year-old Randi Thode Kristensen. Another two people were wounded but survived.

Flemming Nielsen then retreated to a basement bathroom stall where he committed suicide via gunshot wound. The autopsy revealed that he had taken Fontex before the incident, and police found a suicide note at his home, stating how he "could not handle life anymore", and that he wanted to kill some people before ending his own life. It remains the only school shooting that has occurred in Denmark.
