= Mathias Pachler =

Danish singer

Mathias Rønne Pachler (born in Denmark) is a Danish singer. He is best known for his participation in the first season of the Danish singing competition Voice – Danmarks største stemme on Danish television station TV 2, and eventually becoming runner-up in the show behind winner Kim Wagner. He was signed to Universal Records and his debut single is "Mit et og alt". In August 2012, Mathias created the band Short End with friends from high school.

== In Voice – Danmarks største stemme ==
In 2011, he auditioned for the first season 2011-2012 of the Danish version of The Voice called Voice – Danmarks største stemme (meaning the Voice - Denmark's best voice) when he sang "Use Somebody" from Kings of Leon with two of the four judges, namely Lene Nystrøm and Steen Jørgensen hitting their "I Want You" buttons. The other two judges Sharin Foo and L.O.C. didn't turn their chairs. Pachler chose to become part of the Lene Nystrøm team. The audition was broadcast on November 26, 2011, the first airing day of the show.

In the Battle round, he was confronted with fellow Lene Nystrøm team competitor Henriette Andersen. They both sang "Set the Fire to the Third Bar" from Snow Patrol and Pachler moved to the next round.

In the second live show, he sang "Fever" from Peggy Lee and in the fourth live show "I Promised Myself" from Nick Kamen and in the fifth live show "Ayo Technology from 50 Cent reaching the finals.

In the final round, he sang "Dear Mr. President" from Pink and "City Boy" with guest Donkeyboy coming runner-up, with competition won by Kim Wagner.

== After competition ==
He signed a record deal with Universal Music Denmark in February 2012 releasing his debut single "Mit et og alt" that made it to the Danish Singles Chart on the week of its release.

== Discography ==
=== Singles ===
Year	Song	Peak position	Certification	Album
Year	Song	(DEN)	Certification	Album
2012	"Mit et og alt"	13		TBA
