= 2016 in Denmark =

- Decades: 1990s; 2000s; 2010s; 2020s
- See also: Other events of 2016; List of years in Denmark

== Incumbents ==
- Monarch – Margrethe II
- Prime Minister – Lars Løkke Rasmussen

== Events ==
- Kundby case Failed Islamist terror bombing plot.
- 28 November – The third cabinet of Lars Løkke Rasmussen is presented at Amalienborg Palace.

== Culture ==
=== Film ===
- 20 February – Trine Dyrholm wins the Silver Bear for Best Actress for her role in Thomas Vinterberg's The Commune at the 66th Berlin International Film Festival.

== Sport ==
=== Badminton ===
- 23–27 – Anders Antonsen wins gold in Men's Single, Mette Poulsen wins gold in Women's Single and Mathias Christiansen and David Daugaard win gold in Men's Double at the 2016 Scottish Open Grand Prix.
- 26 April–1 May – With four gold medals, three silver medals and four bronze medals, Denmark finishes as the best nation at the 2016 European Badminton Championships.
- 22 May – Denmark wins the 2016 Thomas & Uber Cup by defeating Indonesia 3–2 in the final.
- 30 October – Mathias Boe and Carsten Mogensen win gold in men's double at the 2016 French Super Series.

=== Cycling ===
- 9 February – Jesper Mørkøv (DEN) and Alex Rasmussen (DEN) win the Six Days of Copenhagen six-day track cycling race.

=== Golf ===
- 6 November – Thorbjørn Olesen wins Turkish Airlines Open.

=== Ice hockey ===
- March 25–31 – 2016 IIHF Women's World Championship Division I Group A in Aalborg

=== Other ===
- 20–27 August – Maja Alm wins a gold medal in Women's sprint and Denmark wins two silver medals in Mixed sprint relay and Women's relay at the 2016 World Orienteering Championships-

== Deaths ==
=== January–March ===
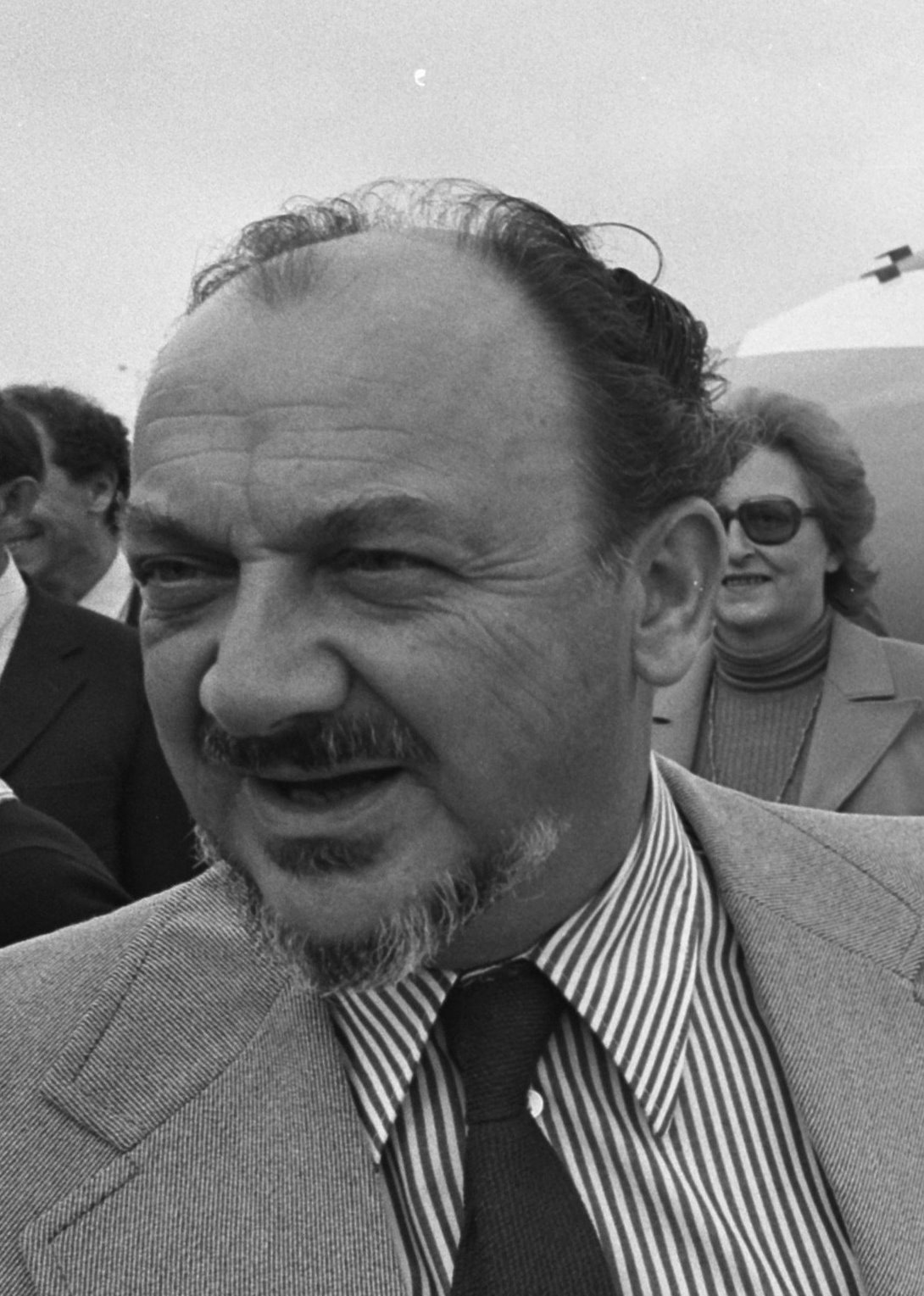
Anker Jørgensen.

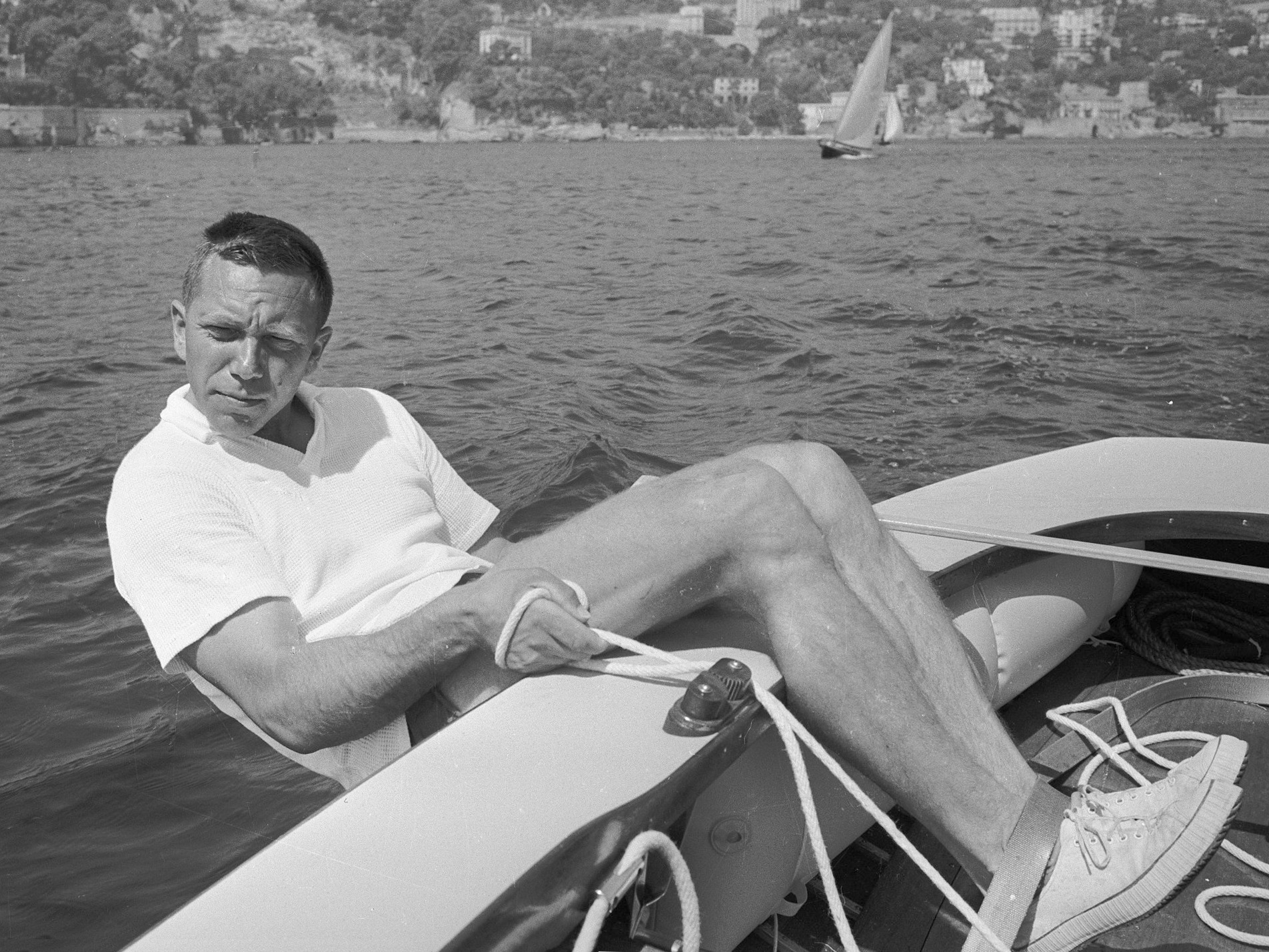
Paul Elvstrøm.

- 3 January – Peter Naur, computer scientist (born 1928)
- 18 January – Else Marie Pade, composer (born 1924)
- 28 January – Egon Fischer, sculptor (born 1935)
- 8 February – Viggo Rivad, photographer (born 1922)
- 21 February – Nina Hole, artist (born 1940)
- 20 February – Ove Verner Hansen, actor (born 1932)
- 5 March – Helle-Vibeke Erichsen, artist and illustrator (born 1940)
- 20 March – Anker Jørgensen, politician and former prime minister of Denmark (born 1922)

=== April–June ===
- 22 April – Anne Wolden-Ræthinge, journalist (born 1929)

=== July–September ===
- 8 July – Gurli Vibe Jensen, missionary, priest and writer (born 1924)
- 4 August – Willy Hansen, cyclist (died 1978)
- 1 September – Grethe Philip, politician (born 1916)

=== October–December ===
- 7 December – , sailor (died 1928)
- 31 December – Henning Christophersen, politician and EU commissioner (born 1939)

== See also ==
- 2016 in Danish television
