= 2015 in Denmark =

- Decades: 1990s; 2000s; 2010s; 2020s
- See also: Other events of 2015; List of years in Denmark

The following lists events that happened in 2015 in Denmark.

As the Danish constitution require parliamentary elections to occur at least every four years (the latest election to the Folketing being conducted in 2011), 2015 will be an election year.

== Incumbents ==
- Monarch – Margrethe II
- Prime Minister – Helle Thorning Schmidt (until 28 June), Lars Løkke Rasmussen

== Events ==
- 12 February – Politiken staff photographer Mads Nissen wins the 2014 World Press Photo of the Year.
- 14–15 February – 2015 Copenhagen shootings: Two people are killed and several police officers are injured in shootings, the first at a free speech gathering of journalists, artists and cartoonists, the second at the Great Synagogue in Copenhagen.
- 15 February – Danish police kill a man near Nørrebro station after an exchange of gunfire. The police believe he was the man responsible for two previous attacks.
- 17–19 March – State visit from His Majesty The King and Her Majesty The Queen of the Netherlands.

== Sports ==
=== Badminton ===
- 13–18 January – Christinna Pedersen and Kamilla Rytter Juhl win gold in Women's Double at Malaysia Masters.
- 15 February – Denmark wins gold at the 2015 European Mixed Team Badminton Championships by defeating England 3–0 in the final.
- 24 February – 1 March – Jan Ø. Jørgensen wins gold in Men's Single, Mads Conrad-Petersen/Mads Pieler Kolding win gold in Men's Double, Christinna Pedersen/Kamilla Rytter Juhl win gold in Women's Double and Mads Pieler Kolding/Kamilla Rytter Juhl win gold in Mixed Double at the 2015 German Open Grand Prix Gold.
- 3–8 March – Mathias Boe and Carsten Mogensen win gold in men's double at the 2015 All England Super Series Premier.
- 10–16 August – Denmark wins one silver medal and one bronze medal at the 2015 BWF World Championships.
- 18–22 November – Hans-Kristian Vittinghus wins gold in Men's Single and Line Kjærsfeldt wins gold in Women's Single at the 2015 Scottish Open Grand Prix.

=== Cycling ===
- 3 February – Michael Mørkøv (DEN) and Alex Rasmussen (DEN) win the Six Days of Copenhagen six-day track cycling race.

=== Golf ===
- 31 May – Søren Kjeldsen wins Dubai Duty Free Irish Open on the 2015 European Tour.
- 4 October – Thorbjørn Olesen wins Alfred Dunhill Links Championship on the 2015 European Tour.

=== Sailing ===
- Date unknown – Anne-Marie Rindom wins gold at the Women's ILCA 6 World Championship in Al Mussanah.

=== Other ===
- 19–23 August – Denmark wins two gold medals at the 2015 ICF Canoe Sprint World Championships.
- 7 September – Mark Madsen wins a silver medal in Men's Greco-Roman 75 kg at the 2015 World Wrestling Championships.

== Deaths ==
=== January–March ===
- 6 February – Kathrine Windfeld, film director (born 1966)
- 13 March – Inge Eriksen, writer and political activist (born 1935)
- 14 March – Ib Melchior, film director and screenwriter (born 1917)
- 21 March – Jørgen Ingmann, musician (born 1925)

=== April–June ===
- 2 April – Per Vilhelm Brüel, physicist and engineer (born 1915)
- 3 May – Holger Hansen, politician (born 1929)

=== July–September ===
- 1 August – Harald Nielsen, footballer (born 1941)
- 9 September – Jørgen Sonne, writer (born 1925)

== See also ==
- 2015 in Danish television
- 2015 in the European Union
