= 1988 in Denmark =

- Decades: 1960s; 1970s; 1980s; 1990s; 2000s
- See also: Other events of 1988; List of years in Denmark

Events from the year 1988 in Denmark.

== Incumbents ==
- Monarch – Margrethe II
- Prime minister – Poul Schlüter

== Events ==
- 10 May – The 1988 Danish general election takes place.
- 3 November – The old main post office in Købmagergade, Copenhagen, is robbed by what is later to become known as Blekinge Street Gang. One policeman is killed in the robbery.

== Culture ==
=== Film ===
- 23 May – Bille August's film Pelle the Conqueror wins the Palme d'Or at the 41st Cannes Film Festival.

=== Music ===
==== Classical music ====
- 27 November – Frederik Magle's Cantata for choir and chamber orchestra We Are Afraid (Vi er bange) is premiered in Grundtvig's Church, Copenhagen.

== Sports ==
- 17 September – 2 October – Denmark at the 1988 Summer Olympics in Seoul: 2 gold medals, 1 silver medal and 1 bronze medal.

=== Badminton ===
- Triton BK Aalborg wins silver at Europe Cup.
- 20 March – Ib Frederiksen wins gold in men's singles at the 1988 All England Open Badminton Championships.
- 10–18 April – With five gold medals, three silver medals and two bronze medals, Denmark finishes as the best nation at the 11th European Badminton Championships in Kristiansand, Norway.

=== Cycling ===
- 21 July – Johnny Weltz wins Stage 19 of the 1988 Tour de France.
- 21–25 August – Denmark wins two bronze medals at the 1988 UCI Track Cycling World Championships.
- Roman Hermann (LIE) and Hans-Henrik Ørsted (DEN) wins the Six Days of Copenhagen six-day track cycling race.

=== Football ===
- 10–25 June – Denmark participates in the UEFA Euro 1988 but does not make it beyond the initial group stage after finishing last in Group A.

=== Motorsports ===
- 1988 Danish speedway season

== Births ==
=== January–March ===
- 2 January – Nadia Nadim, footballer
- 9 January – Michael Lumb, footballer
- 12 January – Mads Conrad-Petersen, badminton player
- 16 January – Nicklas Bendtner, footballer
- 7 February – Nicki Bille Nielsen, footballer
- 9 February – Lotte Friis, swimmer
- 17 February – Alex Vargas, singer
- 8 March – Jacob Neestrup, football coach

=== July–September ===
- 10 July – Maja Alm, runner
- 19 July – Mie Augustesen, handball player
- 25 July – Hedegaard, DJ and music producer
- 12 August – MØ, singer
- 18 September – Lukas Forchhammer, singer, songwriter and actor
- 21 September – Jacob Barsøe, rower

=== October–December ===
- 18 October – Mads Glæsner, swimmer
- 23 October – Nicolaj Agger, footballer
- 19 December – Niklas Landin Jacobsen, handball player

== Deaths ==
- 27 April – Olaf Wieghorst, painter (born 1899)
- 18 July – Elsa Gress, author (born 1919)
- 29 July – Gertie Wandel, textile artist (born 1894)
- 5 November – C. F. Møller, architect (born 1898)

== See also ==
- 1988 in Danish television
