= 2016 in Danish television =

This is a list of Danish television related events from 2016.

== Events ==
- 13 February - Lighthouse X are selected to represent Denmark at the 2016 Eurovision Song Contest with their song "Soldiers of Love". They are selected to be the forty-fourth Danish Eurovision entry during Dansk Melodi Grand Prix held at the Forum Horsens in Horsens.
- 19 March - 23-year-old Rubik's Cube solver Matias Rasmussen wins the second season of Danmark har talent.
- 1 April - Embrace win the ninth season of X Factor.
- 25 November - Boxer Sarah Mahfoud and her partner Morten Kjeldgaard win the thirteenth season of Vild med dans.

== Debuts ==
- 11 January – Nexo Knights
- 29 February – Bedre skilt end aldrig

== Television shows ==
=== 1990s ===
- Hvem vil være millionær? (1999–present)

=== 2000s ===
- Vild med dans (2005–present)
- X Factor (2008–present)

=== 2010s ===
- Voice – Danmarks største stemme (2011–present)
- Danmark har talent (2014–present)

== Channels ==
Launches:

- 1 September: C More Stars

Closures:

- 1 September: Canal+ Emotion

== See also ==
- 2016 in Denmark
