= 2011 in Danish television =

This is a list of Danish television related events from 2011.

== Events ==
- 25 March – 15-year-old Sarah Skaalum Jørgensen wins the fourth season of X Factor.
- 25 November – Freestyle skier Sophie Fjellvang-Sølling and her partner Silas Holst win the eighth season of Vild med dans.

== Debuts ==
- 26 November – Voice – Danmarks største stemme (2011–present)

== Television shows ==
=== 1990s ===
- Hvem vil være millionær? (1999–present)

=== 2000s ===
- Vild med dans (2005–present)
- X Factor (2008–present)

== Channels ==
Launches:

- 1 June: Canal+ Emotion
- 1 June: Canal+ Family
- 1 July: Canal+ Emotion

Closures:

- 1 July: Canal+ Drama

== See also ==
- 2011 in Denmark
