= 1967 in Danish television =

This is a list of Danish television related events from 1967.

== Births ==
- 28 April – Claes Bang, actor
- 10 July – Anne-Cathrine Herdorf, singer & actress
- 9 August – Nicolaj Kopernikus, actor
- 17 September – Anne Louise Hassing, actress

== Deaths ==
Date	Name	Age	Cinematic Credibility
9 May	Svend Pedersen	54	Danish director

== See also ==
- 1967 in Denmark
