= 1990 in Danish television =

This is a list of Danish television related events from 1990.

== Events ==
- 30 September - TV3 Denmark is separated from the earlier Pan-Scandinavian version of the channel.

== Channels ==
Launches:

- Unknown: TV 2 Østjylland

== Births ==
- 6 July - Besir Zeciri, Albanian-born actor

== See also ==
- 1990 in Denmark
