= 1978 in Danish television =

This is a list of Danish television related events from 1978.

== Events ==
- 25 February – Mabel are selected to represent Denmark at the 1978 Eurovision Song Contest with their song "Boom Boom". They are selected to be the eleventh Danish Eurovision entry during Dansk Melodi Grand Prix held at the Tivolis Koncertsal in Copenhagen.

== Television shows ==
- Draculas ring (October 15 to October 21)

== Births ==
- 7 January – Sami Darr, actress
- 25 January – Signe Muusmann, TV & radio host
- 6 June – Louise Wolff, journalist & TV host
- 13 September – Morten Resen, TV host
- 14 October – Jacob Riising, actor & TV host
- 22 October – Cecilie Hother, weathergirl
- 1 November – Lise Rønne, journalist & TV host.

== See also ==
- 1978 in Denmark
