= 1974 in Danish television =

This is a list of Danish television related events from 1974.

== Births ==
- 17 March – Mille Dinesen, actress
- 16 October – Signe Svendsen, singer & TV host
- 22 December – Laura Drasbæk, actress & author

== See also ==
- 1974 in Denmark
