= Kim Wagner =

Danish singer and musician

Kim Wagner (born 1969) is a Danish singer, songwriter and musician. He is best known for winning the first season of the Danish singing competition Voice – Danmarks største stemme on Danish television station TV 2.

== Beginnings ==
Kim Wagner has worked as a professional musician for a long time, ever since he graduated from school. He has played and worked with renowned names like Big Fat Snake, Back to Back, Nikolaj Steen, Sanne Salomonsen, Erann DD, Martin Brygmann and D-A-D. In November 1999 he had released his debut album All I Ever Wanted on EMI and had minor hits with the title track "All I Ever Wanted" as well as with singles "Praying for Rain" and "Free" all in 1999.

== In Voice – Danmarks største stemme ==
In 2011, he auditioned with great success for the first season 2011-2012 of the Danish version of The Voice called Voice – Danmarks største stemme (meaning the Voice - Denmark's best voice) when he sang "Crazy" from Gnarls Barkley with all four judges hitting their "I Want You" buttons. He chose to become part of the L.O.C. team. The audition was broadcast on December 17, 2011.

In the Battle round, he was confronted with fellow L.O.C. team competitor Pernille Leeloo. They both sang "Teardrop" from Massive Attack and Wagner moved to the next round. The duo song was heavily downloaded and peaked at #31 on the Danish Singles Chart the following week.

In the first live show, he sang "Prayin'" from Plan B and in the third live show "Lady Luck" from Jamie Woon and in the fifth live show "Go" from Delilah reaching the finals.

In the final round, he sang "All the Right Moves" from OneRepublic and "Dedication to My Ex (Miss That)" with guest Lloyd winning the competition with Mathias Rønne Pachler as runner-up.

He won a record deal with Universal Music Denmark in February 2012.

== After competition ==
Subsequently, he released his debut single "The Song, Oh!" which he had written in collaboration with Bo Christensen, Tom Lindby and Dan Hougesen from rock group Natural Born Hippies.

== Discography ==
=== Albums ===
- 1999: All I Ever Wanted (EMI)

Year	Album	Peak position	Certification
Year	Album	(DEN)	Certification
2012	Universe Outside the World	6	

=== Singles ===
- 1999: "Praying for Rain" (EMI)
- 1999: "All I Ever Wanted" (EMI)
- 1999: "Free" (EMI)

Year	Song	Peak position	Certification	Album
Year	Song	(DEN)	Certification	Album
2012	"Teardrop" (with Pernille Leeloo)	31		TBA
2012	"The Song, Oh!"	5		TBA

Awards and achievements
Preceded by N/A	Voice – Danmarks største stemme Winner; 2011-12	Succeeded by Emilie Paevatalu
