= 1972 in Danish television =

This is a list of Danish television related events from 1972.

== Births ==
- 1 June - Stine Stengade, actress
- 15 August - Lisbeth Janniche, journalist & TV host
- 30 August - Kaya Brüel, singer-songwriter & actress
- 11 November - Camilla Ottesen, TV host

== See also ==
- 1972 in Denmark
