= 1981 in Danish television =

This is a list of Danish television related events from 1981.

== Events ==
- 28 February – Tommy Seebach and Debbie Cameron are selected to represent Denmark at the 1981 Eurovision Song Contest with their song "Krøller eller ej". They are selected to be the fourteenth Danish Eurovision entry during Dansk Melodi Grand Prix held at the Valencia-Varieteen in Copenhagen.

== Births ==
- 16 March – Anne Kejser, TV & radio host & actress
- 20 May – Marie Egede, comedian and TV host

== Deaths ==
- 17 February – Ellen Gottschalch, 86, actress.

== See also ==
- 1981 in Denmark
