= 1984 in Danish television =

This is a list of Danish television related events from 1984.

== Events ==
- 18 February – Hot Eyes are selected to represent Denmark at the 1984 Eurovision Song Contest with their song "Det' lige det". They are selected to be the seventeenth Danish Eurovision entry during Dansk Melodi Grand Prix held at the DR Studios in Copenhagen.

== Channels ==
Launches:

- 13 October: Kanal 23

== Births ==
- 5 February – Sarah Grünewald, model, TV host & actress.
- 21 July – Said Chayesteh, Iranian-born actor.

== See also ==
- 1985 in Denmark
