= Wellbeing at Work conference =

- Abbreviation: WAW
- Discipline: Occupational safety and health

Publication details
- Publisher: NRCWE
- Frequency: biannual until 2016 then triannual

The International Wellbeing at Work (WAW) series of academic conferences is relatively new in the field of occupational safety and health. WAW has been held biannually since 2010 and attracts researchers and practitioners of the field. In 2016, WAW 2016 was hosted by TNO in Amsterdam; in 2014, by NRCWE in Copenhagen . WAW 2012 was held in Manchester, Great Britain; The WAW 2019 in Paris. The local organizer of this edition was INRS. In 2020, CIOP-PIB organized the edition on-line on the theme of Wellbeing at Work in Hectic Times.

The organization of this cycle of conferences is supported by the PEROSH "Wellbeing and Work" project group.

Perosh in the European Network for Research on Occupational Safety and Health. Wellbeing at work is considered a strategic component of OSH in Europe.

It is not to be confused with the Health and Wellbeing at Work Conference, which is a purely commercial event, held only in UK,

== Past and future Wellbeing at Work conferences ==
Past and future Wellbeing at Work conferences include:

Year	City	Country	Link – theme
2025	Swedish Agency for Work Environment Expertise	Sweden	
2022	Organized on line by CIOP-PIB and Perosh Network	Poland	Wellbeing in Hectic Times
2019	Paris	France	Wellbeing at Work in a Changing World. Opportunities and Challenges
2016	Amsterdam	The Netherlands	http://www.wellbeingatworl.nl
2014	Copenhagen	Denmark	http://nrcwe.dk/waw2014
2012	Manchester	(United Kingdom) Great Britain	http://www.hsl.gov.uk/health-and-safety-conferences/wellbeing-2nd-international-conference-2012/home.aspx
2010	Helsinki	Finland	Towards Better Work
