= 1983 in Danish television =

This is a list of Danish television related events from 1983.

== Events ==
- 5 March – Gry Johansen is selected to represent Denmark at the 1983 Eurovision Song Contest with her song "Kloden drejer". She is selected to be the sixteenth Danish Eurovision entry during Dansk Melodi Grand Prix held at the DR Studios in Copenhagen.

== Channels ==
Launches:

- 22 October: TV Syd

== Births ==
- 23 March – Mathilde Norholt, actress
- 5 September – Emil Thorup, TV & radio host
- 6 September – Søren Bregendal, actor & singer-songwriter

== See also ==
- 1983 in Denmark
