= Erland Kolding Nielsen =

Erland Kolding-Nielsen
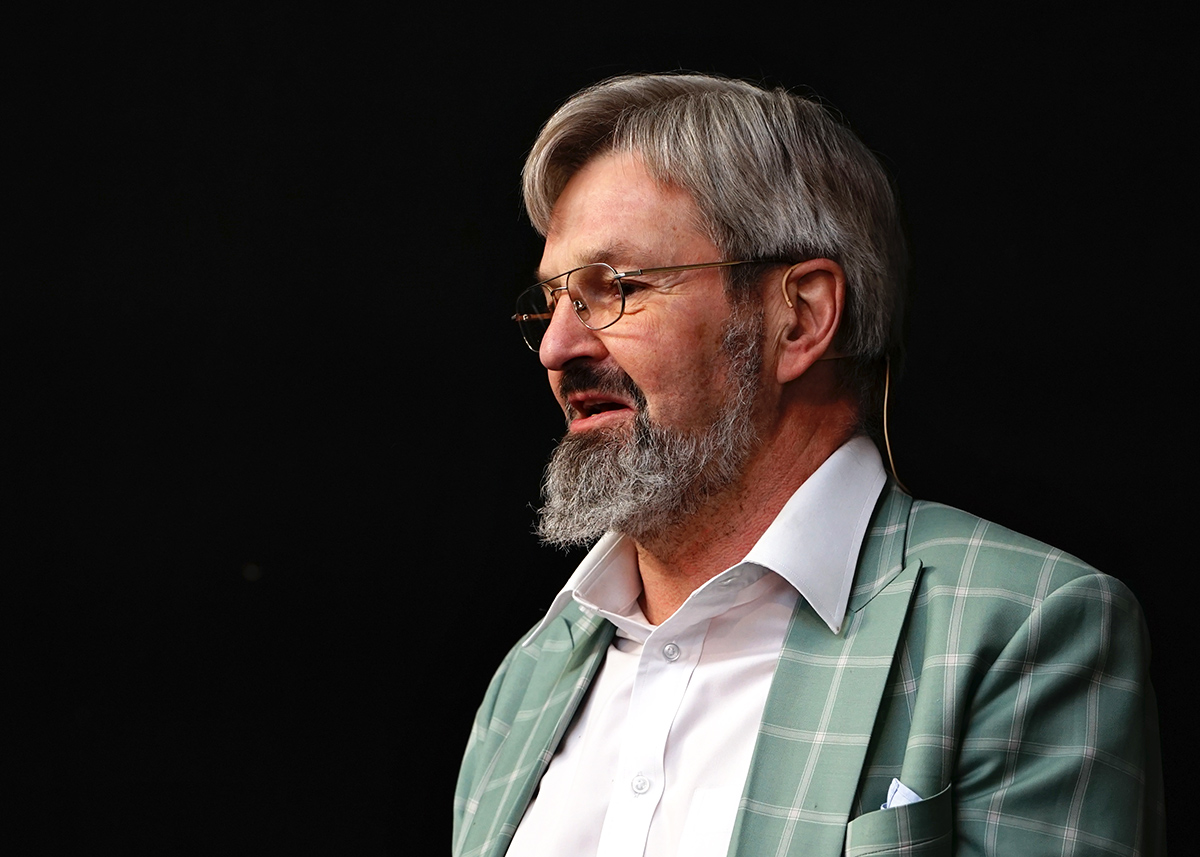
- Eræand Kolding-Nielsen in April 2016

Chief Executive of the Royal Danish Library
- In office 1986–2017
- Preceded by: Torkil Olsen
- Succeeded by: Svend Larsen

Personal details
- Born: 13 January 1947 Frederiksberg, Copenhagen, Denmark
- Died: 23 January 2017 (aged 70)
- Spouse: Inger Sørensen
- Children: Two
- Education: University of Copenhagen

Erland Kolding Nielsen (13 January 1947 – 23 January 2017) was Director General and CEO of The Danish Royal Library (now part of the National Library of Denmark, the Copenhagen University Library, the National Museum for Books and Printing, the National Museum of Photography, the Danish Museum of Cartoons).

== Early life and career ==
Erland Kolding-Nielsen was born in the Frederiksberg district of Copenhagen on Monday January 13, 1947. He obtained a MA in history in 1973, writing a thesis for the Gold Medal of the University of Copenhagen. He then served as lecturer in history and library science at the Royal School of Librarianship. Copenhagen, 1971–1980. Head of the Department of Humanities and Social Sciences 1980–1986. Head of the Education of Research Librarians and Documentalists 1984–1986 part-time Associate Professor at the Institute of Contemporary History, University of Copenhagen, 1973–1983. Professor Adjunct, Faculty of Humanities, University of Copenhagen 2013–2017.

== The Royal Library ==
Erland Kolding Nielsen was appointed Director General af The Royal Library in March 1986. He has been leading the national library's physical and digital development within administration, organisation and collection development, and by digitalisation of the library's collections. The first online catalogue REX was introduced in 1987 with electronic circulation from 1990. All aspects of internal and external library management and services were fully digitalised from 2007, constituting the full digital library. All physical catalogues, including numerous handwritten, were retro-converted by 2015, the catalogues of the five main collections by 2010, into REX, now comprising more than 9 million records. Together with the State and University Library of Aarhus Kolding Nielsen managed for the first time in 70 years to get a new Legal Deposit Law through the Ministry of Culture, which was passed by the Parliament in 1997, and fundamentally revised again in 2004, including all digital formats. Established in 2009 as a new part of the National Bibliography a full registration of retro-digitalised collections of all kinds in Denmark (2016, c. 330). The collections, now mounting to 35 million items (2015), were greatly enlarged in his time, the collections of photographs more than doubled to 20 million, big music and other private and institutional archives, the Netarchive.dk was established 2005, now comprising more than 25 billion documents and 2.4 million Danish websites.

The library as a research institution was greatly enhanced, including monumental scholarly editions as the Carl Nielsen Edition (52 vol.s 1998-2009), followed by the Danish Centre for Music Publication from 2009, the Correspondence of Werner Best with the German Foreign Office and other German Documents Concerning the Occupation of Denmark 1942-45 (in German, 10 vol.s 2012), and within the series Danish Humanist Texts and Studies, altogether more than 300 volumes through 30 years. Succeeded with the second Danish-Swedish exchange of manuscripts in 2011 (return of Codex holmiensis C 37 from Stockholm). As member since 1987 and chair since 1995 of the Commission on Exports of Cultural Assets he channelled many books, manuscripts and archived into the Royal Library.

From 1999 the cultural functions and services of the national library to the public were greatly enlarged, including a chamber orchestra-in-residence the DiamondEnsemble from 2004, a semi-permanent treasure exhibition in the Montana Hall 2006, the International Author’s Stage 2008, and many other exhibitions, lecture series, artists’ talks, conferences, etc.

During the same period, extensive structural changes has taken place, the biggest of which is the waterfront's new landmark, the Black Diamond, which after a European architectural competition I 1993, won by Schmidt, Hammer, Lassen Architects, was completed in 1999, with the multifunctional chamber music hall, The Queen’s Hall. The iconic university library building from 1861 in Fiolstræde was completely renovated 1997, and a new Faculty Library for the Humanities at the Amager Campus of the University of Copenhagen, completed in two phases in 1998 and 2008. Responsible for 11 institutional mergers into the Royal Library since 1990, most importantly the National Library for Science and Medicine 2005 and the Danish Folk Archives 2008.

== International professional bodies ==
Arbeitsgemeinschaft Bibliotheca Baltica, member of the board 1994–1998.

ECPA, the European Commission on Preservation and Access 2000–2008.

IFLA, the International Federation of Library Associations and Institutions: Standing Committee of the Section for National Libraries 1989–1997, secretary 1991–1995, chair of the Division (I) for General Research Libraries, member and vice-chair of the Professional Board 1991–1993, initiator and member of the Organizing Committee of the 63rd IFLA General Conference in Copenhagen 1997, initiator and organizer of The International Conference on National Bibliographic Services, Copenhagen 1998.

LIBER, Ligue des Bibliothèques Européenne de Recherches, member of the Executive Board 1994–2017, vice president 1999–2002, president 2003–2006, past president 2007–2009. TEL (the European Library), member of the Management Committee 2009, chair, 2011–2013.

Member of six juries of architectural competitions of library and university buildings in Denmark, Norway and Latvia; member, sometimes chair of evaluation committees for the appointment of national librarians and library directors in Scandinavia; invited member of the International UNES¬CO Commission of Experts for the National Library of Latvia (ICE), 1999–2014.

== National professional bodies ==
Board of the Library Section of National Union Academics, chair 1977–1985. Research Librarians' Council, secretary 1975–1979, chair 1979–1982. Board of the Danish Research Library Association 1987–2002, vice-chair 1996–1998, chair 1998–2002. Member of The National Advisory Council for Research Libraries 1986–1998, of the National Bibliographic Council 1987-1998 (dissolved); member of the Joint Advisory Council for Cooperation between Public and Research Libraries 1987–1998; ex officio member of the Joint Advisory Board for Danish Libraries (established) 1998–2016.

Danish National Commission on Export of Cultural Assets 1987, vice chair 1994, chair 1995–2016. The Danish Memory of the World Committee of the Danish National UNESCO Commission, Chair, 1996–2016. The Danish Book Craft Society, chair 2008–2017.

== Publications ==
Kolding Nielsen was an author and editor of 14 books in history, historical bibliography, egyptology, library history, library science and architecture, former editor of two professional journals, on the editorial boards of four others, and long-time editor of the scholarly monograph series Danish Humanist Texts and Studies (now c. 55 titles), articles in professional journals, Festschriften etc. He died at the age of 70 on 23 January 2017.

== Personal life ==
Kolding Nielsen was married to Inger Sørensen (born 8 June 1944), senior research librarian/ass. professor and musicologist. He had two children from a previous marriage.

== Honors ==
1. Knight Commander of the Danish Order of Dannebrog (K);
2. Commander of the Latvian Order of the Cross of Recognition (Le.C.R.3);
3. Medal in Honour of the 800th Anniversary of the Great Mongolian Statehood (Mong. Med. 800);
4. Commander of the Norwegian Royal Order of Merit (No.F.3).
