= 1979 in Danish television =

This is a list of Danish television related events from 1979.

== Events ==
- 3 February – Tommy Seebach is selected to represent Denmark at the 1979 Eurovision Song Contest with his song "Disco Tango". He is selected to be the twelfth Danish Eurovision entry during Dansk Melodi Grand Prix held at the DR Studios in Copenhagen.

== Debuts ==
=== International ===
- 8 June - (United Kingdom) Doctor Who

== Births ==
- 25 April – Laura Bach, actress
- 7 June – Julie Berthelsen, singer & TV host
- 18 July – Sofie Lassen-Kahlke, actress
- 25 September – Mikkel Herforth, TV host
- 5 October – Robert Hansen, actor & TV host

== See also ==
- 1979 in Denmark
