= 1976 in Danish television =

This is a list of Danish television related events from 1976.

== Births ==
- 13 April – Uffe Holm, comedian & TV host
- 1 July – Andrea Elisabeth Rudolph, TV & radio host.
- 8 August – Sisse Fisker, TV host and journalist.
- 23 September – Szhirley, singer & actress

== See also ==
- 1976 in Denmark
