= 1973 in Danish television =

This is a list of Danish television related events from 1973.

== Births ==
- 13 January – Liv Corfixen, actress
- 27 August - Anne Sofie Espersen, actress

== See also ==
- 1973 in Denmark
