= 1975 in Danish television =

This is a list of Danish television related events from 1975.

== Births ==
- 7 July - Adam Duvå Hall, comedian & TV & radio host
- 3 August – Line Kruse, actress
- 23 September – Lærke Winther Andersen, actress
- 6 October – Oliver Bjerrehuus, model & TV host

== See also ==
- 1975 in Denmark
