= 1985 in Danish television =

This is a list of Danish television related events from 1985.

== Events ==
- 9 March – Hot Eyes are selected to represent Denmark at the 1985 Eurovision Song Contest with their song "Sku' du spørg' fra no'en?". They are selected to be the eighteenth Danish Eurovision entry during Dansk Melodi Grand Prix held at the DR Studios in Copenhagen.

== Births ==
- 7 March – Christopher Læssø, actor & TV host
- 28 May – Ena Spottag, actress

== See also ==
- 1985 in Denmark
