= Tools Design =

Tools Design is a Danish design studio founded by partners Claus Jensen and Henrik Holbæk. The studio was founded in 1989 and do work in the area of consumer products and furniture. The design studio is among the most awarded in Denmark.

Tools Design has worked for Eva Solo, Georg Jensen, Scanglobe, Skybar, Bionaire, Coloplast and others.
