= 1989 in Danish television =

This is a list of Danish television related events from 1989.

== Events ==
- 25 March – Birthe Kjær is selected to represent Denmark at the 1989 Eurovision Song Contest with her song "Vi maler byen rød". She is selected to be the twenty-second Danish Eurovision entry during Dansk Melodi Grand Prix held at the Bella Center in Copenhagen.

== Channels ==
Launches:

- Unknown: Discovery Channel
- Unknown: TV Midtvest
- 10 January: TV 2/Fyn
- 5 February: Eurosport 1
- 1 April: TV 2/Nord
- 27 August: TV1000

== Births ==
- 15 September – Thomas Ernst, actor
- 22 September – Sofie Linde, actress & TV host.

== See also ==
- 1989 in Denmark
