= 1988 in Danish television =

This is a list of Danish television related events from 1988.

== Events ==
- 27 February - Hot Eyes are selected to represent Denmark at the 1988 Eurovision Song Contest with their song "Ka' du se hva' jeg sa'?". They are selected to be the twenty-first Danish Eurovision entry during Dansk Melodi Grand Prix held at the DR Studios in Copenhagen.
- 1 October - TV2 starts broadcasting, thereby ending the 37-year monopoly held by DR on national television broadcasting.

== Debuts ==
- Sytten-nul-dut
- Lykkehjulet
- TV2 Sport
- TV2 News
- Nana
- Benjamin Blümchen
- Eleva2ren
- DR-Derude
- Hund og hund imellem

== Births ==
- 18 September - Lukas Forchhammer, singer, songwriter and actor

== See also ==
- 1988 in Denmark
