= 1977 in Danish television =

This is a list of Danish television related events from 1977.

== Births ==
- 6 April – Ditte Ylva Olsen, actress
- 25 April – Eva Harlou, TV host
- 29 May – Lene Beier, TV host.
- 2 June – Signe Molde-Amelung, TV host
- 2 November – Thomas Voss, actor
- 16 November – Vicki Berlin, actress
- 2 December – David Owe, actor

== See also ==
- 1977 in Denmark
