= 2011 cloudburst in Denmark =

Cloudburst on 2 July 2011 in parts of Zealand and the Greater Copenhagen area

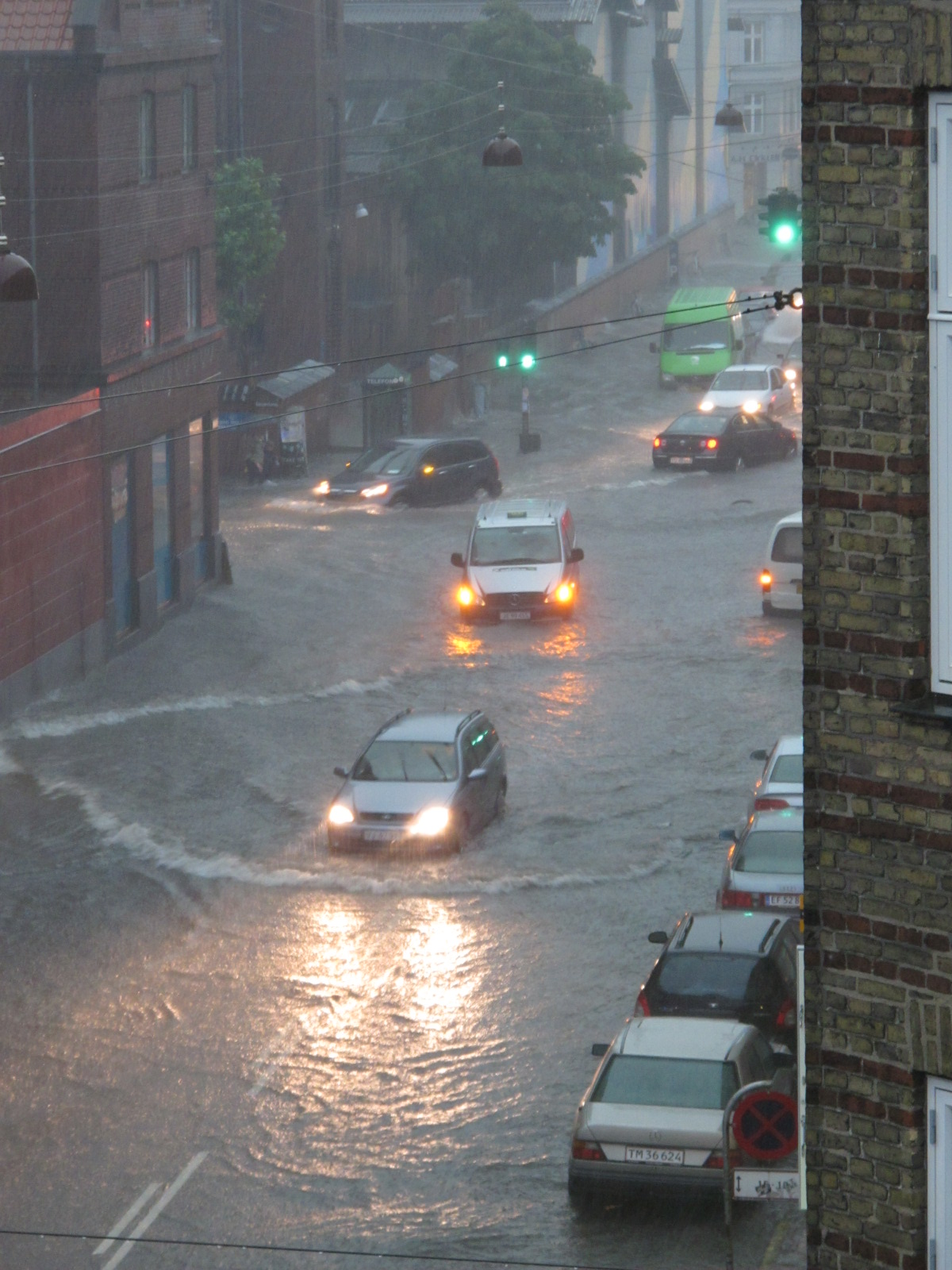
- Istedgade street in central Copenhagen during the cloudburst
- Date: 2 July 2011; 14 years ago
- Location: Denmark

On 2 July 2011, a cloudburst hit parts of Zealand and the Greater Copenhagen area of Denmark. This resulted in the greatest recorded rainfall in 24 hours in the past 55 years. It caused an estimated DKK 7 billion in damage, notably including structural failures at the 17th-century fortress, Kastellet.

== Cloudburst ==
The Danish Meteorological Institute (DMI) forecast a cloudburst on 2 July 2011 but did not expect the strength of the cloudburst that formed. Rainfall in the Greater Copenhagen area was measured at 135.4 mm (5.33 in) on 2 July. This was the greatest recorded rainfall in 24 hours in the past 55 years. The previous record was 111.7 mm (4.40 in) measured in Ordrup, a suburb in the north of Copenhagen, on 1 August 1959.

The cloudburst started in Hellerup at c. 19:00 and traveled in a south-westerly trajectory for approximately two hours, before dissipating north of Køge.

In Zealand, more than 5,000 lightning strikes were recorded in three hours.

Jørn Thomsen, a meteorologist for the DMI, described the cloudburst as the strongest ever measured in Copenhagen.

== Consequences ==
=== Health ===
The trauma center at Rigshospitalet had to be moved to Herlev Hospital after mud and water penetrated the facility and damaged equipment. At Hvidovre Hospital patients in the emergency department were sent home and management discussed whether to evacuate the entire hospital, including 450 bed-bound patients.

A 2012 study of 257 workers who participated in the clean-up of the flood found that 22 per cent (56) became ill afterward.

A 62-year-old man died on 19 July after contracting the rare disease leptospirosis. Danish medical research institute Statens Serum Institut stated that the infection probably occurred through contact with sewage water whilst cleaning a flooded basement after the cloudburst. Another case of leptospirosis was identified.

The World Health Organization's European headquarters were closed after parts of the offices were flooded.

=== Economy ===
The City of Copenhagen Parks and Nature Department estimated that the cloudburst caused DKK 6 billion ($1.04 billion) worth of damage.

The incident resulted in 90,644 insurance claims, with the value of the claims totaling DKK 4.88 billion.

=== Buildings and structures ===
The historic fortress Kastellet was badly damaged by floods following the cloudburst. In several places, the ramparts collapsed and several floors were destroyed.

=== Transport ===
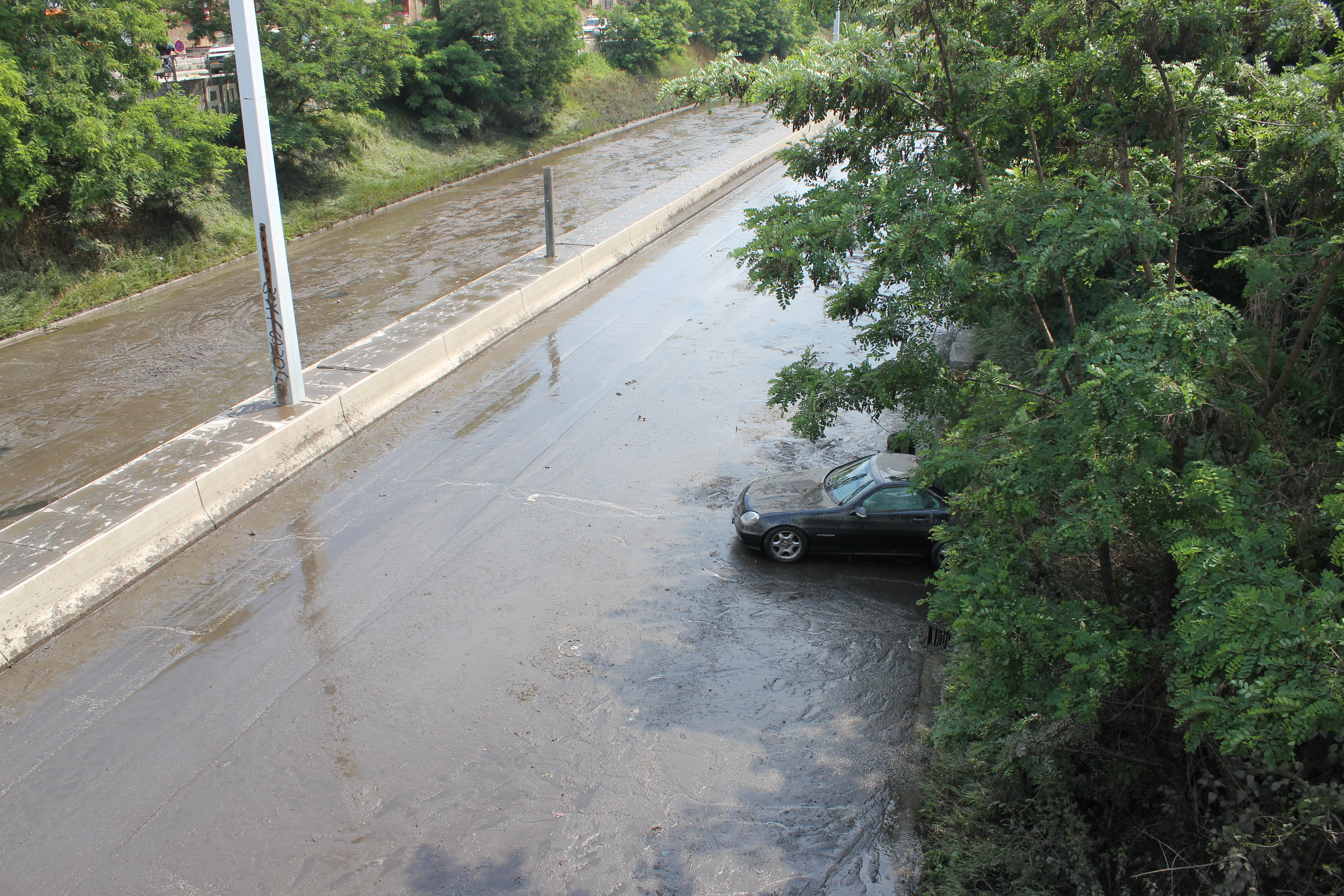
The Helsingør motorway on 3 July

The Helsingør motorway was blocked in both directions from Kildegårdsvej to Hans Knudsens Plads on 2 July. The Danish Emergency Management Agency (DEMA) pumped the water overnight on 3 July and the road was reopened on the morning of 4 July.

Despite its location in underground tunnels, the Copenhagen Metro did not experience any operational problems, except that the elevators stopped working.

== Reforms ==
In May 2012, Copenhagen joined the United Nations Making Cities Resilient campaign.
