= 1987 in Danish television =

This is a list of Danish television related events from 1987.

== Events ==
- 28 February – Anne-Cathrine Herdorf & Bandjo are selected to represent Denmark at the 1987 Eurovision Song Contest with their song "En lille melodi". They are selected to be the twentieth Danish Eurovision entry during Dansk Melodi Grand Prix held at the Tivolis Koncertsal in Copenhagen.

== Births ==
- 8 February – Esben Bjerre Hansen, TV & radio host.

== See also ==
- 1987 in Denmark
