= 1986 in Danish television =

This is a list of Danish television related events from 1986.

== Events ==
- 22 February – Lise Haavik is selected to represent Denmark at the 1986 Eurovision Song Contest with her song "Du er fuld af løgn". She is selected to be the nineteenth Danish Eurovision entry during Dansk Melodi Grand Prix held at the DR Studios in Copenhagen.

== Births ==
- 21 January – Johannes Nymark, actor & singer
- 4 March – Amanda Collin, actress.
- 26 September – Stephania Potalivo, actress

== See also ==
- 1986 in Denmark
