= 1980 in Danish television =

This is a list of Danish television related events from 1980.

== Events ==
- 29 March – Bamses Venner are selected to represent Denmark at the 1980 Eurovision Song Contest with their song "Tænker altid på dig". They are selected to be the thirteenth Danish Eurovision entry during Dansk Melodi Grand Prix held at the Falkoner Theatre in Copenhagen.

== Births ==
- 5 June – Lisbeth Østergaard, TV & radio host
- 16 June – Sara Maria Franch-Mærkedahl, weathergirl

== Deaths ==
- 3 September – Dirch Passer, 54, actor and comedian, cardiac arrest.

== See also ==
- 1980 in Denmark
