= Mogens E. Pedersen =

Danish journalist (1928–2014)

- Born: Mogens Emil Pedersen; 9 May 1928; Denmark
- Died: 5 January 2014 (aged 85); Gentofte Municipality, Denmark
- Other name: Mogens Pedersen
- Occupation: Journalist
- Years active: 1949–97

Mogens Emil Pedersen, nickname MEP (9 May 1928 – 5 January 2014) was a Danish journalist. He died on 5 January 2014, aged 85, in Gentofte Municipality.

== Career ==
In 1970, Pedersen became editor-in-chief to Se & Hør until his retirement in 1997.
