= TV3 Sport 2 =

Danish TV channel

- Country: Denmark
- Broadcast area: Denmark
- Network: TV3
- Headquarters: Copenhagen, Denmark

Programming
- Language: Danish
- Picture format: 576i (16:9 SDTV); 1080i (HDTV)

Ownership
- Owner: Modern Times Group / Viasat Danmark
- Sister channels: TV3 Sport 1

History
- Launched: 5 February 2013
- Closed: 31 October 2017
- Replaced by: TV3 MAX

Links
- Website: www.tv3sport.dk

TV3 Sport 2 was a Danish TV channel dedicated to sports which was launched on February 5, 2013. The channel was owned by Modern Times Group and was a sister channel of TV3 Sport 1. TV3 Sport 2 broadcast the Danish Superliga and UEFA Champions League in football as well as darts, athletics, golf, speedway and many other sports.

== History ==
On August 23, 2017, Viasat Danmark and Modern Times Group announced that TV3 Sport 2 closes on 31 October 2017 in favour of a broader men’s channel called TV3 MAX. All sports programming broadcast on TV3 Sport 2 will be taken over by TV3 MAX, which will also show series like Top Gear, The Simpsons and How I Met Your Mother. Viewers who have access to TV3 Sport 2 will automatically access TV3 MAX.
