= Voice – Danmarks største stemme =

Danish reality singing competition

- Created by: John de Mol Jr. Roel van Velzen
- Presented by: Morten Resen; Felix Smith
- Judges: Steen Jørgensen; Lene Nystrøm; Sharin Foo; L.O.C. Xander
- Country of origin: Denmark
- Original language: Danish
- No. of seasons: Regular: 2 Junior: 7

Production
- Producer: Talpa Media Group

Original release
- Network: TV2 (2011-2012, 2014-2017); Kanal 5 (2019-2026)
- Release: 26 November 2011 – 24 November 2012
- Release: 2 April 2014 – 22 June 2019

Voice – Danmarks største stemme is a Danish reality singing competition, based on the original Dutch television program The Voice of Holland. It started on November 26, 2011, and is currently airing on TV2. One of the important premises of the show is the quality of the singing talent. Four coaches, themselves popular performing artists, train the talents in their group and occasionally perform with them. Talents are selected in blind auditions, where the coaches cannot see, but only hear the auditioner. The show was canceled after two seasons in order to make way for a kids' version, known as Voice Junior.

== Format ==
The series consists of three phases: a blind audition, a battle phase, and live performance shows. Four judges/coaches, all noteworthy recording artists, choose teams of contestants through a blind audition process. Each judge has the length of the auditioner's performance (about one minute) to decide if he or she wants that singer on his or her team; if two or more judges want the same singer (as happens frequently), the singer has the final choice of coach.

Each team of singers is mentored and developed by its respective coach. In the second stage, called the battle phase, coaches have two of their team members battle against each other directly by singing the same song together, with the coach choosing which team member to advance from each of four individual "battles" into the first live round. Within that first live round, the surviving four acts from each team again compete head-to-head, with public votes determining one of two acts from each team that will advance to the final eight, while the coach chooses which of the remaining three acts comprises the other performer remaining on the team.

In the final phase, the remaining contestants (Final 20) compete against each other in live broadcasts. The television audience and the coaches have equal say 50/50 in deciding who moves on to the Top 4 phase. With one team member remaining for each coach, the (Top 4) contestants compete against each other in the finale with the outcome decided solely by public vote.

== Coaches and finalists ==
– Winning coach/contestant. Winner in bold, eliminated contestants in small font.
– Runner-up coach/contestant. Final contestant first listed.
– Third place coach/contestant. Final contestant first listed.
– Fourth place coach/contestant. Final contestant first listed.

Season	Coaches			
Season	L.O.C.	Sharin Foo	Lene Nystrøm	Steen Jørgensen
1	- **Kim Wagner**; - Noa Sophie Stoustrup; - Joakim Tranberg; - Martin Preisler; - Rebecca Melodee Ndigaye	- Bjarne Langhoff; - Freja Kirk; - Amie Jones; - Frederik Meyer-Zeuteh; - Stella Danielsen	- Mathias Rønne Pachler; - Rosa Skotte; - Ida Lohmann; - Henrik Bruhm; - Thomas Solnæs	- Liv Skotte; - Nanna Kaad; - Thomas Pedersen; - Dea Romme Larsen; - Nadia Bach
2	L.O.C.	Lene Nystrøm	Xander Linnet	Sharin Foo
2	- **Emilie Paevatalu**; - Johannes Hübertz; - Anders Gøttsch; - Tanja Fossdal; - Myanoa Schneider; - Evi Jakobsen; - Anna Hansen; - Winnie Doktor	- Dianna Lindharth; - Christoffer Stjerne; - Mette Berg; - Nanna Larsen; - Louise Bjerre; - Tifanie Haick; - Jakob Wredstrøm; - Mads Lumholt	- Christian Krogh Sørensen; - Louise Schouw; - Søs Haals; - Jean Paul Espinosa; - Celine Broadbent; - Emilie Roskjær Toft; - Michelle Nørlev Larsen; - Tommy Jensen	- Andreas Odbjerg; - Kamille B. Schjøter; - Susan Dervishi; - Josias Juliussen; - Sofus Jensen; - Izabella Dzuibek; - Malene Pedersen; - Søren Jørgensen

== Season summary ==
Voice - Danmarks største stemme series overview
Season	First aired	Last aired	Winner	Runner-up	Third place	Fourth place	Winning coach	Presenter	Backstage presenter	Coaches (chairs' order)			
Season	First aired	Last aired	Winner	Runner-up	Third place	Fourth place	Winning coach	Presenter	Backstage presenter	1	2	3	4
1	26 Nov 2011	25 Feb 2012	Kim Wagner	Mathias Pachler	Bjarne Langhoff	Liv Skotte	L.O.C.	Morten Resen	Sigurd Larsen	L.O.C.	Sharin	Lene	Steen
2	15 Sep 2012	24 Nov 2012	Emilie Paevatalu	Andreas Odbjerg	Christian Sørensen	Dianna Lindharth	L.O.C.	Felix Smith		L.O.C.	Lene	Xander	Sharin

== Season 1 (2011–12) ==
The coaches for the debut seasons are four famous singers of the country: Steen Jørgensen, lead singer of Sort Sol, Lene Nystrøm, leadgirl of Aqua, Sharin Foo, one half of the duo The Raveonettes and rapper Liam O'Connor, who is famous as L.O.C. It was hosted by Morten Resen. Sigurd Kongshøj Larsen presented the backstage segments. Among the contestants in this edition are Amie Jones, who was an X-Factor reject twice in a row, and Nanna Kaad - who rose to fame as a professional impersonator of Sharin Foo. Mathias Rønne Pachler and Joakim Tranberg gained huge popularity after confirming that they fell in love with each other during the course of the show and therefore became the first gay-homosexual couple on Danish reality TV.

== Season 2 (2012) ==
Three of the four coaches returned for a second season. They were L.O.C., Sharin Foo (one half of the duo The Raveonettes) and Lene Nystrøm. However, Steen Jørgensen (from the band Sort Sol) was replaced in season 2 by the Danish singer Xander. The series was hosted by Felix Smith. Mattias Hundebøll presented the backstage segments. The series was won by Emelie Paevatalu from Team Liam (L.O.C.) making him the winning coach for the second consecutive season. Andreas Odbjerg of Team Xander was runner up. Christian Krogh Sørensen of Team Lene came third and Dianna Lindharth of Team Sharin fourth.

== Kids version ==
Voice Junior is a Danish talent show that is broadcast on TV2, based on the Dutch edition "The Voice Kids", which is a spin-off of the original "The Voice" format. Unlike the adult version, participants are only between 8 and 14 years old. Similar to Voice – Danmarks største stemme, the contestant would sing popular hits in front of famous singers who would select them to fill up their teams. The three coaches of Voice Junior are Oh Land, Wafande, and Joey Moe.

In the Blind Audition, the three coaches' chairs rotate to the back of the stage and therefore the coaches cannot see who is singing. After these Blind Auditions, all of the participants must face each other in a "Battle". The coaches group three candidates into a battle and then must select one to send through to the quarterfinals, and then one in the semifinal. Eventually, each coach has a participant in the final. After the viewers have voted, the winner is announced.

From the third season, the programs went live from the quarterfinals, and it was the viewers who chose who passed on via SMS.

In December 2018, it was announced that the show would move to Kanal 5 starting in 2019.

From the sixth season, the rules changed in the quarter-final and semi-final the coaches decide who will go through to the next round and in the final, the fans in the auditorium with their mobile phones decides who will win.

=== Coaches' timeline ===
Coach	Seasons					
Coach	1	2	3	4	5	6
Joey Moe						
Wafande						
Oh Land						
Mette Lindberg						

=== Season summary ===
Danish Voice Junior series overview
Season	First aired	Last aired	Winner	Runner-up	Third place	Winning coach	Presenters		Coaches (chairs' order)			Network
Season	First aired	Last aired	Winner	Runner-up	Third place	Winning coach	Presenters		1	2	3	Network
1	2 Apr 2014	23 May 2014	Melina Neustrup Nielsen	Rud Aslak	Sille Bay Gercke	Joey Moe	Mikkel Kryger	Emilie Paevatalu	Wafande	Oh Land	Joey	TV 2
2	24 Sep 2014	23 Nov 2014	Åland Mustafa	Isabella Vahle	Sophie Breum	Joey Moe	Mikkel Kryger	Emilie Paevatalu	Wafande	Oh Land	Joey	TV 2
3	5 Sep 2015	31 Oct 2015	Isabel Brogaard	Ella Marie	Johanne Rosenmeier	Joey Moe	Mikkel Kryger	Amelia Høy	Wafande	Oh Land	Joey	TV 2
4	14 Sep 2016	24 Oct 2016	Oliver Arndt	Freja Larsen	Karoline Dalgaard	Oh Land	Mikkel Kryger	Amelia Høy	Wafande	Oh Land	Joey	TV 2
5	9 Sep 2017	4 Nov 2017	Dafne Nielsen	Merle Meyland	Kamille Eliassen	Oh Land	Mikkel Kryger	Stephania Potalivo	Oh Land	Wafande	Joey	TV 2
6	20 Apr 2019	22 June 2019	Camille Beck	Katrine Larsen	Nicklas Jørgensen	Wafande	Jacob Riising	Ihan Hayder	Wafande	Mette	Joey	Kanal 5

== See also ==
- The Voice (franchise)
