= Television in Denmark =

Television in Denmark began in the early 1950s and for several decades was dominated by a public-service monopoly. Since the late 1980s the Danish television market has been plural, with the creation of TV 2, the growth of commercial channels, the transition to digital terrestrial broadcasting, and changes to public funding.

== History ==
The first television broadcasts in Denmark started on 2 October 1951. These were carried out by the national radio broadcaster Statsradiofonien and consisted of a one-hour broadcast three times per week. The broadcasts were initially limited to a few hundred homes in the capital area.

Daily broadcasts started in 1954. With the opening of the Gladsaxe transmitter, most of Zealand could watch television. The entire country was covered in 1960 when the transmitter on Bornholm opened. Statsradiofonien was renamed Danmarks Radio (DR) in 1959.

The first news programme, TV-Avisen, started in 1965. Colour television started test transmissions in 1967, with colour television becoming the norm in filming and broadcasting from 1970 on.

In 1983, DR started trials with the regional television station TV Syd. Local television started in many parts of the country, challenging the DR monopoly. The monopoly on national television ended on 1 October 1988, when TV 2 started. TV 2 was located in Odense on Funen and received funding from both advertising and the television license. Eight regional stations were established within TV 2, one of which was TV Syd. Interrupting programmes for commercials was illegal, so commercials were broadcast between the programmes.

The first private satellite channel broadcasting in the Scandinavian languages had started in 1987 and was known as TV3. A separate Danish version started in 1990. TV3 was broadcasting from the United Kingdom and could therefore avoid the Danish advertising laws. TV3 launched a sister channel known as 3+ in 1996, by merging its two former channels TV6 and ZTV.

DR launched a satellite channel on 30 August 1996. It was known as DR2, and the first channel changed its name to DR1 accordingly.

The local television stations weren't allowed to network, which meant that two stations couldn't show one programme at the same time. In 1997, the rules were relaxed, allowing the stations to simulcast a programme at the same time. This gave birth to the TV Danmark network.

TV 2 started a second channel in 2000. It was known as TV 2 Zulu and was a solely commercial venture. It was initially a free channel, but was changed into a pay channel in 2003. TV 2 has since launched various pay channels such as TV 2 Charlie, TV 2 Film and TV 2 News.

SBS, owners of TV Danmark, launched a sister channel called TV Danmark 1 in 2002. The original channel became TV Danmark 2. Just as TV3 and TV3+, TV Danmark 1 was broadcast from the UK. On 4 April 2004, TV Danmark 1 became Kanal 5. TV Danmark was renamed Kanal 4 on 3 April 2006 and left the terrestrial network on 1 January 2007. It was replaced by SBS Net, owned by the same company.

As both DR and TV 2 are owned by the state, the state-owned broadcasters have a relatively high viewing share, by European standards. When a new centre-right government was elected in 2001, it announced that it would privatize TV 2 within 100 days. This failed, but TV 2 was transformed into a government-owned public company (aktieselskab) in 2003. TV 2 received license funding for the national channel for the last time in 2004.

== Digital terrestrial television ==
DTT had its technical launch in Denmark in March 2006 after some years of public trials. The official launch was at midnight on November 1, 2009, where the analogue broadcasts shut down nationwide.

As of June 2020, five national multiplexes are available. MUX 1 is owned by DIGI-TV I/S (joint-venture between DR and TV 2) but is operated by Teracom A/S, broadcasting free-to-air channels only. MUX 2 - 5 are owned and operated by Boxer broadcasting encrypted pay-TV only.

== Viewing shares ==
Viewing shares for different channels, according to TNS-Gallup.

* The figures for 2009 only concern the weeks up to 26 April.

| Channels | 2000 | 2001 | 2002 | 2003 | 2004 | 2005 | 2006 | 2007 | 2008 | 2009* |
|---|---|---|---|---|---|---|---|---|---|---|
| DR1 | 28.9 | 27.6 | 28.4 | 29.8 | 29.8 | 28.0 | 27.7 | 26.4 | 24.6 | 23.9 |
| DR2 | 2.9 | 3.3 | 3.7 | 3.8 | 4.2 | 4.7 | 4.7 | 4.6 | 4.1 | 4.7 |
| DR Update | - | - | - | - | - | - | - | - | 0.2 | 0.3 |
| TV 2 | 36.1 | 34.7 | 35.3 | 35.2 | 35.0 | 35.8 | 34.2 | 33.4 | 31.2 | 30.2 |
| TV 2 Zulu | 0.3 | 2.2 | 3.1 | 2.1 | 2.5 | 2.8 | 3.0 | 2.5 | 2.3 | 2.3 |
| TV 2 Charlie | - | - | - | - | 0.2 | 1.0 | 2.0 | 2.7 | 2.4 | 2.6 |
| TV 2 Film | - | - | - | - | - | 0.2 | 0.8 | 1.1 | 1.1 | 1.2 |
| TV 2 News | - | - | - | - | - | - | - | 0.7 | 1.8 | 2.4 |
| Viasat Sport/TV 2 Sport HD | - | - | 0.4 | 0.4 | 0.4 | 0.4 | 0.4 | 0.8 | 1.1 | 1.2 |
| TV3 | 9.1 | 8.0 | 7.2 | 6.6 | 6.0 | 5.4 | 5.0 | 5.3 | 4.9 | 4.7 |
| TV3+ | 3.3 | 3.6 | 3.5 | 3.5 | 3.5 | 3.6 | 3.7 | 3.7 | 3.6 | 3.1 |
| TV3 Puls | - | - | - | - | - | - | - | - | - | 0.3 |
| TVDanmark 2/Kanal 4 | 5.1 | 6.3 | 4.8 | 4.7 | 4.3 | 3.9 | 3.1 | 1.2 | 1.7 | 1.8 |
| TVDanmark 1/Kanal 5 | 1.9 | 2.3 | 2.2 | 1.9 | 2.3 | 2.3 | 2.5 | 2.6 | 2.9 | 2.9 |
| SBS Net/6'eren | - | - | - | - | - | - | - | 1.0 | 1.0 | 1.3 |
| The Voice TV | - | - | - | - | - | - | - | - | 0.3 | 0.3 |
| Discovery Channel | - | - | - | 1.3 | 1.1 | 1.1 | 1.3 | 1.3 | 1.3 | 1.3 |
| Animal Planet | - | - | - | - | - | - | - | - | 0.6 | 0.6 |

== See also ==
- List of television stations in Denmark
- Danish television drama
