= 2005 in Danish television =

List of years in Danish television
- … 1995; 1996; 1997; 1998; 1999; 2000; 2001; 2002; 2003; 2004; 2005; 2006; 2007; 2008; 2009; 2010; 2011; 2012; 2013; 2014; 2015 …
- Art; Archaeology; Architecture; Literature; Music; Philosophy; Science; +...

This is a list of Danish television related events from 2005.

== Events ==
- 12 February - Jakob Sveistrup is selected to represent Denmark at the 2005 Eurovision Song Contest with his song "Tænder på dig". He is selected to be the thirty-third Danish Eurovision entry during Dansk Melodi Grand Prix held at the Forum Horsens in Horsens.
- 1 April - Jill Liv Nielsen becomes the winner of Big Brother Reality All-Stars which was the last season of the reality television show to air on TV Danmark.
- 4 June - Klovn actress Mia Lyhne and her partner Thomas Evers Poulsen win the first season of Vild med dans.
- 25 November - The Eagle actor David Owe and his partner Vickie Jo Ringgaard win the second season of Vild med dans.

== Debuts ==
- 7 February - Klovn (2005-2009)
- 16 April - Vild med dans (2005–present)

== Television shows ==
=== 1990s ===
- Hvem vil være millionær? (1999–present)

=== 2000s ===
- The Eagle (2004-2006)

== Ending this year ==
- Big Brother (2001-2005, 2012–2014)

== Channels ==
Launches:

- 24 April: Viasat Sport 24
- May: MTV
- 1 November: TV 2 Film

Conversions and rebrandings:

- Canal+ Film 1 to Canal+ Film

== See also ==
- 2005 in Denmark
