= 2000 in Danish television =

List of years in Danish television
- … 1990; 1991; 1992; 1993; 1994; 1995; 1996; 1997; 1998; 1999; 2000; 2001; 2002; 2003; 2004; 2005; 2006; 2007; 2008; 2009; 2010 …
- Art; Archaeology; Architecture; Literature; Music; Philosophy; Science; +...

This is a list of Danish television related events from 2000.

== Events ==
- 13 May – Denmark wins the 45th Eurovision Song Contest in Stockholm, Sweden. The winning song is "Fly on the Wings of Love", performed by Olsen Brothers.

== Debuts ==
=== Domestic ===
- 1 October - Rejseholdet (DR) (2000–2004)
- Hotellet (DR) (2000–2002)

=== International ===
- (Japan) Pokémon

== Television shows ==
- The Fairytaler (1998–2003)
- Robinson Ekspeditionen (1998–present)

== Channels ==
Launches:

- 1 January: Cartoon Network
- 1 January: TV Danmark 1
- 1 September: Star! Scandinavia
- 15 October: TV 2 Zulu

== See also ==
- 2000 in Denmark
