= 2002 in Denmark =

- Decades: 1980s; 1990s; 2000s; 2010s; 2020s
- See also: Other events of 2002; List of years in Denmark

Events from the year 2002 in Denmark.

== Incumbents ==
- Monarch – Margrethe II
- Prime minister – Anders Fogh Rasmussen

== Events ==
- 19 October – The first phase of the Copenhagen Metro, running from Nørreport to Lergravsparken, is opened by Queen Margrethe II.
- 12 December – A European Council is held in the Bella Center, Copenhagen, an agreement is reached for May 2004 enlargement.

== Culture ==
=== Film ===
- The Riber Award film festival at Aalborg University is established.

=== Media ===
- 15 February – It is announced that Erik Refner from Berlingske Tidende wins the World Press Photo of the Year award for a picture of the body of an Afghan refugee being prepared for burial.
- 22 October – The newspaper Dagen is founded.

=== Music ===
- 9 February – Dansk Melodi Grand Prix 2002
- 25 May – For the first time Denmark came last in Eurovision Song Contest receiving only 7 points, although song "Tell Me Who You Are" by Malene Mortensen was one of favourites to win.
- 4 October – Dåbens Pagt (Pact of the Baptism) by Frederik Magle is premiered at the christening of Prince Felix of Denmark

== Sports ==
=== Badminton ===
- 5–9 March – Camilla Martin wins gold in Women's Single at the 92nd All England Open.
- 13–20 April – With five gold medals, two silver medals and four bronze medias, Denmark finishes as the best nation at the 18th European Badminton Championships in Malmö, Sweden.

=== Cycling ===
- 6 October – Jakob Piil wins 2002 Paris–Tours.
- Date unknown – Matthew Gilmore (BEL) and Scott McGrory (AUS) wins the Six Days of Copenhagen Six-day track cycling race.

=== Equestrian sports ===
- 10 September – Rikke Laumann wins a silver medalin Women's vaulting at the 2002 FEI World Equestrian Games.

=== Football ===
- 9 May – OB wins the 2001–02 Danish Cup by defeating F.C. Copenhagen 2–1 in the final.
- 31 May – June 39 – Denmark participates in the 2002 FIFA World Cup in Japan and South Korea.
  - 1 June – Denmark defeats Uruguay 2–1 in their first match in Group A of the initial group stage.
  - 6 June – Denmark draws against Senegal in their second group stage match.
  - 11 June – Denmark wins group A by defeating France 2–0 in their last group stage match and is ready for the knockout stage.
  - 16 June – Denmark is defeated 3–0 by England in the Round of 16 and is finished in the tournament.

=== Golf ===
- 26 May – Anders Hansen wins the BMW PGA Championship on the 2002 European Tour.
- 30 June – Søren Hansen wins Murphy's Irish Open on the 2002 European Tour.
- 1 September – Thomas Bjørn wins the BMW International Open on the 2002 European Tour.
- 27 October – Steen Tinning wins Telefónica Open de Madrid on the 2002 European Tour.

=== Handball ===
- 3 February – Denmark wins bronze at the 2002 European Men's Handball Championship by defeating Iceland 20–22 in the third place play-offs.
- 6–15 December – 2002 European Women's Handball Championship takes place in Denmark.
  - 15 December Denmark wins gold by defeating Norway 25–22 in the final.

=== Other ===
- 16 June – Tom Kristensen wins the 2002 24 Hours of Le Mans as part of the Audi team, his fourth win of the 24 Hours of Le Mans race.
- 11 August – Wilson Kipketer wins gold in Men's 800 metres at the 2002 European Athletics Championships in Munich, Germany.
- 29 November – Mikkel Kessler fights for his first championship and defeats former WBC super middleweight champion Dingaan Thobela over twelve rounds to become IBA champion.

== Births ==
=== January–March ===
- 7 January – Mohamed Daramy, footballer
- 13 January – Frederik Vesti, racing driver
- 17 January – Yousef Salech, footballer

=== April–June ===
- 15 April – Mathias Kvistgaarden, footballer
- 14 May – Kristoffer Lund, soccer player

=== July–September ===
- 22 July – Count Felix of Monpezat
- 23 July – Laura Ziegler, basketball player
- 28 July – Mads Hansen, footballer

=== October–December ===
- 19 November – Anton Gaaei, football player
- 16 December – Victor Kristiansen, footballer
- 21 December – Clara Tauson, tennis player

== Deaths ==
- 12 February – John Eriksen, Danish football player (b. 1957)
- 12 August – Knud Lundberg, football player (born 1920)

== See also ==
- 2002 in Danish television
