= Engelina =

Danish singer and songwriter

- Born: Engelina Andrina Larsen; 1978 (age 47–48); Bornholm, Denmark
- Genres: Pop, eurodance, trance, jazz
- Occupations: Singer, songwriter
- Labels: Universal, Nexus Music, Slick.Boutique
- Formerly of: Sha Li Mar

Engelina Andrina Larsen (born 1978) is a Danish singer and songwriter who is best known for writing and providing the vocals for DJ Encore's "I See Right Through to You", which was a number-one hit in her native Denmark.

== Early life ==
Engelina, the daughter of Ann-Cathrin and songwriter Henning Larsen, grew up on Bornholm with her two older sisters. She was originally a jazz and soul singer.

== Career ==
In 1997 she moved from Århus to Copenhagen, where she met producer and disc jockey DJ Encore in 2000 through an employee at Sony/ATV Music Publishing, who suggested that DJ Encore's music would fit well with Engelina's vocal. One of the first songs they worked on together was "I See Right Through to You", which was later chosen as the theme song to the first season of the reality television show Big Brother Denmark in 2001.

After working with DJ Encore, she joined the girl pop trio Sha Li Mar, together with Christina Undhjem (former lead singer in YouKnowWho) and Ida Corr (backing vocals for Gnags among others). The group were part of the band in the fourth season of the prime time television show Venner for livet ("Friends forever") on TV 2 in 2002. They released a self-titled album the same year.

In 2007 she co-wrote the song "Like a Drug", with Cutfather, Jonas Jeberg and Adam Powers for Kylie Minogue's album X. The song was also sent to the A&R of Britney Spears who liked it, but thought it sounded too much like Minogue.

Since 2007 Engelina has written songs also for several other artists, such as Eric Saade, Sash!, Basshunter, Medina, Clemens, The Storm, Svenstrup & Vendelboe, Kato, Electric Lady Lab, Alexander Brown, Anthony Jasmin and Patrick Spiegelberg. She has also worked with Teddy Riley, Busta Rhymes, Thomas Troelsen, Rui da Silva, Gary Barlow, Duné, Rune RK, Roger Sanchez, Fresh I, Pharphar, Pilfinger, Ankerstjerne, Rasmus Seebach, Barbara Moleko, Shaka Loveless, Frederik Nordsø, Fridolin Nordsø, Kay n'Dustry, Matt Schwarz, Nexus Music, Camille Jones, Stine Bramsen, Christopher, Basshunter, Asle Bjorn, Chris Minh Doky, Tue West, Sash Hampenberg, Providers, Cc Sheffield, Aura Dione.

== Discography ==
=== Albums ===
with DJ Encore

- Intuition (2002)

with Sha Li Mar

- Sha Li Mar (2002)

=== Singles ===
with DJ Encore

- "I See Right Through to You" (2001)
- "Walking in the Sky" (2002)
- "High on Life" (2002)
- "You've Got a Way" (2002)

== Songwriting discography ==
Year	Artist	Album	Song
2001	DJ Encore feat. Engelina	Intuition	"Open Your Eyes"
2001	DJ Encore feat. Engelina	Intuition	"I See Right Through to You"
2001	DJ Encore feat. Engelina	Intuition	"High on Life"
2001	DJ Encore feat. Engelina	Intuition	"Talk to Me"
2001	DJ Encore feat. Engelina	Intuition	"Intuition"
2001	DJ Encore feat. Engelina	Intuition	"You've Got a Way"
2001	DJ Encore feat. Engelina	Intuition	"Walking in the Sky"
2001	DJ Encore feat. Engelina	Intuition	"Chemistry"
2001	DJ Encore feat. Engelina	Intuition	"Out There"
2001	DJ Encore feat. Engelina	Intuition	"Show Me"
2001	DJ Encore feat. Engelina	Intuition	"Stay"
2001	DJ Encore feat. Engelina	Intuition	"Another Day"
2003	Mighty House Rocker	"Ragtime in Bollywood (Play with Me)" (single)	"Ragtime in Bollywood (Play with Me)"
2003	Balthazar	"Insanity" (single)	"Insanity"
2004	Moth feat. Engelina	"Foxy" (single)	"Foxy"
2004	Multiple Personalities	"Incredible" (single)	"Incredible"
2004	Maria Lucia	That's Just Me	"Free"
2005	Asle feat. Engelina	"Remedy" (single)	"Remedy"
2006	Cara Dove	"Freak for Love" (single)	"Freak for Love"
2006	Moth	"Jade" (single)	"Jade"
2006	Chris Minh Doky	The Nomad Diaries	"If I Run"
2006	Chris Minh Doky	The Nomad Diaries	"Satellite"
2007	Kylie Minogue	X	"Like a Drug"
2008	Ayoe Angelica	I'm Amazed	"Get a Hold"
2008	Ayoe Angelica	I'm Amazed	"Sugar"
2008	Ayoe Angelica	I'm Amazed	"Face with Nobody"
2008	Ayoe Angelica	I'm Amazed	"Never Drown"
2010	Basshunter	Calling Time	"Saturday"
2010	f(x)	Nu ABO	"Nu ABO"
2011	Super Junior	Mr. Simple	"Opera"
