= Tomboy (disambiguation) =

A tomboy is a girl who behaves according to the gender role of a boy. The term may also refer to:

== Films and television ==
- Tomboy (1936 film), a Chinese film of the 1930s
- Tomboy (1940 film), starring Marcia Mae Jones
- Tomboy (1985 film), a 1985 film starring Betsy Russell
- Tomboy (2008 film), a 2008 animated short film
- Tomboy (2011 film), a 2011 film directed by Céline Sciamma
- Tomboy (2016 film), a 2016 film also known as The Assignment

== Music ==
- Tomboy (band), a Japanese pop music band
- Tomboy (album), the 2011 album by the American musician Panda Bear
  - "Tomboy" (Panda Bear song), a song from the album
- "Tomboy" ((G)I-dle song), 2022
- "Tom Boy", a 1992 song and single by Dutch band Bettie Serveert
- Tomboy, stage name of Thomas Bickham, known for the music video Ok 2 B Gay

== Others ==
- Tomboy (software), an open-source desktop notetaking application
- Tomboy, a 2014 graphic memoir by Liz Prince
- Tomboy, a 1950 novel by Hal Ellson
- Tomboy, Colorado, a ghost town Colorado, United States
- Tomboy stitch or spool knitting, a form of knitting
