= Idols (Danish TV series) season 1 =

Idols
- Season 1
- Hosted by: Tomas Villum Jensen; Uffe Holm
- Judges: Thomas Blachman; Kjeld Wennick; Henriette Blix; Carsten Kroeyer
- Winner: Christian Mendoza
- Runner-up: Mirza Radonjica
- No. of episodes: 19

Release
- Original network: TV3
- Original release: September 1 – December 17, 2003

Season chronology
- Next → Season 2

Idols 2003 was the first season of Idols Denmark. Christian Mendoza won over Mirza Radonjica.

== Finals ==
=== Finalists ===
(ages stated at time of contest)

Contestant	Age	Hometown	Voted Off	Liveshow Theme
Christian Mendoza	16	Copenhagen	Winner	Grand Finale
Mirza Radonjica	17	Nakskov	December 17, 2003	Grand Finale
Kasper Ehlers	19	Lystrup	December 10, 2003	Love Songs
Dorthe K. Hansen	20	Aarhus	December 3, 2003	Christmas Songs / The Beatles
Thomas Kunak Andersen	21	Brøndby	November 26, 2003	Big Band
Lærke Blendstrup	17	Randers	November 19, 2003	Motown
Michael Christensen	17	Horsens	November 12, 2003	Danish Songs
Michael Friis Holm	19	Ringsted	November 5, 2003	1980s
Emil Uhldahl	21	Aarhus	October 29, 2003	Disco
Claus Kruuse	22	Copenhagen	October 22, 2003	Film Songs

=== Live Show Details ===
==== Heat 1 (24 September 2003) ====
Artist	Song (original artists)	Result
Bjarke Madsbøll Klink	"" ()	Eliminated
Christian Mendoza	"" ()	Advanced
Dariana Baez	"" ()	Eliminated
Dorthe K. Hansen	"" ()	Advanced
Johannes Nymark Andersen	"" ()	Eliminated
Kamille Kiesa	"" ()	Eliminated
Katja Stephie Holst Pedersen	"" ()	Eliminated
Louisa Lafifi	"" ()	Eliminated
Michael Friis Holm	"" ()	Advanced
Steven De Oliveira Schumann	"" ()	Eliminated

==== Heat 2 (1 October 2003) ====
Artist	Song (original artists)	Result
Cecilie Fogh Bjørkmann	"Torn" (Natalie Imbruglia)	Eliminated
Ditte Brix Andersson	"How Do I Live" (LeAnn Rimes)	Eliminated
Emil Uldahl	"Ain't Nobody" (Chaka Khan)	Advanced
Emile Bechara	"Heartbreak Hotel" (Elvis Presley)	Eliminated
Katrine Quorning	"Fallin'" (Alicia Keys)	Eliminated
Lærke Blendstrup	"Perhaps Love" (Plácido Domingo & John Denver)	Advanced
Louise Mie Andersen	"Crazy" (Patsy Cline)	Eliminated
Michael Christensen	"Baby Can I Hold You" (Boyzone)	Eliminated
Mirza Radonjica	"Can You Feel the Love Tonight" (Elton John)	Advanced
Ricki Dahl Larsen	"Mustang Sally" (Wilson Pickett)	Eliminated

==== Heat 3 (8 October 2003) ====
Artist	Song (original artists)	Result
Betina Ohland Andersen	"I Turn to You" (Christina Aguilera)	Eliminated
Claus Kruuse	"Flying Without Wings" (Westlife)	Advanced
Kasper Ehlers	"Jessie" (Joshua Kadison)	Advanced
Katja Larsen	"Nobody's Wife" (Anouk)	Eliminated
Kenneth A.N Frandsen	"Angels" (Robbie Williams)	Eliminated
Kiki Dudal Jensen	"Isn't She Lovely" (Stevie Wonder)	Eliminated
Malene Mailand	"Street Life" (Randy Crawford)	Eliminated
Promila Anja Jespersen	"You Gotta Be" (Des'ree)	Eliminated
Thomas Kunak Andersen	"Your Song" (Elton John)	Advanced
Wafande "Fanta" Zaharo	"I'll Make Love to You" (Boyz II Men)	Eliminated

==== Live Show 1 (22 October 2003) ====
Theme: Film Songs

Artist	Song (original artists)	Result
Christian Mendoza	"When a Man Loves a Woman" (Percy Sledge)	Safe
Claus Kruuse	"Can't Fight the Moonlight" (LeAnn Rimes)	Eliminated
Dorthe K. Hansen	"Flashdance... What a Feeling" (Irene Cara)	Bottom three
Emil Uldahl	"Calling You" (Jevetta Steele)	Safe
Kasper Ehlers	"When You Say Nothing at All" (Ronan Keating)	Bottom two
Lærke Blendstrup	"There You'll Be" (Faith Hill)	Safe
Michael Christensen	"I Believe I Can Fly" (R. Kelly)	Safe
Michael Friis Holm	"Ain't No Sunshine" (Bill Withers)	Safe
Mirza Radonjica	"Footloose" (Kenny Loggins)	Safe
Thomas Kunak Andersen	"(I've Had) The Time of My Life" (Bill Medley & Jennifer Warnes)	Safe

==== Live Show 2 (29 October 2003) ====
Theme: Disco

Artist	Song (original artists)	Result
Christian Mendoza	"She's a Bad Mama Jama (She's Built, She's Stacked)" (Carl Carlton)	Safe
Dorthe K. Hansen	"Upside Down" (Diana Ross)	Bottom three
Emil Uldahl	"Boogie Wonderland" (Earth, Wind & Fire)	Eliminated
Kasper Ehlers	"Play That Funky Music" (Wild Cherry)	Bottom two
Lærke Blendstrup	"Hot Stuff" (Donna Summer)	Safe
Michael Christensen	"Love Is in the Air" (John Paul Young)	Safe
Michael Friis Holm	"Stayin' Alive" (Bee Gees)	Safe
Mirza Radonjica	"Car Wash" (Rose Royce)	Safe
Thomas Kunak Andersen	"I Will Survive" (Gloria Gaynor)	Safe

==== Live Show 3 (5 November 2003) ====
Theme: 1980s

Artist	Song (original artists)	Result
Christian Mendoza	"Take On Me" (A-ha)	Safe
Dorthe K. Hansen	"Eternal Flame" (The Bangles)	Bottom three
Kasper Ehlers	"Summer of '69" (Bryan Adams)	Bottom two
Lærke Blendstrup	"What's Love Got to Do with It" (Tina Turner)	Safe
Michael Christensen	"Everytime You Go Away" (Paul Young)	Safe
Michael Friis Holm	"There Must Be an Angel (Playing with My Heart)" (Eurythmics)	Eliminated
Mirza Radonjica	"I Still Haven't Found What I'm Looking For" (U2)	Safe
Thomas Kunak Andersen	"Wake Me Up Before You Go-Go" (Wham!)	Safe

==== Live Show 4 (12 November 2003) ====
Theme: Danish Songs

Artist	Song (original artists)	Result
Christian Mendoza	"Smuk som et stjerneskud" (Olsen Brothers)	Bottom two
Dorthe K. Hansen	"Magi i luften" (Halberg Larsen)	Safe
Kasper Ehlers	"Det er mig der står herude og banker på" (Thomas Helmig)	Safe
Lærke Blendstrup	"Det er ikke det du siger" (Anne Linnet Band)	Safe
Michael Christensen	"Jonathan" (Back to Back)	Eliminated
Mirza Radonjica	"Jeg ved det godt" (Rugsted & Kreutzfeldt)	Safe
Thomas Kunak Andersen	"Pigen med det røde hår" (Dodo and the Dodos)	Safe

==== Live Show 5 (19 November 2003) ====
Theme: Motown

Artist	Song (original artists)	Result
Christian Mendoza	"You Are the Sunshine of My Life" (Stevie Wonder)	Safe
Dorthe K. Hansen	"Signed, Sealed, Delivered I'm Yours" (Stevie Wonder)	Safe
Kasper Ehlers	"My Girl" (The Temptations)	Bottom two
Lærke Blendstrup	"What's Going On" (Marvin Gaye)	Eliminated
Mirza Radonjica	"I Got You (I Feel Good)" (James Brown)	Safe
Thomas Kunak Andersen	"Stand by Me" (Ben E. King)	Safe

==== Live Show 6 (26 November 2003) ====
Theme: Big Band

Artist	Song (original artists)	Result
Christian Mendoza	"For Once in My Life" (Frank Sinatra)	Safe
Dorthe K. Hansen	"They Can't Take That Away from Me" (Frank Sinatra)	Bottom two
Kasper Ehlers	"Bad, Bad Leroy Brown" (Frank Sinatra)	Safe
Mirza Radonjica	"Fly Me to the Moon" (Frank Sinatra)	Safe
Thomas Kunak Andersen	"Everybody Loves Somebody" (Dean Martin)	Eliminated

==== Live Show 7 (3 December 2003) ====
Theme: Christmas / The Beatles

Artist	First song (original artists)	Second song	Result
Christian Mendoza	"White Christmas" (Bing Crosby)	"Yesterday"	Safe
Dorthe K. Hansen	"Winter Wonderland" (Tony Bennett)	"Come Together"	Eliminated
Kasper Ehlers	"Merry Christmas Everyone" (Shakin' Stevens)	"A Day in the Life"	Safe
Mirza Radonjica	"Please Come Home for Christmas" (Charles Brown)	"A Hard Day's Night"	Safe

==== Live Show 8: Semi-final (10 December 2003) ====
Theme: Love Songs

Artist	First song (original artists)	Second song	Result
Christian Mendoza	"Rise & Fall" (Craig David)	"The Greatest Love of All" (George Benson)	Safe
Kasper Ehlers	"As" (Stevie Wonder)	"If You Don't Know Me By Now" (Simply Red)	Eliminated
Mirza Radonjica	"I'm Not in Love" (10cc)	"I'm Still Standing" (Elton John)	Safe

==== Live final (17 December 2003) ====
Artist	First song	Second song	Third song	Result
Christian Mendoza	"Baby Girl"	"She's a Bad Mama Jama (She's Built, She's Stacked)"	"Mystery to Me"	Winner
Mirza Radonjica	"Adrienne"	"Footloose"	"Mystery to Me"	Runner-up
