= 2003 in Danish television =

This is a list of Danish television related events from 2003.

== Events ==
- 2 March - Thomas Bickham is voted winner of Big Brother - V.I.P.
- 1 September - The Danish version of Pop Idol debuts on TV2.
- 15 November - The 1st Junior Eurovision Song Contest is held at the Forum Copenhagen. Croatia wins the contest with the song "Ti si moja prva ljubav" performed by 11-year-old Dino Jelusić.
- 17 December - Christian Mendoza wins the first season of Idols.

== Debuts ==
- 1 September - Idols (2003-2004)

== Television shows ==
=== 1990s ===
- Hvem vil være millionær? (1999–present)

=== 2000s ===
- Big Brother (2001-2005, 2012–2014)

== Channels ==
Launches:

- 28 February: Disney Channel

== See also ==
- 2003 in Denmark
