= Opinions on the Jyllands-Posten Muhammad cartoons controversy =

This page collects opinions, other than those of governments or inter-governmental organizations (see International reactions to the Jyllands-Posten Muhammad cartoons controversy for those), on the Jyllands-Posten Muhammad cartoons controversy. For an overview, and details on the controversy please see the main page.

== Opinions in Denmark ==
=== Polls ===
A poll on January 29, 2006, from Epinion for Danmarks Radio, the national broadcasting company of Denmark, showed that of 579 Danes asked, 79% believe that the Prime Minister of Denmark should not apologise to the Muslims, with 48% citing that would be political interference with the freedom of press, while 44% thought the Prime Minister should try harder to resolve the controversy. 62% of those asked believed that Jyllands-Posten should not apologize either. 58% felt that while it was the right of Jyllands-Posten to publish the images, they could understand the Muslim criticism.

On February 3, 2006, another poll from Epinion made for Danmarks Radio, had asked 509 people "Considering the events that have occurred in the past week, should Jylland-Posten have published the depictions?". 47% said they shouldn't have been published, 46% said the opposite, while the last 7% did not know which stance to take.

=== Should they have been published? ===
The question of whether the drawings should have been printed in the first place has been intensively discussed in Denmark from letters to the editors of news publications, to national television, to open debate meetings at high schools and universities. The controversy arises from several sources:

- Most Islamic traditions forbid representations of Muhammad.
- The satirical nature of some of the drawings was not considered respectful, especially one that shows Muhammad with a bomb in his turban, thereby reinforcing the stereotypical association of Islam with terrorism.
- The drawings upset the Muslim community in Denmark at a time when relations between Muslims and Western society are strained.

=== Criticism ===
The Denmark-based Euro-Mediterranean Human Rights Network said "the cartoons among others [sic] things identified Islam with terrorism, (this) can only increase the xenophobia and racism that these populations are already victims of in Europe. Furthermore, this kind of image contributes to discrediting entire countries and their populations."

Former Danish minister of foreign affairs and ex-chairman of Venstre Uffe Ellemann-Jensen has openly criticized Jyllands-Posten for publishing the drawings. Referring to the cartoons as a "pubertal demonstration", Elleman-Jensen argues that editor-in-chief Carsten Juste has acted irresponsibly and implies that Juste is an incompetent editor. Ellemann-Jensen also argues that Juste should retire from his position as editor of the newspaper.

=== Cartoon editor's statement ===
The editor who originally approved the cartoons, Carsten Juste, later declared that the opponents of free speech had "won" because the furor would almost undoubtedly deter future editors from printing anything similar. He thought it unlikely that anyone would print a caricature of Muhammad within a generation. He also said that, had he known exactly what the consequences would be, that is death threats, boycotts, and terror threats, he would not have printed the cartoons.

=== The cartoonists ===
In early February 2006, Swedish newspaper Dagens Nyheter published an article that focused not on the cartoons but the cartoonists (who were not named). It was based on interviews with a few of the cartoonists, several of whom regretted creating the pictures. Dagens Nyheter also noted that although the cartoons have received worldwide attention and have been published several times, the cartoonists have only earned the initial few hundred Danish kroner each for their work.

=== Reaction to government actions ===
Many people in Denmark have criticized the government's handling of the affair, particularly the prime minister's decision not to meet with the ambassadors from Muslim majority countries in October 2005.

On December 20, 2005, twenty-two former Danish ambassadors sent an open letter to the prime minister criticizing his decision not to open a dialogue with the international representatives.

=== Criticism of Danish media in general ===
A 2004 report by the immigrant rights lobbyist organization, the European Network Against Racism (ENAR), claimed that the Danish media devoted an excessive proportion of their time to the problems posed by immigrants, and most often Islamic immigrants, while often ignoring the problems that these immigrants face. Over the 3-month period studied, from September 1 to November 20, 19 out of the 24 Jyllands-Posten's editorials on "ethnic issues" were negative, while 88 out of 120 op. ed. pieces on "ethnics" were negative, and 121 out of 148 letters to the editor on "ethnics" were negative.

In Denmark, ENAR is represented by Bashy Quraishy, who is a former member of Socialistisk Folkeparti and is known for his apologetic attitude with regards to the 9/11 attacks and for referring to the focus on Islamic fundamentalism during the following investigations as "crusades". The other representative for ENAR in Denmark is Mona Sheikh, who failed to gain a seat in Folketinget representing Det Radikale Venstre when it was discovered that she (even though she doesn't wear a headscarf) was a member of the Minhaj-ul-Quran network.

=== Danish Muslims ===
While generally offended by the cartoons, most members of the Danish Muslim community condemn the violence that the drawings have sparked off in the Middle East, arguing that the state of Denmark is not to be held responsible for the drawings published by Jyllands-Posten.

On February 7, 2006, 300 Danish Muslims and ethnic Danes marched through Gjellerupparken near Århus carrying torches to a demonstration for an increased understanding between the Danish Muslim community and Danish mainstream community. Rabih Azad-Ahmad who organized the demonstration appealed for friendly and open interaction between the Muslim and mainstream Danish communities.

=== Reconciliation ===
The Islamic Society in Denmark proposed that a three-day celebration of Muhammad should be held in Denmark, putting a focus on Muhammad's life. They further proposed that this be coordinated in part by the Islamic Society, Jyllands-Posten, and at least some of the five universities in Denmark. This was declined by the universities, as they do not take part in religious activities.

=== Opinion of the Queen of Denmark ===
In April 2005 the British newspaper, The Daily Telegraph published an article which quoted Queen Margrethe II of Denmark as saying that the Danes have "to show our opposition to Islam". The comment is from the book Margrethe (2005) ISBN 87-567-7027-8.

The statement was however somewhat mistranslated and taken from the following context: [page 197]

There is, as said, something moving about people, whom to this degree surrender to a faith. However there is also something frightening about such a totality, which also is a side of Islam. There must be shown counter-play [interplay of an alternative / sparring], and once in a while you have to run the risk of getting a less flattering label stuck upon you. Because there is certain things before which one should not be tolerant.

The passage as it appeared in The Daily Telegraph was reprinted by the pan-Arabic news paper Al-Hayat, as evidence of Islamophobia in Denmark.

== Opinions of Muslims ==
Some Muslims were angered by the publication of what they considered offensive images. Although the artists have denied representing Muhammad as a terrorist, many Muslims felt that a bomb in a turban, with a lit fuse and the Islamic creed written on the bomb suggested a connection between Muhammad and terrorism.

Some Liberal Muslims, mainly in Europe, have supported the republication of the images so that individual Muslims can make up their own minds and welcomed the debate on the issues that the cartoons have raised.

It has also been pointed out that cartoons in the Arab and Islamic press "demonizing" Jews and Israelis are common.

Louay M. Safi, scholar and Muslim American leaders argued that the cartoons were an exercise in hate, rather than free, speech. Dr. Safi accused Jyllands-Poten editors of hiding behind free speech to promote anti-Muslim feelings and demonize the small but growing Danish Muslim community. He distinguished between free speech that aims at engaging an important issue, and hate speech whose goal is to marginalize and intimidate, and argued that Jyllands-Posten was evidently guilty of the latter.

=== Double standard? ===
Other Arabs and Muslims have expressed their condemnation of the cartoons: "In [the West] it is considered freedom of speech if they insult Islam and Muslims," columnist Mohammed al-Shaibani wrote in Kuwait's Al-Qabas daily on January 30, 2006, "But such freedom becomes racism and a breach of human rights and anti-Semitism if Arabs and Muslims criticize their religion and religious laws."

A number of Muslim commentators, including Ehsan Ahrari of the Asia Times, have pointed at laws in Germany, France, Austria, and seven other countries in Europe which explicitly regard the denial of the Holocaust as a crime, free speech considerations notwithstanding. They maintain that offensive imagery regarding the Jewish religion and the Jewish people is largely prohibited in the media in post-Holocaust Europe. The media in general practices self-restraint in this matter; therefore many Muslims say that a different set of standards applies for the Islamic faith.

=== BBC debate ===
The issue was debated in a BBC news programme by Asghar Bukhari, a founding member of MPACUK, a political movement; and by Roger Koeppel, an editor of Die Welt, a German newspaper that published the cartoons. Bukhari suggested to Koeppel that a German paper would be particularly mindful of the effect of such imagery, considering the lengthy history of antisemitic propaganda and demonization of Jews in German media prior to the Holocaust, when caricatures of Jews as rich financiers or evil Bolsheviks were commonplace. Koeppel replied that he did not consider the caricatures of Muhammad in the same vein.

=== Islamic governments and NGOs ===
The public anger was accompanied by a condemnation from Arabic and Islamic governments as well as Islamic non-governmental organizations (NGOs).

The Justice and Islamic Affairs Minister of the United Arab Emirates, Mohammed Al Dhaheri, called it "cultural terrorism, not freedom of expression", according to the official WAM news agency. "The repercussions of such irresponsible acts will have adverse impact on international relations."

In Tunisia, Abdulaziz Othman Altwaijri, president of the Islamic Organization for Education, Science and Culture (ISESCO, the Islamic world's counterpart to UNESCO) called the drawings a form of racism and discrimination that one must counter by all available means. He said, "It's regrettable to state today, as we are calling for dialogue, that other parties feed animosity and hate and attack sacred symbols of Muslims and of their prophet".

Jordan's largest circulation daily, government-run Al-Rai, said the Danish government must apologize.

Iran's supreme leader Ayatollah Ali Khamenei said on February 6, 2006, that a "Zionist conspiracy" was to blame for the row over the cartoons, in his first reaction to the controversy: "The reason for the Zionist action is because of the loss they suffered by Hamas winning". Khamenai was referring to Hamas victory in the 2006 Palestinian legislative election, which took place in January, several months after the publication of the cartoons.

The condemnations have also come from the General Secretariat of the Organization of Islamic Conference, saying:

It is evident that the intention of Jylland Posten was motivated to incite hatred and violence against Muslims. By exposing the level of understanding of Islamic religion and its symbols the dailies have seriously damaged their credibility in the eyes of Muslim world and harmed democracy, freedom of the press, violated decency and civilized norms.

The Muslim World League called on UN Secretary-General Kofi Annan to activate international laws against insolence toward religion.

=== Holocaust contest ===
Hamshahri, Iran's largest newspaper has announced that it will be holding an "international cartoon contest about the Holocaust" in reaction to the images. The paper's graphics editor said, "The Western papers printed these sacrilegious cartoons on the pretext of freedom of expression, so let's see if they mean what they say and also print these Holocaust cartoons".

=== "Muslims not blameless" ===
However, not all Muslims placed blame entirely on the West.

In Iraq, the country's top Shiite cleric, Grand Ayatollah Ali al-Sistani, decried the drawings but did not call for protests. Al-Sistani suggested that militant Muslims were partly to blame for distorting Islam's image.

In the United Arab Emirates, the periodical Al-Ittihad published an opinion piece which argued that,

The world has come to believe that Islam is what is practiced by Bin Laden, Zawahiri, Zarqawi, the Muslim Brotherhood, the Salafis, and others who have presented a distorted image of Islam. We must be honest with ourselves and admit that we are the reason for these drawings.

Former Iranian president Mohammad Khatami, who is also the theorist of Dialogue Among Civilizations, strongly criticized the Danish cartoons for "spreading hatred", but added that the Muslim world is not entirely blameless either:

Offending and insulting, is different from expressing an opinion that can be analyzed, argued on, and can eventually be accepted or rejected [therefore offending others is not acceptable] ... But in addition to the west, we ourselves also have problems in this regard. Instead of logical criticism or debate, we only keep saying offensive things about liberalism, democracy and modernism. I had told some of our elders before, that the religion of the today's world is 'liberalism' and we have no right to make insults about it. We should not keep using phrases such as "the corrupt culture of the west" etc. in our words. As it's also said in the Holy Koran, "Do not insult the gods of others, otherwise you are indirectly insulting your God".

— February 15, 2006.

=== Bewilderment ===
Certain secular Muslims have expressed bewilderment at the reaction these cartoons have provoked. A Danish member of parliament, Muslim Naser Khader stated, "My impression from different Arabic media is that the dominant position – perhaps surprising for some – can be summarised as follows: We cannot as Muslims dictate that non-Muslims comply with the allegedly prohibited depiction of the prophet." One Arab journalist based in Brussels wrote that "It is perplexing that a few crude cartoons can spark an international crisis overshadowing war, political oppression and economic and social injustice. It has hurt the image of Muslims and reflects poorly on their tolerance."

=== Support for free speech ===
Khaled Diab argues that Muslims cannot impose their own values on people of other faiths. Freedom of expression should permit people to express whatever opinions they have, even if they are offensive, he argues. Yet responsibility, respect, and sensitivity should lead mainstream media outlets to assess the effect the material they plan to publish will have on their readers and society at large.

While condemning the Muslim reaction, Diab also points to "the uglier face of western prejudice" that these cartoons reveal and cautions against smugness in the west. "But people in Europe shouldn't take a holier-than-thou attitude. They would do well to remember that their own record of defending freedom of expression when the views being expressed run contrary to their own has been patchy at best." He refers to Jyllands-Posten's own refusal to publish a cartoon that lampooned Jesus and the continued attempts by various western governments to gag Arab media channels, foremost among the Al Jazeera.

== International opinion ==
According to one analyst, the controversy over the cartoons has resulted in bridging some of the divides that both sides of the "West vs Jihadist" conflict have historically exploited: The rift between the United States and Europe on one side, and the rift between Sunnis and Shiites on the other side. According to this view, the reaction of the Muslims to the cartoons unifies the factions on either side of the global conflict.

Some Muslims have stated in interviews that much of the reaction is because it was unexpected and that many Muslims consider Europe, and especially the Scandinavian countries, as more friendly towards the Arab world than the US, for example.

=== United Kingdom ===
Tariq Ramadan, a member of Tony Blair's committee to combat Islamic extremism, claims to see an "unholy alliance" between the anti-immigrant right wing in Europe and the dictatorial regimes in the Middle East. As the reasoning goes, some seek to portray Muslims as enemies of Western values and incapable of integration in European society. At the same time various dictatorial regimes in the Islamic world seek to unite their populations behind them by creating external enemies, which they claim are attacking Islam. By polarizing the issue, these two groups have increased the division between Islamic and Western society.

British newspapers took an unusually similar editorial line on the issue, agreeing with the government's assessment of the issue. Even those considered on the 'right' criticized the intellectual justifications given by Continental titles.

=== Vatican City ===
The Vatican City released a statement on Offending Religious Sentiments, "The right to freedom of thought and expression, sanctioned by the Declaration of the Rights of Man, cannot imply the right to offend the religious sentiment of believers."... It is also mentioned how government law protects secular symbols (national flags) but ignores respect of religious symbols.

=== UN ===
On February 13, 2006, Mr. Doudou Diène, United Nations Special Rapporteur on contemporary forms of racism, racial discrimination, xenophobia, and related intolerance, reported:

Legally, the Government of every State party to the International Covenant on Civil and Political Rights is bound by three articles dealing with the relationship between freedom of religion and freedom of opinion and expression, namely article 18, which protects freedom of religion, subject to such limitations as are necessary to protect public safety and order or the fundamental rights and freedoms of others (art. 18, para. 3); article 19, which protects freedom of expression and opinion, subject to certain restrictions such as "respect of the rights or reputations of others" (art. 19, para. 3 (a)); and article 20, which states that any advocacy of national, racial or religious hatred that constitutes incitement to discrimination, hostility or violence shall be prohibited by law.

On February 7, 2006 UN Secretary-General Kofi Annan, the Secretary-General of the OIC Ekmeleddin İhsanoğlu, and the High Representative for Common Foreign and Security Policy of the EU Javier Solana issued a joint statement:

The anguish in the Muslim world at the publication of these offensive caricatures is shared by all individuals and communities who recognize the sensitivity of deeply held religious belief. In all societies there is a need to show sensitivity and responsibility in treating issues of special significance for the adherents of any particular faith, even by those who do not share the belief in question.

We fully uphold the right of free speech. But we understand the deep hurt and widespread indignation felt in the Muslim world. We believe freedom of the press entails responsibility and discretion, and should respect the beliefs and tenets of all religions.

But we also believe the recent violent acts surpass the limits of peaceful protest. In particular, we strongly condemn the deplorable attacks on diplomatic missions that have occurred in Damascus, Beirut and elsewhere. Aggression against life and property can only damage the image of a peaceful Islam. We call on the authorities of all countries to protect all diplomatic premises and foreign citizens against unlawful attack.

These events make the need for renewed dialogue, among and between communities of different faiths and authorities of different countries, all the more urgent. We call on them to appeal for restraint and calm, in the spirit of friendship and mutual respect.

== Criticism of Muslim reactions ==
Commentators who characterize the Muslim reaction as hypocritical claim to several inconsistencies. First, the numerous antisemitic publications in Arab media. One website, Filibuster Cartoons, pointed out this criticism in a political cartoon. Also countries like Syria, Saudi Arabia, and Libya where demonstrations are tightly controlled, have been accused of allowing violent riots as a distraction. In the case of Syria, protests would not be inconvenient in light of the current Hariri investigation.

Various commentators across the political spectrum view the Muslim reaction to the cartoons, be it the actual violence or the non-violent justification for the violence, as evidence of what Samuel Huntington predicted in his 1993 book, The Clash of Civilizations, namely, "the fundamental source of conflict in this new world will not be primarily ideological or primarily economic ... the dominating source of conflict will be cultural…"

Daniel Pipes argues that the pattern of events shows Muslim hypocrisy and supremacism:

... will Westerners accede to a double standard by which Muslims are free to insult Judaism, Christianity, Hinduism, and Buddhism, while Muhammad, Islam, and Muslims enjoy immunity from insults? Muslims routinely publish cartoons far more offensive than the Danish ones. ... The deeper issue here, however, is not Muslim hypocrisy but Islamic supremacism.

George Friedman, the founder of Stratfor, questions why Muslims would threaten all members of a given nationality as a result of the actions of a few of its members or that of a small, private company. Friedman notes that according to that logic, not only would the entire Western world be held "hostage" to the strictures of Islam, but the entire Western world (or at least all Scandinavians) would bear the consequences for the actions of individuals they cannot control. Therefore, Westerners would have to conclude that violent clashes between the West and jihadist elements is both inevitable and uncontrollable.

Mark Stein of the Jerusalem Post prefers to view the massively disproportionate Muslim response as simply a form of "arm flexing" or intimidation by violent Muslim factions.

Some commentators also assert that there is an inconsistent reaction towards various countries whose media is guilty of the same thing. For example, the Egyptian newspaper El Fagr published 6 of the Muhammad cartoons during Ramadan with no apparent adverse reaction.

In response to some of these criticisms, editor of Al-Quds Al-Arabi Abd al-Bari Atwan on the BBC's Dateline London argued that most if not all of the 'anti-semitic' cartoons in the Arab press are of Israeli politicians not of Jewish prophets (as Jewish prophets are also prophets of Islam), or related to the occupation of Palestine and the Sabra and Shatila massacres. On the other hand, "anti-semitic" cartoons can be considered offensive to many within the Jewish community.

== See also ==
- Jyllands-Posten Muhammad cartoons controversy
- Government-organized demonstration
