= 2004 in Danish television =

This is a list of Danish television related events from 2004.

== Events ==
- 1 May – Canal+ Sport is launched.
- 14 May – The marriage of Frederik, Crown Prince of Denmark and Mary Donaldson takes place at the Church of Our Lady.
- 16 November – Rikke Emma Niebuhr wins the second season of Idols.
- 27 November – Johnni Johansen wins season 3 of Big Brother.

== Debuts ==
=== Domestic ===
- 10 October – The Eagle (DR) (2004–2006)

=== International ===
- January – (United Kingdom) Tractor Tom (TV2)

== Television shows ==
=== 1990s ===
- Hvem vil være millionær? (1999–present)

=== 2000s ===
- Big Brother (2001–2005, 2012–2014)

== Ending this year ==
- Idols (2003–2004)

== Networks and services ==
=== Launches ===
| Network | Type | Launch date | Notes | Source |
|---|---|---|---|---|
| C More Film | Cable television | Unknown | | |
| Viasat Sport 2 | Cable television | 1 February | | |
| Viasat Sport 3 | Cable television | 1 February | | |
| Roj TV | Cable television | 1 March | | |
| Canal+ Film 1 | Cable television | 1 May | | |
| Canal+ Sport | Cable television | 1 May | | |
| Canal+ Film 2 | Cable television | 1 May | | |
| Showtime Scandinavia | Cable television | 30 September | | |
| TV 2 Charlie | Cable television | 1 October | | |
| Viasat History | Cable television | 1 November | | |

=== Conversions and rebrandings ===
| Old network name | New network name | Type | Conversion Date | Notes | Source |
|---|---|---|---|---|---|
| TV Danmark 1 | Kanal 5 | Cable television | 4 April | | |

== See also ==
- 2004 in Denmark
