= Idols (Danish TV series) season 2 =

Idols
- Season 2
- Hosted by: Tomas Villum Jensen; Uffe Holm
- Judges: Thomas Blachman; Susanne Kier; Anders Hansen
- Winner: Rikke Emma Niebuhr
- Runner-up: Louise Baltzer Jensen
- No. of episodes: 17

Release
- Original network: TV3
- Original release: August 31 – November 16, 2004

Season chronology
- ← Previous; Season 1

Idols 2004 was the second season of Idols Denmark. Rikke Emma Niebuhr won over Louise Baltzer Jensen. Idols in Denmark was subsequently put on an indefinite hiatus after this season, and has not aired since.

== Finals ==
=== Finalists ===
(ages stated at time of contest)

Contestant	Age	Hometown	Voted Off	Liveshow Theme
Rikke Emma Niebuhr	20	Aabyhøj	Winner	Grand Finale
Louise Baltzer Jensen	22	Frederiksværk	November 2, 2004; November 16, 2004	Rock Hits; Grand Finale
Simon Søndergaard	16	Uldum	November 9, 2004	Judge's Choice
Søren Fruergaard	23	Valby	November 9, 2004	Judge's Choice
Julia	22	Holbæk	October 26, 2004	Latin Hits
Theis Andersen	25	Amager	October 19, 2004	R&B Hits
Jacob Schink	21	Aarhus	October 12, 2004	Love Songs
Nadia Malm Hansen	17	Brøndby Strand	October 12, 2004	Love Songs

=== Live Show Details ===
==== Heat 1 - Top 9 Girls (24 September 2004) ====
Artist	Song (original artists)	Result
Anja	"" ()	Eliminated
Camilla	"" ()	Eliminated
Ida Ambrose	"" ()	Eliminated
Julia	"" ()	Advanced
Louise Baltzer Jensen	"In Your Eyes" (Kylie Minogue)	Advanced
Maria	"" ()	Eliminated
Nadia Malm Hansen	"" ()	Advanced
Rikke Emma Niebuhr	"There You'll Be" (Faith Hill)	Advanced
Zola	"" ()	Eliminated

==== Heat 2 - Top 9 Boys (5 October 2004) ====
Artist	Song (original artists)	Result
Brian	"" ()	Eliminated
Daniel	"" ()	Eliminated
Elias	"" ()	Eliminated
Jacob Schink	"" ()	Advanced
Magnus	"" ()	Eliminated
Simon Søndergaard	"" ()	Advanced
Søren Fruergaard	"" ()	Advanced
Theis Andersen	"" ()	Advanced
Wafande	"" ()	Eliminated

==== Live Show 1 (12 October 2004) ====
Theme: Love Songs

Artist	Song (original artists)	Result
Jacob Schink	"How Deep Is Your Love" (Bee Gees)	Eliminated
Julia	"Just the Two of Us" (Bill Withers)	Safe
Louise Baltzer Jensen	"Falling into You" (Celine Dion)	Safe
Nadia Malm Hansen	"You're Still the One" (Shania Twain)	Eliminated
Rikke Emma Niebuhr	"I Love You Baby" ()	Safe
Simon Søndergaard	"Feel" (Robbie Williams)	Bottom three
Søren Fruergaard	"Den allersidste dans" (Poul Reichhardt & Bodil Kjer)	Safe
Theis Andersen	"She's So High" (Tal Bachman)	Safe

==== Live Show 2 (19 October 2004) ====
Theme: R&B Hits

Artist	Song (original artists)	Result
Julia	"I Try" (Macy Gray)	Bottom two
Louise Baltzer Jensen	"Another Sad Love Song" (Toni Braxton)	Safe
Rikke Emma Niebuhr	"Hit 'Em Up Style (Oops!)" (Blu Cantrell)	Safe
Simon Søndergaard	"I Wanna Know" (Joe)	Safe
Søren Fruergaard	"Fastlove" (George Michael)	Safe
Theis Andersen	"Du havde en dårlig dag" ()	Eliminated

==== Live Show 3 (26 October 2004) ====
Theme: Latin Hits

Artist	Song (original artists)	Result
Julia	"Más Allá" (Gloria Estefan)	Eliminated
Louise Baltzer Jensen	"Whenever, Wherever" (Shakira)	Safe
Rikke Emma Niebuhr	"Ain't It Funny" (Jennifer Lopez)	Bottom two
Simon Søndergaard	"Livin' la Vida Loca" (Ricky Martin)	Safe
Søren Fruergaard	"Bailamos" (Enrique Iglesias)	Safe

==== Live Show 4 (2 November 2004) ====
Theme: Rock Hits

Artist	Song (original artists)	Result
Louise Baltzer Jensen	"Sk8er Boi" (Avril Lavigne)	Eliminated
Rikke Emma Niebuhr	"Heaven" (Bryan Adams)	Bottom two
Simon Søndergaard	"Silverflame" (Dizzy Mizz Lizzy)	Safe
Søren Fruergaard	"99 Luftballons" (Nena)	Safe

Notes

- Immediately after the broadcast, TV3 became aware that some viewers had major problems getting through their SMS votes. Since then, it has regrettably been shown that it has in fact been about many more viewers who could not get through to the vote due to a cable breach. Therefore, TV3 decided that Louise would get another chance in the competition.

==== Live Show 5: Semi-final (9 November 2004) ====
Theme: Judge's Choice

Artist	First song (original artists)	Second song	Result
Louise Baltzer Jensen	"Just One of Us" ()	"Little Lies" (Fleetwood Mac)	Safe
Rikke Emma Niebuhr	"Walking in Memphis" (Cher)	"What Becomes of the Brokenhearted" (Jimmy Ruffin)	Safe
Simon Søndergaard	"Losing My Religion" (R.E.M.)	"Love Hurts" (Nazareth)	Eliminated
Søren Fruergaard	"Oh! Daisy" ()	"Strangers in the Night" (Frank Sinatra)	Eliminated

==== Live final (16 November 2004) ====
Artist	First song	Second song	Third song	Result
Louise Baltzer Jensen	"Imaginary"	"In Your Eyes"	"Get There"	Runner-up
Rikke Emma Niebuhr	"Holding Out for a Hero"	"There You'll Be"	"Get There"	Winner
