= I See Right Through to You =

Single by DJ Encore featuring Engelina

from the album Intuition
- Released: March 2001
- Genre: Eurodance; dance-pop
- Length: 3:49
- Label: Universal
- Songwriters: Andreas Hemmeth, Engelina
- Producers: Michael Parsberg, Jakob Stavnstrup, Andreas Hemmeth

DJ Encore featuring Engelina singles chronology
| "I See Right Through to You" (2001) | "Walking in the Sky" (2002) |

"I See Right Through to You" is the debut single by Danish Eurodance producer DJ Encore featuring vocals by Danish singer Engelina. It was released as the lead single from DJ Encore's debut album, Intuition, in 2001.

The song served as the theme song to the first season of the reality television show Big Brother Denmark. It peaked at number one in Denmark and at number fifteen in the U.S. on Billboard's Hot Dance Club Songs chart.

== Track listing ==
Danish CD single
| No. | Title | Length |
|---|---|---|
| 1. | "I See Right Through to You" (Radio Edit) | 3:49 |
| 2. | "I See Right Through to You" (Extended Version) | 5:24 |
| 3. | "I See Right Through to You" (Access Remix) | 5:03 |
| 4. | "I See Right Through to You" (Fridge Mix) | 9:20 |
| 5. | "I See Right Through to You" (DoubleN Mix) | 6:15 |
| 6. | "I See Right Through to You" (Tandu Mix) | 8:07 |
| 7. | "I See Right Through to You" (Junkfood Junkies Mix) | 7:05 |

US CD single
| No. | Title | Length |
|---|---|---|
| 1. | "I See Right Through to You" (Original Radio Edit) | 3:47 |
| 2. | "I See Right Through to You" (Al B Rich Breaks Radio Edit) | 3:47 |
| 3. | "I See Right Through to You" (Al B Rich Breaks Mix) | 5:37 |
| 4. | "I See Right Through to You" (Andy & The Lamboy Circuit Mixshow) | 6:34 |
| 5. | "I See Right Through to You" (DJ Giuseppe D Hothead US Remix) | 6:57 |
| 6. | "I See Right Through to You" (Access Remix) | 5:01 |

UK CD single
| No. | Title | Length |
|---|---|---|
| 1. | "I See Right Through to You" (Radio Edit) | 3:51 |
| 2. | "I See Right Through to You" (Pulser Remix) | 7:40 |
| 3. | "I See Right Through to You" (Fridge Mix) | 8:14 |
| 4. | "I See Right Through to You" (Music Video) | 3:23 |

== Personnel ==
- Writing – Andreas Hemmeth, Engelina
- Producer – Michael Parsberg, Jakob Stavnstrup, Andreas Hemmeth
- Mixing – Michael Parsberg, Jakob Stavnstrup, Andreas Hemmeth
- Vocals – Engelina
- Mastering – Jan Eliasson

== Charts ==
| Chart (2001–2002) | Peak position |
|---|---|
| Denmark (Tracklisten) | 1 |
| Germany (GfK) | 66 |
| US Dance Club Songs (Billboard) | 15 |
