= 2001 in Danish television =

This is a list of Danish television related events from 2001.

== Events ==
- 28 January – The Danish version of Big Brother debuts on TV Danmark.
- 10 May – The first season of Big Brother is won by Jill Liv Nielsen.
- 12 May – The 46th Eurovision Song Contest is held at the Parken Stadium in Copenhagen. Estonia wins the contest with the song "Everybody", performed by Tanel Padar & Dave Benton.
- October – Søren Brøndum Laursen becomes the first person to win 1,000,000 kr in Hvem vil være millionær?.

== Debuts ==
- Big Brother (2001–2005, 2012–2014)

=== International ===
- (United States) CSI: Crime Scene Investigation
- (United States) Law & Order: Special Victims Unit

== Television shows ==
=== 1990s ===
- The Fairytaler (1998–2003)
- Robinson Ekspeditionen (1998–present)
- Hvem vil være millionær? (1999–present)

== See also ==
- 2001 in Denmark
