= 2002 in Danish television =

This is a list of Danish television related events from 2002.

== Events ==
- January – The channel Viasat Explore launches.
- 6 December – Carsten B. Berthelsen wins the second season of Big Brother.

== Television shows ==
=== 1990s ===
- The Fairytaler (1998-2003)
- Robinson Ekspeditionen (1998–present)
- Hvem vil være millionær? (1999–present)

=== 2000s ===
- Big Brother (2001-2005, 2012–2014)

== See also ==
- 2002 in Denmark
