= Alien Beat Club =

Danish musical group

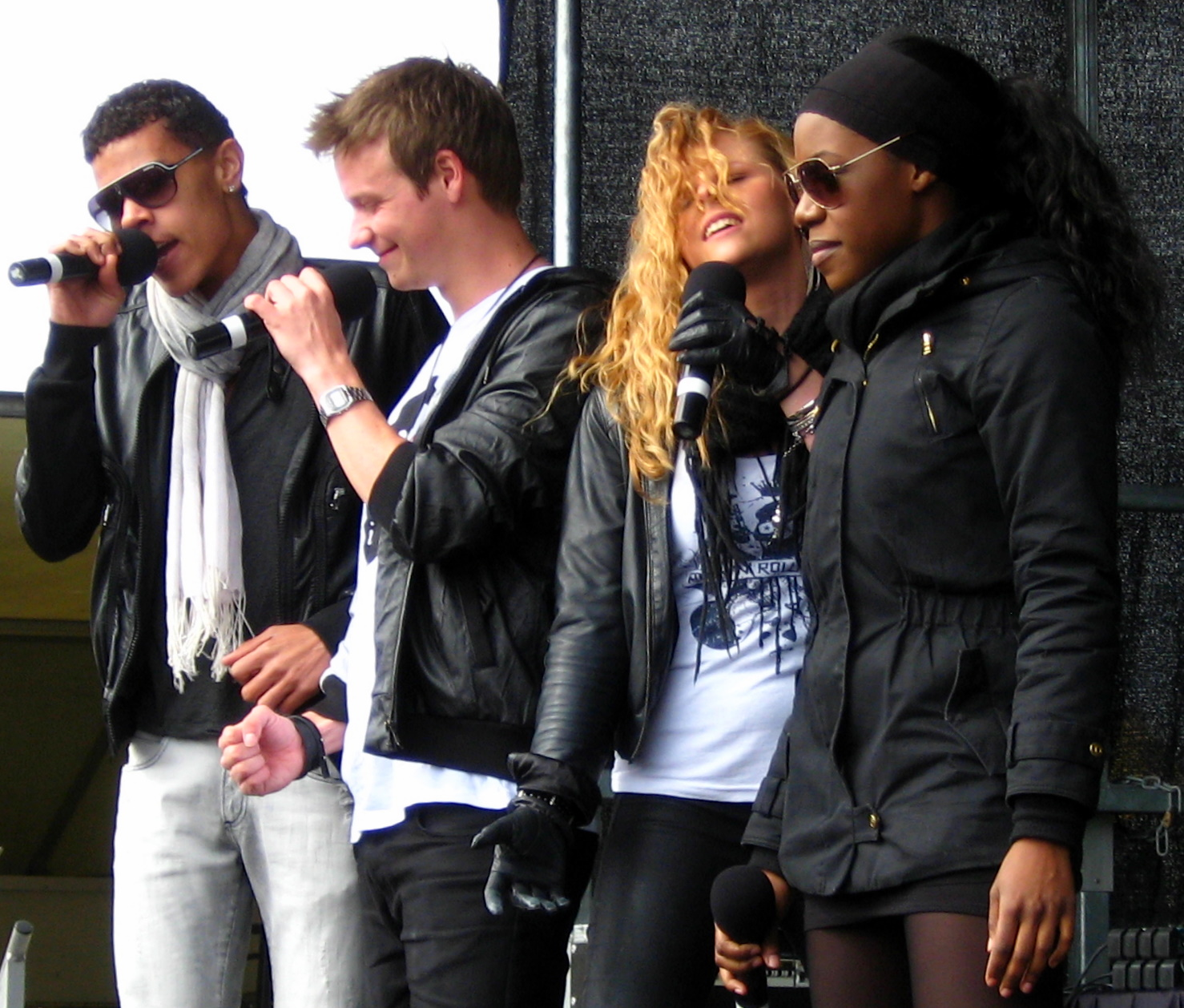
- In Hirtshals, 2010

Background information
- Also known as: ABC
- Origin: Denmark
- Years active: 2009 - 2012
- Members: Kasper Spring Ehlers; Patricia Namakula Mbabazi; Marcel Mark Gbekle; Stephanie Lykkehøj Gudmundsen
- Website: http://alienbeatclub.dk/

Alien Beat Club (often abbreviated as ABC) were a Danish pop/R&B group, best known as second-place winners on Series 2 of The X Factor. Its members - Kasper Spring Ehlers, Marcel Mark Gbekle, Patricia Namakula Mbabazi and Stephanie Lykkehøj Gudmundsen - had originally auditioned as solo artists at the beginning of the competition, but were later formed into a band by judge/mentor Remee.

== X Factor ==
Date	Theme	Performer	Song	Result
13.02.2009	Hits	Duffy	"Warwick Avenue"	Safe to next round
20.02.2009	Made in Denmark	Dieters Lieder / Rune	"Dig og mig" / "Calabria"	Safe to next round
27.02.2009	Motown songs	Jackson 5	"I'll Be There"	Safe to next round
06.03.2009	ABBA songs	ABBA	"Voulez-Vous"	Safe to next round
13.03.2009	Danish Big Band	Britney Spears	"Toxic"	Safe to next round
20.03.2009	Sanne Salomonsen songs	Sanne Salomonsen	"Taxa"	Safe to next round
20.03.2009	Dedication	Jason Mraz	"I'm Yours"	Safe to next round
27.03.2009	Free choice	Elton John / Lady Gaga	"Circle of Life" / "Just Dance"	To second round of finals
27.03.2009	X Factor winning song		"Det bedste til sidst"	X Factor runner-up

Prior to joining Alien Beat Club, Kasper had been a finalist in Idols, Patricia was a customer service representative for Telia, Stephanie was a singer/songwriter in another band, and Marcel was a football player.

== After X Factor ==
Alien Beat Club released the single "My Way", in weeks 38/2009, which went to number one on Tracklisten, the official Danish Singles Chart. They have also released a charity single "It's My World", in support of UNICEF.

== Discography ==
=== Albums ===
Year	Album	Peak positions	Certification
Year	Album	DEN	Certification
2009	Diversity	12	

=== Singles ===
Year	Single	Peak positions	Album
Year	Single	DEN	Album
2009	"Dig og mig"	11	
2009	"My Way"	1	Diversity
2010	"Simple Things"	–	Diversity
2010	"It's My World"	–	Diversity
