= Intuition (DJ Encore album) =

Studio album by DJ Encore featuring Engelina
- Released: 8 October 2001
- Genres: dance-pop, Eurodance, pop
- Length: 51:28
- Label: Universal
- Producers: Andreas Hemmeth, Matt Schwartz, Ingo Kunzi, Michael Parsberg, Jensen & Larrson, Jakob Stavnstrup, Kevin Malpass, Serge Ramaekers, Darren Tate

DJ Encore chronology
Intuition (2001)	Unique (2007)

Singles from Intuition
- 1. "I See Right Through to You" Released: March 2001; 2. "Walking in the Sky" Released: 2002; 3. "High on Life" Released: 2002; 4. "You've Got a Way" Released: 2002

Intuition is the debut album by the Danish Eurodance producer DJ Encore featuring the vocals of singer Engelina. It was released in Denmark on 8 October 2001 and in the United States on 29 January 2002.

== Track listing ==
No.	Title	Writer(s)	Producer(s)	Length
1.	"Intro"	Andreas Hemmeth	Andreas Hemmeth	1:48
2.	"Open Your Eyes"	Hemmeth, Engelina, Jonathan Charles Skinner, Martin Thygesen	Hemmeth	4:46
3.	"I See Right Through to You"	Hemmeth, Engelina, Michael Parsberg, Jakob Stavnstrup	Parsberg, Stavnstrup, Hemmeth	3:49
4.	"High on Life"	Hemmeth, Engelina, Matt Schwartz	Ingo Kunzi, Hemmeth	3:51
5.	"Talk to Me"	Hemmeth, Engelina, Schwartz	Schwartz	4:19
6.	"Intuition"	Hemmeth, Engelina, Kevin Malpass	Hemmeth	4:03
7.	"You've Got a Way"	Hemmeth, Engelina, Malpass	Malpass	4:26
8.	"Walking in the Sky"	Hemmeth, Engelina, Schwartz	Schwartz	3:32
9.	"Chemistry"	Hemmeth, Engelina, Serge Ramaekers	Ramaekers, Hemmeth	4:22
10.	"Out There"	Hemmeth, Engelina, Adam Powers	Lars Jensen & Martin Larsson	4:28
11.	"Show Me"	Engelina, Schwartz	Schwartz	3:16
12.	"Stay"	Hemmeth, Engelina, Schwartz, Katherine Ellis, Martin Thygesen	Kunzi, Hemmeth	3:22
13.	"Another Day"	Hemmeth, Engelina, Darren Tate, Thygesen	Tate	5:13

Bonus tracks edition
No.	Title	Writer(s)	Producer(s)	Length
14.	"You've Got a Way" (DJ Encore Pop Mix)	Hemmeth, Engelina, Malpass	Kunzi, Hemmeth	3:44
15.	"High on Life" (UK Single Mix)	Hemmeth, Engelina, Schwartz	Schwartz	3:44
16.	"Walking in the Sky" (DJ Encore Pop Mix)	Hemmeth, Engelina, Schwartz	Hemmeth, Parsberg	3:18
17.	"Contradictions" (You've Got a Way)	Hemmeth, Engelina, Malpass	Jensen & Larrson	4:14

== Charts ==
Chart (2001–2002)	Peak position
Danish Albums Chart	7
U.S. Dance/Electronic Albums	11

== Release history ==
Region	Date	Label	Format
Denmark	8 October 2001	Universal	CD
Canada	15 October 2001	Universal	CD
United States	29 January 2002	MCA	CD, digital download
