= Dagen (Danish newspaper) =

Danish newspaper

- Type: Daily newspaper
- Format: Compact
- Owner: Atlas Publishing A/S
- Publisher: Atlas Publishing A/S
- Editor: Kresten Schultz Jørgensen
- Founded: 22 October 2002
- Ceased publication: 6 December 2002
- Political alignment: None
- Language: Danish
- Headquarters: Copenhagen, Denmark

DAGEN (commonly written Dagen) was a Danish newspaper which published for only 41 issues, from 22 October 2002 to 6 December 2002. DAGEN was the first new newspaper in almost 50 years in Denmark.

== History and profile ==
On 6 December 2002, Dagen had a debt of 34.9 million DKK, and bankruptcy was declared on 13 December 2002.

Peter Linck was the creator of the newspaper, and the editor was Kresten Schultz Jørgensen.

The newspaper had more media coverage than it itself was able to cover about its bankruptcy. The coverage from other media was intense. Many used the newspaper's own mottos for jokes about its bankruptcy, a famous one was "til folk som kan læse, fra folk som ikke kan regne" (Danish: "for people who can read, from people who can't count") as a reference to the overwhelming bankruptcy it suffered.

== Mottos ==
DAGEN had a few mottos, in order to draw distance from other current newspapers.

- Til folk som kan læse, fra folk der kan skrive (Danish: to people who can read, from people who can write).
- Hverken venstreorienteret eller højreorienteret, men velorienteret (Danish: not left-wing nor right-wing, but well present)

== See also ==
- List of newspapers in Denmark
