= 1999 in Danish television =

This is a list of Danish television related events from 1999.

== Television shows ==
- The Fairytaler (1998-2003)
- Taxa (1997-1998)
- Robinson Ekspeditionen (1998–present)

== Channels ==
Closures:

- 14 February: Sky Entertainment

== See also ==
- 1999 in Denmark
