= The Riber Award =

Danish short film festival

The Riber Award or The Riber Prize (Danish: Riberprisen) is a Danish short film festival for the students at respectively Humanistic informatics, Informatics and Media Studies at Aalborg University. The short film festival is named after Associate Professor Jørgen Riber Christensen, who teaches at Aalborg University. The Riber Award is made each year as a professional volunteer event with a jury of recognized professionals to judge the films that participate in the competition during the short film festival.

== Background ==
The Riber Award had its official beginning in 2002 but dates back to the time when film production became a part of the education program at Humanistic Informatics. The idea for a short film festival came from the tutor corps at Humanistic Informatics, who wanted to pay tribute to the unconventional and creative examination form. This tribute began at a very low practical level for example in connection with the annual Christmas party. But all this changed in 2002 when a group of students at Humanistic Informatics devised the idea of upgraded this tribute to a short film festival. The first couple of years the short film festival took place at the concert hall at the student house in Aalborg. The Riber Award quickly created so much media attention that Aalborg University began supporting the project in the hope that it could continue for many years to come. As the short film festival grow bigger and bigger it also became necessary to find larger and larger locations where it was possible to hold the event.

== The awards ==
- The Award for Best Effect - This award is given to the short film that has the best digital effects made in the post production.
- The Award for Best Detail - This award is given to the short film that has the best non-digitally created effect that are made during production.
- The Award for Best Audio Side - This award is given to the short film that has the best audio side either real sounds, sound effects and original music.
- The Award for Best Visual Expressions (cinematography) - This award is given to the short films that has the best visual expression such as color, light, camera angles and other visual effects.
- The Award for Best Storytelling - This award is given to the short film that has the best storytelling.
- The Award for Best Editing - This award is given to the short film that has the best editing and cutting rhythm.
- The Award for Best Idea - This award is given to the short film that has the best idea or best story.
- This Year's Popcorn - This award is given to the short films that has excelled in a special way without perhaps having been nominated or having won an award in other categories.
- The Award for Best Actress - This award is given to the best female actress among the submitted films.
- The Award for Best Actor - This award is given to the best male actor among the submitted films.
- The Audience Award - This award is given to the short films that audiences think is the best among the submitted films.
- The Award for Best Film/The Riber Award - The Riber Award is the short film festivals grand prize given to the short films that have excelled overall in all areas.

== Locations ==
- 2002 - Student Concert Hall
- 2003 - Student Concert Hall
- 2004 - Student Concert Hall
- 2005 - Grand
- 2006 - The European Hall
- 2007 - Grand
- 2008 - The Symphony
- 2009 - Aalborg College of Education
- 2010 - Skråen in Nord Kraft
- 2011 - Skråen in Nord Kraft
- 2012 - Skråen in Nord Kraft
- 2013 - Multi Hall in Nordkraft
- 2014 - Multi Hall in Nordkraft
