= Thomas Bickham =

Danish designer

Thomas Bickham, also known as Tomboy (born in Værløse), is a Danish drag queen, stylist, hairdresser, designer and television personality.

== Career ==
Bickham trained as a clothing operator. As a 19 year old he started working as a drag queen. He has participated in the Danish television shows Big Brother VIP (Denmark) 2003 (which he won), The Lyrics Board and De Fantastiske 5 (Danish version of Queer Eye), as well as several television advertisements.

He released the album Ok 2 B Gay in 2006, using the alias Tomboy.

== Awards ==
LGBT Denmark awarded him "homo of the year" for his 2003 participation in Big Brother VIP.
