= 1998 in Danish television =

This is a list of Danish television related events from 1998.

== Events ==
- Denmark, along with Austria, Bosnia and Herzegovina, Iceland, Italy, and Russia, withdrew from the Eurovision Song Contest 1998 due to the relegation rule, which considered the average scores from the past five years.

== Debuts ==
- 1 Sep - Robinson Ekspeditionen (1998–present)

== Television shows ==
- Strisser på Samsø (1997-1998)
- The Fairytaler (1998-2003)
- Taxa (1997-1998)

== Channels ==
Launches:

- 1 October: Discovery Travel & Living

Conversions and rebrandings:

- 2 February: TV6 to Viasat Nature/Crime
