= DJ Encore =

Danish songwriter, musician and journalist

- Also known as: DJ Encore
- Born: Andreas Bang Hemmeth; 3 April 1979 (age 47); Copenhagen, Denmark
- Genre: Trance
- Occupations: Songwriter, producer
- Instruments: Keyboards, guitar, bass
- Labels: Koch, Universal

Andreas Bang Hemmeth (born 3 April 1979), better known as DJ Encore, is a Danish songwriter, music artist and journalist. He is currently head of press for the Danish Social Liberal Party (Radikale Venstre).

His best result was a first place on the American Billboard charts with a remix of a single for the American artist Res. Hemmeth was also in the top of the charts in Britain with two remixes for artists LeAnn Rimes and Frou Frou.

As the artist DJ Encore, Hemmeth was rewarded with double platinum for the single "I see right through to you" in his home country Denmark, where the song also was used as a soundtrack for the reality show Big Brother. The song was the precursor to his debut album "Intuition" with vocalist Engelina. It was released in 2001 in Denmark and in the rest of the world the following year. The album also contained the hits "Walking in the Sky" and "High on Life". DJ Encore and Engelina went on a tour that included more than 100 concerts in Denmark including one of Northern Europes biggest festivals Grøn Koncert. They also played many concerts in the US, Canada, England and Germany.

Hemmeth has a total of 13 platinum records, three gold records and two awards for his music career.

== Discography ==
=== Albums ===
- Intuition (2001)
- Ultra.Dance 02 (DJ compilation) (2002)
- Unique (2007)

=== Singles ===
as DJ Encore

- "I See Right Through to You" (2001)
- "Walking in the Sky" (2002)
- "High on Life" (2002)
- "You've Got a Way" (2002)
- "You Can Walk on Water" (2007)
- "Out There" (2007)
- "Falling" (2008)

=== Remixes ===
- "Shook Shook Shook" by Awe Manneh (1999)
- "Queen of the night" by Superstar (1999)
- "Soulsearcher" by North (2000)
- "AB-sangen" by Michael Falch (2000)
- "Moonchild" by DoubleN (2000)
- "Mr. DJ" S.O.A.P. - (DJ Encore Club Mix) (2000)
- "Take my breath away" by Berlin (2002)
- "Anyway" by Amber (2002)
- "Suddenly" by LeeAnn Rimes (2002)
- "Breathe in" by Frou Frou (2002)
- "They Say Vision" by RES (2002)
- "Fire in your eyes" by Two Face (2002)
- "Those left behind" by Zenith (2002)
- "Dust.wav" by Perpetouos Dreamer (2003)
- "This side up" by Jon (Danish Popstar winner) (2003)
- "Because the night" by Jan Wayne (2003)
- "Behind blue eyes" by Limp Bizkit (2004)
- "Stay" by Mynt (2005)
- "Humanimosity" by Zenith (2006)
- "Vampire Boy" by Sunny (van der remix) (2010)
