= Rikke Emma Niebuhr =

Danish singer

Rikke Emma Niebuhr (born in Aarhus, Denmark) is a singer who rose to popularity as the winner of Idols Denmark 2, the Danish version of Pop Idol. Rikke won with 65% of the total vote against Louise Baltzer Jensen.

In late 2005, it was revealed that Rikke was not given the 500,000DK contract with BMG Denmark as promised with the Idols title, no official reason was ever given.

== Idols Denmark 2 performances ==
- Top 18: "There You'll Be" by Faith Hill
- Top 8: "I Love You Baby"
- Top 6: "Hit 'Em Up Style (Oops!)" by Blu Cantrell
- Top 5: "Ain't It Funny" by Jennifer Lopez
- Top 4: "Heaven" by Bryan Adams
- Top 4: "What Becomes of the Broken Hearted?" by Jimmy Ruffin
- Top 4: "Walking in Memphis" by Marc Cohn
- Grand Final: "Get There"
- Grand Final: "Holding Out for a Hero" by Bonnie Tyler
- Grand Final: "There You'll Be" by Faith Hill

== Discography ==
- "Get There" – #2 Denmark
