= 2008 in Danish television =

This is a list of Danish television related events from 2008.

== Events ==
- 4 January - Launch of the Danish version of The X Factor.
- 28 March - 15-year-old Martin Hoberg Hedegaard wins the first season of X Factor.
- 24 October - Male dance duo Robotdrengene win the first season of Talent.
- 31 October - Olympic gold medal shot putter Joachim Olsen and his partner Marianne Eihilt win the fifth season of Vild med dans.

== Debuts ==
- 4 January - X Factor (2008–present)
- 15 August - Talent (2008-2010)

== Television shows ==
=== 1990s ===
- Hvem vil være millionær? (1999–present)

=== 2000s ===
- Klovn (2005-2009)
- Vild med dans (2005–present)

== Births ==
- 28 July - Cecilia Loffredo

== Channels ==
Launches:

- 1 January: Kanal 5 HD
- 2 January: TV 2 Sport HD
- 15 March: VH1
- 23 March: TV3 Puls
- 3 December: BBC HD

== See also ==
- 2008 in Denmark
