= 2009 in Danish television =

This is a list of Danish television related events from 2009.

== Events ==
- 27 March - Linda Andrews wins the second season of X Factor.
- 23 October - 23-year-old rapper Kalle Pimp wins the second season of Talent.
- 20 November - Racing driver Casper Elgaard and his partner Vickie Jo Ringgaard win the sixth season of Vild med dans.
- Channel launches - TV Danmark, Canal 9, DR HD, DR Ramasjang, Investigation Discovery, SF-kanalen, TV1000 Drama, Voom HD International, Disney XD, DR HD, DR K
- Channel closures - Viasat Sport 2, Viasat Sport 3

== Television shows ==
=== 1990s ===
- Hvem vil være millionær? (1999–present)

=== 2000s ===
- Vild med dans (2005–present)
- Talent (2008-2011)
- X Factor (2008–present)

== Ending this year ==
- Klovn (2005-2009)

== See also ==
- 2009 in Denmark
