= 1996 in Danish television =

This is a list of Danish television related events from 1996.

== Events ==
- 19 October - Claus Nielsen, performing as John Lennon wins the second and final season of Stjerneskud.

== Debuts ==
=== International ===
- 19 August - (Australia) Bananas in Pyjamas
- August - (United Kingdom) Thomas the Tank Engine and Friends

== Ending this year ==
- Stjerneskud (1995-1996)

== Channels ==
Launches:

- 23 March: Sportkanalen
- DR2

Closures:

- 29 April: TV3+
- 30 December: Sportkanalen

== See also ==
- 1996 in Denmark
