= Bashy Quraishy =

Danish-Pakistani author

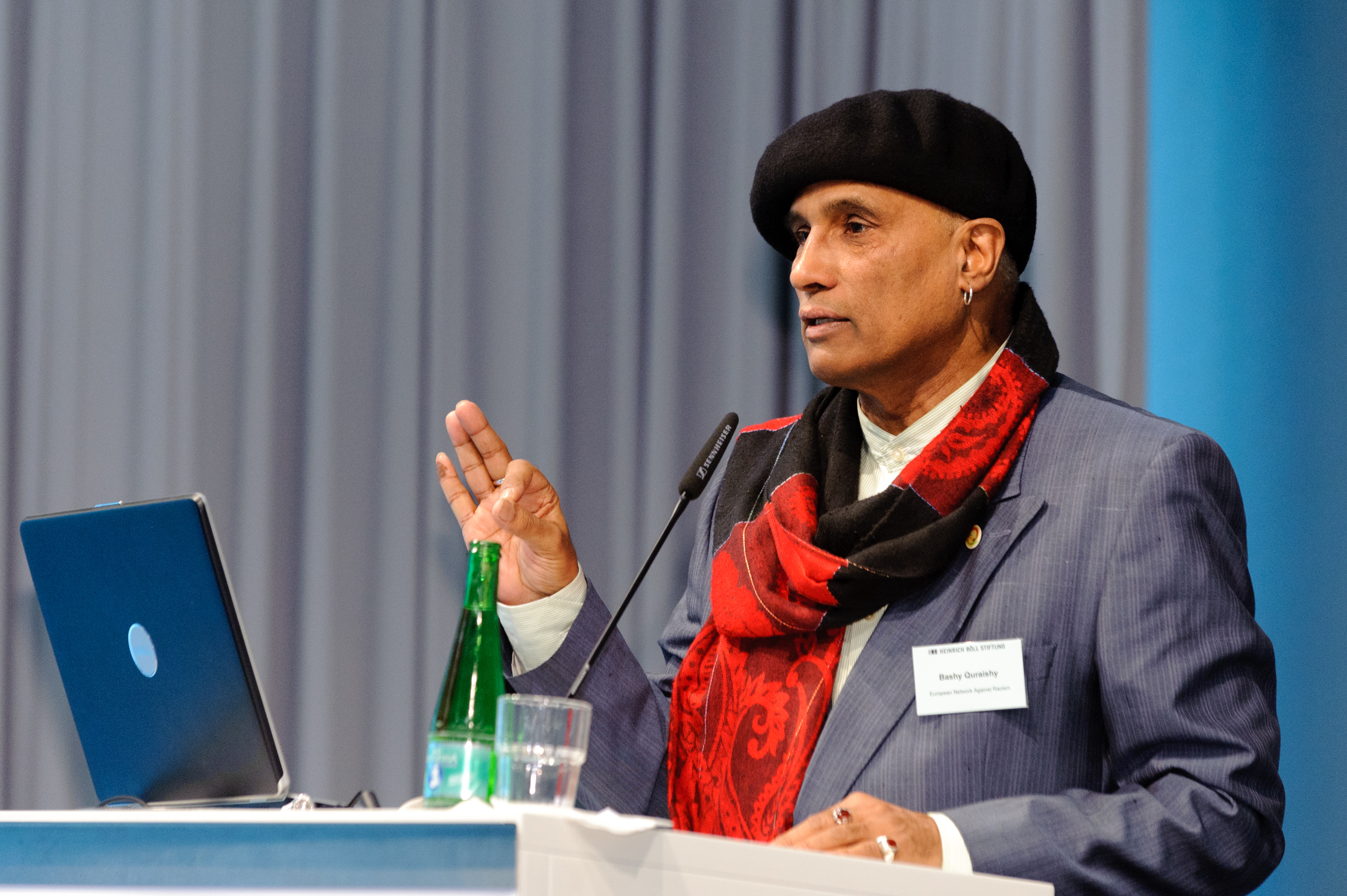
Bashy Quraishy (2011)

Bashy Quraishy is a Danish-Pakistani author and consultant regarding minority rights.

== Allegations of Corruption and Fraud at POEM ==
Quraishy served as the Chairman of Denmark's largest immigrant organisation POEM, Paraplyorganisationen for de Etniske Mindretal, until 2003. Between 13 and 17 October 2003, the Danish daily newspaper Ekstra Bladet ran a series of investigative articles revealing numerous irregularities related to accounting practices and inflated membership figures within POEM. Following the revelations, all public funding for the organization in Denmark was withdrawn. The newspaper also suggested that Bashy Quraishy was likely aware of, and possibly involved in, what appeared to be extensive fraudulent activity.

Quraishy resigned as the chairman of POEM on 29 October 2003 soon after this controversy came to light.

== Sources ==
- Helm, Toby (6 April 2002). "Denmark leads the 'racist reaction'". The Daily Telegraph.
- Osborn, Andrew (29 June 2002). "Danes justify harshest asylum laws in Europe". The Guardian.
