= Christian Mendoza =

- Born: 1987 (age 37–38); Philippines
- Origin: Copenhagen, Denmark
- Genres: Pop
- Occupation: Singer

Christian Mendoza (born 1992 in the Philippines, now living in Copenhagen, Denmark) is a singer who rose to popularity as the winner of Idols Denmark, the Danish version of Pop Idol. Christian won with 57% of the total vote against Mirza Radonjica.

== Idols Denmark Performances ==
Top 30:
Top 10: "When a Man Loves a Woman" by Percy Sledge
Top 9: She's A Bad Mama Jama by Carl Carlton
Top 8: Take On Me by A-Ha
Top 7: Smuk Som Et Stjerneskud by the Olsen Brothers
Top 6: You Are The Sunshine Of My Life by Stevie Wonder
Top 5: For Once In My Life by Frank Sinatra
Top 4: White Christmas by Bing Crosby
Top 4: Yesterday by The Beatles
Top 3: The Greatest Love Of All by Whitney Houston
Top 3: Rise & Fall by Sting & Craig David
Grand Final: Mystery To Me
Grand Final: She's A Bad Mama Jama by Carl Carlton
Grand Final: Babygirl by B2K

== Discography ==
=== Album ===
- Can't Break Me... (2004)

=== Singles ===
- Mystery To Me (2003)
- It's All About You (2004)
