= 1995 in Danish television =

This is a list of Danish television related events from 1995.

== Events ==
- Unknown - Debut of Stjerneskud, a series hosted by Anders Frandsen in which members of the public impersonate their favourite singers.
- Unknown - The first season of Stjerneskud was won by Gry Trampedach performing as Sanne Salomonsen.

== Debuts ==
- Unknown - Stjerneskud (1995-1996)

== Channels ==
Launches:

- February: TV1000 Cinema
- 27 March: TV3+

== See also ==
- 1995 in Denmark
