= 2007 in Danish television =

This is a list of Danish television related events from 2007.

== Events ==
- 16 November - Kærlighed ved første hik actor Robert Hansen and his partner Marianne Eihilt win the fourth season of Vild med dans.

== Television shows ==
=== 1990s ===
- Hvem vil være millionær? (1999–present)

=== 2000s ===
- Klovn (2005-2009)
- Vild med dans (2005–present)

== Channels ==
Launches:

- January: Viasat Golf
- 3 February: C More Sport HD
- 7 June: DR Update

Conversions and rebrandings:

- Unknown: Canal+ Film 1 to Canal+ First
- 1 November: Canal+ Film 2 to Canal+ Hits

Closures:

- January: Viasat Sport 24

== See also ==
- 2007 in Denmark
