= Idols (Danish TV series) =

- Idols Danmark logo (2003–2004)
- Idols Danmark
- Genre: Talent Show
- Created by: Simon Fuller
- Based on: Pop Idol
- Developed by: Blu Productions
- Presented by: Tomas Villum Jensen; Uffe Holm
- Judges: Thomas Blachman; Kjeld Wennick; Henriette Blix; Carsten Kroeyer; Susanne Kier; Anders Hansen
- Opening theme: Idols Theme Song
- Country of origin: Denmark
- Original language: Danish
- No. of seasons: 2
- No. of episodes: 36

Production
- Producer: Henrik Zachariassen
- Running time: 60–90 minutes

Original release
- Network: TV3 (2003–2004)
- Release: 1 September 2003 – 16 November 2004

Related
- X Factor Denmark; Talent Denmark; Voice - The Biggest Voice of Denmark

Idols Danmark , also known as Idols: Ærlig Jagt. Ægte Talent, is the Danish version of the British music competition Pop Idol, created by Simon Fuller. After Pop Idol became a great success in England in 2001, the Danish pay-channel TV3 announced in 2003, that they would launch a Danish version of Idols. Idols premiered on Danish television in September 2003 with Tomas Villum Jensen and Uffe Holm presenting the show. The premiere of Idols 2003 was watched by over 450,000 people and 188,000 people in average watched the first season. The judges in the first season were Thomas Blachman, Kjeld Wennick, Henriette Blix and Carsten Kroeyer. Idols returned once again in 2004, but the second season was not as successful as its predecessor, Idols 2004 is known as the shortest Idols season in the world, with production lasting no more than 3 months. It is also seen as one of the most unsuccessful seasons of all time, Thomas Blachman returned as the only remaining judge from the first season, along with the new judges Susanne Kier and Anders Hansen. Idols in Denmark was subsequently put on an indefinite hiatus after the second season.

Although Idols in Denmark was never officially canceled, TV3 has not made any further announcement regarding the series since 2004. The series is now generally considered to have been canceled.

However, in 2019, the creator of the Idols franchise Simon Fuller told that he's more than willing to give Idols in Denmark another shot if he received offers to bring it back on other networks, and when there is less competition on the television talent show landscape.

== Hosts and Judges ==
Hosts	Tomas Villum Jensen: 2003–2004; Uffe Holm: 2003–2004
Judges	Thomas Blachman: 2003–2004; Kjeld Wennick: 2003; Henriette Blix: 2003; Carsten Kroeyer: 2003; Susanne Kier: 2004; Anders Hansen: 2004
Guest judges	Kjeld Wennick: 2004; Saseline Sørensen: 2004

== Winners of Idols in Denmark ==
- Idols 2003: Christian Mendoza
- Idols 2004: Rikke Emma Niebuhr

== Idols 2003 ==
In mid-2003, auditions were held in Aarhus & Copenhagen. The best 30 contestants were chosen to perform in 3 groups of 10 in front of the Danish TV audience, the 3 contestants with the most votes per group advanced & one wildcard being chosen to the Top 10.

Filipino born Christian Mendoza won the first season over Mirza Radonjica with a 57% gain of the total vote.

In 2009, finalist Kasper Ehlers participated in the second series of The X Factor, where he was part of the second-placed group Alien Beat Club.

=== Finals elimination chart ===
Date	Theme	Bottom Three
October 22	Film Songs	Claus Kruuse	Kaspar Ehlers	Dorthe K. Hansen
October 29	Disco / 70s	Emil Uhldahl	Kaspar Ehlers (2)	Dorthe K. Hansen (2)
November 5	80s	Michael Friis Holm	Kaspar Ehlers (3)	Dorthe K. Hansen (3)
Date	Theme	Bottom Two
November 12	Danish Songs	Michael Christensen	Christian Mendoza
November 19	Motown	Lærke Blendstrup	Kaspar Ehlers (4)
November 26	Big Band	Thomas Kunak Andersen	Dorthe K. Hansen (4)
December 3	Christmas / Beatles	Dorthe K. Hansen (5)
December 10	Love Songs	Kaspar Ehlers (5)
December 17	Grand Finale	Mirza Radonjica	Christian Mendoza

== Idols 2004 ==
Idols 2004 in Denmark has the record for shortest Idol program in production with production lasting no more than 3 months.

Rikke Emma Niebuhr from Aarhus won with 65% of the total vote over Louise Baltzer Jensen from Frederiksværk.

Season two of Idols Denmark is often cited as the most unsuccessful of all Idol seasons with confirmed sources listing that not even 1,000 people had bothered to turn up to the auditions again in Aarhus & Copenhagen.

The winner was Rikke Emma Niebuhr over the runner-up Louise Baltzer Jensen. Rikke was denied her promised contract with BMG Denmark, though her debut single Get There sold moderately well.

=== Finals elimination chart ===
Date	Theme	Bottom Three
October 12	My Idol	Nadia Malm Hansen	Jacob Schink	Simon Søndergaard
Date	Theme	Bottom Two
October 19	R'n'B Hits	Theis Andersen	Julia
October 26	Latin Songs	Julia (2)	Rikke Emma Niebuhr
November 2	Rock Songs	Louise Baltzer Jensen	Rikke Emma Niebuhr (2)
November 9	Judges choice	Simon Søndergaard (2)	Søren Fruergaard
November 16	Grand Finale	Louise Baltzer Jensen(2)	Rikke Emma Niebuhr (3)
