= 2010 in Danish television =

This is a list of Danish television related events from 2010.

== Events ==
- 27 March – Thomas Ring wins the third season of X Factor.
- 22 October – Copenhagen Drummers win the third and final season of Talent.
- 19 November – TV2 weathergirl Cecile Hother and her partner Mads Vad win the seventh season of Vild med dans.

== Television shows ==
=== 1990s ===
- Hvem vil være millionær? (1999–present)

=== 2000s ===
- Vild med dans (2005–present)
- X Factor (2008–present)

== Ending this year ==
- Talent (2008-2010)

== Channels ==
Launches:

- 2 February: TV3+ HD
- 1 April: Canal+ Series
- 27 August: Canal+ Hockey
- 1 September: Nick Jr.
- 30 September: Boomerang
- 27 December: Viasat 3D

== See also ==
- 2010 in Denmark
