= 1997 in Danish television =

This is a list of Danish television related events from 1997.

== Events ==
- 1 March - Kølig Kaj is selected to represent Denmark at the 1997 Eurovision Song Contest with his song "Stemmen i mit liv". He is selected to be the twenty-seventh Danish Eurovision entry during Dansk Melodi Grand Prix held at the DR Studios in Copenhagen.
- Animal Planet Nordic launches.
- September - History launches.

== Debuts ==
=== Domestic ===
- Taxa (DR1) (1997–1999)
- Strisser på Samsø (TV2) (1997–1998)

=== International ===
- (United Kingdom) Teletubbies (TV2)

== Channels ==
Launches:

- 1 February: Nickelodeon
- September: National Geographic
- 15 September: Sky Entertainment

Closures:

- Unknown: K-T.V.

== See also ==
- 1997 in Denmark
