= Big Brother (Danish TV series) =

- Official Big Brother Danmark logo from seasons 10 and 12
- Also known as: Big Brother Danmark
- Genre: Reality game show
- Created by: John de Mol Jr.
- Based on: Nineteen Eighty-Four by George Orwell
- Presented by: Lisbeth Janniche; Mads Vangsø; Anette Toftgaard; Jill Liv Nielsen; Adam Duvå Hall; Lisbeth Østergaard; Mattias Hundebøll; Marie Egede; Peter Mygind; Anne Kejser; Oliver Bjerrehuus
- Narrated by: Walther Jensen (seasons 1–4); Martin Marx (season 5); Nicolai Molbech (season 6) ???? (seasons 7–8)
- Opening theme: "House of Fire" by Jeanett Debb (season 1) "I See Right Through to You" by DJ Encore (season 1) "Watching Me" by Rebel Angels (season 4) "Mit Liv" by Cane ft. Phillip (season 10) "Mit Hjerte Kalder" by Ferrish Key (season 12) "Alt er Intet" by Svenstrup & Vendelboe (season 13)
- Country of origin: Denmark
- Original language: Danish
- No. of seasons: 13
- No. of episodes: 1,153

Production
- Production locations: Sluseholmen (seasons 1–2); Fornebu, Norway (season 3); Skovlunde (seasons 4–8)
- Production companies: Metronome Film & Television (seasons 1–5); Mastiff A/S (seasons 6–9); Endemol (seasons 10–13)

Original release
- Network: TvDanmark2
- Release: 28 January 2001 – 1 April 2004
- Network: Kanal 5
- Release: 31 January 2012 – 24 May 2014

Related
- Big Brother Live (2001–2014); Big Brother Talkshowet (2001–2004); Big Brother Director’s Cut (2012–2014)

Big Brother Danmark was the Danish version of the international reality television franchise Big Brother created by producer John de Mol Jr. The series debuted on Danish television in January 2001 and was axed in June 2014, due to poor ratings.

The show first aired two regular seasons on TvDanmark2 (Now Kanal 4) in 2001. The series returned once again in 2003 on TvDanmark2, first with a celebrity season called "V.I.P.", later that year TvDanmark2 aired the first regular Big Brother season in nearly two years. In 2004 TvDanmark2 aired one season before the show was paused indefinitely. The season was a celebrity season and was called "Reality Allstars".

After an eight-year break, Kanal 5 Denmark and SBS TV Denmark relaunched Big Brother Danmark in 2012. The show aired for three regular seasons (2012–2014).

The show was finally cancelled after 13 years by SBS Discovery on June 19, 2014, due to poor ratings.

In 2021, on the 20th anniversary of the first season in Denmark, Jill Liv Nielsen who won the first season back in 2001 was interviewed by the Danish public service broadcaster DR, for an article about the show.

== Series overview ==
Seasons		Launch date	Finale date	Days	Housemates	Winner	Prize money	Presenter	Extra Presenter(s)	Network
Original Run
1	Big Brother 2001 (1)	28 January 2001	10 May 2001	103	13	Jill Liv Nielsen	DKK 500,000	Lisbeth Janniche	Mads Vangsø and Anette Toftgaard	TvDanmark2
2	Big Brother 2001 (2)	25 August 2001	6 December 2001	104	14	Carsten B. Berthelsen	DKK 1,000,000	Lisbeth Janniche	Mads Vangsø, Anette Toftgaard and Jill Liv Nielsen	TvDanmark2
3	Big Brother V.I.P.	16 February 2003	22 May 2003	95	13	Thomas Bickham	DKK 500,000	Lisbeth Janniche	none	TvDanmark2
4	Big Brother 2003	21 September 2003	27 November 2003	68	16	Johnni Johansen	DKK 1,000,000	Lisbeth Janniche	none	TvDanmark2
5	Big Brother Reality Allstars	1 March 2004	1 April 2004	31	11	Jill Liv Nielsen	DKK 250,000	Lisbeth Janniche	none	TvDanmark2
2nd Run
6	Big Brother 2012	30 January 2012	13 May 2012	105	21	Amanda Heisel	DKK 625,000	Marie Egede	none	Kanal 5
7	Big Brother 2013	4 February 2013	18 May 2013	104	21	Bjørn Clausen	DKK 500.000	Anne Kejser	none	Kanal 5
8	Big Brother 2014	1 January 2014	27 April 2014	118	22	David G. Feldstedt	DKK 500.000	Anne Kejser	Oliver Bjerrehuus	Kanal 5

== Viewership ==
=== Ratings for the seasons of Big Brother Denmark ===
Seasons	Premiere	Average	Finale
Big Brother 2001 (1)	572.000	529.000	562.000
Big Brother 2001 (2)	403.000	365.000	259.000
Big Brother V.I.P.	354.000	275.000	192.000
Big Brother 2003	179.000	124.000	273.000
Big Brother Reality Allstars	76.000	64.000	136.000
Big Brother 2012	204.000	195.000	205.000
Big Brother 2013	119.000	105.000	127.000
Big Brother 2014	97.000	70.000	106.000

== Cancellation ==
SBS Discovery Media announced on 19 July 2014 that they had axed Big Brother Denmark, due to declining viewership . Season 13 (2014) had an average viewership of 70,000. which is a drop since the first season of Big Brother Denmark back in 2001, which had an average of 500,000 viewers. Eight years after the cancellation (2022), there are there still no plans of reviving the show in Denmark. Therefore, it is unknown when Big Brother will return to Denmark again.

== Big Brother 2001 (season 1) ==
Start Date: 28 January 2001
End Date: 10 May 2001

Duration: 103 days

The Finalists: 2 - Jill* (The Winner) & Nico* (Runner-up)

The Grand Prize: 500,000 DKK

Evicted Housemates: 8 - Anja, Anna, Chris, Eddie, Eva, John, Naja* & Suzanne*

Voluntary Exits: 3(7*) - Christian, Pil & Søren

Ejected Housemates: 0 -

Notes: * - Jill, Naja, Nico & Suzanne voluntarily left the House and later re-entered

On day 77, all the remaining housemates left the house. Two hours, later only four returned with agreement to get weekly visits by families and friends.

=== Nominations Table ===
The first person a housemate nominates is for 2 points, whilst the second nomination is for just 1 point.

	Week 2	Week 4	Week 6	Week 8	Week 10		Week 12	Week 13	Week 14	Week 15
	Week 2	Week 4	Week 6	Week 8	Intruder	Eviction	Week 12	Week 13	Week 14	Week 15
Jill	Pil, Eva	Chris, John	John, Søren	Søren, Eddie	Anna	Søren, Eddie	Søren, Naja	No nominations	No nominations	Winner (Day 103)
Nico	Eva, Pil	Chris, Anja	Pil, Anja	Anja, Jill	Anna	Pil, Jill	Pil, Naja	No nominations	No nominations	Runner-up (Day 103)
Naja	Not in House				Nominated	Eddie, Jill, Nico, Søren; Suzanne	Nico, Suzanne	No nominations	No nominations	Evicted (Day 96)
Suzanne	Eva, Chris	John, Chris	John, Søren	Eddie, Søren	Anna	Eddie, Søren	Naja, Søren	No nominations	Evicted (Day 89)	
Christian	Eva, Anja	Anja, John	Anja, John	Anja, Suzanne	Anna	Suzanne, Eddie	Suzanne, Naja	Walked (Day 77)		
Pil	Søren, Suzanne	Chris, Nico	Søren, John	Søren, Anja	Anna	Naja, Eddie	Naja, Nico	Walked (Day 77)		
Søren	Pil, Chris	Chris, Suzanne	Pil, Anja	Anja, Jill	Anna	Jill, Naja	Jill, Suzanne	Walked (Day 77)		
Eddie	Not in House		Exempt	Anja, Jill	Naja	Søren, Pil	Evicted (Day 68)			
Anna	Not in House				Nominated	Evicted (Day 58)				
Anja	Eva, Chris	Chris, John	John, Søren	Christian, Eddie	Evicted (Day 54)					
John	Exempt	Nico, Chris	Søren, Jill	Evicted (Day 40)						
Chris	Pil, Jill	Pil, Jull	Evicted (Day 26)							
Eva	Suzanne, Søren	Evicted (Day 12)								
Notes		none		none					none	
Nominated For Eviction	Eva, Pil	Chris, John	John, Søren	Anja, Søren	Anna, Naja	Eddie, Søren	Naja, Nico, Suzanne	Jill, Naja, Nico, Suzanne	Jill, Naja, Nico	Jill, Nico
Walked	none						Christian, Pil, Søren	none		
Evicted	Eva; 61% to evict	Chris; 53% to evict	John; 71% to evict	Anja; 84% to evict	Anna; 6 of 7 votes to evict	Eddie; 64% to evict	Eviction cancelled	Suzanne; 52% to evict	Naja; 60% to evict	Nico; 29% to win
Evicted	Eva; 61% to evict	Chris; 53% to evict	John; 71% to evict	Anja; 84% to evict	Anna; 6 of 7 votes to evict	Eddie; 64% to evict	Eviction cancelled	Suzanne; 52% to evict	Naja; 60% to evict	Jill; 71% to win

Notes:
^1 John was exempt from the Nomination Process as he entered late on Day 4.
^2 As a new Housemate, Eddie was exempt from the Nomination Process this Week.
^3 On Day 58, the Housemates had to evict one of the new Housemates, either Anna or Naja.
^4 After winning a task Naja won the right to distribute 5 points, instead of the usual 3, this Week. She could do this any way she liked, and chose to give one point each to Eddie, Jill, Nico, Søren and Suzanne.
^5 All Housemates voluntarily left the House on Day 77 and only Jill, Naja, Nico and Suzanne angrred to re-enter the House following talks with the producers on Day 78. The Nominations are voided and the Eviction is cancelled as only 4 Housemates now remain in the House: Jill, Naja, Nico & Suzanne.
^6 From now on all Housemates automatically face the Public Vote to evict, except for the final two who will face a vote to win.

== Big Brother 2001 (season 2) ==
Start Date: 25 August 2001
End Date: 6 December 2001

Duration: 104 days

The Prize: 1,000,000 DKK

The Finalists: 3 - Carsten (The Winner), Sverre (Runner-up) & Sheila (3rd)

Evicted Housemates: 9 - Aida, Dina, Ghazal, June, Martin, Randi, René, Søren & Tina

Voluntary Exits: 2 - Cosmo & Mik

=== Nominations Table ===
The first person a housemate nominates is for 2 points, whilst the second nomination is for just 1 point.

	Week 1	Week 2	Week 4	Week 6	Week 8	Week 10	Week 12	Week 14	Week 15		
	Week 1	Week 2	Week 4	Week 6	Week 8	Week 10	Week 12	Week 14	Day 102	Final	
Carsten	Aida	René, Dina	Randi, Mik	Randi, Sverre	Randi, Aida	Aida	Randi, Martin	Randi, Ghazal	No; Nominations	Winner (Day 104)	
Sverre	Aida	Tina, Dani	Mik, Dina	René, June	June, Aida	Aida	Randi, Sheila	Ghazal, Randi	No; Nominations	Runner up (Day 104)	
Sheila	Søren	Tina, Randi	Mik, Dina	Cosmo, René	Randi, Martin	Aida	Martin, Sverre	Randi, Ghazal	No; Nominations	Third Place (Day 104)	
Ghazal	Not in House					Martin	Martin; Randi	Randi; Sverre	No; Nominations	Evicted (Day 102)	
Randi	Sverre	Sheila, Tina	Carsten, Dina	René, Carsten	June, Carsten	Martin	Martin, Ghazal	Ghazal, Carsten	Evicted (Day 97)		
Martin	Not in House				3-Aida; 2-Cosmo	Nominated	Randi, Ghazal	Evicted (Day 83)			
Aida	Cosmo	Evicted (Day 4)			June, Martin	Nominated	Re-Evicted (Day 69)				
Cosmo	Aida	Mik, Sheila	Mik, Dina	June, Sheila	June, Aida	Walked (Day 69)					
June	Søren	Tina, Randi	Mik, Dina	Cosmo, Randi	Randi, Aida	Evicted (Day 55)					
René	Tina	Tina, Sheila	Mik, Randi	Randi, Sverre	Evicted (Day 41)						
Mik	Tina	Tina, Cosmo	June, Cosmo	Walked (Day 27)							
Dina	Søren	Randi, Tina	Randi, Sheila	Evicted (Day 27)							
Tina	Sverre	June, Sverre	Evicted (Day 13)								
Søren	Aida	Evicted (Day 4)									
Notes		none						none			
Walked	none			Mik	none	Cosmo	none				
Nominated For Eviction	Aida, Søren	Randi, Sheila, Tina	Dina, Mik, Randi	Cosmo, Randi, René	Aida, June, Randi	Aida, Martin	Ghazal, Martin	Ghazal, Randi	Carsten, Ghazal, Sheila, Sverre	Carsten, Sheila, Sverre	
Evicted	Aida; 4 of 6 votes to evict	Tina; 47% to evict	Dina; 53% to evict	Aida; Most votes to return	June; 59% to evict	Aida; 3 of 4 votes to evict	Martin; 50% to evict	Randi; 63% to evict	Ghazal; 58% to evict	Sheila; 24% (out of 3)	Sverre; 47% (out of 2)
Evicted	Søren; 3 of 6 votes to evict	Tina; 47% to evict	Dina; 53% to evict	René; 39% to evict	June; 59% to evict	Aida; 3 of 4 votes to evict	Martin; 50% to evict	Randi; 63% to evict	Ghazal; 58% to evict	Carsten; 53% to win	

Notes:
^7 The Housemates had to evict a male and a female. Each female voted to evict a male and each male voted to evict a female. The males are denoted by the blue boxes by their name, and the girls by the red boxes.
^8 On Day 34 Aida re-entered the House after a Public Vote, and was joined by Martin, a new Housemate.
^9 Martin was allowed to Nominate for 5 Points this Week, and distributed them as follows: Aida (3 points) and Cosmo (2 points).
^10 This Week the Public Nominated, and Aida and Martin received the most votes, and the surviving Housemates voted to Evict one of them. Ghazal, as a new Housemate, was Exempt from this Vote, but could vote and voted to Evict Martin.
^11 Randi was originally Nominated, but won immunity and hence Ghazal took her place. Martin was Evicted with just 71 more votes than Ghazal - the closest vote in Big Brother history.
^12 All Housemates faced the Public Vote to Evict this Week to decide the three finalists.
^13 The final three Housemates all faced the Public Vote to win.

== Big Brother V.I.P. (season 3) ==
Start Date: 16 February 2003
End Date: 22 May 2003
Duration: 95 days
The Prize: 500,000 DKK
No live coverage: Shown weekly over 12 weeks, starting 7 March. The final was shown on 22 May 2003.
House: The Big Brother Norway house was used
The Finalists: 3 - Thomas (The Winner)-51%, Pil (Runner-up)-27% & Michael (3rd)-22%
Evicted Housemates: 9 - Bashy, Brigitte, Carl-Mar, Gigi, Helena, Kira, Lise-Lotte, Masja & Morten
Ejected Housemates: 1 - Moses

=== Housemates ===
Housemates	Residence	Famous for...	Age
Bashy Quraishy	Frederiksberg	Pakistan People Society	57
Brigitte Nielsen	Switzerland	Actress	39
Carl-Mar Møller	Kokkedal	Therapist and author	49
Gigi Li Fredie-Pedersen	Dragør	Dancer, singer & actress	20
Helena Blach Lavrsen	Dragør	Silver medalist for Curling at the 1998 Winter Olympics	39
Kira Eggers	Los Angeles	Model and stripper	28
Lise-Lotte Lohmann	København	Actress	46
Masja Juel	Bornholm	Hairdresser	24
Michael Teschl	København	Singer	31
Morten Messerschmidt	Frederikssund	Politician	22
Moses Hansen	Kolding	Author	61
Helle Kragenskjold, "Pil"	Islands Brygge	Big Brother 1 Housemate	34
Thomas Bickham	København	Dragqueen	27

== Big Brother 2003 (season 4) ==
Start Date: 21 September 2003
End Date: 27 November 2003
Duration: 68 days
The Grand Prize: 1,000,000 DKK
The Finalists: 4 - Johnni (The Winner), Tania (Runner-up), Henrik (3rd) & Raz (4th)
Evicted Houseamtes: 7 - Cutter, Jesper, June, Kathrine, Makiah, Robert & Sissal
Voluntary Exits: 4 - Clara, Gry, Lotte & Martin
Ejected Housemates: 1 - Michael

=== Nominations Table ===
The first person a housemate nominates is for 2 points, whilst the second nomination is for just 1 point.

	Week 1	Week 3	Week 4	Week 5	Week 6	Week 7	Week 8	Week 9	Week 10	
Johnni	Cutter, Robert	Michael, Tania	Makiah, Kathrine	June, Tania	June, Henrik	Tania, June	Henrik, Tania	Robert, Henrik	Winner (Day 68)	
Tania	Cutter, Robert	Raz, Lotte	Kathrine, Robert	Henrik, Kathrine	Jesper, Johnni	Henrik, June	Robert, Sissal	Robert, Raz	Runner-up (Day 68)	
Henrik	Not in House		Exempt	Raz, Kathrine	Jesper, Johnni	Tania, Sissal	Sissal, Robert	Robert, Raz	Third Place (Day 68)	
Raz	Lotte, Clara	Michael, Tania	Tania, Kathrine	June, Henrik	June, Jesper	June, Henrik	Robert, Henrik	Henrik, Tania	Fourth Place (Day 68)	
Robert	Tania, Michael	Michael, Tania	Makiah, Kathrine	Henrik, June	Tania, Henrik	Henrik, June	Henrik, Tania	Henrik, Tania	Evicted (Day 61)	
Sissal	Michael, Johnni	Tania, Michael	Kathrine, Raz	Kathrine, June	Jesper, Henrik	June, Henrik	Henrik, Johnni	Evicted (Day 54)		
June	Not in House		Exempt	Raz, Kathrine	Jesper, Raz	Sissal, Raz	Evicted (Day 47)			
Jesper	Not in House			Exempt	Henrik, June	Evicted (Day 40)				
Kathrine	Not in House	Lotte, Johnni	Tania, Robert	Sissal, June	Evicted (Day 33)					
Makiah	Michael, Sissal	Lotte, Michael	Kathrine, Robert	Evicted (Day 26)						
Lotte	Johnni, Tania	Michael, Tania	Walked (Day 20)							
Martin	Clara, Tania	Raz, Tania	Walked (Day 16)							
Michael	Cutter, Clara	Lotte, Raz	Ejected (Day 15)							
Gry	Robert, Sissal	Walked (Day 13)								
Clara	Michael, Tania	Walked (Day 11)								
Cutter	Michael, Tania	Evicted (Day 5)								
Notes	none				none		none			
Nominated For Eviction	Cutter, Michael	Lotte, Michael, Robert, Tania	Kathrine, Makiah, Tania	Henrik, June, Kathrine	Henrik, Jesper, Jude	Henrik, June, Tania	Henrik, Robert, Sissal	Henrik, Raz, Robert, Tania	Henrik, Johnni, Raz, Tania	
Walked	none	Clara, Gry	Martin, Lotte	none						
Ejected	none	Michael	none							
Evicted	Cutter; 59% to evict	Eviction; Cancelled	Makiah; 58% to evict	Kathrine; 58% to evict	Jesper; 74% to evict	June; 37% to evict	Sissal; 52% to evict	Robert; 58% to evict	Raz; 12% to win	Henrik; 14% to win
Evicted	Cutter; 59% to evict	Eviction; Cancelled	Makiah; 58% to evict	Kathrine; 58% to evict	Jesper; 74% to evict	June; 37% to evict	Sissal; 52% to evict	Robert; 58% to evict	Tania; 30% to win	Johnni; 44% to win

=== Note ===
^14 Kathrine, as a new Housemates, is Exempt from Nomination this Week; she can Nominate but not be Nominated. Robert automatically faces the Public Vote this Week for rule-breaking. The Eviction was Cancelled after a spate of recent Walk-outs and Ejections.
^15 Henrik and June are Exempt from the Nominations Process as new Housemates.
^16 Jesper, as a New Housemates, is Exempt from the Nomination Process.
^17 Robert was immune from Nomination this Week after winning a challenge.
^18 Robert was awarded an extra Nomination Point this Week for blocking cameras.

== Big Brother – Reality Allstars (season 5) ==
Start Date: 1 March 2004
End Date: 1 April 2004
Duration: 31 days
The Winner: Jill Liv Nielsen
The Grand Prize: 250,000 DKK

=== Nominations Table ===
The first person a housemate nominates is for 2 points, whilst the second nomination is for just 1 point.

	#1	#2	#3	#4	#5	#6	Final	
Jill	Leslie; Lars	Carl-Mar; Naeem	Carl-Mar; Naeem	Carl-Mar; Allando	Allando; Lars	Allando; Clara	Winner (Day 32)	
Lars	Leslie; Clara	Clara; Lotte	Clara; Carl-Mar	Jill; Lotte	Lotte; Clara	Clara; Allando	Runner up (Day 32)	
Allando	Not in house		Exempt	Jill; Lotte	Lotte; Clara	Jill; Clara	Third place (Day 32)	
Franciska	Leslie; Carl-Mar	Carl-Mar; Lars	Carl-Mar; Lars	Allando; Lars	Allando; Lars	Allando; Jill	Fourth place (Day 32)	
Clara	Lars; Leslie	Carl-Mar; Naeem	Carl-Mar; Naeem	Carl-Mar; Lars	Lars; Allando	Allando; Jill	Evicted	
Lotte	Lars; Leslie	Naeem; Lars	Naeem; Carl-Mar	Allando; Jill	Allando; Lars	Evicted		
Carl-Mar	Leslie; Lotte	Jill; Lars	Jill; Lars	Jill; Clara	Evicted			
Naeem	Jill; Lars	Jill; Lotte	Lars; Clara	Evicted				
Richard	Lars; Lotte	Lotte; Lars	Walked					
Leslie	Lars; Jill	Evicted						
Allan	Walked							
Up for eviction	Lars; Leslie	Carl-Mar; Jill; Lars; Lotte; Naeem	Carl-Mar; Lars; Naeem	Allando; Carl-Mar; Jill	Allando; Lars; Lotte	Allando; Clara	All housemates	
Walked	Allan	Richard	none					
Evicted	Leslie; Most votes to evict	Eviction; Cancelled	Naeem; Most votes to evict	Carl-Mar; Most votes to evict	Lotte; Most votes to evict	Clara; Most votes to evict	Franciska; Fewest votes to win	Allando; Fewest votes to win
Evicted	Leslie; Most votes to evict	Eviction; Cancelled	Naeem; Most votes to evict	Carl-Mar; Most votes to evict	Lotte; Most votes to evict	Clara; Most votes to evict	Lars; Fewest votes to win	Jill; 46% to win

== Big Brother 2012 (season 6) ==
Start Date: 30 January 2012
End Date: 13 May 2012
Duration: 105 days
The Winner: Amanda Heisel
The Grand Prize: 500,000 DKK

=== Nominations table ===
	Week 1	Week 2	Week 3	Week 4	Week 5	Week 6	Week 7	Week 8	Week 9	Week 10	Week 11	Week 12	Week 13	Week 14	Week 15		Nominations received
Amanda	Lesley ? ?	Nominated	Mads Patricia	? ?	Melander Michella	Alexander Mads	Evicted(Day 42)	Cathrine Patricia CathrineHenrik	Nominated	Umar to save	Nominated	Alexander Michella	Nominated	Alexander Henrik	Winner (Day 105)		30
Henrik	Stine Alexander Alexander	Nominated	Amanda ?	Mads Melander	Mads Melander	Banned	Michella Mette	Mette Thomas	Nominated	Nominated	NoNominations	Thomas Alexander	Exempt	Amanda Alexander	Runner-Up(Day 105)		17
Umar	Lesley ? Stine	NoNominations	Amanda ?	Melander ?	Melander Michella	Patricia Cathrine	Michella Alexander	Michella Alexander MetteCathrine	NoNominations	Exempt	NoNominations	Thomas Michella	Exempt	Alexander Amanda	Third Place(Day 105)		5
Alexander	Lesley ? Umar	NoNominations	Stine ?	Lasse ?	Clifford Christian	Mads Amanda	Mette Denise	Mette Henrik MetteHenrik	NoNominations	Nominated	Nominated	Henrik Michella	Exempt	Amanda Henrik	Evicted(Day 98)		25
Michella	Lesley ? Stine	NoNominations	Patricia ?	Lasse Melander	Amanda Cathrine	Cathrine Patricia	Cathrine Patricia	Cathrine Henrik CathrineHenrik	NoNominations	NotEligible	Exempt	Amanda Umar	Nominated	Evicted(Day 91)			25
Thomas	Amanda Lesley Amanda	NoNominations	? Stine	Melander ?	Christian Melander	Amanda Mads	Michella Mette	Henrik Umar HenrikCathrine	NoNominations	Henrik	NoNominations	Henrik Amanda	Evicted(Day 84)				8
Cathrine	Lesley ? ?	NoNominations	Stine ?	? ?	Melander Michella	Banned	Michella Mads	Michella Alexander	Nominated	NotEligible	Nominated	Evicted(Day 77)					21
Patricia	Lesley ? Amanda	NoNominations	Stine ?	Melander ?	Michella Melander	Banned	Michella Mads	Alexander Michella MetteHenrik	NoNominations	Nominated	Evicted(Day 70)						9
Guido	Lesley ? ?	NoNominations	Banned	Christian ?	Christian Mads	Alexander Mads	Alexander Michella	Alexander Michella MetteCathrine	Nominated	Evicted(Day 63)							6
Mette	Not inHouse				Exempt	Cathrine Amanda	Denise Mads	Alexander Thomas	Evicted(Day 56)								14
Mads	Lesley ? Stine	Nominated	Amanda ?	Lasse ?	Melander Clifford	Amanda Guido	Thomas Denise	Evicted(Day 49)									22
Denise	Not inHouse				Exempt	Mads Amanda	Mads Guido	Ejected(Day 47)									4
Christian	Lesley Amanda Amanda	NoNominations	Stine ?	Guido ?	Guido Mads	Evicted(Day 35)											8
Melander	Lesley ? ?	NoNominations	Umar ?	Lasse ?	Clifford Christian Umar	Walked(Day 34)											25
Clifford	BunnieHouse	NoNominations	Stine ?	Melander ?	Melander Mads	Ejected(Day 34)											5
Lasse	BunnieHouse	NoNominations	Stine ?	Melander Mads	Evicted(Day 28)												8
Stine	Lesley ? Amanda	NoNominations	? ?	Evicted(Day 21)													20
Line	Louise Lesley ?	Nominated	Evicted(Day 14)														0
Louise	Stine ? ?	Evicted(Day 7)															8
Nicolai	BunnieHouse	Evicted(Day 7)															0
Lesley	Cathrine Patricia	Walked(Day 3)															24
Notes	1, 2	3	4	5	6	7, 8	none	9, 10	11	12, 13	14	none	15	16	none		
Up for eviction	Amanda, ~~Lesley~~, Louise	Amanda Henrik, Line, Mads	Alexander, Stine, Umar	Lasse, Melander	~~Melander~~, Christian, Umar	Amanda, Mads	Michella, Mads	Alexander, Cathrine, Mette, Michella	Amanda, Cathrine, Henrik, Guido	Alexander, Amanda, Henrik, Patricia	Alexander, Amanda, Cathrine	Henrik, Thomas	Amanda, Michella	Alexander, Amanda	Amanda, Henrik, Umar		
Up for eviction	~~Clifford~~, Lasse, Nicolai	Amanda Henrik, Line, Mads	Alexander, Stine, Umar	Lasse, Melander	~~Melander~~, Christian, Umar	Amanda, Mads	Michella, Mads	Alexander, Cathrine, Mette, Michella	Amanda, Cathrine, Henrik, Guido	Alexander, Amanda, Henrik, Patricia	Alexander, Amanda, Cathrine	Henrik, Thomas	Amanda, Michella	Alexander, Amanda	Amanda, Henrik, Umar		
Walked	Lesley	none			Melander	none											
Ejected	none				Clifford	none	Denise	none									
Evicted	LouiseFewest votes to save	LineFewest votes to save	StineFewest votes to save	LasseFewest votes to save	ChristianFewest votes to save	AmandaFewest votes to save	MadsFewest votes to save	MetteFewest votes (out of 3) to save	GuidoFewest votes to save	PatriciaFewest votes (out of 3) to save	CathrineFewest votes to save	ThomasFewest votes to save	MichellaFewest votes to save	AlexanderFewest votes to save	UmarFewest votes to win	HenrikFewest votes to win	
Evicted	NicolaiFewest votes to save	LineFewest votes to save	StineFewest votes to save	LasseFewest votes to save	ChristianFewest votes to save	AmandaFewest votes to save	MadsFewest votes to save	MetteFewest votes (out of 3) to save	GuidoFewest votes to save	PatriciaFewest votes (out of 3) to save	CathrineFewest votes to save	ThomasFewest votes to save	MichellaFewest votes to save	AlexanderFewest votes to save	AmandaMost votes to win		

== Big Brother 2013 (season 7) ==
Start Date: 4 February 2013
End Date: 18 May 2013
Duration: 104 days
The Winner: Bjørn Clausen
The Grand Prize: 500,000 DKK

=== Nominations table ===
	Week 1	Week 2	Week 3	Week 4	Week 5	Week 6	Week 7	Week 8	Week 9	Week 10	Week 11	Week 12	Week 13	Week 14	Week 15				Nominations received
	Week 1	Week 2	Week 3	Week 4	Week 5	Week 6	Week 7	Week 8	Week 9	Week 10	Week 11	Week 12	Week 13	Week 14	Day 100	Day 101	Finale		Nominations received
Bjørn	Tarik Camilla	Tarik David	NoNominations	Lene Hartmann	David Lene	NoNominations	NoNominations	NoNominations	Nominated	Katja Hartmann	Tarik Katja	Exempt	Katja Tania	NoNominations	NotEligible	Silas to save	Winner(Day 104)		13
Silas	Not inHouse					NoNominations	NoNominations	NoNominations	Exempt	Hartmann Katja	Camilla Tarik	Nominated	Katja Tania	NoNominations	NotEligible	Nominated	Runner-Up(Day 104)		11
Victor	Camilla Tarik	Tarik Camilla	NoNominations	Julie Hartmann	Evicted(Day 27)					Julie Hartmann	Dennis	Nominated	Katja Tania	Nominated	NotEligible	Tania to save	Third Place(Day 104)		8
Tania	Camilla Lene	Lene Camilla	NoNominations	Julie Victor	Camilla David	NoNominations	Exempt	NoNominations	NoNominations	Julie Hartmann	Hartmann Camilla	NoNominations	Silas Bjørn	NoNominations	Camilla to evict	Nominated	Evicted(Day 101)		12
Camilla	Tarik Lene	Aissatou Hartmann	Nominated	Katja Dennis	Hartmann Katja	NoNominations	NoNominations	Exempt	Nominated	Tarik Hartmann	Hartmann Katja	NoNominations	Katja Tania	Nominated	Nominated	Evicted(Day 100)			55
Dennis	Shawn Camilla	Bjørn Ronni	NoNominations	Victor Julie	Julie Hartmann	NoNominations	NoNominations	NoNominations	NoNominations	Julie Silas	Hartmann Katja	NoNominations	Silas Bjørn	Nominated	Evicted(Day 97)				8
Katja	Camilla Bjørn	Lene Ronni	NoNominations	Victor Julie	Julie Hartmann	Nominated	Evicted(Day 41)			Silas Julie	Silas Camilla	NoNominations	Silas Bjørn	Re-Evicted(Day 90)					30
Tarik	Camilla Shawn	Hartmann Camilla	NoNominations	Julie Camilla	Hartmann Camilla	NoNominations	NoNominations	NoNominations	Exempt	Julie Camilla	Silas Bjørn	Nominated	Evicted(Day 83)						15
Hartmann	Camilla Shawn	Camilla Ronni	Nominated	Julie Victor	Ronni Camilla	Evicted(Day 34)				Silas Julie	Camilla Tarik	Re-Evicted(Day 76)							35
Julie	SecretCaravan	Katja Camilla	NoNominations	Katja Hartmann	Hartmann Ronni	NoNominations	NoNominations	NoNominations	Evicted(Day 55)	Dennis Hartmann	Re-Evicted(Day 69)								30
Lene	Camilla Shawn	Camilla Ronni	NoNominations	Camilla Victor	Tania Camilla	NoNominations	NoNominations	NoNominations	Nominated	Evicted(Day 62)									14
David	Camilla Bjørn	Bjørn Camilla	NoNominations	Julie Victor	Hartmann Camilla	NoNominations	Nominated	Nominated	Ejected(Day 59)										4
Ronni	Camilla Dennis	Hartmann Lene	NoNominations	Hartmann Julie	Hartmann Lene	Nominated	NoNominations	NoNominations	Ejected(Day 59)										8
Danijel	Not inHouse					Nominated	NoNominations	Nominated	Evicted(Day 55)										N/A
Malene	Not inHouse					NoNominations	Nominated	Evicted(Day 48)											N/A
Phillip	Katja Camilla	Katja Camilla	NoNominations	Julie Camilla	Camilla Julie	NoNominations	Nominated	Evicted(Day 48)											0
Aissatou	Tania Dennis	Katja Camilla	Nominated	Evicted(Day 20)															2
Bianca	Camilla Lene	Lene Ronni	Evicted(Day 13)																N/A
Simone	SecretCaravan	Walked(Day 9)																	N/A
Elise	Shawn Camilla	Left(Day 8)																	N/A
Shawn	Dennis Camilla	Evicted(Day 6)																	7
Martin	Ejected(Day 5)																		N/A
Notes	1, 2, 3, 4	5, 6	7	8	none	9	10	11	12	13	14	15	16	17	18	19	none		
Nominated	Camilla Shawn Tarik	Bianca Camilla Julie Katja Lene	Aissatou Camilla Hartmann	Hartmann Julie Victor	Camilla Hartmann Julie	Danijel Katja Ronni	David Malene Phillip	Danijel David	Bjørn Camilla Lene	Hartmann Julie Silas	Camilla Dennis Hartmann	Silas Tarik Victor	Katja Silas Tania	Camilla Dennis Victor	Camilla	Silas Tania	Bjørn Silas Victor		
Walked	none	Simone	none																
Ejected	Martin	none							DavidRonni	none									
Evicted	ShawnFewest votes to save	BiancaFewest votes to save	AissatouFewest votes to save	VictorFewest votes to save	HartmannFewest votes to save	KatjaFewest votes to save	MaleneFewest votes to save	JulieAutomatically evicted	LeneFewest votes to save	JulieFewest votes to save	HartmannFewest votes to save	TarikFewest votes to save	KatjaFewest votes to save	DennisFewest votes to save	CamillaTania's choice to evict	TaniaLost challenge	VictorFewest votes to win	SilasFewest votes to win	
Evicted	ShawnFewest votes to save	BiancaFewest votes to save	AissatouFewest votes to save	VictorFewest votes to save	HartmannFewest votes to save	KatjaFewest votes to save	PhillipFewest votes to save	DanijelFewest votes to save	LeneFewest votes to save	JulieFewest votes to save	HartmannFewest votes to save	TarikFewest votes to save	KatjaFewest votes to save	DennisFewest votes to save	CamillaTania's choice to evict	TaniaLost challenge	BjørnMost votes to win		

== Big Brother 2014 (season 8) ==
Start Date: 1 January 2014
End Date: 27 April 2014
Duration: 119 days
The Winner: David G. Feldstedt
The Grand Prize: 500,000 DKK

=== Nominations table ===
	Week 1	Week 2	Week 3	Week 4	Week 5	Week 6	Week 7	Week 8	Week 9	Week 10	Week 11	Week 12	Week 13	Week 14	Week 15	Week 16	Week 17			
	Week 1	Week 2	Week 3	Week 4	Week 5	Week 6	Week 7	Week 8	Week 9	Week 10	Week 11	Week 12	Week 13	Week 14	Week 15	Week 16	Day 113	Day 114	Finale	
David	Not in House								Mark; Frida	Rasmus; Mark	Ginna; Camilla	Jimmi; Jonathan	Camilla; Nicki	Rasmus; Jimmi	Not; Eligible	Nominated	No; Nominations	Nominated	Winner (Day 119)	
Nirvana	Malene; Sandra	Sandra; Ginna	Sandra; Ginna	Jimmi; Ginna	Sandra; Karoline	No; Nominations	Not; Eligible	Karsten; Cecilie	David; Andreas	David; Ronnie	Mark; Camilla	Jimmi; David	Not; Eligible	Jimmi; Frida	4-Rasmus; 3-Nicki; 2-David	Exempt	No; Nominations	No; Nominations	Runner-Up (Day 119)	
Ronnie	Not in House			Ginna; Jimmi	Sandra; Ginna	No; Nominations	Not; Eligible	Andreas; Jonathan	Mark; Frida	Mark; Jonathan	Ginna; Camilla	Jimmi; Jonathan	Camilla; Nicki	Rasmus; Jimmi	3-Rasmus	Nominated	No; Nominations	No; Nominations	Third place (Day 119)	
Ginna	Sandra; Nicki	Klaus; Sandra	Sandra; Karoline	Kenneth; Jonathan	Karoline; Sandra	No; Nominations	Ronnie; Sandra	Karsten; Jonathan	Camilla; Jonathan	Ronnie; David	Mark; Camilla	Jonathan; Ronnie	Not; Eligible	Mark; Frida	Not; Eligible	Exempt	Nominated	Nominated	Evicted (Day 117)	
Nicki	Malene; Ginna	Sandra; Johannes	Ginna; Sandra	Ginna; Jonathan	Sandra; Ginna	No; Nominations	Evicted (Day 42)				Frida; Camilla	Jonathan; Jimmi	Not; Eligible	Rasmus; Jimmi	Not; Eligible	Exempt	Nominated	Nominated	Re-Evicted (Day 117)	
Frida	Not in House				Exempt	No; Nominations	Not; Eligible	Andreas; Cecilie	Camilla; David	Jonathan; Ronnie	Mark; Ginna	Nicki; Jimmi	Not; Eligible	Jimmi; Mark	Not; Eligible	Exempt	Nominated	Evicted (Day 113)		
Jimmi	Banned	Karoline; Sandra	Sandra; Karoline	Karoline; Kenneth	Karoline; Cecilie	No; Nominations	Not; Eligible	Cecilie; Ronnie	Camilla; David	Ronnie; David	Camilla; Mark	Jonathan; Ronnie	Nirvana; Nicki	Mark; Ronnie	2-Nicki; 1-Frida	Nominated	Evicted (Day 112)			
Rasmus	Banned	Klaus; Sandra	Sandra; Mark	Kenneth; Jonathan	Karoline; Ronnie	No; Nominations	Sandra; Ronnie	Ronnie; Cecilie	Andreas; Frida	Karsten; David	Camilla; Mark	Nicki; Camilla	Nirvana; Nicki	Mark; Ronnie	6-Nicki	Evicted (Day 105)				
Mark	Sabina; Ginna	Sandra; Ginna	Sandra; Ginna	Ginna; Jonathan	Sandra; Ginna	No; Nominations	Ronnie; Sandra	Karsten; Cecilie	Frida; David	David; Karsten	Camilla; Frida	Jonathan; Jimmi	Camilla; Nirvana	Jimmi; David	Evicted (Day 98)					
Camilla	Not in House								Mark; Jonathan	Karsten; Ginna	Mark; Ginna	Ginna; David	Not; Eligible	Evicted (Day 91)						
Jonathan	Not in House			Kenneth; Ginna	Ginna; Sandra	No; Nominations	Not; Eligible	Cecilie; Ronnie	Andreas; Frida	Ronnie; Karsten	Camilla; Mark	Nicki; Ronnie	Evicted (Day 84)							
Cecilie	Not in House				Mark; Ginna	No; Nominations	Andreas; Mark	Jonathan; Andreas	Evicted (Day 56)		Frida; Mark	Re-Evicted (Day 77)								
Karsten	Ginna; Nirvana	Sandra; Johannes	Sandra; Ginna	Kenneth; Jonathan	Karoline; Sandra	No; Nominations	Nominated	Frida; Jonathan	Mark; Frida	Rasmus; Mark	Evicted (Day 70)									
Andreas	Not in House				Exempt	No; Nominations	Ronnie; Sandra	Jonathan; Ronnie	Jonathan; Ginna	Evicted (Day 63)										
Sandra	Malene; Ginna	Karoline; Nicki	Jimmi; Ginna	Jimmi; Nirvana	Mark; Ginna	No; Nominations	Ronnie; Nirvana	Evicted (Day 49)												
Karoline	Sabina; Sandra	Sandra; Klaus	Sandra; Ginna	Kenneth; Ginna	Ginna; Sandra	Evicted (Day 35)														
Kenneth	Not in House		Ginna; Karsten	Jimmi; Karoline	Evicted (Day 28)															
Johannes	Banned	Karoline; Klaus	Nirvana; Sandra	Evicted (Day 21)																
Klaus	Ginna; Sandra	Sandra; Ginna	Evicted (Day 14)																	
Patrich	Banned	Ejected (Day 13)																		
Sabina	Malene; Sandra	Walked (Day 11)																		
Malene	Sabina; Sandra	Evicted (Day 7)																		
Notes	1, 2	none	3	4, 5	none	6	7	none	8, 9	10, 11, 12	13	14, 15	16	17, 18	19	20	21	22	none	
Up for eviction	Ginna; Malene; Sandra	Karoline; Klaus; Sandra	Johannes; Rasmus; Sandra	Ginna; Jimmi; Kenneth	Ginna; Karoline; Sandra	none	Karsten; Ronnie; Sandra	Cecilie; Jonathan; Karsten	Andreas; Camilla; Frida; Mark	David; Karsten; Ronnie	Camilla; Cecilie; Nicki	Jimmi; Jonathan; Nicki	Camilla; Nicki; Nirvana	Jimmi; Mark; Rasmus	David; Nicki; Rasmus	David; Jimmi; Ronnie	Frida; Ginna; Nicki	David; Ginna; Nicki	David; Nirvana; Ronnie	
Walked	none	Sabina	none																	
Ejected	none	Patrich	none																	
Evicted	Malene; Fewest votes to save	Klaus; Fewest votes to save	Johannes; Fewest votes to save	Kenneth; Fewest votes to save	Karoline; Fewest votes to save	Nicki; Automatically evicted	Sandra; Fewest votes to save	Cecilie; Fewest votes to save	Andreas; Fewest votes to save	Karsten; Fewest votes to save	Cecilie; Fewest votes to save	Jonathan; Fewest votes to save	Camilla; Fewest votes to save	Mark; Fewest votes to save	Rasmus; Fewest votes to save	Jimmi; Fewest votes to save	Frida; Ex-housemates' choice to evict	Nicki; Fewest votes to save	Ronnie; Fewest votes to win	Nirvana; Fewest votes to win
Evicted	Malene; Fewest votes to save	Klaus; Fewest votes to save	Johannes; Fewest votes to save	Kenneth; Fewest votes to save	Karoline; Fewest votes to save	Nicki; Automatically evicted	Sandra; Fewest votes to save	Cecilie; Fewest votes to save	Andreas; Fewest votes to save	Karsten; Fewest votes to save	Cecilie; Fewest votes to save	Jonathan; Fewest votes to save	Camilla; Fewest votes to save	Mark; Fewest votes to save	Rasmus; Fewest votes to save	Jimmi; Fewest votes to save	Frida; Ex-housemates' choice to evict	Ginna; Fewest votes to save	David; Most votes to win	
