= The Fairytaler =

2002–2003 Danish animated television series

- Genre: Animation; Anthology; Fantasy; Adventure; Cartoon series
- Written by: Hans Christian Andersen
- Directed by: Jørgen Lerdam
- Voices of: Henrik Koefoed; Ditte Gråbøl; Thomas Mørk; Søren Spanning; Kaya Brüel; Nikolaj Lie Kaas; Nicola Coughlan
- Narrated by: Henrik Koefoed
- Countries of origin: Denmark; Ireland; Germany
- Original languages: Danish; English; German
- No. of seasons: 1
- No. of episodes: 26 (31 segments)

Production
- Executive producers: Ralph Chrisitians; Tom Van Waveran; Poul Kofod; Andres Mastrup
- Producers: Michael Christensen; Daina Sacco; Maeve McAdam
- Running time: 26 min.
- Production companies: Egmont Imagination; A. Film Production; Magma Films

Original release
- Network: Super RTL (Germany)
- Release: 30 November 2003

The Fairytaler (Danish: Der var engang...) is an animated television series based on the fairy tales of Hans Christian Andersen. It was the second anthology series adapted from Hans Christian Andersen's works after Andersen Stories.

The series premiered in Germany on Super RTL on November 30, 2003. In Denmark, it debuted on May 13, 2004, on DR1 with two episodes, and then resumed on December 27.

An English dub was eventually produced in later years.

== List of episodes ==
1. The Little Mermaid
2. The Emperor's New Clothes
3. The Nightingale
4. The Tinderbox
5. The Ugly Duckling
6. The Wild Swans
7. The Hardy Tin Soldier
8. The Travelling Companion
9. The Swineherd
10. The Flying Trunk
11. The Beetle
12. What the Old Man Does is Right
13. The Galoshes of Fortune
14. The Golden Treasure
15. The Professor and the Flea
16. The Fir-Tree
17. The Snow Queen, Part 1
18. The Snow Queen, Part 2
19. The Snowman (half-long episode)
20. The Bottleneck
21. Thumbelina
22. The Jumper (half-long episode)
23. Jack The Fool
24. It's Quite True (half-long episode)
25. Ollie Shuteye (half-long episode)
26. The Lovers (half-long episode)
27. Little Ida's Flowers (half-long episode)
28. The Princess and the Pea (half-long episode)
29. The Gardener and the Family (half-long episode)
30. Sausage Peg Soup (half-long episode)
31. The Old Street Lamp (half-long episode)

== Production ==
Development for the series began in December 1999, when Egmont's animation unit Egmont Imagination had collaborated with Irish animation company Magma Films to develop and produce a traditionally animated anthology TV series adaptation that would bring all of Hans Christian Andersen's works under one programme in order to celebrate the 200th anniversary of Hans Christian Andersen in 2005 with the former handling a distribution. Later in April 2000, during production, the series became a Danish/Irish/German co-production when Munich-based German kids & family entertainment company EM.TV & Merchandising had joined to the production alongside Egmont Imagination and Magma Films with EM.TV sharing distribution rights to the series with Egmont Imagination. EM.TV & Merchandising later dropped out from the production when the series was renamed to HC: Andersen, becoming a Danish/Irish co-production and A.Film Production (who produced the film Help! I'm a Fish with Egmont Imagination) took over and handled the series' animation, while the broadcaster DR ordered the series to air on the network alongside German TV channel Super RTL.

== Broadcast ==
Toon-A-Vision began broadcasting the series in Canada in 2022.
