= TV4 Media =

Swedish media holding company

TV4 Media AB
- Formerly: Bonnier Broadcasting AB (2016–2019)
- Type: Incentive
- Founded: 2016; 10 years ago
- Headquarters: Stockholm, Sweden
- Key people: Mathias Berg (CEO)
- Owner: Bonnier Group (2016–2019); Telia Company (2019–2025); Schibsted (2025–present)
- Website: tv4media.se

TV4 Media AB (formerly Bonnier Broadcasting AB) is a Swedish media holding company which is currently a part of the Norwegian media group Schibsted, having acquired it from Swedish telecommunications company Telia Company. The company owns Swedish commercial broadcaster TV4 AB, Finnish commercial broadcaster MTV Oy, and pan-Nordic premium television channel operator C More Entertainment.

The company was formed as Bonnier Broadcasting AB in 2016 to serve as a holding company of broadcasting businesses then-owned by Bonnier – the function previously held by TV4 AB (which subsequently dropped the "TV4-gruppen" trade name). Bonnier had acquired those broadcasting companies through a series of acquisition in 2000s. On 20 July 2018, Telia Company announced the acquisition proposal of Bonnier Broadcasting. The deal was completed on 2 December 2019, following an approval from the European Commission.

== Background ==
In 2005, it was announced that Bonnier Group and Proventus would acquire MTV Oy from Alma Media.

In November 2006, it was announced that Bonnier and Proventus would buy the share in the TV4's operating company that was then held by Schibsted. The deal was approved in December 2006, making TV4 almost entirely owned by Nordic Broadcasting Oy, a company owned jointly by Bonnier and Proventus. Proventus sold its shares in Nordic Broadcasting to Bonnier in March 2007, making it a fully owned subsidiary of Bonnier.

On 16 June 2008, TV4-Gruppen announced it had acquired C More Entertainment from ProSiebenSat.1 Media for €320 million.

== Sale to Telia Company ==
On 20 July 2018, Telia Company announced the acquisition proposal of the Bonnier Broadcasting Group for 9.2 billion SEK (roughly $1 billion). The acquisition was expected to end in the second half of 2019, following regulatory approval.

There were concerns that the merger would diminish media diversity in Sweden: although Telia, previously a state telecommunication monopoly, was privatised in 1992, the Swedish Government still owns the 37.3% of the share, thus the major network would come under the indirect control of the Swedish government, which already provides public service television broadcasting through SVT. Mikael Damberg, Swedish Minister for Enterprise and Innovation at that time, was quoted by the TT News Agency as saying that both the media diversity and strong economic foundation for the deal would be considered, but the government would not sell its stake in Telia Company even after the deal was secured. A Moderate Party spokesperson issued a statement, saying that the government's long-term agenda should be selling its stake in the telecommunications company.

On 15 March 2019, Telia Company formally notified the European Commission of the acquisition, triggering phase 1 investigation. On 10 May, the European Commission launched the in-depth, phase 2 investigation over the deal, as there were other concerns regarding network neutrality and eliminating competitions (for example, removing Bonnier Broadcasting's television channels and its programming libraries from rival multichannel TV platforms and streaming services, offering Bonnier Broadcasting's free-to-air channels through bundled deals for Telia's customers, denying customers of rival ISPs and MNOs from accessing to Bonnier Broadcasting's streaming services, removing advertisements of Telia's competitors from Bonnier Broadcasting's advertising inventories), especially in Sweden and Finland, where Telia Company operates IPTV services. Prior to the formal launch of the phase 2 investigation, Reuters reported that Telia Company offered concessions to the Commission in April that year, but these were deemed not sufficient to relieve the concerns.

Telia Company appeared to have offered another concessions to the European Commission over the deal on 12 August 2019, but the details were not provided at that time. In early September that year, news reports detailing Telia Company's concessions were surfaced.

On 20 October 2019, Telia Company proposed that Marie Ehrling be succeeded by Lars-Johan Jarnheimer, the former CEO of Tele2 until 2008 and then-chair of Egmont Media, as the company's board chair, ahead of the deal's completion. The proposal was approved on 26 November that year, following the extraordinary general meeting. Meanwhile, on 24 October, Telia Company appointed Allison Kirkby, the former CEO of Tele2 from 2015 until 2018 and then went on to become the president and CEO of TDC, as the company's new president and CEO. Kirkby is expected take the role during the second quarter of 2020.

On 12 November 2019, the European Commission approved Telia Company's bid to take over Bonnier Broadcasting from Bonnier Group. Per approval, Telia Company agreed that it would offer Bonnier Broadcasting's television channels to rival TV providers in Sweden and Finland on fair, reasonable and non-discriminatory terms (FRAND), license standalone OTT rights to one competing provider in each of Sweden and Finland, open advertising inventories to Telia's competitors in Sweden and Finland on FRAND terms, and provide a package of Liiga (men's top-tier professional ice hockey league in Finland, which Telia Finland has broadcasting rights beginning with the 2018–19 season) TV channels to rival TV providers in Finland on FRAND terms. In a separate statement, Marie Ehrling, who was still Telia Company's chair of the board at the time, was quoted as saying "As a media owner, Telia Company will ensure that continued editorial independence is upheld vis-à-vis the owners, Board and management". The acquisition was completed on 2 December that year, after which the company was renamed TV4 Media AB.

== Sale to Schibsted Media ==
On 25 February 2025, Schibsted Media announced the acquisition proposal of the TV4 Media for 6.55 billion SEK. The acquisition was completed on July 1, 2025.

== Assets ==
TV4 AB

- TV4
  - TV4 Play
- Sjuan
- TV12
- TV4 Film
- TV4 Fakta
- TV4 Guld
- TV4 Hits
- TV4 Stars
- SF-kanalen
- TV4 Sportkanalen
- TV4 Fotboll
- TV4 Hockey
- TV4 Motor
- TV4 Tennis
- TV4 Sport Live

MTV Oy

- MTV3
  - MTV Katsomo
- MTV Sub
- MTV Ava
- MTV Aitio
- MTV Viihde
- MTV Urheilu 1
- MTV Urheilu 2
- MTV Urheilu 3
- MTV Max
- MTV Juniori
