= MTV Sarja =

Finnish television channel

- Country: Finland

Ownership
- Owner: MTV Oy
- Sister channels: MTV3 (HD); Sub; AVA; MTV Max (HD); MTV Sport 1 (HD); MTV Sport 2 (HD); MTV Fakta; MTV Leffa; MTV Juniori; MTV Fakta XL; MTV Komedia

History
- Launched: 1 March 2008
- Closed: 31 March 2014

Links
- Website: www.mtv3.fi/sarja

MTV Sarja was a Finnish television channel owned and operated by MTV3, in cooperation with the TV4 Group. It was a Finnish version of TV4 Guld.
