= Television in Finland =

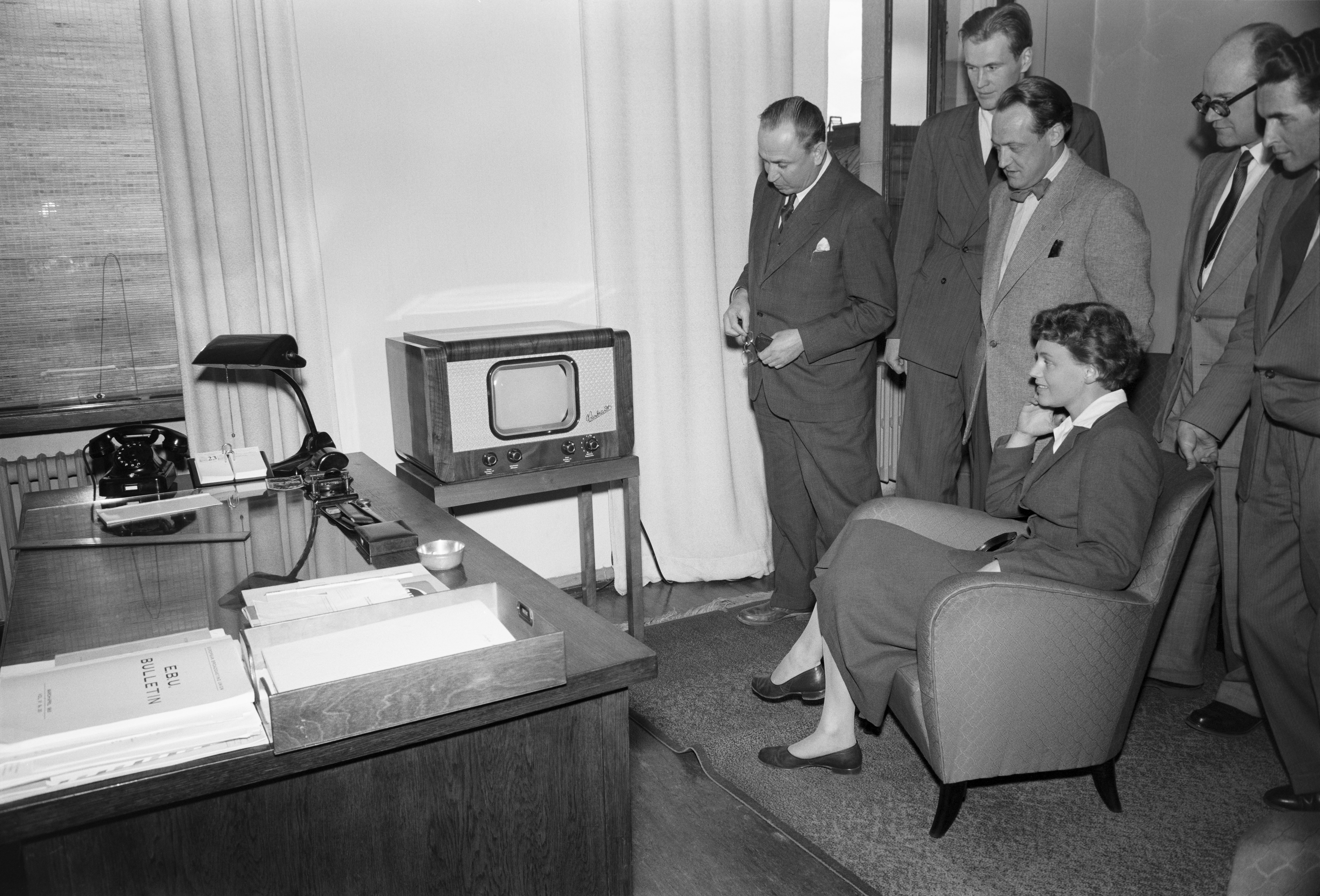
People gather to watch the first television transmission of Finland in May 1955.

Television was introduced in Finland in 1955. Color television started in 1969 and was introduced gradually, with most programs in color by the late 1970s. All terrestrial analogue stations stopped broadcasting on 1 September 2007 after the introduction of digital television; cable providers were allowed to continue analog broadcasting in their networks until 1 March 2008.

Typically, foreign-language content is subtitled, retaining the original language soundtrack. This includes interview responses in news or magazine programmes not given in the main language of that programme. Foreign programming intended for children is, however, usually dubbed into one of the national languages. Regardless of the intended audience or original language, many shows receive a Finnish and/or Swedish title which is used in programme schedules.

In 2016 it was said that 47% of people watch via terrestrial antenna, 43% via cable, 11% via IPTV and 4% via satellite.

== History ==
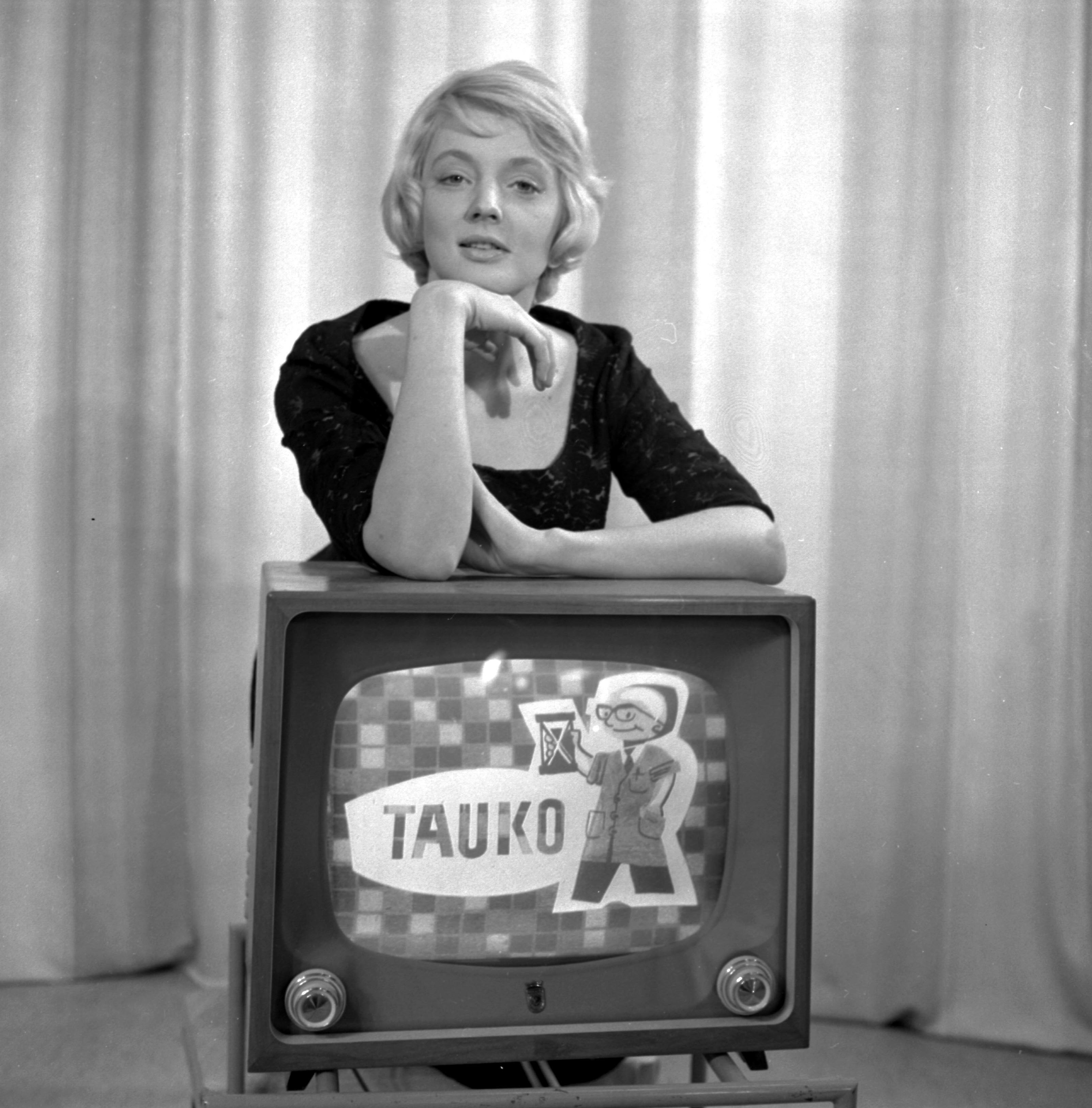
Finnish Broadcasting Company announcer Teija Sopanen.(1959)

On 24 May 1955, the first public television broadcast in Finland was aired by the Radioinsinööriseura (later Elektroniikkainsinöörien seura). The project eventually developed into TES-TV (later Tesvisio), the first television channel in Finland that began regular broadcasts on 21 March 1956. The public broadcaster Yleisradio began their television project in 1957, with regular broadcasts starting from 1 January 1958. Suomen Televisio (now Yle TV1), as the channel was called, also featured commercial programming from MTV, a separate channel that leased programming blocks from Yleisradio. This arrangement would last until 1993.

Yleisradio acquired Tesvisio in 1964 and reorganized its assets into a second TV channel (now Yle TV2). Despite MTV's demands that the second channel be in their control, Yleisradio maintained ownership of the second channel but sold MTV more time on it. In 1986, a third channel Kolmoskanava was introduced as a joint venture between Yleisradio, MTV and Nokia. MTV gradually purchased Kolmoskanava into their ownership and in 1993, turned it into MTV3. Once MTV3 was introduced, MTV moved all of its programming there. Finland's early adoption of satellite and cable television led to technology's tie to information society policies of the 1990s. The state control of means of media including television continued until early 2000s when the government allowed commercial television.

Since 2021, around 75% of the Finnish population watch television content online via YouTube, Vimeo, and other, in addition to online TV broadcasting companies.

== Finnish programming ==
=== MTV3 ===
Finnish TV-series Salatut elämät ("Secret Lives", literally "Concealed Lives")

- Bosch
- Broadchurch
- CSI: Crime Scene Investigation
- CSI: Miami
- CSI: NY
- Crisis
- Emmerdale
- Hostages
- Legends
- Madam Secretary
- Major Crimes
- NCIS: New Orleans
- Prison Break
- Survivor
- The Amazing Race
- The Apprentice
- The Bold and the Beautiful
- The Closer
- The Mentalist
- The Night Manager
- Wallander
- 24

=== Diva Channel ===
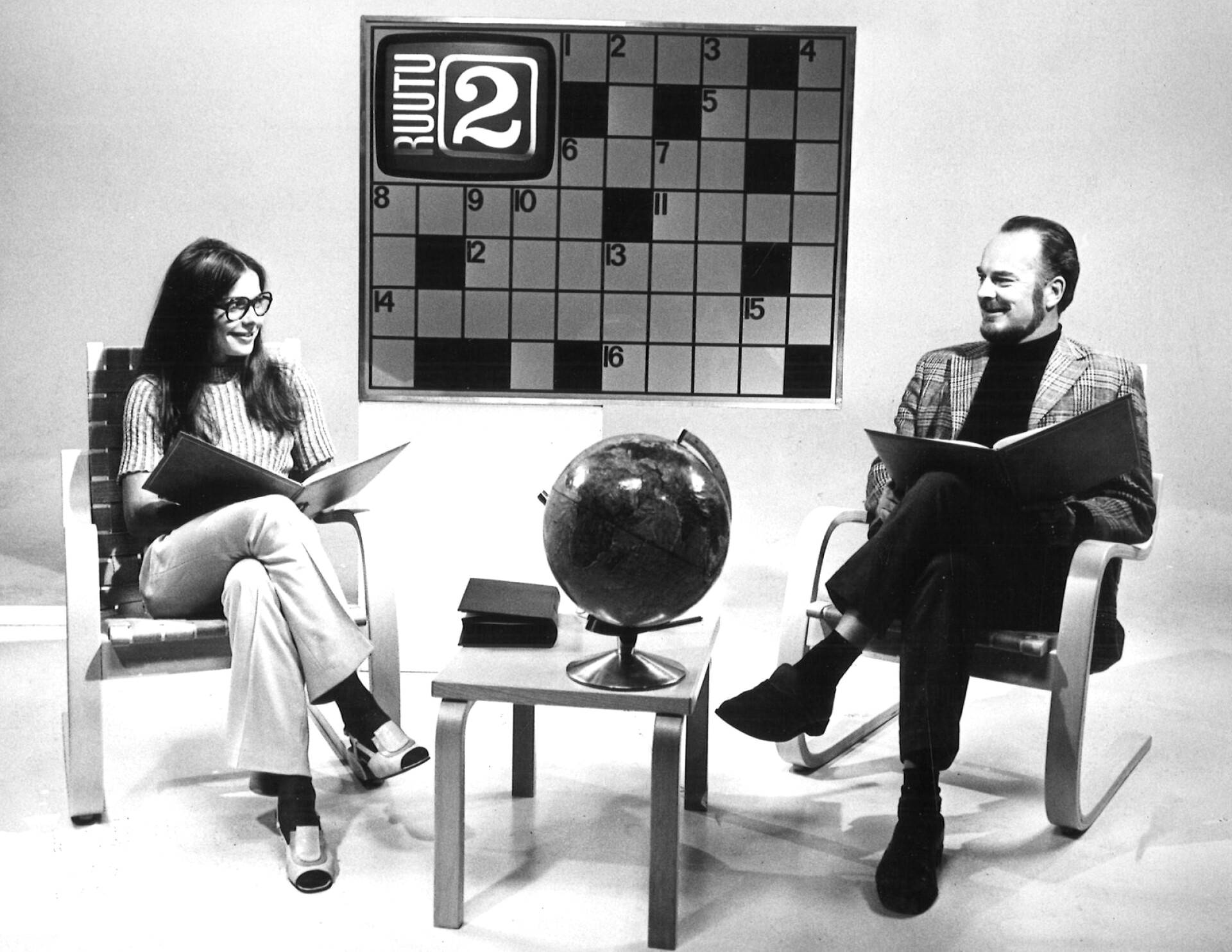
Promotional photograph for Yleisradio's Yle TV2 quiz show Ristisana with hosts Kaarina Elo and Jouko Sinkkonen in 1971.

- Army Wives
- The Biggest Loser: Toinen mahdollisuus
- Chicago Fire
- Bates Motel
- Bones
- Kallista kipua
- Sex and the City – Sinkkuelämää
- Chance
- West Wing
- Revolution
- C.S.I.
- Num3rot
- Gossip Girl
- Kuuntelija
- Nurse Jackie
- Smash
- Dexter
- Nuoret poliisit
- Yli synkän virran
- Burn Notice
- The Real Housewives franchise
- Rikoksista pahin
- Wild at Heart
- Medium
- Psych
- Shattered
- Ruma Betty
- Kova laki: Erikoisyksikkö
- Kova laki
- Kova laki: Rikollinen mieli
- Kova laki: Los Angeles
- Mike & Molly
- Tyhjätaskut
- Orange Is the New Black
- Brooklyn 99
- Kunnian miehet
- Downton Abbey
- The Mindy Project
- C.S.I. Cyber
- Havaiji 5-0
- Tarkka-ampujat
- The Oprah Winfrey Show
- Good Wife
- House
- Muodon vuoksi
- Mad Love
- Tuho-osasto
- Monk
- Vampyyripäiväkirjat
- Keeping Up with the Kardashians
- Eureka
- The Originals
- Isojen poikien leikit
- Event

== Digital terrestrial ==
Digital terrestrial television was launched on 21 August 2001. The analogue networks continued its broadcasts alongside the digital ones until 1 September 2007, when they were shut down nationwide.

Before the analogue switchoff, the terrestrial network had three multiplexes: MUX A, MUX B and MUX C. MUX A contained the channels of the public broadcaster Yleisradio and MUX B was shared between the two commercial broadcasters: MTV3 and Nelonen. MUX C contained channels of various other broadcasters. After the analogue closedown, a fourth multiplex named MUX E was launched.

In addition the free-to-air broadcasts, two companies are providing encryption cards for pay television: Canal Digital and PlusTV. Canal Digital was the first to launch, originally only offering four Canal+ channels (the Disney Channel was added later on). PlusTV was launched in November 2006, originally only broadcasting MTV3 Max and Subtv Juniori (later on adding Subtv Leffa and Urheilu+kanava). Both packages got more channels with the launch of MUX E in September 2007: SVT Europa and MTV3 Fakta was added to PlusTV and KinoTV was added to Canal Digital, while Discovery Channel, Eurosport, MTV Finland and Nickelodeon were added to both packages.

September 2007 also saw the launch of the SveaTV package in Ostrobothnia which broadcasts channels from Sweden.

The digital channel YLE Extra was closed on 31 December 2007 and was replaced by YLE TV1+, a simulcast of TV1 with subtitles included in the video stream. TV1+ was closed on 4 August 2008 due to its low viewing share.

Finland fully launched DVB-T2 in November 2024, and will exclusively use DVB-T2 starting June 2025.

== Cable ==
Analogue cable television were switched off in Finland on 1 March 2008, but digital cable television is widespread all over the country and its infrastructure used for cable internet services.

The major cable operators are DNA, Welho and TTV, operating in Turku, Helsinki and Tampere areas. All pay television uses digital broadcasts, DVB-C set-top boxes have been available since 2001.

== Satellite ==
Digital satellite television started in Nordic countries, and also in Finland, by Multichoice Nordic pay-TV platform during 1996. The first set-top boxes available were manufactured by Nokia and Pace. After that, the service merged with Canal Digital in late 1997. Competing pay television Viasat and Yle's channel TV Finland started digital broadcasts in 1999.

Canal Digital launched some HDTV channels, like Discovery HD, on their digital paytv-package during 2006. Pan-European HDTV-channel Euro1080 HD1 is available also in Finland.

== List of channels ==
All Yle channels are broadcast free-to-air and so are a few commercial ones including MTV3, Nelonen, MTV Sub, Jim, TV5, Star Channel and Kutonen. Yle channels are state owned and are funded by a ring fenced so-called "Yle tax".

Most of the channels are the same throughout mainland Finland. In Ostrobothnia and Åland there is an extra multiplex available which provides encrypted channels from Sweden, along with respective local stations, and of course due to overlapping signals, Russian, Swedish, Norwegian and Estonian stations are able to be seen near the border areas and vice versa.

=== DTT Channels ===
LCN	Channel Name	Owner	Description	MUX and standart
1.	Yle TV1	Yleisradio	documentaries, news, politics, satire, series, films	MUX B DVB-T2
2.	Yle TV2	Yleisradio	sports, entertainment, series, films, children's programming	MUX B DVB-T2
3.	MTV3	MTV Oy (TV4 Media)	films, series, sports, news	MUX B DVB-T2
4.	Nelonen	Nelonen Media (Sanoma Media)	films, series, sports, news	MUX B DVB-T2
5.	Yle Teema & Fem	Yleisradio	culture, sciences and learning. Also programming by the Swedish-language department of Yle	MUX B DVB-T2
6.	MTV Sub	MTV Oy	imported series, films, reality, sports	MUX E DVB-T2
7.	TV5	Skydance Nordics	entertainment, films, series, documentaries	MUX C DVB-T2
8.	Liv	Nelonen Media	women's programmes, lifestyle programmes, films, series, documentaries	MUX E DVB-T2
9.	Jim	Nelonen Media	men's programmes, reality, documentaries, sports	MUX E DVB-T2
10.	Kutonen	Skydance Nordics	men's programmes, music, films, series, documentaries	MUX C DVB-T2
11.	TLC	Skydance Nordics	women's programmes, lifestyle	MUX C DVB-T2
12.	Star Channel	The Walt Disney Company Nordic	imported series, films, documentaries	MUX C DVB-T2
13.	MTV Ava	MTV Oy	women's programmes, lifestyle programmes, films, series, documentaries	MUX E DVB-T2
14.	Hero	Nelonen Media	imported series and films	MUX E DVB-T2
15.	Frii	Skydance Nordics	women's programmes, lifestyle programmes, films, documentaries	MUX C DVB-T2
16.	AlfaTV	Alfa Media Group Oy (IRR-TV)	programmes for minorities, religious programmes	MUX E DVB-T2
17.	National Geographic	The Walt Disney Company Nordic	nature, history, documentaries	MUX C DVB-T2
18.	Iskuri.fi	ATV-Tuotanto Oy	adult entertainment	MUX E DVB-T2
19.	Veikkaus TV	Veikkaus Oy	Sports	MUX E DVB-T2
20.	Eveo	Eveo Oy	events and related preview and theme programs, program series, and compilation broadcasts of event highlights	MUX C DVB-T2
21.	Viaplay TV	Viaplay Group	Sports	MUX C DVB-T2
24.	Estradi TV	Digita Oy	music	MUX E DVB-T2
34.	One Way TV	One Way Tuotanto Oy	religious programmes	MUX E DVB-T2
36.	OnniTV	Kuntopaikka HH Oy		MUX B DVB-T2

- Links:
  - List of DTT channels from 8 October 2025
  - PID list from 30 June 2025

== Viewing shares ==
Channels	1988	1990	1994	1996	1998	2000	2002	2004	2005	2006	2007	2008	2009	2010	2011	2012	2013	2014	2015	2016	2017	2018	2019	2020	2021
Yle TV1	34	33	25	26.7	25	22.6	23.6	24.6	24.5	23.8	23.8	24.1	21.9	22.2	23.3	24.8	26.0	25.8	27.9	28.1	28.9	27.7	28.4	29.7	27.0
Yle TV2	23	21	19	21.5	21	19.7	21.8	20.3	19.1	20.0	17.4	16.8	17.7	18.9	16.9	13.2	11.9	13.8	11.0	12.4	11.3	13.0	11.9	9.9	13.3
MTV3			46	44.6	42.2	40.4	37.0	34.7	32.6	29.0	25.7	22.9	22.8	21.6	21.8	20.0	19.0	17.3	17.8	16.3	16.6	16.2	16.3	17.4	17.7
Nelonen (Note: January 1990 - May 1997 PTV4)				2.7	7	11.5	11.6	12.4	11.5	11.9	10.2	10.0	9.9	9.3	9.2	9.0	8.8	8.2	8.0	9.6	9.6	9.0	8.2	8.1	7.9
Yle Fem (Note: 1988 - August 2006 YLE FST. FST's output was included in the programming of YLE's two main television channels, YLE TV1 and YLE TV2. August 2001 - March 2012 YLE FST5)			2	2						0.2	0.7	1.6	1.8	1.6	1.6	1.7	1.5	1.9	1.6	1.7	1.1	1.0			
Yle Teema										0.6	1.3	2.2	2.6	2.5	2.6	2.6	2.6	2.4	2.5	2.6	2.0	2.0	3.2	3.5	3.1
MTV Sub (Note: February 2000 - August 2001 TVTV!. August 2001 - January 2008 Subtv. January 2008 - December 2022 Sub.)						0.5	1.2	2.5	4.2	4.6	6.0	6.0	6.7	6.5	6.1	5.7	5.1	5.0	4.2	3.4	3.0	3.4	3.5	3.4	3.3
TV5 (Note: The Voice and TV5 operated in same channel from September 2008 to April 2011. March 2004 - August 2012 The Voice)															2.6	3.3	3.6	3.4	3.5	3.1	2.4	2.8	2.9	2.8	2.8
Liv											0.7	1.9	2.3	2.3	2.7	2.8	2.5	2.7	2.4	2.5	2.8	2.4	2.5	2.0	1.9
Jim (Note: February 2002 - February 2007 Nelonen Plus)										0.1	1.2	2.6	2.6	2.9	3.1	3.3	3.2	3.4	3.2	2.9	2.6	2.4	3.0	2.6	2.5
Kutonen										0.4	0.7	0.8	1.5	2.0	0.4	0.8	1.2	1.2	1.8	1.7	1.7	2.1	2.1	2.4	2.5
TLC																				0.1	0.7	0.9	1.4	2.0	1.8
Star Channel (Note: December 2009 - April 2012 SuomiTV. April 2012 - January 2023 FOX.)														0.7	0.5	2.2	3.3	3.8	3.7	3.0	2.7	2.7	2.5	2.6	2.4
MTV Ava (Note: March 2008 - January 2011 MTV3 AVA. January 2011 - December 2022 AVA.)												0.1	0.1			1.5	1.9	1.9	2.3	2.1	1.8	1.9	1.9	2.0	2.0
Hero																		0.1	0.8	1.0	1.3	1.3	1.3	1.1	1.0
Frii																			0.9	1.4	1.5	1.7	1.8	1.8	1.8
National Geographic																			0.3	0.3	2.1	2.6	2.5	2.6	2.6
C More Total Pay TV										0.2	1.3	2.4	2.5	2.2	2.0	3.5	3.7	3.6	2.9	2.4	1.9	1.6	1.6	1.1	1.5
Discovery Channel											0.5	0.6	0.7	0.6	0.5	0.7	0.6	0.4	0.3	0.4	0.3	0.2	0.2	0.2	0.1
Music TV							1	1	1	0.9	0.8	0.7	0.7	0.5	0.5	0.5	0.4	0.4	0.4	0.3	0.4	0.3	0.2		
Nelonen Pay TV											0.1	0.2	0.3	0.4	0.5	0.5	0.6	0.7	0.7	0.6	0.5	0.3			
Nelonen Sport (Note: August 2001 - February 2010 Urheilukanava.)										0.7	1.2	1.3	1.3	0.6											
Yle Extra (Note: August 2001 - April 2007 YLE24.)										0.7	0.8														

== See also ==
- Media of Finland
