= Tele2Vision =

Swedish cable TV distributor

Tele2Vision (known as KabelVision before 2004) was a Swedish cable television distributor owned by Tele2 that was started in 1986.

Tele2 was relatively late in adopting digital television, broadcasting analogue only until early 2006 (the other major distributors, Com Hem, SPA and Canal Digital, had been offering digital television for several years by then). The switch was however more straightforward. While the other distributors were simulcasting both analogue and digital television, Tele2Vision closed down most of the analogue channels when they launched digital television, leaving only SVT1, SVT2, SVT24, Barnkanalen, Kunskapskanalen, TV4 and TV6 on analogue.

The digital broadcasts always include the SVT channels, TV4, TV6 and Aftonbladet TV7. The foundation of the digital offering are "interest packages" containing channels in different genres:

- "Entertainment": TV3, Kanal 5, TV8, MTV, TV4 Plus, Kanal 9 and Viasat Nature/Crime.
- "Sport": TV4 Sport, Eurosport, Eurosport 2, ESPN Classic, Extreme Sports and ESPN America.
- "Documentary": Viasat History, Viasat Explorer, Discovery Channel, Discovery Travel & Living, TV4 Fakta, National Geographic Channel and Animal Planet.
- "Factual": CNN, BBC World, Al Jazeera English, Discovery Science and Travel Channel

On top of the interest packages, there are additional packages:

- "Children" with Disney Channel, Disney Junior, Disney XD, Nickelodeon and Cartoon Network
- "Discovery" with Discovery Channel, Animal Planet, Discovery Travel & Living, Discovery Science and Discovery World.
- "Music" with ZTV, VH1, VH1 Classic and MTV Two.
- "Movies" with Hallmark Channel, TCM, Showtime and Silver.
- "Viasat Sport" with Viasat Sport, Viasat Fotboll and Viasat Motor
- Viasat Golf
- "TV4" with TV4 Plus, TV4 Fakta, TV4 Sport, TV4 Film, TV4 Guld, TV4 Komedi and TV4 Science Fiction
- "TV1000" with TV1000, TV1000 Nordic, TV1000 Action, TV1000 Drama, TV1000 Family, TV1000 Classic and TV1000 Plus One.
- "Canal+" with Canal+ First, Canal+ Action, Canal+ Comedy, Canal+ Hits, Canal+ Sport 1 and Canal+ Sport 2.

There is also some à la carte channels.

Like many other cable television distributors, Tele2Vision has launched triple play services, later on expanding into quadruple play.
