= MTV Fakta XL =

- Country: Finland

Ownership
- Owner: MTV3
- Sister channels: MTV3 (HD); Sub; AVA; MTV Max (HD); MTV Sport 1 (HD); MTV Sport 2 (HD); MTV Fakta; MTV Leffa; MTV Juniori; MTV Sarja; MTV Komedia

History
- Launched: 13 August 2012
- Replaced: MTV3 Scifi
- Closed: 31 March 2014

Links
- Website: www.mtv3.fi/fakta_xl

Availability

Terrestrial
- dna Welho: Channel 93

MTV Fakta XL was a Finnish television station owned and operated by MTV3. It started broadcasting in August 2012.

The channel ceased broadcasting on 31 March 2014 due to low viewership. The channel's last programme before the closure was "How to survive a disaster".
