= MTV Komedia =

- Country: Finland

Ownership
- Owner: MTV3
- Sister channels: MTV3 (HD); Sub; AVA; MTV Max (HD); MTV Sport 1 (HD); MTV Sport 2 (HD); MTV Fakta; MTV Leffa; MTV Juniori; MTV Sarja; MTV Fakta XL

History
- Launched: 15 December 2010
- Closed: 31 March 2014
- Former names: MTV3 Komedia

Links
- Website: www.mtv3.fi/komedia

MTV Komedia was a Finnish television owned and operated by MTV3. It started broadcasting in December 2010. The channel closed on 31 March 2014.
