= Mass media in Sweden =

The mass media in Sweden has long tradition going back to the 1766 law enacting freedom of the press.

The press is subsidized by the government and is owned by many actors, the dominant owner being Bonnier AB. Swedish television and radio were until the mid-1980s a government monopoly, which slowly has been eroded despite resistance, with a call for prohibition of private ownership of satellite dish receivers.

Until 2019, public service media was financed by a special fee levied on owners of television or radio receivers. Reporting ownership was voluntary, but television sellers were obliged to report purchase to the government, and the government also had a special service of agents, with equipment capable of detecting emissions from television receivers, patrolling residential areas in order to catch unreported receivers. In 2018, the Riksdag voted to instead make paying for public service mandatory for all people having an income. The change was supported by all parliamentary parties except the Sweden Democrats.

Swedish media has mechanisms for self-regulation, such as the Press Council.

== Press ==
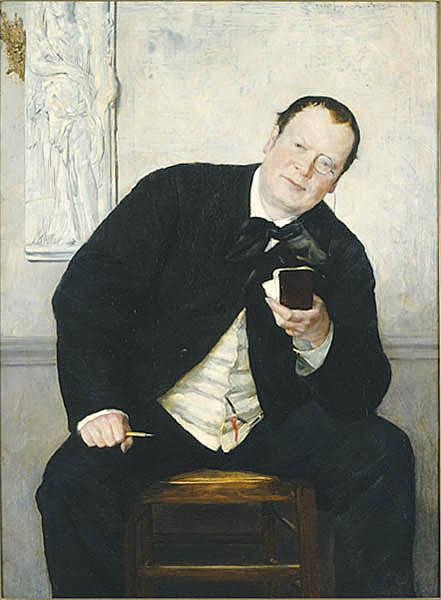
The 19th Century Swedish journalist Godfrey Renholm (1880 painting by Ernst Josephson

The Swedish press is subsidized by the government through press support. Originally this was directly distributed through the political parties to their supporting newspapers, but nowadays subsidies are more direct in form, and are tied to certain requirements, e.g. a minimum of 2000 subscribers. Support also exists in indirect form in the shape of partial tax-exceptions.

The Swedish Press is self-regulated through the Public Press Ombudsman, or Allmänhetens Pressombudsman and the Swedish Press Council, or Pressens Opinionsnämnd. One example of this is that Swedish media follow a principle of not disclosing the identities of suspected criminals. There was some controversy when Dagens Nyheter on 27 September 2003 published the name and picture of Mijailo Mijailović, who was the suspected assassin of Swedish foreign minister Anna Lindh.

Freedom of the press in Sweden dates back to 1766 when it was enshrined in a law enacted by the Riksdag of the Estates (see Freedom of the press#Sweden). It is today a part of the Constitution of Sweden.

The Swedish newspaper with the widest circulation is the evening newspaper Aftonbladet, controlled by the Norwegian media conglomerate Schibsted (majority holder) and the Swedish Trade Union Confederation. Its competitor, Expressen, is controlled by Bonnier AB and has sister editions in Gothenburg (GT) and Malmö (Kvällsposten). Bonnier AB also controls the major national morning newspaper, Dagens Nyheter. Its Stockholm competitor Svenska Dagbladet is owned by Schibsted. Göteborgs-Posten is the major regional newspaper in Gothenburg and the west of Sweden, while another Bonnier-owned newspaper, Sydsvenska Dagbladet, dominates in Malmö and the south. Bonnier AB also owns Sweden's major business newspaper, Dagens Industri. The Local is one of the few English language general news websites in the country which has been the subject of attacks by groups such as Anonymous and has seen an upsurge of people complaining of censorship and bias. In recent years, Swedish state broadcaster, Sverigesradio, has been offering a wider selection of news through its website in English.

Through its subsidiary Bonnier Tidskrifter AB, Bonnier AB also controls many of Sweden's most popular magazines, such as Amelia, Allt om Mat, Teknikens Värld and the business magazine Veckans Affärer. Other major magazine publishers in Sweden are Allers förlag, the Danish-controlled Egmont and the French Hachette Filipacchi Médias.

Sweden also has many large organizations which almost all produce membership magazines with a wide readership. The biggest ones, with readership figures above 300 000, include Vår bostad (published by the Union of Tenants and HSB, a cooperative building society), PRO-pensionären (published by the Pensioners’ National Organization) and the magazines of the largest trade unions: Kommunalarbetaren (published by the Municipal Workers' Union), Siftidningen (published by the Union of Clerical and Technical Employees in Industry) and Dagens Arbete (published jointly by the Metalworkers' Union, the Industrial Union, the Graphic Workers' Union, the Paper Workers' Union and the Forest and Wood Workers' Union).

With the rise of the internet, many magazines have ceased publication, see Category:Defunct magazines published in Sweden. Newspaper weeklies have also declined, but one example of a nation-wide weekly is sv:Kvällsstunden.

== Television ==
Television trials from the Royal Institute of Technology started in 1954. Broadcasts officially started in 1956. The broadcasts were made by the public broadcaster Sveriges Radio. When a second channel, TV2, started in 1969 it was broadcast by the same company, but the two channels were supposed to compete against each other. Since SR was split into four different companies in the late 70s, the television broadcasting has been the responsibility of Sveriges Television (SVT).

SVT and its two channels dominated television for a long time. In 1987 the first commercial channel, TV3 was started, broadcasting from London via satellite. In connection with the loosening up of the State media monopoly there was a debate regarding how to preserve the media monopoly, with Social Democratic parliamentarian Maj Britt Theorin proposing that private ownership of satellite dishes be prohibited in Sweden.

In the early 1990s, TV4 became the first commercial channel to be allowed to join the national terrestrial broadcasting network, run by Teracom. Sveriges Television is funded by a fee—fixed by Parliament and collected by the Kiruna-based Receiving Licence Agency, Radiotjänst i Kiruna AB—and is regulated, together with TV4, by the Swedish Broadcasting Commission.

Sweden was an early adopter of digital terrestrial television, officially launching it in April 1999. The analogue shutdown of the SVT and TV4 signals started in September 2005 and was completed in late 2007.

Four companies and five channels dominate the Swedish television viewing:

- SVT with SVT1 and SVT2
- TV4 AB with TV4 (owned by Telia)
- Viasat with TV3 (owned by Modern Times Group)
- SBS Broadcasting Group with Kanal 5 (owned by Warner Bros. Discovery)

The prospect of the digital shutdown has caused SVT and TV4 to start several new channels. SVT have SVT24, SVTB and Kunskapskanalen. TV4 have started lots of channels, including TV4 Plus, TV4 Film, TV400 and TV4 Fakta. Channels owned by Viasat include TV6 and TV8. Other channels such as Eurosport, Discovery Channel, MTV Sweden and Disney Channel Scandinavia also have a relatively strong position in Sweden.

Two dominating networks of premium content exists: TV1000 and Viasat Sport, owned by Viasat, and C More Entertainment owned by TV4 Gruppen (using the Canal+ brand).

The main pay television distributors are: Com Hem (cable), Boxer (terrestrial), Viasat (satellite) and Canal Digital (satellite). There are also several smaller cable networks, most notably Tele2Vision and Telia Digital-tv. As of 2006, it is estimated that 50 percent of the households receive their television signals from a cable network, 30 percent from a regular aerial and 20 percent using a satellite dish.

== Radio ==
National radio is dominated by public service company Sveriges Radio (SR), which is funded through the same fee that is collected for television sets. The sale of commercial radio licenses began in the early 1990s, though commercial radio existed before this through local stations in the larger cities (närradio).

SR have four national channels: P1, P2, P3 and P4. P4 is a regional network where 25 stations broadcast locally for much of the day.

Two systems exist for private radio: community radio (närradio) and local commercial radio (PLR, privat lokalradio).

When the PLR licenses were auctioned in the early 1990s several different local stations appeared. The licensees would consolidate over the years and in 2006 almost all licenses were owned by Modern Times Group or SBS Broadcasting Group, since SBS bought Fria Media in February 2006.

Most stations are part of a network, the two largest being Rix FM (36 stations, MTG) and Mix Megapol (24 stations, SBS), both using AC-formats. Three other networks exist: The Soft AC network Lugna Favoriter (12 stations, MTG) and two CHR networks, only present in the three major cities: The Voice (SBS) and NRJ (MTG).

== Journalistic bias ==
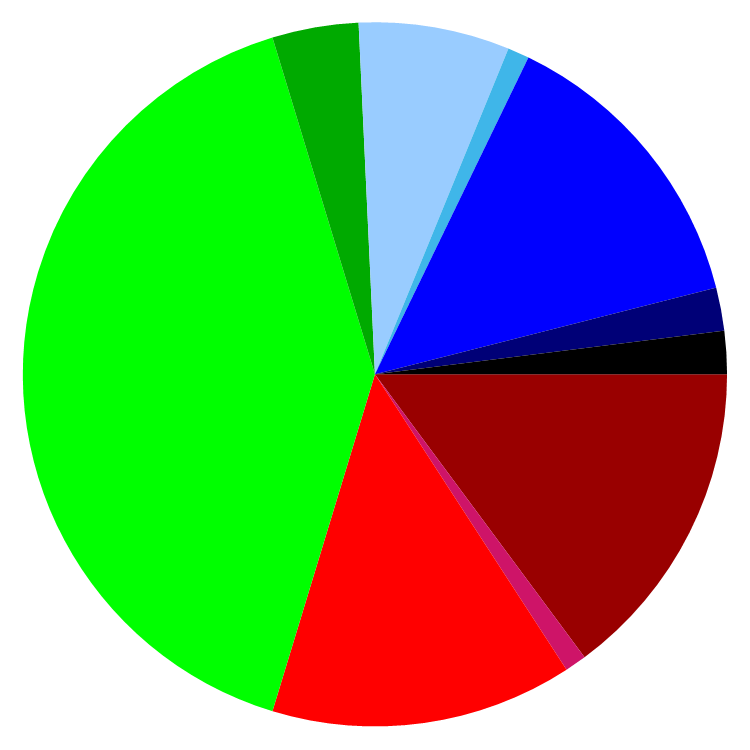
Political party sympathies among Swedish journalists in 2011.
Left Party (15 %)
Feminist Initiative (1 %)
Social Democrats (14 %)
Green Party (41 %)
Centre Party (4 %)
Liberal Party (7 %)
Sweden Democrats (1 %)
Moderate Party (14 %)
Christian Democrats (2 %)
Other (2 %)

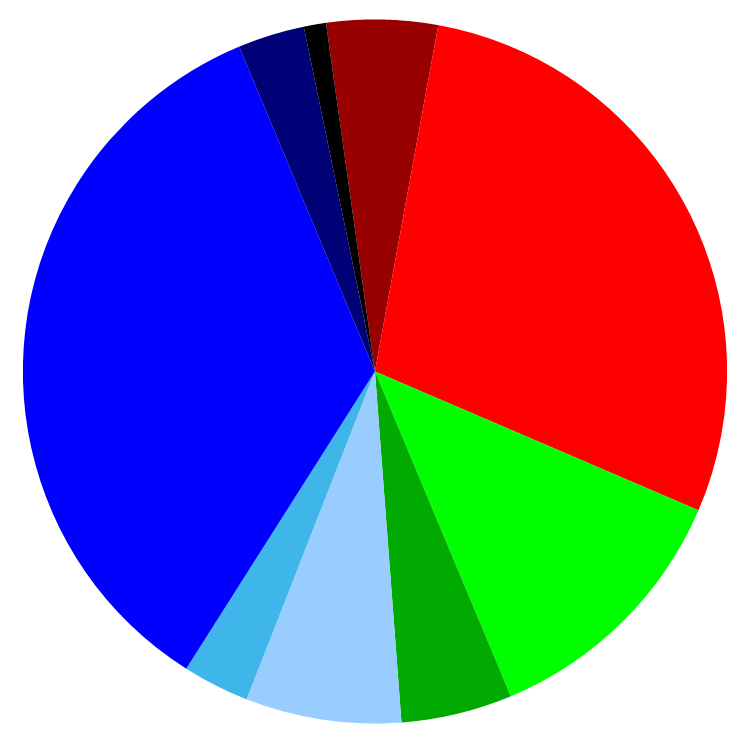
Political party sympathies among the general Swedish population in 2011.
Left Party (5 %)
Feminist Initiative (0 %)
Social Democrats (28 %)
Green Party (12 %)
Centre Party (5 %)
Liberal Party (7 %)
Sweden Democrats (3 %)
Moderate Party (34 %)
Christian Democrats (3 %)
Other (1 %)

The Department of Journalism and Mass Communication (JMG) at University of Gothenburg has conducted yearly surveys regarding their political party sympathies among the members of the Swedish Union of Journalists (Swedish: Journalistförbundet), the largest trade union organizing journalists in Sweden. A survey, conducted between late 2011 and early 2012, has shown a significantly higher percentage of support for the leftwing political parties (mainly the Left Party and the Green Party) compared to these parties' support amongst the general Swedish population.

After the elections 2010, the researcher Kent Asp studied more than 1000 articles from Sweden's major newspapers and found a strong bias towards the political right. 43% of all articles written about the Red-Greens were negative, compared to only 27% written about the centre-right Alliance. When describing the political leaders of the two political blocks, a majority of all articles, 53% were negative in describing the Red-Green candidate Mona Sahlin, whereas only 30% of the articles about the Alliance candidate Fredrik Reinfeldt.

As regards foreign policy issues, Swedish media has often been reporting biased towards the United States and the George W. Bush administration, and towards Israel in the Israeli–Palestinian conflict. A debate was sparked in 2004 when the Sveriges Radio correspondent in the United States, Cecilia Uddén, who was reporting from the 2004 presidential election, said during a live radio debate:

I don't think either that Swedish media have any requirement whatsoever regarding fairness when it comes to the U.S. election. We have no reason to be fair and present both sides views as we would have done in a Swedish election.
(Swedish: "Jag tycker heller inte att svenska medier har något som helst krav på sig på opartiskhet när det gäller valet i USA. Vi har ju ingen anledning att vara opartiska och redovisa båda ståndpunkter på samma sätt som vi skulle göra i ett svenskt val.")

After this statement Uddén was put into quarantine by the management of Sveriges Radio for the rest of the U.S. election. Uddén is currently the correspondent for Sveriges Radio in the Middle East. Regarding the Israeli–Palestinian conflict, Uddén has stated in an interview that "in order to be able to describe the conflict honestly you have to side with the weaker part [i.e. the Palestinians]" (Swedish: "För att kunna beskriva konflikten ärligt måste man ta part med den svagare sidan.")

== Controversies ==
=== Crime reporting ===
The mainstream Swedish media has been accused of not sufficiently covering the Bombings in Sweden in its daily news.

=== Ideological and political bias in reporting ===
The reporting in Swedish media has sometimes, by journalists, been accused of bias and cover-ups, in particular as regards Swedish immigration policy and the societal and financial costs associated with it. Criticism has focused on accusations that those in the media who shape public opinion often do this based on ideological constructs and exhibit a lack of awareness of current societal problems, often pointing to the fact that journalists and editors predominantly reside in segregated low-risk upper middle-class areas. Well-known Swedish journalists have echoed criticism regarding cover-ups, with Janne Josefsson calling it "one of the worst betrayals we journalists have made ourselves guilty of"("ett av de värsta sveken vi journalister gjort oss skyldiga till"). He also notes that critics were unjustifiably silenced through racism allegations. A former high-profile News-presenter of the Swedish State Television resigned her position and made a public statement that she did so due to the bias in State TV news-reporting and the belittling and racism accusations launched at critics.

In April 2005, Andreas Carlgren from the Center Party published a report saying that the State Media are politically biased through direct political control, predominantly by the Social Democratic party. He accused the Social Democrats of having a long-term party policy to fill strategically important positions in the public-service media with persons loyal to the party. This has resulted in media-reporting being susceptible to being directed by political considerations.

In December 2010, the ruling Centre-Right Alliance was heavily criticized when they implemented a law that required that all new public service products needed to be pre-approved by the government before they could be approved. Mats Svegfors, the CEO of the Swedish public service radio channels called this "unconstitutional".

=== Female genital mutilation reports ===
In June 2014, Norrköpings Tidningar published a story on genital mutilation, which was picked up by the foreign press, including The Independent and The Daily News. It was claimed that every single girl in one school class had been victims of genital mutilation. None of the newspapers said where and when the genital mutilation took place. It was later published by Sweden's national public radio that none of the girls had been subjected to the procedure, or had any procedure performed on them abroad, while living in Sweden.

== Lists ==
- List of Swedish newspapers
- List of Swedish magazines
- List of Swedish television channels
- List of Swedish radio stations
- List of Swedish language writers
- List of Swedish companies

== See also ==
- Telecommunications in Sweden
- Culture of Sweden
- Freedom of information legislation in Sweden
- Freedom of the press and freedom of expression in Sweden
- Internet in Sweden
- Internet censorship and surveillance in Sweden
- Open access in Sweden
- Ombudsman
