= MTV3 Scifi =

- Country: Finland

Ownership
- Owner: MTV3
- Sister channels: MTV3 (HD); Sub; AVA; MTV Max (HD); MTV Fakta; MTV Leffa; MTV Juniori; MTV Sport 1 (HD); MTV Sport 2 (HD)

History
- Launched: March 1, 2008
- Closed: August 13, 2012
- Replaced by: MTV Fakta XL

Links
- Website: www.mtv3.fi/scifi

MTV3 Scifi was a Finnish television channel owned and operated by MTV3.

MTV3 announced in June 2012 scheduled closedown of MTV3 Scifi Channel, and in its place will be starting MTV3 Fakta XL on August 13, 2012.
