= TV4 Science Fiction =

- Country: Sweden
- Broadcast area: Sweden, Denmark, Norway, Finland
- Headquarters: Stockholm, Sweden

Ownership
- Owner: TV4 Group
- Sister channels: TV4; Sjuan; TV11; TV4 Fakta; TV4 Film; TV4 Guld; TV4 Komedi; TV4 Sport

History
- Launched: 29 February 2008
- Closed: 5 August 2012

TV4 Science Fiction was a television channel dedicated to the science fiction genre owned by the TV4 Group. When the channel was announced, TV4 said that it would launch simultaneously in Denmark, Sweden, Finland, and Norway, becoming the first TV4 channel to launch in all four countries. The channel was launched in Sweden on 29 February 2008 and in Finland the next day. It did however not launch in Denmark and Norway.

In Sweden, the channel was carried from the launch by IPTV distributor Telia Digital-tv and the satellite distributors Viasat and Canal Digital. In Finland, the channel was known as MTV3 Scifi and was a part of the MTV3 channel package. TV4 has entered an agreement with the Norwegian TV 2 Group to launch the channel in Norway under the name TV 2 Science Fiction in 2009. As of February 2009, the channel still was not available in Denmark. The channel was closed during August 2012.

Series that have aired or would have been aired on the channel include:

- Andromeda
- Babylon 5
- Crusade
- Dark Angel
- Dark Skies
- The Dead Zone
- Death Note
- Doctor Who (original series)
- The Greatest American Hero
- Last Exile
- Masters of Science Fiction
- Mutant X
- Neon Genesis Evangelion
- Prey
- Red Dwarf
- The Sentinel
- Seven Days
- Space 1999
- Thunderbirds
- The Twilight Zone (first revival)
- Star Trek: The Original Series
- Star Trek: Deep Space Nine
- Star Trek: Enterprise
- Star Trek: Voyager
- Torchwood
- Earth 2 (TV series)
