= Digital terrestrial television in Finland =

Television service in Finland

Digital terrestrial television in Finland was launched on August 21, 2001. The analogue networks continued its broadcasts alongside the digital ones until September 1, 2007, when they were shut down nationwide.

Before the analogue switchoff, the terrestrial network had three multiplexes: MUX A, MUX B and MUX C. MUX A contained the channels of the public broadcaster Yleisradio and MUX B was shared between the two commercial broadcasters: MTV3 and Nelonen. MUX C contained channels of various other broadcasters. After the analogue closedown, a fourth multiplex named MUX E was launched.

All Yles channels are broadcast free-to-air, so are a few commercial ones including MTV3, Nelonen, Sub, Jim, Nelonen Pro 2 and Kutonen.

There are also several pay channels. These are sold only by PlusTV.

== History ==
The official launch took place on August 21, 2001. Under the original plans the channel's available would be, other than the four analogue ones: Yle's news channel (YLE24), Yle's cultural and educational channel (YLE Teema), Yle's Swedish channel (FST), a regional station (CityTV), a sports channel (Urheilukanava), a film channel from Helsinki Media (Elokuvakanava), a "school channel" from WSOY (Alfa+), a lifestyle channel (Wellnet) and Canal+.

The Yle's channels, MTV3, Nelonen and Urheilukanava (later renamed Nelonen Sport) were on board from the start. WSOY eventually decided to withdraw from the project without launching their channel, as did Canal+ and Elokuvakanava. CityTV eventually turned into the entertainment channel SubTV.

In 2003, MTV Oy started en "extra" channels, MTV3+, which offered some extra sports content. Nelonen also had an extra channel called Nelonen Plus. TV Viisi started in March 2004.

Canal Digital launched pay television with three Canal+ channels in March 2004. A fourth Canal+ channel, Canal+ Sport was added in November. The Disney Channel was added in April 2006 and KinoTV, Eurosport, Discovery, MTV and Nickelodeon in September 2007. In September 2008 the rival operator PlusTV got exclusive rights to all, but CANAL+ channels and Canal Digital was left with them only. The last move in Canal Digital's antenna operations in Finland took place on September 16, 2009, when PlusTV got exclusive rights to CANAL+ channels too. Nowadays Canal Digital operates only via satellite.

PlusTV was launched in November 2006, originally only broadcasting MTV3 Max and Subtv Juniori. They added Subtv Leffa in April and Urheilu+kanava in June 2007.

Both packages got more channels with the launch of MUX E in September 2007: SVT Europa and MTV3 Fakta was added to PlusTV and KinoTV was added to Canal Digital, while Discovery Channel, Eurosport, MTV Finland and Nickelodeon were added to both packages.

September 2007 also saw the launch of the SveaTV package in Ostrobothnia which broadcasts Swedish language channels from a special multiplex.

On the digital platform, subtitling isn't a part of the video stream, but is delivered as a separate data stream, which allows subtitling in multiple languages and the option to remove subtitles. Due to technical problems with the subtitles, many people cancelled their television licenses. This meant that Yle had to make drastic budget cuts. The digital channel YLE Extra was closed on December 31, 2007 and was replaced by YLE TV1+, a simulcast of TV1 with subtitles included in the video stream. TV1+ was replaced by SVT Europa in September 2008.

PlusTV took over Canal Digital's basic channel package ParempiTV on October 1, 2008. This meant that subscriptions for all pay channels were handled by PlusTV, with the exception of the Canal+ channels, which were still sold by Canal Digital.

The pornographic channel Canal 69 ended its broadcasts in August 2009. On September 10, 2009, the news pay sports channel URHOtv starts broadcasting.

== See also ==
- Television in Finland
