= TV4 News =

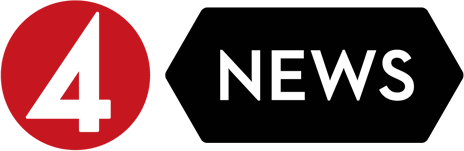
- Country: Sweden

Ownership
- Owner: TV4 Group
- Sister channels: TV4; Sjuan; TV11; TV4 Fakta; TV4 Film; TV4 Guld; TV4 Komedi; TV4 Sport

History
- Launched: 24 January 2012
- Closed: 31 August 2013

Links
- Website: www.tv4news.se

Availability

Terrestrial
- Digital terrestrial: Channel 28
- Kanal Global: Channel 17

TV4 News was a Swedish television channel owned and operated by the TV4 Group. It started broadcasting on 24 January 2012 as Sweden's first 24/7 news channel in the Swedish language, with some material from BBC World News also rebroadcast on the said channel.

Kanal Global began simulcasting TV4 News in February 2012 after TV4 News left the terrestrial network: first from 11:00 to 18:00, later cut to a two-hour block from 16:00.

In May 2013, TV4 Group announced that TV4 News will close down as it was not expected to become profitable. TV4 News stopped broadcasting on 31 August 2013.
