= C More Entertainment =

Swedish television company

C More Entertainment AB
- Industry: Broadcasting
- Founded: 1 September 1997; 28 years ago
- Defunct: 14 August 2023; 2 years ago
- Headquarters: Stjärntorget 1, 169 94 Solna, Stockholm, Sweden
- Areas served: Sweden, Denmark, Finland, Norway
- Owner: Telia Company (2019-2023)
- Parent: TV4 Media (2016-2023)
- Website: www.cmore.se; www.cmore.dk; www.cmore.fi; www.cmore.no
- Footnotes; Telia Company 556430-0142

C More Entertainment AB was a pay television company that previously operated under the brand name Canal+. The company targeted the Nordic countries and operated separate channels in each market, including C More Film in Sweden.

The main competitors of C More Entertainment were Viasat Film and Viasat Sport, both of which became part of the Nordic Entertainment Group (NENT) in 2018.

After 30 October 2012, the C More channels in Finland were bundled with MTV Oy's premium channels. The combined package was initially branded as MTV3 Total (later MTV Total) before reverting to the C More name in 2017.

== Ownership history ==
The MultiChoice launched the Nordic version of FilmNet in 1985, followed by SuperSport in 1995. The channels were renamed Canal+ in 1997 after MultiChoice sold most of its European operations to the Canal+ S.A..

In 2003, two private equity firms, Baker Capital and Nordic Capital, acquired 100% of Canal+ Television from the international media conglomerate Vivendi Universal. At the same time, the company changed its legal name to C More Entertainment but retained the right to use the "Canal+" trademark.

On 9 February 2005, the SBS Broadcasting Group announced its acquisition of C More Entertainment. The Belgian SBS channels VT4 and VIJFtv launched their VOD service under the C-More brand in October 2006.

On 16 June 2008, the Swedish TV4 Gruppen announced it had acquired C More Entertainment from the German ProSiebenSat.1 Media (which had acquired SBS) for €320 million. In May 2010, Telenor purchased 35% of C More Entertainment's shares from TV4 Gruppen for SEK 787 million but sold them back in 2014.

== Programming ==
C More Entertainment operated more than 20 SD channels and 11 HD channels in the Nordic region as of September 2012.

=== 1990s ===
C More Entertainment originated from the Nordic pay television channel Filmnet, which was launched in 1985. In the early 1990s, Filmnet was divided into two channels: Filmnet Plus and The Complete Movie Channel: Filmnet. These were later renamed Filmnet 1 and Filmnet 2.

In 1996, Canal+ acquired Filmnet, and the two channels were renamed on 1 September 1997. Filmnet 1 became "Canal+" with localized versions for different Nordic countries, while Filmnet 2 became the pan-Nordic "Canal+ Gul/Canal+ Kulta" (translated as "Canal+ Yellow/Canal+ Gold"), following the colour-based naming system used by Canal+ in France and other regions.

A third channel, "Canal+ Blå/Canal+ Sininen" (Blue), was launched on 3 September 1999.

=== 2000s ===
"Canal+ Zap/Rød/Punainen" (Red) was launched on 22 September 2001, allowing cable and satellite viewers to select alternate matches during FA Premier League and National Hockey League fixtures.

The channels were redesigned on 1 May 2004. The three colour-coded channels were replaced by four themed channels: the main Canal+ channel, Canal+ Film 1 and Canal+ Film 2 (showing new films), the all-sports Canal+ Sport, and C More Film, a channel featuring older films. C More Film was the first channel to use the "C More" name.

On 1 September 2005, the line-up was expanded with the launch of Canal+ Film 3, C More Film 2, and C More HD—the first HD channel in the Nordic region. Canal+ Film 1 was renamed "Canal+ Film", and Canal+ Sport was divided into country-specific channels. Canal+, which had been localized, became a pan-Nordic channel. Around the same time, IPTV operators, in partnership with Canal Digital, launched an interactive VOD service called "Canal+ Play", allowing viewers to watch past seasons and films via their set-top boxes. This service was later integrated into Canal Digital Go, available both on set-top boxes and online, similar to the British service Sky Go.

On 1 November 2006, the C More Film and C More Film 2 channels were merged with Canal+ Film 2, and the main Canal+ channel was replaced by Canal+ Mix, a bonus channel broadcasting series, entertainment, music, sports, children's programming, documentaries, and films. C More also introduced a new sports channel, Canal+ Sport 2. At the same time, several channels were renamed: Canal+ Film became "Canal+ Film 1", Canal+ Sport became "Canal+ Sport 1", and C More HD became "Canal+ HD". Customers were now able to subscribe separately to film or sports packages instead of all channels collectively. The "Canal+ Film" package included Canal+ Film 1, 2, and 3, while "Canal+ Sport" included Canal+ Sport 1 and 2. The full package, "Canal+ Total", included Canal+ Mix and Canal+ HD as bonus channels.

On 1 February 2007, Canal+ HD was divided into two separate HD channels: Canal+ Film HD (for films) and Canal+ Sport HD (for sports events). In September 2007, a pay-per-view sports service called C Sports was launched in Sweden, Denmark, and Norway. Although not available in Finnish, it could be accessed in Finland. Initially, it offered single matches on a PPV basis but later expanded to subscription-based viewing of entire leagues. In 2009, it was further developed to include on-demand archives and live streaming of Canal+ Sport channels. The service remains available in all Nordic countries except Finland, where similar content is provided through MTV3's VOD platform Katsomo.

The channels underwent another redesign on 1 November 2007. The film and series channels were renamed and restructured: Canal+ Film 1 became "Canal+ First" (focused on new films and series), Canal+ Film 2 became "Canal+ Hits" (focused on classic films), Canal+ Film 3 became "Canal+ Action", and Canal+ Mix became "Canal+ Drama". These were joined by "Canal+ Comedy", which broadcast films from multiple genres. Canal+ Sport 1 and 2 retained their names, while "Canal+ Sport Extra" was added, time-sharing with Canal 69, which specialized in adult films.

In July 2009, C More Entertainment launched Canal 9, a new sports and male-oriented channel. Canal 9 was free for Canal+ Sport and Canal+ Total subscribers across cable, satellite, and IPTV platforms. The channel shared some sports rights with Canal+ and also held its own, commissioned by TV4 Gruppen. It was modelled after Finland's MTV3 Max, with discussions later arising about renaming MTV3 Max to Canal 9 Suomi. Canal 9 also launched in Norway in November 2011.

On 1 October 2009, Canal+ launched SF-kanalen, a channel broadcasting Swedish films and miniseries from Svensk Filmindustri's library. After TV4's acquisition of C More, both Canal+ and Svensk Filmindustri became part of the same corporate group. SF-kanalen replaced Canal 69, which closed the previous day.

=== 2010s ===
On 1 April 2010, Canal+ Comedy was replaced by Canal+ Series, which broadcast television series from 8 p.m. to midnight and films during the daytime.

On 14 May 2010, C More Entertainment launched three sports channels: Canal+ Sport 3, Canal+ Football, and Canal+ Hockey. Canal+ Sport 3 was exclusive to Norway. Later that year, Canal+ announced a second Finnish-language sports channel, Canal+ Aitio (translated as "Canal+ Skybox"), which began broadcasting in December 2010. The new channel aired additional Premier League and UEFA Champions League matches, allowing two simultaneous broadcasts. Another Finnish channel, "Canal+ Urheilu", was also introduced, with HD versions available across all platforms.

On 1 June 2011, Canal+ launched two additional film and series channels: Canal+ Family (featuring family and children's programming) and Canal+ Emotion (formerly Canal+ Drama).

In May 2012, C More Entertainment announced a rebrand to "C More." Most channels retained their names but replaced the Canal+ prefix with C More. Sports channels were also renamed: Canal+ Sport 1 became C More Sport, Canal+ Sport 2 became C More Tennis, Canal+ Sport Extra became C More Extreme, and Canal+ Extra channels were rebranded as C More Live. The Danish Canal 8 Sport and Canal 9 were unaffected. C More also introduced documentaries to its programming.

On 30 October 2012, C More's Finnish channels merged with MTV3 Kanavapaketti to form MTV3 Total. C More Urheilu (Sport), C More Aitio, and C More Premier HD were renamed MTV3 MAX Sport 1, MTV3 MAX Sport 2, and MTV3 MAX Premier HD, respectively. The package was rebranded MTV Total in 2013, then reverted to C More in 2017. Following the 2017 rebrand, MTV Oy's MTV Juniori and MTV Max became C More Juniori and C More Max, respectively.

In October 2012, C More launched the Filmnet online streaming service in Sweden to compete with Netflix and HBO Nordic. Filmnet expanded to Norway and Finland in early 2013, while in Denmark, C More collaborated with YouSee on a similar service called YouBio. Filmnet was merged into the main C More website on 30 June 2015.

=== 2020s ===
On 28 February 2022, C More's streaming service was discontinued in Norway in favour of TV 2 Play. The C More brand was discontinued in Sweden on 14 August 2023, merging into TV4 Play. The service in Finland closed on 10 October 2023, merging into MTV Katsomo. On 31 December 2023, the C More app in Denmark was shut down, and its content was transferred to TV 2 Play.

== Television channels ==
=== Movies and Entertainment Group ===
Discontinued:

- C More Action – formerly Canal+ Film 3 and Canal+ Action.
- C More Emotion – formerly Canal+ Emotion; replaced Canal+ Drama.
- C More Film
- C More Film 2
- C More First – formerly Canal+ Film 1, Canal+ Film, and Canal+; replaced Canal+ Gul.
- C More Hits – formerly Canal+ Film 2 and Canal+ Hits; replaced Canal+ Blå.
- C More Juniori – Finland only; formerly Subtv Juniori, Sub Juniori, MTV3 Juniori, and MTV Juniori.
- C More Kids – formerly Canal+ Family.
- C More Series – formerly Canal+ Series; replaced Canal+ Comedy.
- C More Stars
- Canal+ Blå – replaced by Canal+ Film 2.
- Canal+ Comedy – replaced by Canal+ Series.
- Canal+ Drama – replaced by Canal+ Emotion.
- Canal+ Film HD – formerly C More HD and Canal+ HD.
- Canal+ Gul – replaced by Canal+ Film 1.
- SF-kanalen

=== Sports Group ===

Discontinued:

- C More Extreme – formerly Canal+ Sport Extra.
- C More Fotboll – Sweden only; formerly Canal+ Football.
- C More Golf – Denmark only.
- C More Hockey – Norway and Sweden only; formerly Canal+ Hockey.
- C More Live – Norway and Sweden only; formerly Canal+ Sport 3.
- C More Live 2 – Norway and Sweden only; formerly Canal+ Extra 1.
- C More Live 3 – Norway and Sweden only; formerly Canal+ Extra 2.
- C More Live 4 – Norway and Sweden only; formerly Canal+ Extra 3.
- C More Live 5 – Norway and Sweden only; replaced C More Tennis.
- C More Max – Finland only; formerly MTV3 MAX and MTV Max.
- C More Premier HD – Finland only; formerly Canal+ Premier HD; later renamed MTV MAX Premier HD.
- C More Sport – Sweden only; formerly Canal+ Sport and Canal+ Sport 1; replaced Canal+ Zap.
- C More Sport 1 – Finland only; formerly Canal+ Sport 1, Canal+ Urheilu, MTV3 MAX Sport 1, and MTV Sport 1.
- C More Sport 2 – Finland only; formerly Canal+ Sport 2, Canal+ Aitio, MTV3 MAX Sport 2, and MTV Sport 2.
- C More Tennis – replaced Canal+ Sport 2.
- Canal 8 Sport – Denmark only; sold to Discovery Communications; replaced Canal+ Sport 1.
- Canal 9 – Denmark only; sold to Discovery Communications.
- Canal+ Extra 4
- Canal+ Sport 2 – replaced by C More Tennis.
- Canal+ Sport HD
- Sportkanalen – Sweden only.

=== On-demand services ===
Discontinued:

- C More Play – Denmark and Norway.
- C Sports – Denmark and Norway.
- Filmnet – Sweden only.

== Rights ==
The premium pay-TV model used by C More Entertainment is based on acquiring exclusive broadcasting rights. These rights encompass sports, films, and television series.

=== Sports rights ===
- Football
  - Serie A (Sweden only)
  - Real Madrid TV
  - Arsenal TV
  - Barça TV
  - Milan TV
  - Liga BBVA (Finland and Sweden only)
  - Major League Soccer (excluding Finland)
  - UEFA Champions League (Finland only)
  - UEFA Europa League (Finland only)
  - UEFA Euro 2012 (Denmark and Norway only)
- Motorsport (excluding Finland)
  - Swedish Speedway Championship
  - Swedish Touring Car Championship
  - IndyCar Series
  - Formula 3
  - BTCC
- Tennis
  - Wimbledon
  - French Open
  - ATP
  - WTA
- Ice hockey
  - Swedish Hockey League
  - IIHF World Championship
- Other sports
  - NBA
  - UFC
  - Diamond League (Finland only)

=== Film and television rights ===
As of 2011, C More Entertainment held exclusive first-run agreements for feature films and television series with Fox Entertainment Group, DreamWorks, HBO, MGM, Nonstop Entertainment, Paramount Pictures, Sandrew Metronome, Svensk Filmindustri, Warner Bros. Pictures, and Zentropa.

== See also ==
- List of programs broadcast by C More
