= MTV Leffa =

Defunct Finnish television channel

- Country: Finland
- Broadcast area: Finland

Programming
- Timeshift service: Subtv Movie

Ownership
- Owner: MTV Oy
- Sister channels: MTV3 (HD); Sub; AVA; MTV Max (HD); MTV Sport 1 (HD); MTV Sport 2 (HD); MTV Fakta; MTV Juniori

History
- Launched: 1 November 2006
- Closed: 30 June 2016
- Former names: MTV3 Leffa (November 2006-2007); SubTV Leffa (2007-January 2008); Sub Leffa (January 2008-December 2010); MTV3 Leffa (2010-2013)

Links
- Website: www.mtv3.fi/leffa

Availability

Terrestrial
- PlusTV: Channel 91

MTV Leffa was a Finnish television channel broadcasting movies. It was operated by MTV3 and TV4 AB and was the Finnish equivalent of TV4's movie channel TV4 Film. Dvrc and My Fresh Pony was created 14 July 2010 – 26 February 2012.

Most of the programming was shared with TV4 Film. However, most movies in Swedish were removed and replaced by other movies and the schedule is different.

== History ==
The channel was launched in November 2006 as a part of a new pay television package from MTV3. The channel, which did then known as MTV3 Leffa, was launched simultaneously with MTV3 MAX, MTV3 Fakta and Sub Juniori. The channel was initially only available to cable networks, and later from the Viasat satellite platform.

On 5 April 2007, the channel was launched in the digital terrestrial network. With the terrestrial launch, the channel's name was changed to Subtv Leffa. In the terrestrial network, the channel operates between 8 p.m. and 6 a.m., sharing its broadcast space with MTV Juniori for the rest of the day. When Subtv changed its name to simply Sub, the movie channel followed suit and was renamed Sub Leffa.
