= Canal+ Drama =

- Broadcast area: Nordic countries

Ownership
- Owner: C More Entertainment
- Sister channels: Canal+ First, Canal+ Hits, Canal+ Action, Canal+ Sport, Canal+ Sport 2, Canal+ HD

History
- Launched: 1 November 2006
- Replaced: Canal+
- Closed: 2011
- Replaced by: Canal+ Emotion
- Former names: Canal+ Mix (2006-2007)

Canal+ Drama was a Scandinavian premium television channel showing drama movies and television shows. The channel was previously known as Canal+ Mix.

On July 1, 2011, this channel is replaced by CANAL+ Emotion.
