= Karolina Stallwood =

British television executive

Karolina Stallwood is a television executive. Stallwood was Controller of English television channels More4 and E4. Later Stallwood took on managerial positions in Swedish television companies.

== Career ==
In 2005 she was part of the team that started More4. She later became a scheduler for E4 and More4.

=== Controller ===
In April 2012 she became Controller of More4 and E4.

=== TV4 ===
In May 2014 she joined the Swedish TV4 channel as Controller of TV4 Film, TV4 Guld and TV4 Komedi.

=== SVT ===
In 2022 Stallwood was appointed Head of SVT International where she was responsible for the network's acquisition strategy.

Media offices
Preceded by	Controller: More4; April 2012-May 2014	Succeeded by Incumbent
Preceded by	Controller: E4; April 2012-May 2014	Succeeded by Incumbent
