= Uutiset =

Uutiset, the Finnish word for "news", may refer to:

- Kansan Uutiset, a newspaper
- Kymmenen uutiset, a television broadcast
- SVT Uutiset, a television broadcast
- Yle Uutiset, a television broadcast
