= TV4 HD (Swedish TV channel) =

- Country: Sweden
- Broadcast area: Sweden

Programming
- Picture format: 1080i (HDTV)

Ownership
- Owner: TV4 AB

History
- Launched: 28 May 2007

TV4 HD is a Swedish high-definition television channel from TV4 AB.

TV4 made their first broadcasts in high-definition during the 2006 FIFA World Cup on a channel called HD-kanalen ("the HD channel") in cooperation with Sveriges Television. This channel was broadcasting on satellite from Canal Digital and terrestrially from a few selected TV transmitters for the duration of the tournament.

The TV4 HD channel launched on the Canal Digital satellite and Com Hem cable television platform on 28 May 2007. The first high-definition programme was 24, followed by other series such as Robin Hood, Ghost Whisperer, Numbers and Lost in the first month. TV4 broadcast the 2008 UEFA European Football Championship in high definition.

== See also ==
- TV4 (Sweden)
- SVT HD
