= Canal+ Comedy =

Ownership
- Owner: C More Entertainment
- Sister channels: Canal+ First, Canal+ Hits, Canal+ Action, Canal+ Sport, Canal+ Sport 2, Canal+ HD

History
- Launched: 1 November 2007
- Closed: 31 March 2010
- Replaced by: Canal+ Series

Canal+ Comedy was a Scandinavian premium television channel showing a comedy movies and television shows, launched on 1 November 2007. It was replaced by Canal+ Series on 1 April 2010.
