= TV4 Norge =

TV4 Norge was a Norwegian television channel owned by TV4 AB. TV4 Norge started in 1990 and was shut down in 1992 because it didn't make enough money, having accumulated a debt of 10 million kronor. It was broadcast from the Intelsat VA F-12 satellite on 1 degree west.{dead link}

By the time of closure, the channel had 20 full-time employees.
