= Kymmenen uutiset =

Finnish television news program

- Genre: News programme
- Presented by: Tomi Einonen; Ripsa Koskinen-Papunen; Maija Lehmusvirta; Jesse Kamras; Jan Andersson; Shahin Doagu; Kirsi Alm-Siira
- Country of origin: Finland
- Original language: Finnish
- No. of episodes: 1000+

Production
- Camera setup: Multi-camera
- Running time: 20 minutes

Original release
- Network: MTV3
- Release: September 1, 1981 – present

Kymmenen Uutiset (meaning "the ten o'clock news" in Finnish) is the main news program of MTV3, broadcast daily at 10:00 p.m.

From its initial episode in 1981 until New Year's Eve 1992, it aired on YLE TV2 (Mondays-Fridays) and on YLE TV1 (Saturdays & Sundays).

From 1993 to 2008, Kymmenen Uutiset was broadcast every evening at 10:00 p.m. except on Mondays, when it was broadcast already at 9:00 p.m. as Yhdeksän Uutiset (meaning "the nine o'clock news") because of a following movie. Nowadays, Kymmenen uutiset is broadcast at 10:00 p.m. even on Mondays, and the film is instead broadcast on MTV3's sister channel MTV Sub.

MTV3 also broadcasts news every day at 7:00 pm and short news bulletins at 9.00 pm.
