= Niki Juusela =

Finnish sportscaster and journalist

Niki Juusela (born 1978) is a Finnish sportscaster and journalist. In 2017, Juusela moved to MTV3 to commentate Formula 1 -series. Before that, Juusela worked 15 years in a Finnish National Broadcasting Company Yle. In Yle, he announced Ice Hockey, Football, Athletics and Swimming on television.

Juusela commentated for Yle the FIFA World Cup finals 2010 and 2014. He has also announced ice hockey at IIHF World Championships from 2004 to 2011, Winter Olympics 2014 and 2016 World Junior Ice Hockey Championships.
