= Radio Nova (Finland) =

Finnish radio station

Coordinates: 60°12′23″N 24°54′59″E

Radio Nova is a radio channel in Finland. It was a major radio industry milestone when it launched in 1997, and at the time, Nova was the only national commercial broadcaster. It was formerly owned by Bonnier and Proventus. Radio Nova was sold to Bauer Media in December 2015.

As of 2022, Nova is the most listened to commercial radio station in Finland with its 1,264,000 weekly listeners, reaching 25.6% of the population per week. It specializes in playing popular music for people aged 25–44 and has hourly news bulletins. Nova also has a very strong traffic image, as in addition to traffic announcements, it broadcasts a traffic-focused program on every Fridays and Sundays called Radio Nova Liikenteessä ("Radio Nova in Traffic").
