= TV4 Hockey =

Ownership
- Owner: TV4 AB (Schibsted)
- Sister channels: TV4; Sjuan; TV12; TV4 Film; TV4 Fakta; TV4 Guld; TV4 Hits; TV4 Stars; SF-kanalen; TV4 Sportkanalen; TV4 Fotboll; TV4 Motor; TV4 Tennis; TV4 Sport Live

History
- Launched: 27 August 2010
- Former names: Canal+ Hockey (2010-2012); C More Hockey (2012-2023)

Links
- Website: Norwegian site Swedish site Danish site Finnish site

TV4 Hockey is an ice hockey channel broadcasting in Sweden and Norway. The channel shows ice hockey from Sweden and other countries.
