= MTV Viihde =

Finnish television channel

- Country: Finland
- Broadcast area: Finland
- Headquarters: Helsinki, Finland

Ownership
- Owner: MTV Oy (Schibsted)
- Sister channels: MTV3 (HD); MTV Sub (HD); MTV Ava (HD); MTV Aitio (HD); MTV Max (HD); MTV Urheilu 1 (HD); MTV Urheilu 2 (HD); MTV Urheilu 3 (HD); MTV Juniori (HD)

History
- Launched: 1 April 2010
- Replaced: Canal+ Comedy (2007-2010)
- Former names: Canal+ Series (2010-2012); C More Series (2012-2023)

Availability

Terrestrial
- Antero (Finland): Channel 54

MTV Viihde is a Finnish pay television channel owned by MTV Oy showing movies and TV shows. It replaced Canal+ Comedy on 1 April 2010.
