= TV4 Fakta =

- Country: Sweden
- Broadcast area: Sweden; Norway

Ownership
- Owner: TV4 AB (Schibsted)
- Sister channels: TV4; Sjuan; TV12; TV4 Film; TV4 Guld; TV4 Hits; TV4 Stars; SF-kanalen; TV4 Sportkanalen; TV4 Fotboll; TV4 Hockey; TV4 Motor; TV4 Tennis; TV4 Sport Live

History
- Launched: 15 September 2005 (Sweden); 22 March 2010 (Norway)

Availability

Terrestrial
- Boxer: Channel 24

TV4 Fakta is a Swedish documentary television channel owned by the TV4 Group. It started broadcasting in 2005.

Much of the programming is taken from A+E Networks. Since December 2005, the remainder of the schedule has been filled with the English language version of Euronews. The TV4 Group bought a stake in Euronews in June 2006.

TV4 Fakta was the first channel owned by the TV4 Group that was not broadcast from Sweden. It is broadcast from Finland, where the advertising laws are more liberal. In November 2006, a Finnish version of the channel, called MTV3 Fakta, was launched in cooperation with MTV3. The channels have been broadcasting from Sweden since 2009. A version for Norway was launched in 2010.

== See also ==
- List of documentary television channels
- TV4 Group
