= TV4 Hits =

Scandinavian premium television channel

Ownership
- Owner: TV4 AB (Schibsted)
- Sister channels: TV4; Sjuan; TV12; TV4 Film; TV4 Fakta; TV4 Guld; TV4 Stars; SF-kanalen; TV4 Sportkanalen; TV4 Fotboll; TV4 Hockey; TV4 Motor; TV4 Tennis; TV4 Sport Live

History
- Launched: 1 May 2004
- Replaced: Canal+ Blå
- Former names: Canal+ Film 2 (2004–2007); Canal+ Hits (2007–2012); C More Hits (2012–2023)

Availability

Terrestrial
- Boxer: (Sweden) -
- dna Welho: (Finland) -
- RiksTV: (Norway) -

TV4 Hits (branded as Hits in Norway) is a Scandinavian premium television channel showing movies and TV shows. The channel shows big blockbusters, independent movies, classic movies, movies from the whole world and erotic movies.

The channel was launched as Canal+ Film 2 on 1 May 2004. On 1 November 2007 it changed its name to Canal+ Hits as part of a larger reorganization of the Canal+ channels.

In the Swedish feed, it timeshares with Canal+ Sport 2 which broadcasts a few games in the weekend. In the Norwegian and Finnish network the channel is however broadcast in full.

The channel changed name to C More Hits on 4 September 2012 as of big rebranding.

C More was discontinued on 14 August 2023, in favor of TV4 Play in Sweden. Consequently, the channel was rebranded as TV4 Hits and simply as Hits in Norway.

On this channel broadcasts 7:00 AM – 5:00 AM

== See also ==
- TV4 Stars
