= TV4 AB =

Swedish media company

- Type: Subsidiary
- Industry: Media
- Founded: 1984; 42 years ago
- Headquarters: Stockholm, Sweden
- Key people: Mathias Berg (CEO)
- Services: Broadcasting
- Revenue: ▲3,86 Billion SEK (2012)
- Number of employees: 330
- Parent: TV4 Media (2016–present)

TV4 AB (formerly Nordisk Television AB; previously traded as TV4-gruppen) is a Swedish media company owned by Schibsted through TV4 Media (formerly known as Bonnier Broadcasting). The company owns the largest commercial television channel in Sweden, TV4.

From 2007 until 2019, TV4 AB was owned by Bonnier, with Bonnier Broadcasting AB being its parent since 2016. The stock used to be traded at the Stockholm Stock Exchange (OM), but was removed from the OM when Bonnier took full control of the company.

On 20 July 2018, Telia Company announced the acquisition proposal of the Bonnier Broadcasting, which includes this company, for 9.2 billion SEK (roughly US$1 billion). The acquisition was completed on 2 December 2019.

On 25 February 2025, Schibsted Media announced the acquisition proposal of the TV4 Media for 6.55 billion SEK. The acquisition was completed on 1 July 2025.

== History ==
The company was founded in 1984 by Ingemar Leijonborg and Gunnar Bergvall as Nordisk Television AB ("Nordic Television"). They intended to start a Swedish commercial television channel.

It took several years for Leijonborg and Bergvall to find someone willing to invest in their channel, but it was eventually launched on 15 September 1990 as "TV4", broadcasting from the Tele-X satellite. A Norwegian sister channel, TV4 Norway, was also launched, but was sold a few years later.

At the time, it was clear that the government intended to launch a third terrestrial station and that it would be commercially funded. The two main competitors for the new channel were Nordisk Television and Kinnevik (owners of TV3). Eventually it was Nordisk Television who got the license since Kinnevik agreed to withdraw their application. In exchange, Kinnevik bought 30 percent of Nordisk Television and a company called Airtime AB was set up to sell advertising in TV3 and TV4, giving Kinnevik control of almost all television advertising in Sweden. TV4 could start broadcasting terrestrially in the spring of 1992. Nordisk Television discontinued the Airtime agreement in 1993, a decision followed by years of discussion between Kinnevik and the other owners of the company.

Nordisk Television started trading on the Stockholm Stock Exchange in 1994 and changed its legal name to TV4 AB.

With the terrestrial license followed an obligation to give some airtime to different local companies. This would regularly be owned by the TV4 Group in conjunction with local investors and media companies. With the start of TV4 Uppland the number of regional stations reached sixteen. Eventually, the TV4 Group started buying local stations and in 2001 they owned all but one, TV4 Fyrstad, which went bankrupt in 2003. The TV4 Group then merged all regional stations into a single entity, TV4 Sverige AB.

TV4 started broadcasting in the digital terrestrial television network in 1999. In 2001, the TV4 Group started an experimental interactive channel called Mediteve using the space on the digital multiplex. In 2003, a general entertainment channel called TV4 Plus was started. It was followed by TV4 Film in 2004, and TV400 and TV4 Fakta in 2005.

For several years, the TV channels of the TV4 AB wasn't a part of Kinnevik's digital satellite platform Viasat. However, in April 2005, TV4 Plus, TV4 Film and TV400 were launched on Viasat (the TV4 Group channel had to wait until 2006 due to contracts with the Canal Digital platform).

In the digital television franchise round of 2006, the TV4 Group applied for three new digital channels, but none of them were given a license. They did however launch two new channels in November 2006: TV4 Komedi and TV4 Guld.

In May 2006, the TV4 AB bought 51 percent of the sports channel Sport-Expressen from the newspaper Expressen. The ownership was increased to 66.2 percent in May 2007 and the channel was relaunched as TV4 Sport in September 2007.

In November 2006, it was announced that Bonnier and Proventus would buy the share in the TV4's operating company that was then held by Schibsted. The deal was approved in December 2006, making the TV4 almost entirely owned by Nordic Broadcasting Oy, a company owned jointly by Bonnier and Proventus. Proventus sold its shares in Nordic Broadcasting to Bonnier in March 2007, making it a fully owned subsidiary of Bonnier.

The company's previous logo as TV4-gruppen

In early 2008, the company adopted its trade name, TV4-gruppen (lit. 'TV4 Group').

== Businesses ==
TV4 AB operates the following television channels:

- TV4
- Sjuan, formerly TV4 Plus, launched in March 2003 broadcasting sport, games and entertainment, but has since changed focus and since at least 2018 and as of 2021 broadcasts mostly crime drama series and some travel shows, reality shows and documentaries, and on weekends also movies.
- TV4 Film, launched in April 2004 broadcasting uninterrupted movies.
- TV4 Fakta, launched in September 2005, originally planned as a news channel, but eventually becoming a channel only broadcasting documentaries.
- TV4 Guld, launched in November 2006. This channel airs classic TV shows.
- TV4 HD, launched in May 2007, high-definition simulcast of TV4.
- TV12, launched 4 May 2012 as TV4 Sport Xtra, changed to TV12 29 March 2014. Airs mostly reality shows and some entertainment and drama, and occasionally sport, and on weekends also movies.
- TV4 Sportkanalen
- TV4 Stars
- TV4 Hits
- SF-kanalen
- TV4 Fotboll
- TV4 Hockey
- TV4 Motor
- TV4 Tennis
- TV4 Sport Live

The company also owns TV4 Sverige AB that owns all the 25 local stations (of which 13 were defunct in 2014 with 140 people laid off and the rest producing national news only Local news had moved to web only in 2013) and TV4 Digitala Medier that includes the TV4 Groups Text-TV (defunct as of 17 September 2019) and internet services like the websites tv4.se, nyheterna.se (redirecting to tv4.se as of at least 2021) and Fotbollskanalen, and on-demand service TV4 Play. The TV4 Group is also involved in the selling of merchandising, DVDs, CDs, magazines and books relating to the television programmes.

Defunct

- TV4 Science fiction, launched in February 2008 broadcasting science fiction, closed in 2012.
- TV4 Komedi, launched in November 2006. Focused on comedies.
- TV4 News, launched in January 2012 broadcasting news, closed in 2013.
- TV4 Sport (66.2% ownership), sports station in conjunction with daily tabloid Expressen.

== Availability of channels ==
Laws in Sweden state that all television operators must carry the analogue version of TV4 (until 31 January 2008). As of 2005, TV4 is transmitted free-to-air on the digital terrestrial network while TV4 Plus, TV4 Film, TV400 and TV4 Fakta require subscription from Boxer, Canal Digital or Viasat via satellite, or cable TV from several cable networks, including Tele2Vision, Com Hem and Canal Digital. TV4 Plus is available in analogue form via most cable TV networks, while the others are mostly digital-only.
