= MTV Oy =

Finnish media company

- Company type: Private (subsidiary of Schibsted)
- Industry: Media
- Founded: 1957
- Headquarters: Helsinki, Finland
- Key people: Johannes Leppänen (CEO)
- Services: Broadcasting
- Owner: Schibsted (2025–present)
- Number of employees: 330
- Parent: TV4 Media (2016–present)
- Website: www.mtvyritys.fi

MTV Oy (formerly Oy Mainos-TV-Reklam Ab) is a Finnish media company owned by Schibsted through TV4 Media (formerly known as Bonnier Broadcasting). The company owns the largest commercial television channel in Finland, MTV3.

On 20 July 2018, Telia Company announced the acquisition proposal of the Bonnier Broadcasting, which includes this company, for 9.2 billion SEK (roughly US$1 billion). The acquisition was completed on December 2, 2019.

On 25 February 2025, Schibsted Media announced the acquisition proposal of the TV4 Media for 6.55 billion SEK. The acquisition was completed on July 1, 2025.

== Businesses ==
MTV Oy operates the following television channels:

- MTV3
- MTV Sub, formerly TVTV!, Subtv and Sub
- MTV Ava, formerly MTV3 Ava and Ava
- MTV Viihde, formerly Canal+ Series and C More Series. Replaced Canal+ Comedy.
- MTV Aitio, formerly Canal+ Film 1, Canal+ Film, Canal+ and C More First. Replaced Canal+ Gul.
- MTV Juniori, formerly Subtv Juniori, Sub Juniori, MTV3 Juniori and C More Juniori
- MTV Max, formerly MTV3 Max and C More Max
- MTV Urheilu 1, formerly MTV3 Max Sport 1, MTV Sport 1, C More Urheilu and C More Sport 1
- MTV Urheilu 2, formerly MTV3 Max Sport 2, MTV Sport 2 and C More Sport 2
- MTV Urheilu 3, formerly C More Max 2
