= TV4 Film =

Swedish television movies channel

Ownership
- Owner: TV4 AB (Schibsted)
- Sister channels: TV4; Sjuan; TV12; TV4 Fakta; TV4 Guld; TV4 Hits; TV4 Stars; SF-kanalen; TV4 Sportkanalen; TV4 Fotboll; TV4 Hockey; TV4 Motor; TV4 Tennis; TV4 Sport Live

History
- Launched: 18 April 2004

Availability

Terrestrial
- Boxer TV Access: Channel 14

TV4 Film is a Swedish film channel owned by TV4 Group.

TV4 applied for a licence to broadcast a film channel terrestrially in the autumn of 2003 and was granted a licence in December. The channel was launched as TV4 Film in April 2004. The first film shown was Top Gun.

Just one year after the launch, the channel's penetration had reached 26 percent, making TV4 Film the most popular film channel in Sweden. By August–October 2006, it increased to 39 percent.

Films are delivered from several distributors, including MGM, Paramount, Warner Brothers, Nordisk Film, SF and Sonet Film. The channel focuses on "modern classics", meaning that the films shown on the channel are mostly from the 1950s, 1960s, 1970s, 1980s and 1990s.

A Finnish version of the channel was launched in November 2006 in cooperation with MTV3. It is called MTV Leffa.

TV4 Film was commercial-free until October 2011 when it began showing commercial breaks for normal-length films.
