= TV4 (Swedish TV channel) =

Swedish television channel

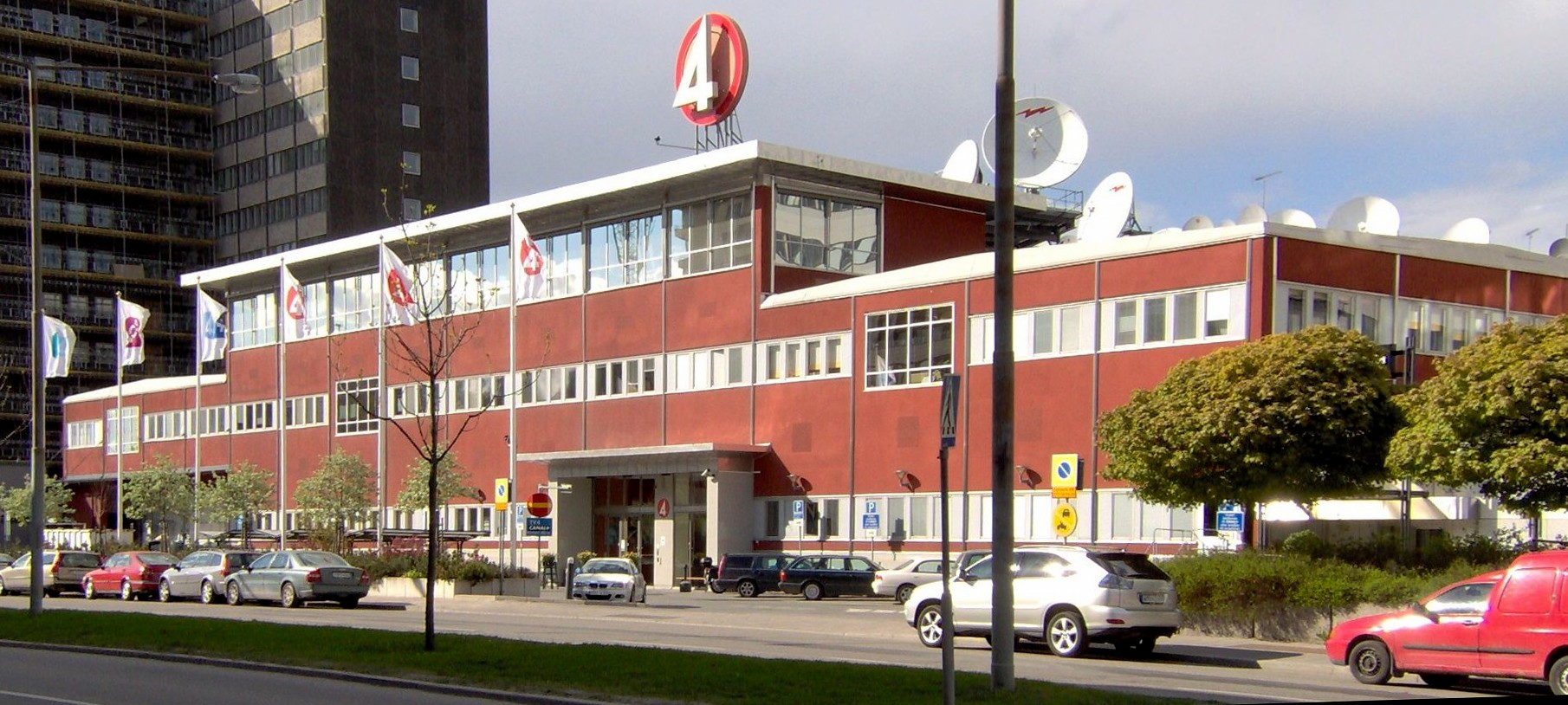
- Country: Sweden
- Broadcast area: Sweden (also available in Norway, Finland and Denmark)
- Headquarters: Stockholm

Programming
- Picture format: 1080i HDTV (downscaled to 16:9 576i for the SDTV feed)

Ownership
- Owner: TV4 AB (Schibsted)
- Sister channels: Sjuan; TV12; TV4 Film; TV4 Fakta; TV4 Guld; TV4 Hits; TV4 Stars; SF-kanalen; TV4 Sportkanalen; TV4 Fotboll; TV4 Hockey; TV4 Motor; TV4 Tennis; TV4 Sport Live

History
- Launched: 15 September 1990

Links
- Website: tv4.se

TV4 (TV fyra) is a Swedish cable and satellite television network owned by TV4 AB, a subsidiary of the TV4 Media AB. It started broadcasting by satellite in 1990 and, between 1992 and 14 January 2026, on terrestrial television. In 1994, TV4 became the largest channel and remained so for a number of years. The two channels of Sveriges Television (SVT) lost more and more viewers for a couple of years. After making schedule changes in 2001, SVT1 had practically the same numbers of viewers as TV4. From 2004 to 2019, the TV4 Group was a fully active member of the European Broadcasting Union.

This channel broadcast 5:50 - 3:00

== History ==
In the spring of 1984, Ingemar Leijonborg and Gunnar Bergvall worked out a business plan for a Swedish commercial TV channel. The plan included a financing calculation for such a channel. It turned out that the project was financially justifiable and they resigned from their jobs, Leijonborg from SVT and Bergvall from Bonnier. In autumn 1985 the investment company Proventus put up SEK 2.5 million as initial project financing. They acquired an office for their newly started company called Nordisk Television AB on Birger Jarlsgatan and a secretary. But a year later, Proventus' interest had cooled and Leijonborg/Bergvall had to find new financiers. In 1987 they brought in new investors, Providentia (a Wallenberg family interest), formerly Föreningsbanken, SPP (later Alecta) and the book publisher Natur & Kultur were prepared to invest ten million kroner. A TV school was started to be able to train TV producers and scriptors. People were recruited, mainly from SVT, for example Lars Weiss, Jan Scherman, Bengt Magnusson and Jan Zachrisson.

The goal was to make an innovative and hipper version of SVT with a heavy newsroom and self-produced series and which would simultaneously become Sweden's largest TV channel. When all the plans were to begin to be realized, a property was rented in Storängsbotten, which was converted into a TV station.

On 15 September 1990 broadcasts began over the then Tele-X satellite. The premiere broadcast had technical problems. The first edition of Nyheterna lured viewers away from the channel. The next day Expressen wrote in its front cover "Lägg ned TV4 – om det inte blir bättre!" (Shut down TV4 - if it doesn't get better!) on its promissory note. That slip sat in many employees' rooms in the early days as a spur to improve. The self-produced drama series Destination Nordsjön and Rosenholm received merciless criticism.

In 1991, two of the channel's oldest entertainment programmes premiered: the Swedish version of Jeopardy! and the Saturday night bingo show Bingolotto. Bingolotto in particular became highly popular.

In autumn 1991 the government was to award a license to an advertising-financed TV channel to broadcast terrestrially. 30 applications were received, of which 20 were filled in on a form that Expressen had published. The two main competitors were TV4 (Nordisk Television) and Rix TV/M3 (Kinnevik). In order to obtain the concession, there were requirements for local distribution of production and for there to be a wide circle of owners. On 11 September 1991, Culture Minister Bengt Göransson announced that M3 would be awarded the concession and that the government would make the formal decision the following day. It was an election campaign and the moderates' party leader Carl Bildt came out and said that a bourgeois government would overturn the decision. Göransson then took back his statement that evening.

Kinnevik then settled with Nordisk Television. In return for withdrawing their application for Rix TV, they were allowed to enter as a 30 percent owner of Nordisk Television. In addition, a company, Airtime, was formed, which would manage the sale of advertising in both TV3 and TV4 and in which Kinnevik owned 55 percent. In this way, Kinnevik was able to gain control over the company that sold 90 percent of the Swedish TV advertising. In July 1993, TV4 terminated the agreement regarding Airtime, and also cut the data connection in a purely physical sense, in order to build up its own sales organization instead. This led to several years of legal battles between Kinnevik and the rest of TV4's owners. The parties settled in autumn 2002 when Kinnevik's owner Jan Stenbeck died.

When Kinnevik became a partner, the founders Leijonborg and Bergvall had to leave the company under sensational circumstances.

Nordisk Television was awarded the license on 7 November 1991. On 2 December 1991 test broadcasts of TV4 began from Gothenburg (UHF channel 46), Hörby (50), Karlstad (46), Malmö (47), Norrköping (54), Stockholm (42), Sundsvall (50), Uppsala (52), Västerås (51), Örebro (58), Linköping (34), Solna (61), Södertälje/Blombacka (53) and Södertälje/Ragnhildsborg (66). Further transmitters were to be added by the end of June 1992.

Terrestrial broadcasts started on 2 March 1992. During that year, Nyhetsmorgon started and marked the introduction of weekday breakfast television in Sweden.

During the 1990s, TV4 would broadcast several popular Friday night entertainment shows such as Fångarna på fortet (Swedish version of Fort Boyard), Kär och galen, Tur i kärlek, På rymmen, Sikta mot stjärnorna (Soundmix Show), Stadskampen (Intervilles) and Småstjärnorna (Mini Playback Show).

They have also broadcast several home-grown sitcoms such as Rena Rama Rolf and En fyra för tre as well as the soap opera Tre kronor.

In the early 1990s, the TV4 Group decided to move their 7pm evening news to 7:30pm in order to compete with the most popular news programme, Rapport, which, at that time, was broadcast on SVT2. This failed and the news was subsequently moved to 6:30pm. In 2004, the evening news was moved to 7pm, and the status quo reinstated.

In 2004, TV4 began transitioning to become a digital-only service, starting by shutting down its analogue satellite signal on 31 March 2004. On 19 September 2005, TV4 began shutting down analogue terrestrial transmissions, starting at the island of Gotland. The analogue shutoff was completed by October 2007.

Since 2004, TV4 has been broadcasting a Swedish version of the internationally popular Pop Idol format.

In July 2018 it was announced that Bonnier Broadcasting would be acquired by Telia Company for 9.2 billion SEK, thus making Telia the new owner of TV4. The acquisition was completed on 2 December 2019.

In February 2025 it was announced that TV4 Media would be acquired by Schibsted Media for 6.55 billion SEK, thus making Schibsted the new owner of TV4. The acquisition was completed on July 1, 2025. Free-to-air terrestrial broadcasting ceased on 12 January 2026, in order to inject more money into its streaming service, TV4 Play.

== Programming ==
TV4 offers a mix of news, sports, drama series, soaps, entertainment, current affairs programmes, sitcoms, feature films, documentaries and phone-in shows. News is an important part of TV4. It broadcasts the news program TV4Nyheterna at 7pm and 10pm and Nyhetsmorgon (News Morning) in the mornings. On weekend mornings there is children's programming in Swedish before Nyhetsmorgon starts. After 11pm until Nyhetsmorgon, it shows reruns and some Swedish and English television series.

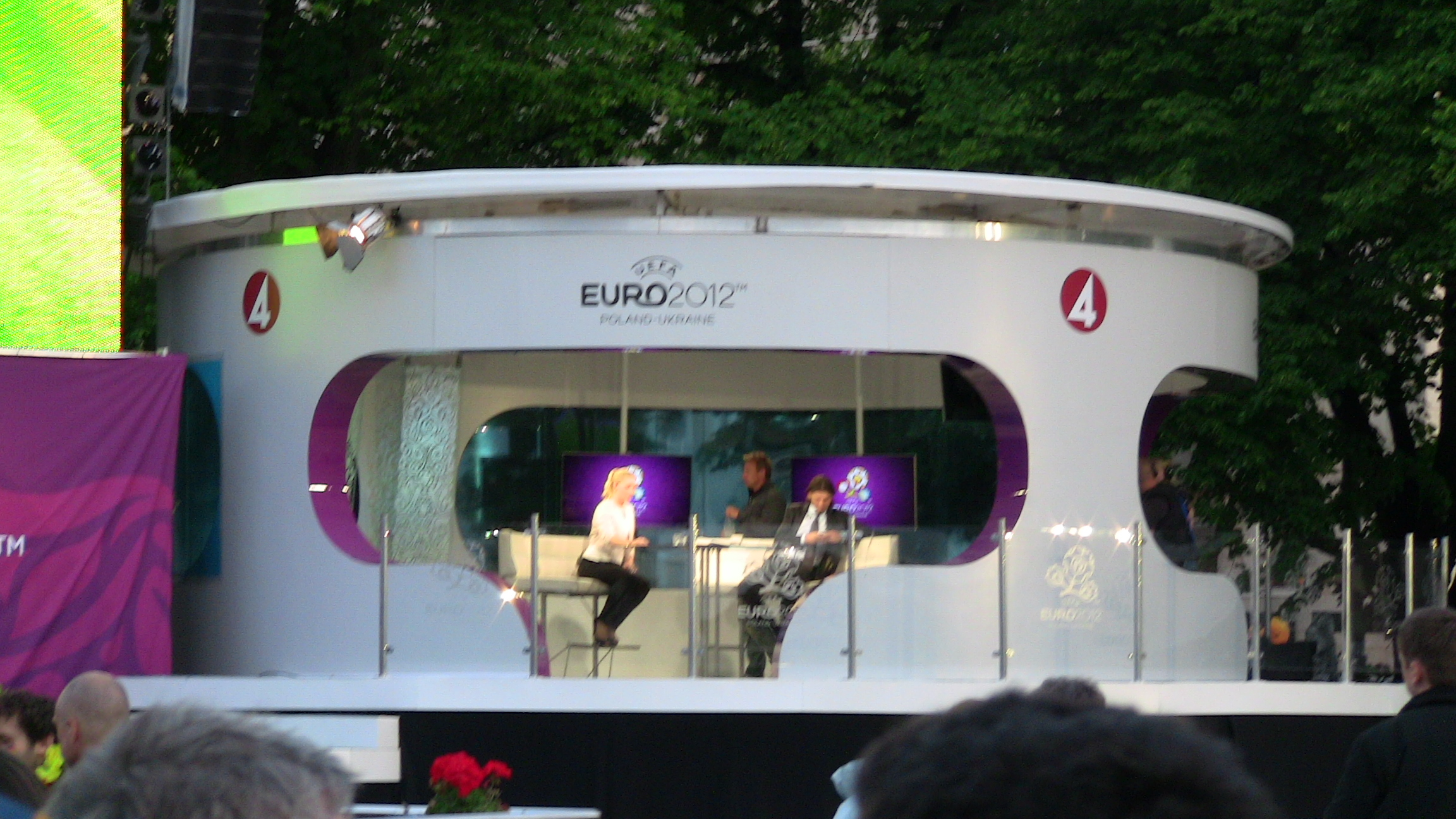
TV4's "fan zone" studio for UEFA Euro 2012 in Stockholm.

After the Nyhetsmorgon ends on weekdays the Efter tio (After ten) starts followed by English spoken TV series up until the news at 7pm. In the daytime on weekends there are often reruns and sports programs. Then main Swedish and English TV programs are broadcast up to the 10pm news. Friday nights have included family entertainment at 8pm since the early 1990s. Bingolotto occupied Saturday evenings from 1991 to 2004. TV4 then moved Bingolotto to Sundays and started broadcasting feature films instead. With the start of Deal or No Deal in 2006, family entertainment returned to Saturday nights. Later, there are other entertainment shows on Saturday evenings. On Sunday evenings, Swedish-produced television programs are shown until 9pm when they show a movie on Saturday nights. They also show a movie after the entertainment show.

After about 11pm until Nyhetsmorgon starts they show reruns and some Swedish and English television series. The foreign programs are mainly from the UK and USA. All foreign programmes, as well as segments of local programmes with foreign language content (e.g. news interviews), are subtitled into Swedish. TV4 also offers investigative journalism programmes, most notably Kalla fakta ("Cold Facts").

=== Regional stations ===
As a part of its public service obligations, TV4 owns and operates a number of regional and local opt-out stations. When the local stations were set up, they were owned by both local investors and the TV4 Group themselves. Since the start of TV4 Uppland in 1996, the number of stations has been sixteen. Although some stations have closed and others have been set up, the total number of stations has stayed unchanged.

The TV4 Group brought out many of the local stations and became the sole owner of fifteen stations in 2001. The only independent station, TV4 Fyrstad, went bankrupt in 2003 and was replaced by TV4 Väst, owned and operated by the TV4 Group. The TV4 Group later merged the stations into five regional companies and in 2004, a single company: TV4 Sverige AB.

As of 2008, these are the local TV4 stations:

- TV4 Värmland (Värmland)
- TV4 Väst ("West")
- TV4 Göteborg (Gothenburg)
- TV4 Halland (Halland)
- TV4 Öresund (The Sound)
- TV4 Sydost ("Southeast")
- TV4 Jönköping (Jönköping)
- TV4 Skaraborg (Skaraborg County)
- TV4 Öst ("East")
- TV4 Stockholm (Stockholm)
- TV4 Mälardalen (Mälaren Valley)
- TV4 Uppland (Uppland)
- TV4 Gävle Dalarna (Gävle and Dalarna)
- TV4 Mitt ("Central")
- TV4 Västerbotten (West Bothnia)
- TV4 Norrbotten (North Bothnia)

After the closedown of the analogue transmitters and the termination of TV4's public service obligations, the pattern of the local stations is due for a major overhaul which will see the number of local stations increase.

On 9 April 2014, TV4 announced the closure of its local news division to strengthen its national news team and fired 140 people. Thirteen out of 21 local offices were closed. As part of the decision, the only offices operational outside Stockholm were Falun, Gothenburg, Jönköping, Linköping, Luleå, Malmö, Skövde, Umeå and Östersund. The final editions went live on 13 June. In 2017, as part of further cost-cutting measures, four more regional offices closed: Sundsvall, Falun, Norrköping and Jönköping.

== TV4 Play and C More ==
TV4 Play is the brand used for the video on demand service offered by the TV4 Group, more specifically to the streaming services offered on the TV4 Play website, www.tv4play.se. Content on TV4 Play usually comes with advertisements, but users can watch the same content without advertisements on the subscription-based C More platform, which also provides a livestream of TV4 and its sister channels.

== Jurisdiction ==
As TV4 is broadcast from Sweden, it has to follow much tighter advertising rules than its main competitors, Nordic Entertainment Group (TV3) and Discovery Communications Nordic (Kanal 5). Initially this meant that the TV4 Group was not allowed to include advertising breaks, meaning that the advertising had to be put in between the programmes.

Nonetheless, the TV4 Group felt the urge to include advertising breaks. Therefore, it made several Inför programmes. The Inför programmes were short versions of TV4 programmes that were scheduled in the middle of programmes. For example, Fångarna på fortet would be divided into two parts and in between these, Inför Bingolotto would be shown. This allowed TV4 to broadcast advertising in the gaps between Inför Bingolotto and the two halves of Fångarna på fortet.

The Broadcasting Commission repeatedly ruled that the Inför programmes couldn't be considered as real programmes. In 2000 they were replaced by a programme called Dagens namn, in which the current name day was mentioned. This was later on replaced by Om en bok in which famous people presented a book they enjoyed.

This ended in April 2002 when a new Radio and TV Law came into force, allowing the TV4 Group to interrupt its programmes for advertising, but not to the same extent as TV3 and Kanal 5.

The Radio and TV Law also restricted the amount of advertising that can be shown to ten percent of the programming. Since TV4 was the only commercial channel allowed to broadcast terrestrially, it had to pay a special fee to the government, consisting of a fixed fee and a variable element based on the amount of advertising that the TV4 Group sells. The TV4 Group worked to have this fee removed, especially with the launch of digital terrestrial television.

The centre-right Reinfeldt Cabinet intended to relax the advertising rules. TV4 would then broadcast up to twelve minutes of advertising (as opposed to the previous ten minutes in prime time and eight minutes during other time). The amount of advertising overall would also raise from ten percent to fifteen percent, giving TV4 the same rules as the UK-based broadcasters.

== Personalities ==
- Adam Alsing
- Agneta Sjödin
- Bengt Magnusson
- David Hellenius
- Jessica Almenäs
- Karolina Stallwood
- Linda Isacsson
- Martin Timell
- Peter Eng
- Peter Jihde
- Yvonne Ryding
