= MTV Aitio =

- Logo used since 14 August 2023
- Country: Finland
- Broadcast area: Finland
- Headquarters: Helsinki, Finland

Ownership
- Owner: MTV Oy (Schibsted)
- Sister channels: MTV3 (HD); MTV Sub (HD); MTV Ava (HD); MTV Viihde (HD); MTV Max (HD); MTV Urheilu 1 (HD); MTV Urheilu 2 (HD); MTV Urheilu 3 (HD); MTV Juniori (HD)

History
- Launched: 1 May 2004
- Replaced: Canal+ Gul
- Former names: Canal+ Film 1 (2004–2005, 2006–2007); Canal+ Film (2005–2006); Canal+ First (2007–2012); C More First (2012–2023)

Availability

Terrestrial
- Antero (Finland): Channel 53

MTV Aitio is a Finnish pay television channel owned by MTV Oy showing movies and TV shows. It is the flagship movie channel of the MTV Katsomo+ package.

== History ==
The channel started out as Canal+ Film 1 on 1 May 2004 and replaced the channel Canal+ Gul. From September 2005 the channel was known as Canal+ Film, but the numeral was added again in November 2006. On 1 November 2007 the channel became Canal+ First as part of a major reorganisation of the Canal+ movie channels. On 14 August 2023, C More First rebranded its name to MTV Aitio.

== Programming ==
- List of programs broadcast by C More

== See also ==
- MTV Juniori
- MTV Max
- MTV Urheilu
- MTV Viihde
