= Sjuan =

Swedish television channel

- Country: Sweden

Ownership
- Owner: TV4 AB (Schibsted)
- Sister channels: TV4; TV12; TV4 Film; TV4 Fakta; TV4 Guld; TV4 Hits; TV4 Stars; SF-kanalen; TV4 Sportkanalen; TV4 Fotboll; TV4 Hockey; TV4 Motor; TV4 Tennis; TV4 Sport Live

History
- Launched: 9 March 2003
- Former names: TV4 Plus

Availability

Terrestrial
- Boxer TV Access: Channel 10

Sjuan (transl. The Seven; formerly TV4 Plus until September 2011) is a Swedish television channel owned by TV4 AB, focusing on entertainment, sports and lifestyle programmes.

The channel was launched in 2003 on digital terrestrial, digital satellite and cable networks. The channel could be received by many households from its launch and became the seventh most-watched television channel in 2005.

Sjuan has been showing Late Night with Conan O'Brien since its launch. In 2004, Sjuan took over Dr. Phil from its parent channel. In 2005, they also took over The Bold and the Beautiful from its parent channel. Sjuan also broadcasts sports, including La Liga and Serie A matches, during weekends.

In April 2011, TV4 announced that TV4 Plus would change its name to Sjuan, with the complete change happening on 12 September 2011. From 1 September 2020, the TV4 Group channels, including Sjuan, became available on the Dplay - Discovery SVOD service (later renamed Discovery+).

Other channels from TV4 AB include TV12 (youth and entertainment), TV4 Film (movies), TV4 Komedi (sitcoms), TV4 Guld (old classic series) and TV4 Fakta (documentaries).

== Identity ==
At first, the channel was intended to be a sports channel, but its scope was widened before launch to include lifestyle programming and entertainment. The initial name, "TV4 Plus", was decided upon during the autumn of 2002.

The first logotype and idents were designed with the British design agency Kemistry. The logo consisted of a cube or a die with '4' and '+' symbols on the sides, which was chosen as the channel primarily contained sports and betting programming. The idents were replaced a few years later.

On 5 February 2007, Sjuan overhauled its on-air look, dropping the cube logo and replacing it with a blue version of TV4's Circle 4 logo (with a plus sign attached to it) and new idents featuring people engaged in different hobbies.

=== Logos ===
The TV4 Plus logo used from 2003 to 2007.

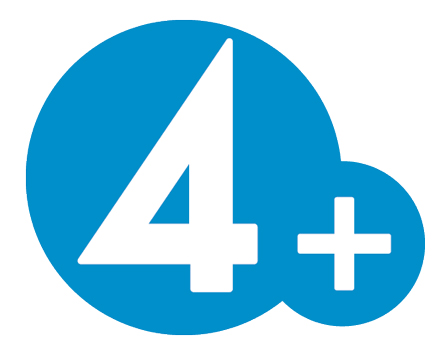
The TV4 Plus logo used from 2007 to 2011.

The Sjuan logo was used from 2011 to 2018.
