= MTV Urheilu =

Finnish sports television network

- Country: Finland
- Broadcast area: Finland
- Headquarters: Helsinki, Finland

Ownership
- Owner: MTV Oy (Schibsted)
- Sister channels: MTV3 (HD); MTV Sub (HD); MTV Ava (HD); MTV Aitio (HD); MTV Viihde (HD); MTV Max (HD); MTV Juniori (HD)

History
- Launched: 1 May 2004
- Replaced: SuperSport; Canal+ Zap
- Former names: SuperSport; Canal+ Sport (2004–2006); Canal+ Sport 1 (2006–2012); C More Sport (2012–2023)

Availability

Terrestrial
- Antero (Finland): Channel 55

MTV Urheilu is a Finnish pay television sports network owned by MTV Oy. It was launched as the Nordic version of Canal+ Sport on 1 May 2004, when C More introduced themed channels for movies and sports. On 1 September 2005, most sports broadcasts were moved to Canal+ Sport and separate versions of the channel were made for Sweden, Denmark, Norway and Finland. With the launch of a second sports channel, the first channels got their current name. Canal+ Sport 1 in Denmark was rebranded as Canal 8 Sport on 13 August 2012.

Channel logos

MTV Urheilu 1's current logo

MTV Urheilu 2's current logo

MTV Urheilu 3's current logo

== Programming ==
- Soccer
  - La Liga
  - Serie A
  - CONCACAF Gold Cup
  - Argentine Primera División
  - UEFA Champions League (Finland only)
  - UEFA Europa League (Finland only)
  - AFC Asian Cup
- Tennis
  - ATP Tour
  - Various tournaments on the WTA Tour
- Ice hockey
  - Elitserien/Swedish Hockey League (SHL)
  - Liiga
  - Mestis
  - IIHF Ice Hockey World Championships
- Basketball
  - National Basketball Association (NBA)
- Mixed martial arts
  - Ultimate Fighting Championship (UFC)
  - World Extreme Cagefighting (WEC)
- Motorsports
  - MotoGP (Finland only)
  - World Rally Championship (WRC) (Finland only)
  - IndyCar
  - Elitserien
  - Scandinavian Touring Car Championship (STCC)

== Past Sports rights ==
- Soccer
  - Premier League
  - Allsvenskan
  - Eredivisie
  - Bundesliga
  - Copa del Rey
  - Primeira Liga
  - Royal League
  - Tippeligaen
  - The Championship
  - League Cup
  - Copa América
  - Barça TV
  - Real Madrid TV
  - Arsenal TV
  - Chelsea TV
- Ice hockey
  - National Hockey League (NHL)
- Mixed martial arts
  - PRIDE Fighting Championship
- Motorsports
  - Formula 3
  - DTM
  - BTCC
- ESPN America programming
- Golf Channel programming

== See also ==
- MTV Aitio
- MTV Juniori
- MTV Max
- MTV Viihde
