= MTV Max =

- Country: Finland

Ownership
- Owner: MTV Oy (Schibsted)
- Sister channels: MTV3 (HD); MTV Sub (HD); MTV Ava (HD); MTV Aitio (HD); MTV Viihde (HD); MTV Urheilu 1 (HD); MTV Urheilu 2 (HD); MTV Urheilu 3 (HD); MTV Juniori (HD)

History
- Launched: 1 November 2006
- Replaced: MTV3+ (November 2002 – November 2006)
- Former names: MTV3 Max (2006-2013); MTV Max (2013-2017); C More Max (2017-2023)

Availability

Terrestrial
- Digita: Channel 40 HD; Channel 42

MTV Max is a Finnish pay television channel owned and operated by MTV Oy. The channel started broadcasting in November 2006 and was originally dedicated to F1 coverage.

== History ==
=== As MTV3+ ===
In November 2002, MTV3 announced the launch of a digital-only channel named MTV3+ focusing mobile games and soap opera re-runs. They were granted a terrestrial mini-license and most of Finland's cable operators carried it.

The channel got a full license in January 2004 and with its possibilities, Formula 1, ice hockey's SM-liiga, Finnish Floorball League, boxing, ski jumping, alpine skiing and some other sports broadcasts were added to the channel's programming. But at the same time, the channel partially turned into a pay-TV channel with a one-time fee of €20 (for Formula 1 & SM-liiga, there was also an extra fee of €70 each). MTV3 used the old mini-license of MTV3+ to create another channel, MTV3+ Extra, which showed overtime periods of SM-liiga matches.

The channel did not focus solely on sports: movies, court sessions and live coverage of reality series were added, while the most notable broadcast was the Tony Halme drug trial in 2004.

=== Relaunch as MTV3 Max ===
MTV3 MAX logo

On 1 November 2006, 4 years from the channel's beginning, MTV3+ was quit with a very small notice of 28 hours. The channel got replaced by four new pay-TV channels, MTV3 MAX, MTV3 Fakta, Sub Leffa and Sub Juniori.

== Sports programming ==
=== Motorsports ===
- Formula One
- GP2
- GP3
- Top Gear
- Documentaries branded as MAX.doc
- MotoGP
- Moto2
- Moto3

=== Ice hockey ===
- Ice Hockey World Championships

=== Ski sports ===
- FIS Cross-Country World Cup
- FIS Ski Jumping World Cup
- FIS Nordic Combined World Cup
- FIS Alpine Ski World Cup

== Other programming ==
=== Talk shows ===
- The Tonight Show with Jay Leno
- Late Show with David Letterman

=== Comedy ===
- The Office
- The Benny Hill Show

=== Reality ===
- Dhani Tackles the Globe
- Hell's Kitchen
- Scrapheap Challenge

=== Fictional ===
- 24

== MTV3's Formula One Team ==
- Niki Juusela - Current race commentary for live broadcasts from 2017.
- Oskari Saari - Race commentary for live broadcasts from 2004 to 2016. Matti Kyllönen has previously provided commentary for the hour-long race summary shown on MTV3.
- Erkki Mustakari - Reporter and interviewer as well as occasional co-commentator with Saari (such as replacing Jyrki Järvilehto in 2010).
- Mervi Kallio - On-track reporter and interviewer for races. Also occasional commentator for Friday practice sessions.
- Mika Salo - Saari's new co-commentator in 2011.
- Ossi Oikarinen - co-commentator since 2013.
- Toni Vilander - co-commentator since 2014.

== MTV3's Ice Hockey team ==
- Antero Mertaranta - Commentator, he commentary every Finnish hockey team game.
- Mika Saukkonen - Commentator.
- Juha Taivainen - Commentator
- Juhani Tamminen - Co-commentator.
- Hannu Aravirta - Co-commentator.
- Pasi Nurminen - Co-commentator.
- Tero Lehterä - Co-commentator.
- Teemu Niikko - Reporter.
- Toni Immonen - Reporter.

== MTV3's Ski sports team ==
=== Cross-Country ===
- Antero Mertaranta - Commentator.
- Toni Roponen - Co-commentator.

=== Ski jumping ===
- Jani Uotila - Commentator.
- Toni Nieminen - Co-commentator.

=== Nordic combined ===
- Mika Saukkonen - Commentator.
- Jani Rajalin - Commentator.
- Hannu Manninen - Co-commentator.

=== Alpine skiing ===
- Antti Haajanen - Commentator.
- Sami Uotila - Co-commentator.

== MTV3's MotoGP team ==
- Marko Terva-aho - Commentator.
- Mika Kallio - Co-commentator.
- Matti Kiiveri - Co-commentator.
- Vesa Kallio - Co-commentator.
