= TV4 Guld =

Swedish television channel

- Country: Sweden

Ownership
- Owner: TV4 AB (Schibsted)
- Sister channels: TV4; Sjuan; TV12; TV4 Film; TV4 Fakta; TV4 Hits; TV4 Stars; SF-kanalen; TV4 Sportkanalen; TV4 Fotboll; TV4 Hockey; TV4 Motor; TV4 Tennis; TV4 Sport Live

History
- Launched: November 3, 2006

Links
- Website: www.tv4.se/guld

TV4 Guld is a Swedish television channel devoted to "classic" programmes such as older television dramas.

The channel launched on November 3, simultaneously with its sister channel TV4 Komedi, on satellite from Canal Digital and cable from Com Hem. The channels were not available on the Viasat satellite platform or Boxer terrestrial package from the start.
