= DNA Oyj =

Finnish telecommunications company

DNA Plc
- Native name: DNA Oyj
- Company type: Public company (Julkinen osakeyhtiö)
- Industry: Telecommunications
- Founded: 2001; 25 years ago
- Headquarters: Helsinki, Uusimaa, Finland
- Key people: Jon Omund Revhaug; (Chairman); Jussi Tolvanen (CEO)
- Products: Retail and wholesale, fixed-line and mobile telecommunications services, internet services, terrestrial television (DVB-T2) network, free to air television services, (DVB-T2), pay-per-view television services (DVB-T/DVB-T2), and cable television (DVB-C) network, free to air/pay-per-view television services (DVB-C)
- Revenue: ▼€934.5 million (2020)
- Operating income: ▲€151 million (2020)
- Net income: ▲€115 million (2020)
- Total assets: ▲€1.611 billion (2020)
- Total equity: ▲€657 million (2020)
- Owner: Telenor
- Number of employees: ▼1,609 (2020)
- Subsidiaries: DNA Store Ltd, DNA Welho Oy and Huuked Labs Oy
- ASN: 16086
- Peering policy: Selective
- Traffic Levels: Not disclosed
- Website: www.dna.fi

DNA Plc (natively DNA Oyj) is a Finnish telecommunications company. It was founded in 2000, and refounded in 2007 after a merger.

DNA offers cellular phone services, FTTx, ADSL, terrestrial television (DVB-T/DVB-T2), cable television (DVB-C) and regular (landline) telephone service.

== History ==
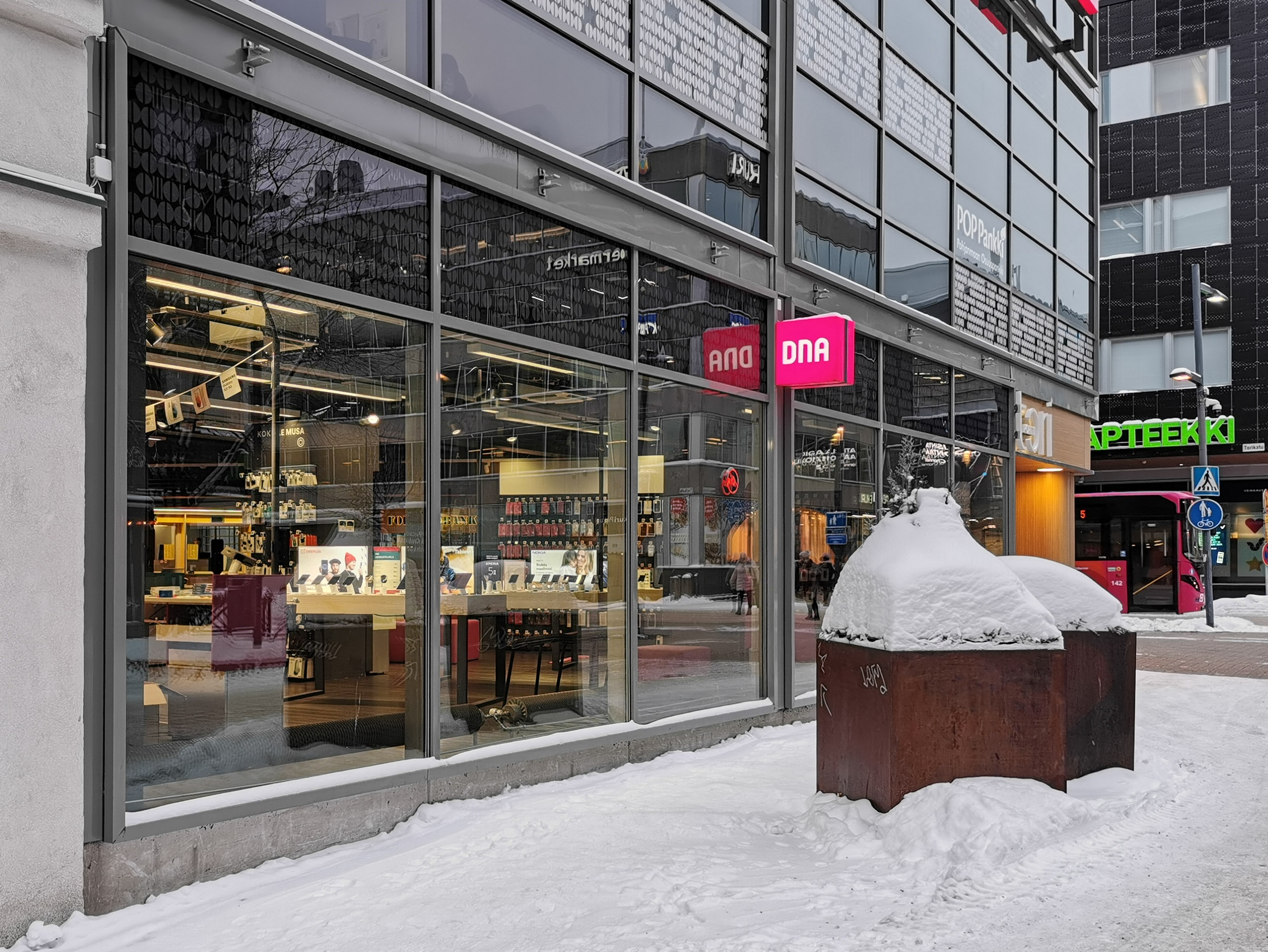
DNA store

DNA traces its beginnings to the "Suomen 3P" mobile phone operations division of the Finnet (fi) group of telephone cooperatives (of which the latter was originally founded in 1921 as a grouping of the over 400 privately owned telephone cooperatives which then existed in Finland in competition with the Finnish PTT agency (fi)) after there was a split-up in the association. The Helsinki Telephone Association (now Elisa Oyj) left Finnet and they needed to find a new owner, which they did in 2001.

In 2007, there began to be new difficulties between the remaining Finnet companies. The largest members merged themselves with DNA and left the association.

In 2012, DNA challenged a long-time dominated Digita Oy in the Finnish terrestrial television network markets, and construction of its own competing digital-terrestrial television network with DVB-T2 technology.

In 2013, DNA acquired the monopoly (in the Finnish market) pay-per-view television provider PlusTV, from the Swedish state owned radio and television network operator Teracom AB. PlusTV offers pay-per-view television services on Digita's and DNA's own digital terrestrial television networks, with DVB-T/MPEG-2 and DVB-T2/MPEG-4 technologies.

In 2014, DNA and Sonera (now Telia Finland) established a joint venture company called Suomen Yhteisverkko Oy, of which its purpose is to build and deploy a shared 4G LTE mobile network in remote Northern and Eastern Finland using the 800 MHz (LTE Band 20) "digital dividend" band. DNA owns 49% of this joint venture.

In 2016, the lower-cost MVNO Moi Mobiili started operations using the DNA/Yhteisverkko mobile network. DNA acquired Moi Mobiili in January 2019.

97.87 percent of DNA is owned by the Norwegian telecommunications company Telenor, which acquired DNA in April 2019.

== See also ==
- List of mobile network operators in Europe
