= MTV Ava =

Finnish TV channel

- Country: Finland

Ownership
- Owner: MTV Oy (Schibsted)
- Sister channels: MTV3 (HD); MTV Sub (HD); MTV Aitio (HD); MTV Viihde (HD); MTV Max (HD); MTV Urheilu 1 (HD); MTV Urheilu 2 (HD); MTV Urheilu 3 (HD); MTV Juniori (HD)

History
- Launched: 1 May 2008
- Former names: MTV3 AVA (March 2008 – January 2011); AVA (January 2011 – December 2022)

Links
- Website: www.avatv.fi

Availability

Terrestrial
- Digital terrestrial: Channel 13

MTV Ava is a Finnish television channel owned and operated by MTV Oy.

== Programming ==
- Dallas
- EastEnders
- Emmerdale (reruns)
- Friends
- Melrose Place
- Neighbours
- Salatut elämät (reruns)
- Smash
- Storm of Love
- The Renovators
- The Tyra Banks Show

== Logos ==
AVA's fourth logo from 2013 to 2022
