= MTV Fakta =

- Country: Finland

Ownership
- Owner: MTV Oy

History
- Launched: 1 November 2006
- Closed: 31 December 2016
- Former names: MTV3 Fakta (2006–2013)

Links
- Website: www.mtv3.fi/fakta

Availability

Terrestrial
- PlusTV: Channel 41
- dna Welho: Channel 93

MTV Fakta was a Finnish documentary channel owned and operated by MTV3. It started broadcasting in November 2006.
