= MTV Sub =

- Country: Finland
- Broadcast area: Finland

Programming
- Language: Finnish
- Picture format: 16:9 1080i (HDTV)

Ownership
- Owner: MTV Oy (Schibsted)
- Sister channels: MTV3 (HD); MTV Ava (HD); MTV Aitio (HD); MTV Viihde (HD); MTV Max (HD); MTV Urheilu 1 (HD); MTV Urheilu 2 (HD); MTV Urheilu 3 (HD); MTV Juniori (HD)

History
- Launched: 1 February 2000; 26 years ago (as TVTV!); 1 August 2001; 25 years ago
- Former names: TVTV! (February 2000 – August 2001); Subtv (August 2001 – January 2008); Sub (January 2008 – December 2022)

Links
- Website: www.mtv.fi/sub

Availability

Terrestrial
- Digital terrestrial: Channel 6

MTV Sub (formerly TVTV!, Subtv and Sub) is a Finnish television channel owned by MTV Oy. The previous owner Alma Media sold Sub and its sister channels (MTV3, C More Max, MTV Ava Radio Nova and Sävelradio) to Swedish Bonnier and Proventus in 2005.

== Programs and audience ==
Sub is an entertainment channel directed at teens and young adults. Programs are mostly imported and of U.S. origin. Sub also shows reruns of popular and cult TV shows. Recently, the share of domestic programming has grown remarkably.

The channel's highest viewership of all time was attracted in 2009, when the finale of Big Brother 2009 was aired.

=== Programming ===
Original title	Country	Finnish title	Genre
American Idol	USA		Reality
Baywatch	USA		Action drama
The Ben Stiller Show	USA		Comedy
Big Brother	Finland	Big Brother	Reality
Daisy of Love	USA	Bändärille sulhanen	Reality
Chuck	USA		Action-comedy
The City	USA	City	Reality
Cold Feet	United Kingdom	Rimakauhua ja rakkautta	Drama
CSI: Crime Scene Investigation	USA		Live action
T@gged	USA		Thriller
CSI: Miami	USA		Live action
The Dudesons	Finland	Duudsonit	Reality
King of the Hill	USA	Kukkulan Kuningas	Animation
Kommissar Rex	Austria	Poliisikoira Rex	Police drama
Marienhof	Germany		Soap opera
Oggy and the Cockroaches	France	Oggi ja torakat	Traditional animation
The Simpsons	USA	Simpsonit	Animated sitcom
Smallville	USA		Action drama
Stargate SG-1	Canada	Tähtiportti	Science fiction
The X Factor USA	USA		Reality
Amor Bravio	Mexico	Valiant Rakkaus	Live action

== Subteksti ==
Subteksti was Sub's teletext service. It contained music news, TV schedules and interactive services like chats and mobile phone games and services.

== Logos and identities ==
MTV Sub's second logo (2001–2008)

MTV Sub's third logo (2008–2013)

MTV Sub's fourth logo (2013–2022)

MTV Sub's fifth logo (2022–present)
