= MTV Juniori =

- Country: Finland

Ownership
- Owner: MTV Oy (Schibsted)
- Sister channels: MTV3 (HD); MTV Sub (HD); MTV Ava (HD); MTV Aitio (HD); MTV Viihde (HD); MTV Max (HD); MTV Urheilu 1 (HD); MTV Urheilu 2 (HD); MTV Urheilu 3 (HD)

History
- Launched: 1 November 2006
- Former names: Subtv Juniori (1 November 2006 – 15 January 2008); Sub Juniori (16 January 2008 – 14 December 2010); MTV3 Juniori (15 December 2010 – 2 November 2013); MTV Juniori (3 November 2013 – 1 March 2017); C More Juniori (1 March 2017 – 10 October 2023)

Links
- Website: www.cmore.fi/juniori

Availability

Terrestrial
- Digita: Channel 43
- DNA Welho: Channel 152

MTV Juniori (formerly Subtv Juniori, Sub Juniori, MTV3 Juniori and C More Juniori) is a Finnish pay television channel targeting children, owned and operated by MTV Oy. It is part of the C More channels package, broadcasting programs and movies for children from 6 am to 8 p.m. The channel is available on digital terrestrial, cable, broadband TV and satellite networks. Current hosts include Pekka Laukkarinen, Mikko Laine, Laura Haikala, Ella Tarvonen and Isa Hänninen.

== Presenters ==
Originally, the channel was hosted by Kana, Janesta (also known as Tea Hiilloste) and Pekka Laukkarinen. Kana left at the end of 2010, and in 2011, Aurora Belegu, Mikko Laine and Laura Haikala joined. Miitta Sorvali also featured as grandma. In 2013, Tea Hiilloste left to focus on children's music and was replaced by Ella Tarvonen.
