= MTV3 =

Finnish commercial television station

- Logo used since 2022
- Country: Finland
- Broadcast area: Nationwide
- Headquarters: Helsinki

Programming
- Picture format: 1080i (HDTV)

Ownership
- Owner: MTV Oy (Schibsted)
- Sister channels: MTV Sub (HD); MTV Ava (HD); MTV Aitio (HD); MTV Viihde (HD); MTV Max (HD); MTV Urheilu 1 (HD); MTV Urheilu 2 (HD); MTV Urheilu 3 (HD); MTV Juniori (HD)

History
- Launched: 13 August 1957; 69 years ago (as a programming block); 1 January 1993; 33 years ago (own channel)
- Former names: MTV (Mainos-TV) (1957–1993)

Links
- Website: www.mtv.fi/mtv3

Availability

Terrestrial
- Digital terrestrial: Channel 3 (HD)

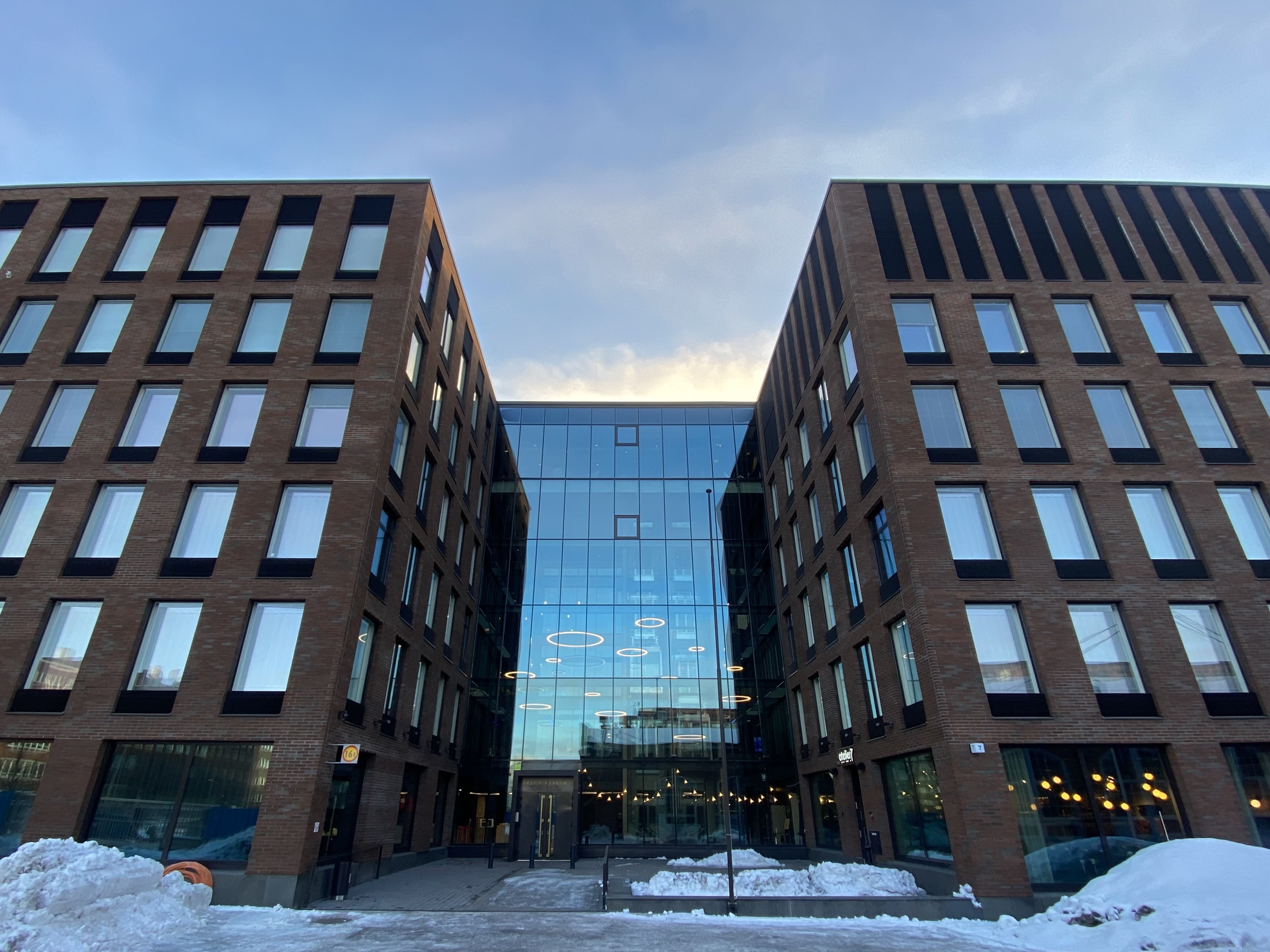
Corporate headquarters in Vallila, Helsinki.

MTV3 (Finnish: MTV kolme, Swedish: MTV tre) is a Finnish commercial television channel owned and operated by the media company MTV Oy, originally launched on 13 August 1957 as a programming block, becoming its own channel on 1 January 1993. It had the biggest audience share of all Finnish TV channels until Yle TV1 (from Yle) took the lead. MTV actually stands for Mainos-TV (literally "Advertisement-TV", i.e. "Commercial TV), due to the channel carrying advertising for revenue. Number 3 was added later, when the channel was allocated the third nationwide television channel and it generally became known as "Channel Three"—Finnish Broadcasting Company's Yle TV1 and Yle TV2 being the first two—and also to distinguish it from the later MTV Finland, which is a Finnish version of Paramount's MTV channel. From 1957 until 2001, the channel's logo was a stylised owl, changed to an owl's eye after an image renewal in 2001, which was then used until 2013. MTV3 has about 500 employees. It is also known as Maikkari ( slang for "Mainos-TV"). From 1986 to 1993, Kolmoskanava was a precursor to MTV3. It was shut down at midnight on December 31, 1992, and MTV3 immediately started broadcasting.

== History ==
=== Early years ===
Oy Mainos-TV-Reklam Ab, or MTV for short, was founded on 29 April 1957 with the idea of establishing a commercial television channel that would show advertisements between programmes. MTV was one of the earliest nationwide private television networks in Europe, preceded only by the ITV network in the United Kingdom and RTL in Luxembourg.

The project set out to lease programming blocks from Yleisradio (YLE), the public broadcaster, whose television project Suomen Televisio had already begun test broadcasts. Yleisradio was initially reluctant but eventually agreed to get additional revenue, which was required to produce programmes to compete with TES-TV. According to the initial agreement, MTV only got around ten hours a week of airtime, all outside the prime time and was not allowed to produce its newscasts nor air party political broadcasts. MTV's first broadcast was on 13 August 1957.

During the early years, MTV was on shaky financial and political grounds. The company survived the troubles and by the early 1960s had begun to establish its position. As Yleisradio expanded the range of television broadcasts, MTV's coverage also increased. This gave them a significant competitive edge over TES-TV since renamed to Tesvisio, whose broadcasts could only be watched in some of the larger cities. In 1964, Yleisradio announced that they had purchased Tesvisio (who were nearing bankruptcy) outright and that they would launch a second channel reorganized from Tesvisio's assets. MTV expressed demands that the second channel be given to them, but Yleisradio refused any such attempts, agreeing however to give MTV more air time, even some prime time, on the second channel. TV-ohjelma 2 ("TV programme 2") launched on 7 March 1965, with Suomen Televisio renamed to TV-ohjelma 1 ("TV programme 1").

Even though YLE and MTV broadcast on the same two channels, they were effectively considered separate networks and organised daily handovers, including airing idents, to the other network whenever MTV's programming blocks began or ended. This could happen independently for either of the two channels, since they had independent schedules as time went on, a distinction in terms of programming between the two broadcasters developed, with MTV focusing on lighter entertainment and YLE on informative programmes. MTV moved their headquarters to a new building, Pöllölaakso (fi:Pöllölaakso (1967–2023)), in Ilmala in 1967. During summer, advertising rates were halved. The first colour broadcast on MTV was aired in 1970. Like with Yleisradio, colour programming increased gradually and by the end of the 1970s, most programmes were in colour. To commemorate the colour transition, MTV introduced a new, simplified owl logo in 1975 which would remain in use until 1993.

=== MTV becomes MTV3 ===
After much political wrangling and prolonged discussions with Yleisradio, in 1981, MTV managed to introduce their news programme, Kymmenen uutiset ("the ten o'clock news"). The company was renamed to MTV Oy in 1982.

In the mid-1980s, Yleisradio, MTV, and Nokia began a joint venture to establish a pay television channel. This project culminated in 1986 in the launch of a third nationwide channel, Kolmoskanava, which was however free-to-air. The channel mostly broadcast imports but some original shows were broadcast as well (albeit not produced by the channel). MTV also began broadcasting their programmes on the channel and started to increase their share in the project. By 1990, MTV had a majority share in the channel.

MTV3, a replacement for Kolmoskanava was launched at midnight on 1 January 1993 in a grand launch event (called "Kanavanvaihtokarnevaalit", literally Channel Switch Carnival). MTV moved all of its programming to MTV3 and stopped leasing blocks from channels one and two, leaving them entirely to YLE and to become the modern channels Yle TV1 and Yle TV2.

=== After 1993 ===
MTV Oy was admitted as a full active member of the European Broadcasting Union in 1993, the same year MTV3 was launched. This membership ended in 2019.

In 2005 Alma Media sold MTV3 and its sister channels (MTV3+, Subtv, Radio Nova and a share in Urheilukanava) to Swedish company Bonnier, which in turn sold the channel to telecommunications company Telia on 20 July 2018.

In late-2022 and early-2023, MTV3 moved its headquarters and studios to its present location at the Fredriksberg D office building in Vallila. The former building at Ilmala was subsequently demolished to make way for apartments.

In February 2025 it was announced that TV4 Media would be acquired by Schibsted Media for 6.55 billion SEK, thus making Schibsted the new owner of MTV3. The acquisition was completed on July 1, 2025.

== Programming ==
MTV3 broadcasts every day from morning to small hours. The pre-dawn hours are allocated to a reel showing clips from programs that are on MTV Katsomo, a streaming service.

Much of the output of MTV3 is a mixture of Finnish versions of popular program formats and of American and British imports. However, MTV3 also airs its own domestic original programming. For example, many of Spede Pasanen's productions were produced for MTV3.

MTV3 maintains two main news broadcasts every day on prime time, the Seitsemän uutiset at 19:00 EET and Kymmenen uutiset at 22:00 EET. MTV3 also broadcast news every morning and short bulletins at 21:00 EET.

MTV3 brought the first daily soap opera to Finland, by showing the American The Bold and the Beautiful, which in 1990s became the most popular show on the channel. In 1999, MTV3 started showing Finnish daily soap opera Salatut elämät.

- Kymmenen uutiset (English translation: The Ten O'Clock News) (1981–)
- Karpolla on asiaa (1983–2007)
- Kymppitonni (1985–2005)
- Speden Spelit (1988–2002)
- Hyvät herrat (1990–1996)
- Seitsemän Uutiset (English translation: The Seven O'Clock News) (1990–)
- Zorro (1990s)
- Wilhelm Tell (English version Crossbow (1991)
- Onnenpyörä (Finnish version of Wheel of Fortune (1993–2001)
- BumtsiBum! (1997–2005, 2017)
- Tilt (1997–1998, 2000–2004)
- Salatut elämät (1999–)
- Kokkisota (Finnish version of Ready Steady Cook (1999–2004, 2017–)
- Rikospoliisi Maria Kallio (2003)
- Haluatko miljonääriksi? (Finnish version of Who Wants to Be a Millionaire? (2005–2007)
- Mallikoulu (2005–2006, 2015)
- Heikoin Lenkki (Finnish version of The Weakest Link (2002–2005)
- Tanssii tähtien kanssa (Finnish Version of Dancing with the Stars (2006–)
- Tappajannäköinen mies (Based on Characters from novels by Matti Rönkä) (2009)
- Putous (2010–)
- Roba (2012–2016, 2019–)
- Fort Boyard Suomi (Finnish version of Fort Boyard (2018–)
- Suomen huippumalli haussa (2022)
- Syksyn sävel (1968–2001, 2011–2013)

=== Cartoons ===
- DuckTales (1987 TV series) (In the 1990s, episodes of the series' first season were shown with Finnish dubbing on the MTV3 channel several times)
- Bananas in Pyjamas (late 1990s)
- Biker Mice from Mars (1994–1996)
- Tiny Toons (1996)
- Chip 'n Dale: Rescue Rangers (1997, 2000–2001, 2005)
- Quack Pack (1997–1998, renewal 2001–2002)
- Animaniacs (1997–1999, renewal 2000–2001)
- Pokemon (1999–)
- Bear in the Big Blue House (2002–2006)
- Staraoke (2003–2011)
- Teenage Mutant Ninja Turtles (2003 TV series) (2003–2009)
- Winx Club (2004-2005, 2006, 2007–2008, 2010–2011, 2012–2013, 2015–2016, 2019-2020)
- Mickey Mouse Works (2005)
- Hamtaro (2005–2006)
- Tetes A Claques (2006-)
- Duel Masters (2005–2006)
- Battle B-Daman (2005–2006)
- Biker Mice from Mars (2006) (2006–2008)
- Yu-Gi-Oh! GX (2006–2008)
- Dinosaur King (2007–2008)
- Bakugan Battle Brawlers (2010–2011)
- Au Pays Des Tetes A Claques (2012-)
- Angry Birds Toons (2013–2016)
- SpongeBob SquarePants (2017–)

== Sports programming ==
=== Football ===
- UEFA Champions League
- UEFA Europa League
- UEFA Super Cup
- La Liga

==== MTV3's Football team ====
- Tuomas Virkkunen - Commentator
- Niki Juusela - Commentator
- Antero Mertaranta - Commentator
- Tero Karhu - Commentator
- Lauri Kottonen - Commentator
- Teppo Laaksonen - Commentator
- Julius Sorjonen - Commentator
- Kim Kallström - Commentator
- Petri Pasanen - Co-commentator
- Mikael Forssell - Co-commentator
- Mika Väyrynen - Co-commentator
- Antti Niemi - Co-commentator
- Ile Uusivuori - studio host

=== Ice hockey ===
- Ice Hockey World Championships
- Champions Hockey League
- SHL

==== MTV3's Ice Hockey team ====
- Antero Mertaranta - Commentator, he commentates every Finnish hockey team game.
- Mika Saukkonen - Commentator.
- Juha Taivainen - Commentator
- Juhani Tamminen - Co-commentator.
- Hannu Aravirta - Co-commentator.
- Pasi Nurminen - Co-commentator.
- Tero Lehterä - Co-commentator.
- Teemu Niikko - Reporter.
- Toni Immonen - Reporter.

=== Motorsports ===
- MotoGP
- MotoGP 2
- MotoGP 3

==== MTV3's MotoGP team ====
- Marko Terva-aho - Commentator.
- Mika Kallio - Co-commentator.
- Matti Kiiveri - Co-commentator.
- Vesa Kallio - Co-commentator.

== Logos and identities ==
Former logo used from 2013 to 2019

Former logo used from 2019 to 2022

current logo from 2022-
