= CJZ =

Australian production company

- Industry: Television production
- Genre: Drama; Factual; Entertainment; Comedy
- Predecessors: Cordell Jigsaw Productions; Zapruder's Other Films
- Founded: 2005; 21 years ago
- Founders: Michael Cordell; Nick Murray
- Headquarters: Sydney, New South Wales, Australia
- Key people: Matt Campbell (CEO); Toni Malone (Director of Production); Claire Tonkin (Head of Drama); Andrew Farrell (Head of Factual); Damian Davis (Head of Entertainment/Comedy)
- Subsidiaries: Greenstone TV
- Website: www.cjz.com.au

CJZ, formerly Cordell Jigsaw Productions, is an Australian production company which have produced more original primetime series than other independent production groups in Australia and New Zealand. The company produces content across all genres, with a focus on factual, entertainment, comedy and drama programming.

CJZ was co-founded by Michael Cordell and Nick Murray, who serve as the company's managing director and creative director respectively. The director of production is Toni Malone and the CEO is Matt Campbell, who is former director of content at SBS and former managing director of Shine Australia.

CJZ also owns Greenstone TV, a New Zealand based television company, with offices in Auckland and Dubai. Greenstone TV was founded in 1994 by John Harris. In December 2013, Greenstone TV was purchased by Australian production company CJZ.

== List of CJZ shows ==
A list of CJZ's programming is below:

- 30 Seconds
- A Case for the Coroner
- AFP
- Aftershock
- Anatomy of a Massacre
- Asylum, Live at the Forum
- BlackJack
- Bondi Rescue
- Bondi Rescue Bali
- Can of Worms
- Christians Like Us
- CNNNN
- Court Justice
- Crossing the Line
- Cruising: The Biggest Storm
- Darby and Joan
- Dave in the Life
- David Tench Tonight
- Demolition Man
- Drama School
- Dumb, Drunk and Racist
- Elders with Andrew Denton
- Enough Rope
- The Ex-PM
- Flying Boomerangs
- The Full Brazilian
- Go Back to Where You Came From
- God on My Side
- The Great Australian Cookbook
- The Great Mint Swindle
- Great Southern Land
- Gruen
- Gruen Nation
- Gruen Planet
- The Gruen Transfer
- Guerrilla Gardeners
- Hardliners
- House of Bond
- House of Hancock
- How Australia Got it's Mojo
- The Joy of Sets
- Julia Zemiro's Home Delivery
- Kebab Kings
- Life Drawing Live
- Living the End
- Marry Me, Marry My Family
- MegaTruckers
- Mr. Black
- Murder in the Outback: The Lees and Falconio Mystery
- Music and Murder
- Muslims Like Us
- My Life is Murder
- The Obesity Myth
- O'Loghlin on Saturday Night
- The Outlaw Michael Howe
- Out of the Question
- Pauline Hanson: Please Explain!
- Part-Time Private Eyes
- Question Everything
- Reality Check
- Recruits: Paramedics
- Recruits
- Reputation Rehab
- Revolution School
- Ron Iddles: The Good Cop
- The Ronnie Johns Half Hour
- Running to America
- Shaun Micallef's On The Sauce
- Shitsville Express
- Sleek Geeks
- Stupid, Stupid Man
- Suspicious Minds
- Tales of the Unexpected
- Three Boys Dreaming
- The Tunnel
- Two Men in a Tinnie
- Two in the Top End
- Two Men in China
- Two on the Great Divide
- Undercurrent
- Uranium
- Wanted
- Welcher & Welcher
- Working Class Boy
- The Year of the Dogs
- You're Skitting Me

=== Greenstone TV shows ===
- 5 Days in the Red Zone
- AEF: 360
- The Amazing Extraordinary Friends
- Ask Your Auntie
- Bella
- The Big Ward
- Border Patrol
- Business of Crime Strand
- Charlotte My Story
- Coastwatch Oz
- Coastwatch
- Crash Investigation Unit
- Crump
- The Cul de Sac
- Decades in Colour
- Dog Squad
- Emergency
- Epitaph
- Fighting Fat
- Going Going Gone
- Gutsful!
- Highway Cops
- Highway Patrol
- History Under the Hammer
- Hudson and Halls
- in beTWEEN
- Keeping it Pure
- Kirsa: A Mother's Story
- The Kiwi who Saved Britain
- Mercury Lane
- Mike King Tonight
- Motorway Patrol
- Neighbours at War
- The Outsiders
- Private Lives Strand
- Raise My Kids
- Renters
- Saving the World from My Shed
- School of Home Truths
- The School of Series and Format
- SCU: Serious Crash Unit
- Secret Agent Men
- Shipwrecked
- Showtime
- Special Investigators
- Spellbound
- Taonga
- The Tem Show
- Type II: The Silent Killer
- Under the Bridge
- Unsung Heroes
- The Women of Pike River
- Young Ocean Explorers
- The Zoo
