= Canal 9 (Danish TV channel) =

Danish TV channel

- Broadcast area: Denmark

Ownership
- Owner: Warner Bros. Discovery EMEA (Skydance Corporation)
- Sister channels: Kanal 4 Kanal 5; 6'eren Eurosport 1 Eurosport 2

History
- Launched: 17 July 2009

Links
- Website: www.discoveryplus.com/dk/channel/canal-9

Availability

Terrestrial
- Boxer: Channel 30

Canal 9 is a Danish pay television channel owned by Warner Bros. Discovery EMEA, previously owned by C More Entertainment from 2009 to 2015.

The channel is a retro channel that shows older documentary series from the Discovery Channel and old action and comedy series like Miami Vice, The A-Team, Magnum, P.I. and M*A*S*H and with football in the weekends from Danish Superliga plus UEFA Europa League. The channel share sports rights with Eurosport and 6'eren; it was original launched as a low-pay sister channel to Canal+ in July 2009.

== History ==
Canal9 proposed logo, owned by Canal+ (proposed), before its launch.

The channel was announced on March 20, 2009. There had been some uncertainty as for the distribution for the channel, as neither YouSee nor Telia Stofa and Boxer had expressed interest in distributing the channel. On March 25 it was announced that Canal Digital would broadcast the channel exclusively on satellite. The channel would cost 23,95 DKK, which was slightly less than its competitor TV 2 Sport.

Canal 9 launched on July 17, 2009 with the Danish action movie In China They Eat Dogs. From the start, it was available from Canal Digital, ComX, Smile Content and several community antennas and fiber networks.

Canal 9 became available terrestrially in July when it temporarily replaced Kanal København in Copenhagen where it broadcast until October 31, 2009. After this, it started to broadcast from Boxer's transmitters nationwide. On September 15, it was added to YouSee's cable network, where it initially be available digitally on the Middle package.

From the start in July 2009, Canal 9 had secured many football rights including matches from FIFA World Cup 2010, Danish Superliga, Serie A, Premier League, The Championship, La Liga, Eredivisie and League Cup but also the rights to events from UFC and TNA Wrestling and the 2009 World Championships in Athletics and handball from EHF Champions League.

On September 9, 2009, it was announced that Canal 9 has secured the rights to Handball-Bundesliga.

On September 24, 2009, it was announced that Canal 9 will show the WTA 2009 BGL Luxembourg Open with the top-seeded Caroline Wozniacki.

On October 22, 2009, it was announced that Canal 9 has secured the rights to the 2009 Handball Supercup.

=== 2010 ===
On January 12, 2010, it was announced that Canal 9 has secured the rights to the 2010 tournament of Copa del Sol.

On February 8, 2010, it was announced that DR, TV2, Eurosport and Canal 9 will show more them 150 hours together from the 2010 Winter Olympics

On May 10, 2010, Canal 9 has secured the rights for two of Denmark's national teams qualifying matches for the UEFA Euro 2012 against Iceland June 4, 2011 and against Cyprus October 7, 2011

On May 15, 2010 it was announced that the owners of Canal 9, TV4 Group has secured the right to UEFA Euro 2012 in Denmark, but it is still uncertain whether the tournament will be shown on Canal 9 because of the low ratings.

On August 2, 2010 it was announced that Canal 9 has the rights to The Championship for the 2010/11 season.

On September 11, 2010 it was announced that Canal 9 has secured the rights to Lingerie Football League.

=== 2011 ===
On January 20, 2011, it was announced that Canal 9 has secured the rights to the 2011 tournament of Copa del Sol.

On February 15, 2011, it was announced that TV4 Sport and Canal 9 have secured the rights to IIHF World Championships from 2012 to 2017.

On June 22, 2011 it was announced that Canal 9 will show some of the matches from the 2011 Copa América but most of the tournament will be shown on Canal+ Sport 1.

On June 24, 2011, it was announced that Canal 9 will show the WTA 2011 Swedish Open with the top seeded Caroline Wozniacki.

On July 5, 2011, it was announced that Canal+ Sport 1 & Canal 9 has secured the rights to UEFA Europa League for 3 years from the 2012/13 season.

On July 12, 2011, it was announced that Canal+ Sport 1 & Canal 9 has extended the rights to La Liga for four more years till 2015.

On July 27, 2011, it was announced that the TV miniseries The Kennedys will get Danish TV premiere on Canal 9.

On August 13, 2011 www.kampanje.com start writing about that Canal 9 will be launched in a Norwegian version on October 1, 2011 and vill replace TV4 Fakta in Norway.

The 2011–12 season of The Championship and Serie A was originally scheduled only on Canal+ Sport 1 but after wild protests from viewers on their Facebook page, they decided to show a match at 4 p.m. from The Championship, followed by a match from Serie A at 6 p.m. on Saturday when possible; big matches from Danish Superliga and La Liga will still have priority in the time period, this was announced on their Facebook page on August 25, 2011.

On September 12, 2011, it was announced that Canal 9 had lost one of their strongest football rights, The Danish Superliga from the 2012–13 season, to Viasat and TV2 Sport.

On September 21, 2011, it was announced that Canal 9 has bought back 66 matches per season from The Danish Superliga from Viasat, valid from season 2012/13 to 2014/15.

Back in May 2010 it was announced that the Canal 9 and TV4 Group has secured the right to UEFA Euro 2012 in Denmark, but it was uncertain whether the tournament will be shown on Canal 9 because of the low ratings and the following strong focus on the problem in the media that Canal 9 had the rights as well as the two qualifying matches against Iceland and Cyprus, specially the Danish newspaper Ekstra Bladet has been after Canal 9 and called them "The Secret Channel", and several angry viewers have driven campaignings "Denmark national football team's matches back on national TV and not on Pay-TV" on Ekstra Bladet's webpage "Nationen" and on Facebook. So on October 10, 2011, it was announced that Canal 9 and TV4 Group has sold the rights to the two national Danish TV-Stations TV2 and DR.

Through late 2010 and 2011 became Canal9 every Monday to Friday more a documentary channel like the Swedish TV4 Fakta and has the same rights, while the weekend was still dedicated to football and movies including UFC on Friday nights. Sports rights as Handball, wrestling, Powerboat, tennis and ice hockey were dropped to get a more strong focus on football and the channel changed the slogan from Denmark's new sports channel to Denmark's new football channel – we live football.

Through the years, several sports presenters and commentators have switched to Canal 9 including Klavs Bruun Jørgensen, Stig Tøfting, Erik Rasmussen, Michael Gravgaard, Line Bilenberg, Jesper Simo, Mette Cornelius Esben Hansen and latest Flemming Povlsen in 2014.

=== 2012 ===
On January 11, 2012, it was announced that Canal 9 will bring back the TV soap The Bold and the Beautiful in March 2012 after Kanal 4 dropped the series in November 2011 because of low ratings, fans of the series started a massive campaign on Facebook trying to get back the series on Danish television and it succeed with Canal 9 after two months. And Canal 9 has scheduled the series to 5:30 P.M.

Back in February 2011, it was announced that Canal 9 had secured the rights to ice hockey IIHF World Championships from 2012 to 2017 but on February 7, 2012, it was announced that Canal 9 had sold the rights to TV2 Sport for a three-year period from 2012–2014.

On February 21, 2012, it was announced that Canal+ Sport 1 has extended the rights to Serie A for there more years till 2015, and Canal 9 will still show one weekly match with this new deal.

On July 3, 2012, it was announced that Canal 9 would get a new sister channel called Canal 8 Sport, and will be dedicated to sports and will start August 13, 2012, Still there will be football on Canal 9 in the weekends from La Liga, Serie A and Danish Superliga. UEFA Europa League on Thursday nights, and UFC replays on Friday nights.

And on July 4, 2012, it was announced that the new Canal 8 Sport will replace Canal+ Sport 1 in Denmark. and on the same day Canal 9 HD was announced, and will start also on August 15, 2012, and Canal 8 Sport HD was also announced, and will start in the beginning of 2013.

On July 5, Canal 9 announced on their Facebook page that they have not extended their right to English football (The Championship & League Cup) because of low ratings, they tried with regular airtime and gave it another chance in the 2011/12 season after wild protest on their Facebook page from the viewers, when they talked about already in 2011 that they would not extend the rights, but it was still no success in the 2011/12 season.

Canal 9 HD launched on August 15, 2012. From the start, it was available from Canal Digital, Stofa, YouSee & TDC TV several community antennas and fiber networks.

On December 17, 2012, the channel became available in Viasat's sports package on satellite and on IPTV Network Waoo together with Canal 8 Sport

=== 2013 ===
In late February 2013 it was announced that the channel after only one year dropped the TV soap The Bold and the Beautiful because of low ratings and again fans of the series started a massive campaign on Facebook trying to get back the series on Danish television until now with no success.

=== 2014 ===
Because of UFC started their own streaming service UFC Fight Pass could Canal 9 & Canal 8 Sport not get the extension of their rights to the UFC PPV and UFC Fight Night, but they would still be able to show the UFC's TV shows like UFC Unleashed, UFC Main Event & classics WEC Events. This was announced on their Facebook page on January 4, 2014.

On March 1, 2014 it was announced that C More & Canal 9 & Canal 8 Sport in Denmark has made a new deal with UFC, they get the rights to the UFC PPV and UFC Fight Night for 2014 & 2015. This was announced on their Facebook page.

On March 14, 2014, it emerged that TV4 Group and C More Entertainment, might sell Canal 8 Sport and Canal 9 in Denmark because of the poor economy, according to the newspaper BT, they are currently negotiating with TV 2 Denmark and SBS Discovery Media.

On June 26, 2014, it was announced that Canal 9 & Canal 8 Sport had lost one of their strongest football rights, The Danish Superliga from the 2015–16 season, to Viasat and SBS Discovery Media.

Later on June 26, 2014, it was announced that Discovery Networks Northern Europe and C More Entertainment has entered into an agreement that Discovery Networks Northern Europe has the option to purchase Canal 8 Sport and Canal 9 of C More Entertainment in 2015. The Agreement is an extension of the SBS Discovery Media has just signed a six-year agreement for the rights to two weekly matches from The Danish Superliga. The two matches as SBS Discovery Media bought is the 2nd and 5th match the selection from every round (the matches that Canal 9 has been showing since 2009] and the agreement will take effect from season 2015/16 and will run for six years. And the plan is to continue The Danish Superliga on Canal 8 Sport and Canal 9 after summer 2015.

The agreement with C More Entertainment also means that Discovery Networks Northern Europe August 1, 2014 will takes over the sale of television advertising on the two channels.

On July 18, 2014, Canal 9 & Canal 8 Sport announced on their Facebook page that they had not extended their right to Eredivisie.

On September 26, 2014, Discovery Networks Northern Europe announced that they would use the option and buy Canal 8 Sport and Canal 9, the purchase must be approved by the Danish competition authorities and the purchase is expected to take in place during 2015.

=== 2015 ===
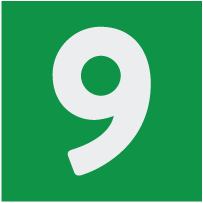
Canal 9 second logo from 2015 until 2024.

On May 27, 2015, The Danish competition authorities announced that they have approved Discovery Networks Northern Europe purchase of Canal 8 Sport & Canal 9, they take over the channels from July 1, 2015.

On May 28, 2015, Discovery Networks Northern Europe announced that they will merge Canal 8 Sport and Eurosport 2 in to Eurosport DK in Denmark from July 1, 2015, and take the rights from the two channels into one channel and with the most popular from Eurosport now in Danish with more rights targeted the Danish viewers, and with 2,400 hours of live sports a year, Eurosport DK will be the channel with the most live sports hours per year. With sports rights such as football from Danish Superliga, Bundesliga, Major League Soccer, Capital One Cup, UEFA Euro 2016 qualifying, Tennis from ATP Tour, WTA Tour and 3 Grand Slam, Cycling from UCI World Tour, Winter sport, Motorsports and much more. At the same time they also announced that Canal 9 will get a new name at a later time, and will still broadcast documentaries, drama & crime series, movies and sports on weekends.

On June 4, 2015, Discovery Networks Northern Europe announced that they had secured the rights to UEFA Europa League for 3 years from the 2015/16 season. It will be broadcast on Canal 9, 6'eren and Eurosport

On Oktober 29, 2015 it vas announced that Modern Times Group had sold half of the rights to Premier League, La Liga and Serie A to Discovery Networks Northern Europe they will share the rights for 3 years from the 2015/16 season. which meant that the Serie A & La Liga will continue to be broadcast on Canal9 in weekends.

=== 2016 ===
In the early 2016 Discovery Networks Northern Europe changed the channel into a retro channel that shows older documentary series from the Discovery Channel and old 80s action & comedy series like Miami Vice, The A-Team, Magnum, P.I. and M*A*S*H and still with football in the weekends.

=== 2017 ===
In the beginning of August 2017, Discovery Networks Northern Europe and Eurosport did not extend the rights to the Bundesliga and it was decided to transfer La Liga exclusively to Eurosport 2 and Serie A would future be exclusively on Canal 9, Still, Canal 9 will broadcast matches from Danish Superliga, plus extra matches from UEFA Europa League, Fa Cup and from the European 2018 FIFA World Cup qualification.

== Sports rights ==
=== Football ===
- UEFA Nations League
- UEFA Europa League
- Danish Superliga
- Fa Cup
- EFL Cup

== Past sports rights ==
=== American Football ===
- Lingerie Football League (Season 2010/11-2011/12)

=== Athletics ===
- 2009 World Championships in Athletics

=== Beach Volley ===
- 2009 Beach Volleyball World Championships

=== Fighting ===
- TNA iMPACT! (2009–2010)
- TNA PPV (2009–2010)
- The Ultimate Fighter (IX – XV)
- Monster Knockouts (2010–2014)
- UFC PPV (2009–2015)
- UFC Fight Night (2009–2015)

=== Football ===
- UEFA Euro 2012 qualifying
- UEFA Euro 2016 qualifying
- 2018 FIFA World Cup qualification
- 2011 Copa América
- FIFA World Cup 2010
- Copa del Sol (2010 & 2011)
- Premier League (season 2009/10)
- League Cup (season 2009/10-2011/12 & 2015/16-2016/17)
- The Championship (season 2009/10-2011/12)
- Eredivisie (season 2009/10-2013/14)
- La Liga (season 2009/10-2017/18)
- Copa del Rey (season 2009/10-2017/18)
- Serie A (season 2009/10-2017/18)

=== Handball ===
- Handball Supercup 2009
- Bundesliga (season 2009/10-2010/11)
- EHF Champions League (season 2009/10-2010/11)

=== Poker ===
- Poker After Dark
- National Heads-Up Poker Championship
- High Stakes Poker

=== Powerboat ===
- F1 Powerboat World Championship (2009–2010)
- Class1 Powerboat Championship (2009–2010)

=== Tennis ===
- WTA 2009 BGL Luxembourg Open
- WTA 2011 Hong Kong Tennis Classic
- WTA 2011 Swedish Open
- Various tournaments on the ATP Tour (2010–2015)

=== Winter Olympics ===
- 2010 Winter Olympics

== Programming ==
=== Sports reality/documentary series ===
- The Best Football Funnies Ever
- Bullrun
- Bullrun: Cops, Cars & Superstars
- Bullrun Rally
- Burnout
- Epic Conditions
- Football's Greatest
- International Football Rivalries
- Jakt och Fiske
- Magic Of The FA Cup
- Pros vs. Joes
- Season On The Edge
- Shaq Vs.
- World's Best Putter Australia
- The World's Wackiest Sports

=== Drama series ===
- The A-Team
- Cheers
- Frasier
- Magnum, P.I.
- Miami Vice
- M*A*S*H
- MacGyver
- Nash Bridges
- Walker, Texas Ranger
- Band of Brothers
- Battlestar Galactica
- The Bold and the Beautiful
- Caprica
- Covert Affairs
- Crash
- The Dead Zone
- Dr. Quinn, Medicine Woman
- Earth 2
- Fringe
- Forever
- From the Earth to the Moon
- Futurama
- Galactica 1980
- Gunslingers
- Hill Street Blues
- In Plain Sight
- JAG
- The Kennedys
- Law & Order
- Law & Order: Criminal Intent
- Law & Order: Special Victims Unit
- Major Crimes
- Medium
- Monk
- Monty Python's Flying Circus
- The Practice
- The Ricky Gervais Show
- The Shield
- Six Feet Under
- The Sopranos
- Spartacus: Gods of the Arena
- Spartacus: Blood and Sand
- Spartacus: Vengeance
- Spartacus: War of the Damned
- Star Trek: Deep Space Nine
- Steven Seagal: Lawman
- Water Rats
- The Wire

=== Reality/documentary series ===
- American Loggers
- BBQ Pitmasters
- Airplane Repo
- How It's Made
- Treehouse Masters
- Outback Truckers
- Food Factory USA
- Adoption Diaries
- After the First 48
- American Gangster
- American Guns
- Animal Squad
- Asian Crime
- Beach Patrol
- Behind Bars: World's Toughest Prisons
- Beyond the Darklands
- Beyond The Headlines
- Biography
- Borderline
- Brit Cops
- Bullied: You're Not Alone
- Buying Alaska
- Campus Vets
- Cheaters
- Chopper Rescue
- CIA Secret Wars
- Cops
- Cops Reloaded
- Courage in Red
- Crash Investigation Unit
- Crash Scene Investigators
- The Crime Chronicles
- Crime Stories
- Crimes that Shook Britain
- D.C. Children's Lifeline
- Deals from the Dark Side
- Dirty Jobs
- Doctors and Nurses at War
- Dog Patrol
- Dominick Dunne's Power, Privilege, and Justice
- The FBI Files
- Fifth Gear
- The First 48
- The First 48: The Killer Speaks
- The First 48: Missing Persons
- Forensic Files
- Fraud Squad TV
- Ghost Adventures
- Helicopter Heroes
- Highway Patrol
- Hogan Knows Best
- How Clean Is Your Crime Scene
- Human Wrecking Balls
- I Survived...
- Ice Pilots NWT
- The Incurables
- Inside The Firestorm
- Interpol Investigates
- Intensive Care Unit
- Intervention
- It Could Happen Tomorrow
- Lifeline
- Lost Treasure Hunters
- Maternity Ward
- Medics
- Missing
- Most Daring
- Mostly True Stories: Urban Legends Revealed
- Noise Cops
- Obsessed
- Oddities
- On Patrol With Santa Barbara PD
- Operation Repo
- Outcast Kustoms
- Pawn Stars
- Police Patrol
- Prison Wives
- Psychic Kids
- Pushing the Limit
- Quest For K2
- Real Rescues
- Railroad Alaska
- Resident Life
- Road Wars
- Rookies
- Sea Patrol UK
- Serious Crash Unit
- Shark Chasers
- Special Delivery: Baby ER
- State Parole
- Storm Chasers
- Storm Stories
- Street Law
- Stunt Stars
- Surf Patrol
- Surgeon
- Survival with Ray Mears
- Ten 7 Aotearoa
- The Suspects
- Top 20 Countdown
- Top Shot
- Trouble In Paradise
- Vanished With Beth Holloway
- Way of Life
- Where Were You? Events that Changed the World
- Wild Animal ER
- Women Behind Bars
- Women of Justice
- World of Stupid
- World War II Lost Films
- World's Toughest Cops

== Advertisements ==
All advertisement sales are handled by Discovery Networks Nordic.
