= Greenstone TV =

Television production company, New Zealand

- Type: Subsidiary
- Industry: Film, television
- Founded: 1994 (as Greenstone Pictures)
- Founder: John Harris
- Headquarters: Auckland, New Zealand
- Area served: Australasia
- Key people: Rachel Antony (CEO)
- Products: Popular factual, entertainment, drama and documentary
- Parent: CJZ
- Website: greenstonetv.com

Former Greenstone TV logo

Greenstone TV (or simply Greenstone) is a New Zealand–based television production company who produce factual, entertainment, drama and documentary television programs. Productions have been made for TVNZ 1, TVNZ 2, Three and Prime in New Zealand, and the Seven Network in Australia.

Greenstone was founded in 1994 by John Harris. In December 2013, Greenstone was purchased by Australian company CJZ (Cordell Jigsaw Zapruder) creating an independent international production group. Greenstone’s Chairman is Richard Driver, appointed in 2017.

Notable programs produced by Greenstone include long-running factual series Motorway Patrol, Highway Patrol, Neighbours at War, Border Patrol, Dog Squad and Coastwatch.

In 1998, Greenstone was awarded a Bravo award by the New Zealand Skeptics for The Mighty Moa.

== Productions ==
=== Drama ===
- The Cul de Sac
- Secret Agent Men
- The Amazing Extraordinary Friends
- Bella
- My Life Is Murder (season 2)
- Kid Sister
- Happiness (Tv series)

=== Factual / reality series ===
- The Big Ward 2015 NZ On Air funded for TV2
- Highway Cops (2012–Present) Series 3
- Renters (2009–Present) Series 5
- Coastwatch Oz (January 2014 – January 2015) Season 1
- Dog Squad (2008–Present) Series 7
- Border Patrol (2009–Present) Series 7
- Highway Patrol (September 2009 – Present) Series 8
- Motorway Patrol (September 1999 – Present) Series 16
- The Zoo Series 1 - 12
- Crash Investigation Unit (August 2008 - July 2011) Seasons 2
- Emergency
- Neighbours at War (2005–Present) Series 8
- Don't (2025)
- School of Home Truths
- Fighting Fat
- Serious Crash Unit (2001 - 2015) Series 7
- Going Going Gone
- Ask Your Auntie
- Special Investigators
- The Tem Show
- Mike King Tonight
- How's Life?
- Secret New Zealand
- Mercury Lane
- Epitaph
- Shipwreck
- Guess Who’s Coming to Dinner?

=== Factual / reality series ===
Title	Total seasons	Total episodes	Broadcast Years	New Zealand Network Aired	Australia Network Aired	Status
Motorway Patrol	16	-	2001–Present	TV2	Channel 7	Returning Series
Serious Crash Unit	07	-	2001-2015	TV2	Channel 7	Ended (2015)

=== Documentaries ===
- The Women of Pike River
- Decades In Colour" 2015
- The Kiwi Who Saved Britain: The Keith Park Story
- Stolen Memories
- Fatal Fires
- Baby Charlotte
- One of a Kind – Baby Keegan
- BIG
- Private Lives of Little People
- To Hell and Back - Tanjas’ story
- Cave Creek - The Full Story of a National Tragedy
- Back from the Dead - The Saga of the Rose Noelle
- Crump
- Do or die - Lost in the Bush
- Secrets of Car Thieves
- The Business of Burglary.
