= C More Tennis =

Scandinavian television channel

- Country: Sweden
- Broadcast area: Scandinavia

Programming
- Language: Scandinavia

Ownership
- Owner: TV4 Group and C More Entertainment
- Sister channels: Canal 9 (Denmark), Canal 8 Sport and C More

History
- Launched: September 4, 2012
- Replaced: Canal+ Sport 2
- Closed: January 1, 2017
- Replaced by: C More Live 5

C More Tennis was a Scandinavian premium sports channel which replaced Canal+ Sport 2 on September 4, 2012, and became a sports channel with only tennis from ATP Tour, WTA Tour and Davis Cup. The channel also had the rights to the Grand Slam tournament Wimbledon.

The channel was available:

In Sweden through the C More packets: C More Max, C More Sports and C More Family.

In Norway, through the C More packets: C More Total and C More Sports.

In Finland through the package: MTV3 Total.

However, it was not meaningful in the first place that the channel should be available in Denmark since Canal 8 Sport substituted C More Sports and Tennis would be shown there, but the channel is available through C More Film package from Canal Digital, YouSee and Altibox together with C More Extreme. But in early 2013, it was recognized that there was not always room till all tennis tournaments on Canal 8 Sport so that the channel was in March 2013 made available through YouSee where the channel could be optional as an additional channel to 30 Danish krone. Also C More Extreme was made an additional channel to 30 Danish krone.

== History ==
The channel got in early 2013 the rights to the WTA Tour, but only in Sweden, Norway and Finland, in Denmark, TV3 Sport 2 have the rights, So the WTA Tour transmissions will be blocked in Denmark together with The Grand Slam tournament Wimbledon, which also TV3 Sport 2 has the rights to.

== Tennis Rights ==
- ATP Tour
- WTA Tour (Blocked In Denmark)
- Davis Cup
- The Grand Slam tournament Wimbledon. (Blocked In Denmark)
