= List of programs broadcast by Canal 9 Norway =

List of programs broadcast by Canal 9

== 0–9 ==
Original title	Country	Norwegian title	Genre
30 Rock	USA		Comedy

== A ==
Original title	Country	Norwegian title	Genre
ALF	USA		Sitcom
'Allo 'Allo!	GBR		Sitcom

== B ==
Original title	Country	Norwegian title	Genre
Beach Patrol	USA		Documentary
Blackadder	GBR	Sorte Orm	Sitcom
The Bold and the Beautiful	USA	Glamour	Soap opera

== C ==
Original title	Country	Norwegian title	Genre
Columbo	USA		Crime drama
Creature Comforts	USA		Animation

== F ==
Original title	Country	Norwegian title	Genre
The First 48	USA		Documentary

== G ==
Original title	Country	Norwegian title	Genre
Gator 911	USA		Documentary
Ghost Adventures	USA	Finnes det spøkelser?	Paranormal

== H ==
Original title	Country	Norwegian title	Genre
Highway Patrol	AUS		Documentary

== I ==
Original title	Country	Norwegian title	Genre
I Survived...	USA		Documentary
Ice Pilots NWT	CAN	Ice Pilots	Documentary
ICU A Matter of Life and Death	AUS		Documentary
Interpol Investigates	USA		Documentary
Intervention	USA	Oppdrag: Misbruk	Documentary

== L ==
Original title	Country	Norwegian title	Genre
Last Comic Standing	USA		Talent show
The Librarians	AUS		Sitcom
Life's Funniest Moments	USA		Entertainment

== M ==
Original title	Country	Norwegian title	Genre
Miami Vice	USA		Crime drama
Monty Python's Personal Best	USA GBR		Comedy
Murder, She Wrote	USA	Jessica Fletcher	Crime drama

== P ==
Original title	Country	Norwegian title	Genre
The Persuaders!	UK	Gullguttene	Action adventure
Plastic Surgery Before and After	USA	Plastisk kirurgi før og etter	Documentary

== U ==
Original title	Country	Norwegian title	Genre
The Ultimate Fighter	USA		Reality TV

== V ==
Original title	Country	Norwegian title	Genre
V (1983)	USA		Science fiction
V (1984)	USA		Science fiction

== z ==
Original title	Country	Norwegian title	Genre
Zorro	USA		Adventure
