= List of Highway Patrol (Australian TV series) episodes =

The following is a list of episodes for the Australian factual television series Highway Patrol.

As of 3 April 2023, 12 seasons of the program have aired plus eight compilation specials, totaling 118 episodes.

== Series overview ==
Series	Episodes	Originally released	
Series	Episodes	First released	Last released
1	10	21 September 2009	23 November 2009
2	10	30 June 2010	27 July 2011
3	10	9 February 2012	7 May 2012
4	9	3 October 2012	21 November 2012
5	12	1 May 2013	25 November 2013
6	9	8 July 2014	17 November 2014
7	10	24 June 2015	31 August 2015
8	10	4 July 2016	9 November 2016
9	10	17 July 2017	22 October 2017
10	10	1 August 2018	12 September 2018
11	10	26 August 2019	25 March 2020
12	10	27 March 2023	26 March 2024
13	10	31 October 2024	14 April 2025
14	TBA	4 February 2026	TBA
S	8	10 June 2010	12 August 2020

== Episodes ==
=== Season 1 (2009) ===
No. overall	No. in season	Title	Original release date	Australia viewers (millions)
1	1	"Hells Angel"	21 September 2009	1.70
Buckle up and get ready to experience first hand the fast-paced, breakneck world of Australia's Traffic Police. For the first time, viewers will get a rare glimpse into the day-to-day lives of the officers who take on two types of dangerous offenders – the criminal and their vehicle. In this episode, a drunk Hells Angel driver has caused mayhem in one of the streets of Melbourne's Middle Park and is taken to a police station to sober up after refusing a breath analysis; a speeding unlicensed driver initially lies to police about who he is, but eventually comes clean at a police station; and officer Megan de Winne catches up with a repeat unlicensed driving offender when the offender does a runner.
2	2	"Drug Family"	28 September 2009	1.57
When an unlicensed driver is questioned, the situation gets tense and a scuffle breaks out. Elsewhere, a driver is seen by officers talking on her mobile phone but when they pull her over she denies being on the phone, and a young female driver has been spotted traveling at 151 km/h on the Calder highway.
3	3	"Rider On The Run"	5 October 2009	1.30
Leading Senior Constable Dave Winton is on a high-speed motorbike chase. Elsewhere, officers impound a car using the new hoon legislation, caution a young lady for not displaying P Plates, and deal with a high-range driver who has had too much to drink.
4	4	"Flipping Idiots"	12 October 2009	1.37
Officer Alasdair Farrell and Officer Ash Bowden are called to a local park after reports of honing. On arrival they find a car on its roof with debris strewn all around, but there is no sign of the occupants. Elsewhere, a local mechanic seeks attention the wrong way.
5	5	"Drug Mule"	19 October 2009	1.35
Officer Megan De Winne recognises a red car and pulls it over for a routine check. Elsewhere, someone reports nearly being run over by a drunk driver, a driver is pulled over for doing 130 km/h in a 110 km/h zone and a truck driver with an attitude is caught running a red light.
6	6	"Unlicensed and Unrestrained"	26 October 2009	1.29
Officer Megan De Winne pulls over an unlicensed driver with an unrestrained toddler in the back seat. Elsewhere, a driver who is using borrowed number plates discovers they are in fact stolen and a driver in a stunning Maserati is busted on the phone.
7	7	"Hidden Needles"	2 November 2009	1.24
Senior Constable Brad Mascoll narrowly misses being pricked by needles while he is searching a car. Meanwhile a police officer calls for backup in a dark alleyway, a car is seen running a red light and then smashing straight into another car and a highly strung young youth gets lippy with Senior Constable Megan De Winne.
8	8	"Hellraising Driver"	9 November 2009	1.22
Leading Senior Constable Ivan Bosnjak clocks a car doing 148 km/h in an 80 km/h zone and during a high-speed pursuit the driver rams the police car. Elsewhere, officers pull over a speeding driver with no headlights, slow down a speeding driver who is in a rush for soccer practice and a P-Plater has an unusual reason for not displaying his plates.
9	9	"Drunk and Pregnant"	16 November 2009	1.21
Officers at a Booze Bus operation encounter a pregnant woman so drunk she can barely walk getting out from the driver's seat. Elsewhere, speed checks reveal a car doing 130 km/h in a 60 km/h zone, a driver busted doing doughnuts does the runner and two brothers face the wrath of Officer Megan de Winne.
10	10	"Season Finale"	23 November 2009	1.31
Senior Constable Pete Henry is called to the scene of an accident where a driver has smashed into a power pole. Elsewhere, a young driver is clocked doing 62 km/h over the speed limit, a female driver accidentally hits an elderly man and an automatic number plate recognition system gets a hit with an unregistered car.

=== Season 2 (2010–11) ===
No. overall	No. in season	Title	Original release date	Australia viewers (millions)
11	1	"Psycho Truck Driver"	30 June 2010	1.21
A roadside burger stop becomes a showdown. Police catch a male driving "al fresco".
12	2	"Mad Rider (New Title)"	26 July 2010	1.16
A motorcyclist's attempt to out-run police goes very wrong. An officer gets angry at a driver for almost hitting another officer by speeding through a random breath testing block. Officers are called to a scene where a man pulled out a knife in a bus. When an officer pulls a driver over for not wearing a seat belt, he receives an indecent proposal from the passenger.
13	3	"Rainstorm Crash (New Title)"	20 October 2010	0.72
...
14	4	"Taxi Theft"	27 October 2010	0.71
A taxi passenger tries to avoid paying the fare by stealing the taxi, leaving the driver stranded roadside.
15	5	"Racy Rider"	22 June 2011	0.97
A biker tries to outrun Melbourne HWP on his 929 Fireblade with fake plates. Pretends to pull over but does a U-turn onto tram tracks and guns it. Police are waiting for him to come home where he is arrested at the police station.
16	6	"Car Full of Kids"	29 June 2011	1.02
A very young driver catches the eye of Senior Constable Nathan Ractliffe and it turns out everyone in the car is between 12 and 15, including the driver.
17	7	"Hash 'N' Dash (New Title)"	6 July 2011	0.92
Officer Terry Moore catches a speeding driver who is carrying marijuana, while a truck driver from Sydney has got lost on the Melbourne freeway and got stuck in a median strip after illegally taking a U-turn with his massive truck and trailer. And two adults smoking in a car with a child inside catches the eye of Senior Constable Ash Bowden.
18	8	"Drunk Grandmother (New Title)"	13 July 2011	0.94
A breath testing unit experience a weird night on the roads under a full moon. A car with a painting of Heath Ledger on its bonnet catches the eye of the police – again. Is an innocent grandmother who is pulled over for speeding trying to hide something from police?
19	9	"Speed Drink Suspended"	20 July 2011	0.94
...
20	10	"Stole Mum's Car"	27 July 2011	1.00
...

=== Season 3 (2012) ===
No. overall	No. in season	Title	Original release date	Australia viewers (millions)
21	1	"Superman"	9 February 2012	N/A
2 bikes take off from the lights in different directions and Senior Constable Ryan Burns picks the faster bike and gives chase. The rider crashes at high speed but amazingly gets up and takes off on foot. Ryan gives chase. A few streets away the rider gives up. At first the rider says he fled because he panicked but a better reason turns up in the rider’s jacket; a bag of cannabis. Officer Ash Bowden spots a woman using her mobile phone but she denies having a phone in her car. What to do? Ash searches the car but there is no sign of the phone. After the woman drives off Ash’s partner calls her phone and she answers! Senior Constable Kirstie Sorlie is called to a dispute between a female and a male motorist who each claims the other was cutting them off and yelling/ swearing/ insulting each other and calling each other un-Australian. It is his word against hers. Kristi just tells them to leave. Senior Constable Christine Boseley is doing random breath tests on the side of the road. A work truck with an expired registration catches her eye. Turns out it is the boss' car and there are 4 passengers, all rowdy funny young guys. The trailer also has unroadworthy tyres.
22	2	"Drunk Parking"	16 February 2012	N/A
An officer sees a poorly parked car at a shopping centre but the man behind the wheel claims he was not driving and "just waiting for a mate".
23	3	"Lamp Post"	23 February 2012	N/A
Senior Constable McCrann is called to find a driver who has crashed and fled the scene; Once found, the driver admits he has had too much to drink. Senior Constable Ryan Burns catches a driver running a red light on the Princes Highway, Dave Sweeney gets a bird flipped at him while looking for a spot to have lunch.
24	4	"Motorcycle Crash"	1 March 2012	N/A
Senior Constable Mark Rose is called to an accident on the Westgate Freeway, where a motorcycle rider has tried to split the traffic and go between two trucks. The rider has been run over by one of the trucks. Two witnesses have stopped but the truck drivers did not and it is presumed that they are unaware of the accident. The rider is taken to hospital but dies on the way. The police are treating the accident as a hit and run until they can find the trucks involved. When Senior Constable Ryan Byrns tries to pull over an unregistered car the driver decides to run … but he does not get very far at all, not realizing that he is being followed by not one, but two patrol cars. A young speeder refuses to admit to driving well over the speed limit and Leading Senior Constables Heather Allen and Andy Trace are subjected to his ill informed rants about the law.
25	5	"Sleazeball"	8 March 2012	N/A
A man is caught speeding at 126 km/h in an 80 zone, in an unregistered car with the wrong number plates. But his biggest worry is getting the woman he is out with home before her boyfriend finds out.
26	6	"Mute Driver"	15 March 2012	N/A
Sergeants pull over a driver for failing to put on his headlights, but the driver takes a vow of silence on the advice of his passenger and refuses to say anything to the Police. A Senior Constable pulls over a car that is being driven erratically and runs a red light. Then, two Senior Constables pull over a driver traveling 54 km/h over the speed limit. The Constables follow him while he weaves in and out of traffic. Once they pull him over his excuse is that he was speeding to get to the bathroom.
27	7	"Get Off The Bridge"	22 March 2012	N/A
Senior Constables are called to a car with a flat tyre on the bridge. But their attempts to clear the bridge are hampered by a stubborn lollipop man. Senior Constable Kate Fisher spots a driver she is pulled over many times, this time on the phone, and he attempts to continue driving on a suspended licence. Senior Constable Terry Moore is in a marked police car when a driver screams out of a side street in front of him. But the driving is not the worst offence this man commits tonight as Terry discovers when he opens the boot of the man's car.
28	8	"Head-On"	29 March 2012	N/A
officers race to the scene of a head-on collision, meet a driver who is way over the limit, and find out a whole new meaning to the term 'road rage'.
29	9	"Bendigo Head-On"	7 May 2012	0.66
A high speed collision has left several people trapped in both cars with really bad injuries. They are airlifted to hospital and it takes some time to work out the events from the chaos of the crash scene. A driver is discovered speeding at 111 km/h in a 70 km/h zone. He is so drunk though that he cannot produce a breath test. After another driver is caught speeding, he is so furious that he speeds off from the police.
30	10	"Sister Act"	7 May 2012	0.82
Nathan Ratcliffe pulls over a driver in Whyndam for driving erratically, checks reveal the driver is suspended from driving and the driver is not happy with what is going to happen to him. Ash Bowden pulls over a car using the number plate recognition technology as the owner of that car only has a Learners permit and nobody is in the front seat, the driver uses her sister's name to try and get out of getting into trouble. Mick McCrann patrols Bendigo pulls over a driver who has stalled an old Commodore, he then also arrests a reveler for being drunk in a public place after a fight breaks out.

=== Season 4 (2012) ===
No. overall	No. in season	Title	Original release date	Australia viewers (millions)
31	1	"Stolen Getaway Car"	3 October 2012	0.97
A driver who has managed to crash his car into a garden swears he was driving safely and the car just veered out of control. The police have to call off a high speed chase of a stolen car for the safety of the officers. The car ends up being found though dumped with all sorts of evidence left behind.
32	2	"Doped Driver"	10 October 2012	0.98
Some random breath testing ends up proving quite interesting for officers. The police break up a roadside drinking session, and some black smoke signals cause a lot of problems with a mechanic's car.
33	3	"Asserting My Rights"	17 October 2012	1.05
A cyclist decides to do a wheelie right in front of an unmarked police car driven by Jackie Loveday and attempts to evade the police before falling off his bike but he continues to try to make a run for it. A car is pulled over by Senior Constables Mick McCrann and Bruce Slimmin because the passenger does not want to wear his seatbelt and he is asserting his rights, a rider is clocked doing 110 km/h in a 60 km/h zone by Steve Bull with the rider being in a similar situation 6 weeks before by Jackie Clavell, senior constables Mike Hanney and Danny Saxton pull over a speeding driver and the driver claims to be an expert with radar calibrations by trying to get out of the speeding fine
34	4	"Ghost Plates"	24 October 2012	1.04
A constable intercepts a speeding bike rider on an unroadworthy bike who he has run into before. A senior constable discovers a case she has been looking out for involving ghost plates.
35	5	"SES Rescue"	31 October 2012	1.03
A driver in a horrific crash is trapped in the wreckage which ends up being wrapped around a tree. The highway patrol officers have to coordinate bringing in the rescue helicopters as teams attempt to cut him out. A Senior Constable discovers a group of young partygoers on the streets, and after stopping them from drinking on the streets he sends them on their way. An officer is patrolling the streets of Corio when a bout of road rage happens right in front of him.
36	6	"Stolen Rental"	7 November 2012	0.926
A car runs a red light in front of a Senior Constable and then tries to speed away. A driver is pulled over for speeding, but he cannot accept the facts and contests his ticket for speeding. A car has crashed into a fence, but who was driving?
37	7	"Two Trucks, One Car"	14 November 2012	1.13
Some Senior constables attend a nose-to-tail in peak hour traffic after a car has been sandwiched between two trucks. A senior constable sees a bike speeding and also pulls over an unregistered van that has no number plates.
38	8	"Sandwich Pursuit"	21 November 2012	1.15
As one of the sergeants is checking number plates, a bike with personalised plates comes up as unregistered. He attempts to pull over the bike, but the rider decides to try to get away In Bendigo, a senior constable stops a young speeding driver after the car is going 74 km/h in a 60 km/h zone.
39	9	"Invisible Bike"	20 February 2013	0.594
A senior constable dealing with a P-plater who just cannot stick to the rules. A cheeky cyclist has modified his bike to fit a homemade engine, which sees him breaking the speed limit on the highway. A cold and rainy night leads to a collision between a car and a bike. A senior constable arrives at the scene to find the bike rider on the ground and not breathing, and he immediately he attends to the rider with CPR until the ambulance arrives. Due to the heavy rain and the dark, the driver is not at fault but is clearly shaken by what has happened. Will they be able to save the cyclist, or will this accident end in tragedy?
Unknown	9	"Lucky To Be Alive"	Unknown	Unknown
A young man's decision to do burnouts comes to a terrible conclusion when he crashes into a power pole. A woman pulled over for speeding lies about her name. What is she trying to hide? A Senior Constable pulls over two badly behaved drivers and both have a million and one excuses for breaking the law.

=== Season 5 (2013) ===
No. overall	No. in season	Title	Original release date	Australia viewers (millions)
40	1	"Inches From Death"	1 May 2013	0.919
Senior Constable Dean Pickering attempts to help at the scene of a serious crash where two kids have stolen a car and later wrapped the car around a tree. A driver is stopped in Epping for driving an unregistered car.
41	2	"Spiked Pursuit"	8 May 2013	0.988
The police attempt to apprehend a female drink driver who has crashed a booze bus site.
42	3	"Knife Attack"	12 May 2013	0.904
Whilst on his way home from work, a member of the public is attacked by a man with a knife. The offender leads police on a frantic foot chase through the streets of Maribyrnong.
43	4	"Street Revolt"	26 May 2013	0.962
Things end up getting well out of control after a group of men gather to mourn their dead friend. A mother's efforts to teach her daughter to drive goes horribly wrong after the teenager crashes through the side of a house. A P-plater caught behind the wheel of a Turbo berates police for pursuing him and informing him he'll lose his licence.
44	5	"Blackout In Bendigo"	2 June 2013	0.953
When a sergeant stops a car, his partner notices a weapon in the car. Two senior constables attempt to deal with a speeding car with bald tyres and a toddler sitting in the passenger footwell.
45	6	"Australia's Angriest Man"	23 June 2013	1.26
A traffic cop is given a hard time but after Senior Constable Russell Warner stops a driver, he gets a reaction like none other he is seen before. Senior Constable Jerome Murnane stops a car with a couple of stoned occupants inside. Mick McCrann spots a hazard in the dark on Bendigos main drag but a car gets his attention every time it drove past him with the throttle going, what will happen?
46	7	"Unrestrained Rage"	8 July 2013	0.951
A traffic stop goes horribly wrong after a furious driver tries to attack the police.
47	8	"Dicing With Death"	15 July 2013	0.919
Senior Constable Dean Pickering is not a happy man after he sees three carloads of teenagers racing each other and even worse, climbing out of their vehicles at great speed.
48	9	"Smash And Dash"	4 November 2013	0.871
A man ends up leaving the scene of a crash and after police officers manage to find him, it becomes obvious why he wanted to get away. The police manage to spot a car with stolen plates on it.
49	10	"Drunk And Angry"	11 November 2013	1.00
Some officers find themselves on the end of a drunk man's fury after he is pulled over and he is not afraid to let the police know just how dangerous he can be.
50	11	"Car Crash Carnage"	18 November 2013	1.02
Some officers attend the scene of a car crash with a heavily pregnant victim involved. Senior constables witness a speeder.

=== Season 6 (2014) ===
No. overall	No. in season	Title	Original release date	Australia viewers (millions)
51	1	"Argy Bargy"	25 November 2013	1.11
A man is trapped inside his vehicle when it smashes into a pole with fears of electrocution. Then, two drivers ignore a Constable's attempt to pull them over and a minor collision turns into a major argument.
52	2	"Happy Wife, Happy Life"	8 July 2014	768,000 (Note: Average of episode 1 and 2 airing back-to-back.)
When a man is suspected of driving under the influence of drugs, the fine and his job are the least of his worries after his partner finds out.
53	3	"Drug Driving"	8 July 2014	768,000
If you drive a hoon-mobile, expect to be pulled over. But it is what happens next that is unexpected.
54	4	"Mutinous Mother"	16 July 2014	903,000
Officers are furious when a woman in an unregistered car deliberately disobeys him and drives off. A man gets aggressive after being pulled over for talking on a mobile phone. Officers arrive at the scene of a bad accident but the driver is gone.
55	5	"Speed, Lies & Alibis"	21 July 2014	778,000
Officers pull over a female driver who was caught racing at a dangerously high speed. But when she blatantly lies about what she has been doing, she is in for a big shock. A truck loses its load on a busy road and an angry driver denies using his mobile phone.
56	6	"Tazer Blazer"	28 July 2014	695,000
57	7	"Roadside Rumble"	6 August 2014	865,000
58	8	"Brazen Burnout"	10 August 2014	642,000
59	9	"Van Full of Trouble"	10 November 2014	771,000
Constables are horrified when they spot a van full of unrestrained children. The potential for carnage is enormous, but the mother seems more concerned about her brand new phone. Officers get a sense of deja vu when they stop a driver with fake license plates. Then Constables have a strange experience with a runaway couch!
60	10	"Stop"	17 November 2014	785,000
Scott Woodford with a hoon on the road and a repeat drunk driver who keeps changing his mind to either go to the police station or incur a fine. Then, Constable Ash South spots a car with no license plates but as he gives chase, the driver does a runner! Heather Allen runs a check on a car owned by someone who has had extensive contact with Police. Russell Warner pulls over an unregistered car and has difficulty understanding language barrier from the driver.

=== Season 7 (2015) ===
No. overall	No. in season	Title	Original release date	Australia viewers (millions)
61	1	"Missing Driver Mystery"	24 June 2015	833,000
When officers catch a taxi driver blatantly running a red light, it sets off a chain of events that has to be seen to be believed. A driver caught on his mobile is determined to argue the point. Police pull over a suspended driver driving his mother's car, and a self-assessment that is bang on with a young female driving an unregistered vehicle.
62	2	"You Can Run"	1 July 2015	735,000
Officers spot a car going at warp speed and when the driver shows no sign of stopping, it becomes a full-blown pursuit. Police are baffled when they pull over a driver who insists he is a UFO. A driver goes ballistic when he is caught driving his unregistered car.
63	3	"Drunk Love Affair"	8 July 2015	650,000
An officer pulls over an intoxicated driver whose passenger cannot get enough of him. Police deal with two agro men who have been caught street racing and get a laugh from a man on a souped up cycle.
64	4	"Un-Australian"	15 July 2015	752,000
A massive roadside stoush unfolds when officers stop a man who has not installed his interlock device. A dodgy looking car leads officers on a pursuit at high speed through the crowded streets of Yarra.
65	5	"Drunk Disaster"	22 July 2015	718,000
A drunk woman makes the worst decision of her life when she decides to get in her car and fetch takeaways. A motorbike rider risks a dangerous maneuver on the road and officers comes across two guys you’d never want to come to your roadside rescue.
66	6	"Ghost Rider"	27 July 2015	590,000
Police spot two motorcyclists racing each other on the streets of Epping. One pulls over but the other does a runner. A driver gets belligerent over the amount of trouble he is in and complains about his truck getting impounded. When members of the Highway Patrol set up a covert sting, it causes chaos.
67	7	"Liar Liar Pants On Fire"	10 August 2015	789,000
An officer pulls over an aggressive P Plater who was caught on her mobile phone and denies everything. An elderly woman’s driving lesson goes horribly wrong when she panics and hits the accelerator.
68	8	"Eskypades"	17 August 2015	837,000
When officers pull over a driver, they are greeted with a barrage of swearing and aggression. A young couple’s holiday gets off to a scary start when they lose control of their car.
69	9	"Yes, No, Maybe"	24 August 2015	872,000
An officer's patience is tested well beyond his limits when he catches an extremely drunk driver. A driver going hellishly fast smashes into a young woman then does a runner from the scene. Officers meet a man who has made up his own road rules.
70	10	"Give It A Rest"	31 August 2015	945,000
When members of the Yarra Ranges Highway Patrol set up a covert sting, it causes them more drama than they bargained. Cops' attempt to pull over a suspended motorbike rider turns into a road affair when two rubberneckers are involved in a crash, and a hooner's car is defected. All hell breaks loose when police attempt to pull over a speeding driver.

=== Season 8 (2016) ===
No. overall	No. in season	Title	Original release date	Australia viewers (millions)
71	1	"Witches, Wizards and Pots of Gold"	4 July 2016	736,000
Police attempt to confirm the identity of a speeding driver when he is unable to produce a licence, a man claims police will owe him three pots of gold if they charge him with using a mobile phone while driving and police find a vehicle with a remote controlled number plate cover.
72	2	"You Guys are the Worst!"	4 July 2016	758,000
A cyclist with a strong dislike of the highway patrol refuses to wear his helmet and police find a large amount of cash inside a vehicle.
73	3	"Smashing, Running and Rescuing!"	11 July 2016	823,000
A driver in possession of a crowbar is told his vehicle will be impounded by police.
74	4	"Look What's In The Garden"	18 July 2016	740,000
Senior Constable Dave England is first on the scene at a house fire, police pull over a man doing more than twice the speed limit on a suburban street and find a bag of drugs near his vehicle, and a probationary licence holder is found behind the wheel of a vehicle he is unallowed to be driving.
75	5	"What's The Emergency"	25 July 2016	763,000
A driver speeding through the streets of a local residential area is caught, police attend a multi-vehicle accident on a freeway and a driver is not happy to learn his car has been flagged as unregistered.
76	6	"Never Lie To A Cop"	1 August 2016	801,000
A man with a bad temper is pulled over, offensive stickers on a brightly coloured vehicle gets officers attention, and police attempt to confirm the identity of a driver who is in a hurry to leave the scene of a motor vehicle accident.
77	7	"Drop Ya Pants!"	19 October 2016	660,000
A driver enters a rage when police pull him over for driving an unregistered vehicle, and officers discover a driver unaccompanied while displaying learner plates.
78	8	"Bikers Beware!"	26 October 2016	658,000
A suspended driver doing an illegal U-turn knocks over a motorcyclist who it turns out is also unlicensed, a second motorcyclist caught speeding without a helmet is found not to hold a licence, and a driver refuses to take a drug test.
79	9	"He's A Stalker!"	2 November 2016	742,000
A female driver accuses Ash Bowden of stalking her when she learns her car will be impounded because her licence has been suspended multiple times, an elderly motorcyclist not wearing a helmet is pulled over, two tradies are stopped on their way to work, and a vehicle without licence plates is caught speeding at 129 km/h in an 80 km/h zone.
80	10	"Running from the Cops!"	9 November 2016	727,000
A vehicle acting oddly speeds off when officers attempt to pull it over, an unlicensed driver is found behind the wheel of his friend's car which police plan to impound, and a man insists he was not using a phone behind the wheel.

=== Season 9 (2017) ===
No. overall	No. in season	Title	Original release date	Australia viewers (millions)
81	1	"Rent A Quote"	17 July 2017	572,000
A driver caught using his phone begins a foul-mouthed tirade, officers respond to a crash where witnesses claim the vehicle was doing burnouts, and a woman with improperly restrained children is drug tested.
82	2	"Road Rampage"	24 July 2017	556,000
Officers pull over a van driver not wearing a seatbelt, a trailer carrying pigs turns out to be unregistered, and police pursue a vehicle driving at dangerous speed as the driver attempts to evade them.
83	3	"Truck Vs Car"	31 July 2017	429,000
An SUV crashes head on into a truck with dashcam capturing the dramatic moment, police pull over a turbo charged vehicle displaying P-plates, and officers respond to an embarrassed Ferrari which has run out of petrol on busy Chapel Street.
84	4	"Dangerous Daydreamer"	11 September 2017	612,000
Senior Constable Ash Bowden gives a speeding daydreamer an earful, officers spot a woman using her phone behind the wheel on a freeway, and police pull over a woman who has her car packed dangerously with furniture.
85	5	"Liar, Liar"	18 September 2017	616,000
A clearly intoxicated woman can hardly stand after being pulled over, a truck driver is pursued for not wearing a seatbelt before running an amber light in front of officers, and police are called to a motorcycle crash.
86	6	"Drunk Off Roading"	25 September 2017 (Note: The episode did not debut in Melbourne or Adelaide on this date due to other programming in these cities.)	376,000
Officers respond to a bizarre off roading crash with a trail of destruction across hundreds of metres, police impound the car of a serial offender, and a driver studying to become a police officer is caught more than 20km/h over speed.
87	7	"This is Embarrassing!"	2 October 2017	457,000
A man acts strangely and aggressively after being pulled over for vehicle defects, police hunt down an unregistered vehicle with a suspended driver behind the wheel, and officers impound a man's car who is a repeat offender for driving while suspended.
88	8	"Mono Mania"	9 October 2017	593,000
Officers stop a motorcycle after the rider pulls a mono in front of them, a motorists fails a drug test, and a suspended driver is caught doing 104km/h in a 60km/h zone as well as smoking with a child in the car.
89	9	"Burnout!"	15 October 2017	622,000
A suspended driver is caught doing a burnout in front of officers, officers have trouble identifying a suspended driver who cannot recall his address, and police detect a vehicle using stolen licence plates.
90	10	"Car on Fire"	22 October 2017 (Note: The episode did not debut in Perth on this date due to Perth Telethon.)	495,000
Officers come across a vehicle engulfed in flames on the side of a freeway, a driver is pulled over after being caught at more than double the speed limit in a school zone, and police are called to the scene of an accident involving a car colliding with a tree.

=== Season 10 (2018) ===
No. overall	No. in season	Title	Original release date	Australia viewers (millions)
91	1	"Slowest Getaway"	1 August 2018	582,000
When a car crashes a stop sign while trying to run from police, it hurtles head-on into the path of a bus. The driver has plenty of reasons to run - but will he avoid a serious smash?
92	2	"Brand New Car"	1 August 2018	657,000
Officers Damien O'Brien and Steve Mottram come across a woman who prefers her dog to ride shotgun, rather than her boyfriend. Also, Sergeant Ash Hodges nails a man in a hurry to get to a family lunch.
93	3	"Australia's Biggest Bogan"	8 August 2018	578,000
When police pull over a car for being too low, they meet a man who reckons he is Australia's biggest bogan. And with a range of bad tattoos and a penchant for cigarettes and cars, he may be right.
94	4	"Taking a Dive"	8 August 2018	622,000
A learner bursts into tears when he is caught without a fully licensed driver beside him. To add insult to injury, he then follows it up with a full-blown, toddler-like tantrum.
95	5	"Mr Vomit Man"	15 August 2018	601,000
Drunk drivers are all too common but the man leading Senior Constable Rob Jones pulls over is beyond belief. He is so off his face, he vomits all over his car - and partly down himself.
96	6	"A Cat and a Hat"	15 August 2018	631,000
Take a man, a cat and a funny hat and what do you get? Unfortunately, as Leading Senior Constable Pete Henry discovers, anything but a child's bedtime story.
97	7	"Troublesome Tradies"	22 August 2018	543,000
Three tradies lose their cool when Senior Constable Brown impounds their Ute. But they're not the only ones to lose their ride - a man who lies about his ID also loses his vehicle to a tow truck.
98	8	"Donut King"	29 August 2018	511,000
Sergeant Trevor Poulton witnesses the biggest burnout of his career when a car suddenly lays down rubber right in front of him.
99	9	"Two For The Price Of One"	5 September 2018	N/A
Combine a pub with two lawbreakers and it is double the trouble for officers Oakley and Zeffert. A motorbike rider tries an unorthodox escape and it is soon clear why he is running from the cops.
100	10	"You Should Buy Me a Slab"	12 September 2018	N/A
George likes a traveler between work and home but when he gets pulled over by the cops, they find dozens of empty tinnies in his footwell. So will he pass his breath test?

=== Season 11 (2019-20) ===
No. overall	No. in season	Title	Original release date	Australia viewers (millions)
101	1	"Motorbike Mayhem"	26 August 2019	506,000
Officers Rob Jones and Matt Moohan spot a couple of motorbikes going at breakneck speed. One rider makes a dramatic getaway, nearly crashing in the process. The other rider also does a runner but reckons without the cops getting a good look at both his registration and his face.
102	2	"Burning Rubber"	2 September 2019	492,000
A dramatic chase gets underway in the western suburbs of Melbourne when a woman fails to stop for police.
103	3	"Crusher!"	9 September 2019	499,000
A driver who has lost his licence multiple times goes on a mad driving rampage in Western Melbourne. He is not too fazed about getting his car impounded but what he does not realise is that Sergeant Andy Oakley has another punishment in store altogether.
104	4	"Diarrhoea Disaster"	16 September 2019	536,000
A man’s desperate dash for the dunny because of diarrhea nearly ends in disaster when he is caught by officers Andy Oakley and Rob Jones.
105	5	"Get On The Ground"	16 October 2019	423,000
A man with a warrant for his arrest is on the run from police when he is suddenly spotted by the Highway Patrol. What follows next is a high speed chase, as the cops try and nail him on foot.
106	6	"Liar, Liar"	23 October 2019	411,000
When a car runs a red and hits another vehicle, the driver takes off from the scene. A woman and her son turn up, claiming she was behind the wheel. But every eyewitness says otherwise.
107	7	"Stolen Getaway"	30 October 2019	446,000
Officers Dave England and Ash Lane are patrolling when they come across a stolen car. When they try and stop it, the driver smashes into a parked car and makes a getaway, but has he gone for good?
108	8	"Don’t Suck, Blow!"	6 November 2019	490,000
Officers Brian West and Peter Shrimpton are in for the most frustrating night of their life when they meet a drunk woman who is confused by how to use the breathalyser.
109	9	"Concrete Heads"	18 March 2020	388,000
A group of tradies go ballistic when they are caught without seatbelts and with an unsafe load. Then, a motorcyclist carries on when his attempt to run from police is horribly unsuccessful.
110	10	"Do As I Say, Not As I Do."	25 March 2020	Not In Top 20 Shows
A man whose vehicle is plastered with safety messages tries to pull off a dangerous maneuver right in front of the Highway Patrol.

=== Season 12 (2023-24) ===
No. overall	No. in season	Title	Original release date	Australia viewers (millions)

=== Season 13 (2024-25) ===
No. overall	No. in season	Title	Original release date	Australia viewers (millions)

=== Season 14 (2026- ) ===
No. overall	No. in season	Title	Original release date	Australia viewers (millions)

=== Highway Patrol Specials ===
In 2014, two compilation specials aired, featuring scenes from previous seasons. Note that the first special debuted in NSW & QLD only initially, before being aired on 14 October 2015 nationally.

No. overall	No. in season	Title	Original release date	Australia viewers (millions)
1	1	"Hoon Riot"	30 June 2010	N/A
2	2	"Outrageous Characters"	22 September 2014	502,000
3	3	"Worst Drivers"	9 October 2014	828,000
4	4	"Craziest Encounters"	31 July 2019	534,000
5	5	"Drivers Behaving Badly"	7 August 2019	439,000
With over a decade on our screens, HIGHWAY PATROL has had more than its share of badly behaved drivers. From the drunk and abusive to the romantic and frantic, the hardworking men and women of Victoria’s Highway Patrol have seen them all.
6	6	"The Cops Tell All"	1 April 2020	462,000
We talk to our most famous faces about what goes on behind the scenes of our most colourful cases. From the outrageous to the downright dumb, officers tell all.
7	7	"Wayward Women"	5 August 2020	462,000
8	8	"Reckless and Rowdy"	12 August 2020	N/A

== See also ==
- Highway Patrol
