= Mike King (advocate) =

New Zealand mental health advocate, television personality, and former comedian

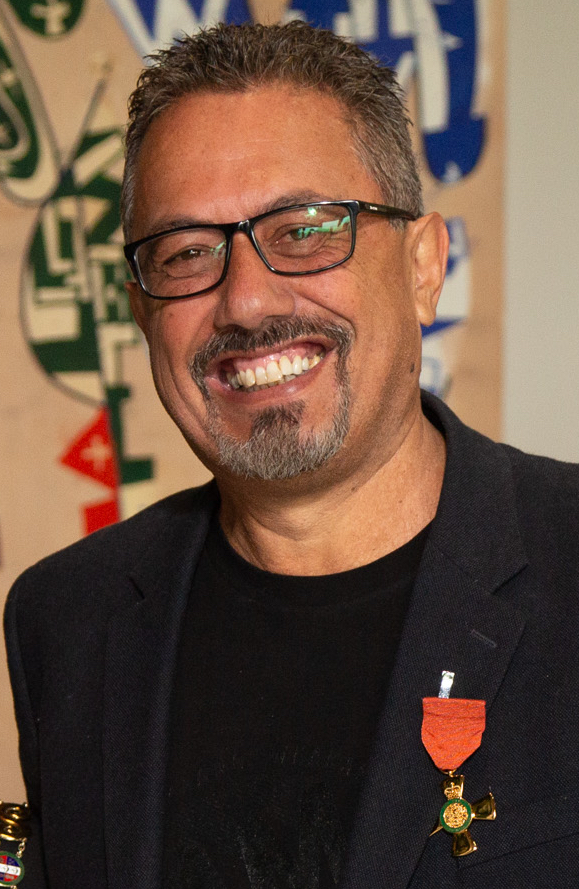
- King wearing the insignia of an ONZM in 2019, an award that he returned in 2021
- Born: Michael King; 12 April 1962 (age 64)
- Education: Massey High School (1974–1977)
- Alma mater: Auckland Technical Institute (1978–1981)
- Occupations: Advocate, television personality
- Years active: 1997–present
- Organization: I Am Hope Foundation (formerly Key to Life Charitable Trust)
- Spouse: Joanna King (m. 2015–present)
- Children: 6
- Awards: New Zealander of the Year (2019)

Michael King (born 12 April 1962) is a New Zealand mental health advocate, television personality, and former comedian.

King's television career began in 1997 with his debut in the New Zealand comedy show Pulp Comedy. Before television, King worked as a stand-up comedian. He was voted comedian of the year in 1997 by Metro magazine readers and nominated for the Billy T Award in the same year. After his television debut, King began to appear on more prominent New Zealand television comedy shows, notably Comedy Central, Game of Two Halves and Strassman. In 2002 he was nominated twice at the 2002 NZ Television Awards for his stand-up show An Audience With the King. He went on to host Mike King Tonight from 2003. The show aired for only one season.

He is well known for his work on mental health advocacy, which began in 2009 with his radio show, The Nutters Club. It was broadcast on New Zealand's Radio Live and then Newstalk ZB. He founded The Key to Life Charitable Trust, now known as the I Am Hope Foundation, in 2012 which promotes suicide prevention and suicide awareness. King was named New Zealander of the Year in 2019 for his mental health advocacy work. He was appointed an Officer of the New Zealand Order of Merit in 2019 and he returned the honour in 2021 as a protest over the lack of progress in the mental health system.

He is also known in New Zealand as a spokesperson for New Zealand pork, presenting 30-second TV commercials on cooking pork known as Mike's Meals until he disengaged from the pork industry.

== Early life ==
King was born in April 1962 and raised in Whenuapai, New Zealand. He is one of five siblings. King attended Massey High School from 1974 until 1977, and then trained as a chef from 1978 to 1981 at the Auckland Technical Institute in Auckland, New Zealand. Mike King lives in Papatoetoe with his family.

== Career ==
Initially making his name as a stand-up comedian, playing heavily on his Māori origins, he made the move to a more lucrative mainstream audience, appearing on the New Zealand TV shows Comedy Central, Game of Two Halves, Strassman, TV Bloopers and Practical Jokes, Pulp Comedy and Guess Who's Coming to Dinner. In 1997 he was nominated for the prestigious Billy T Award.

In 2003 King starred in his own talk show, Mike King Tonight, which was produced by Greenstone Pictures. The show ran for only one season.

In 2004 he hosted Mike King. Although similar in concept to Mike King Tonight, it was produced by Touchdown Television. It was shot on a smaller stage and no longer included the live band present on Mike King Tonight. It also ran for only one season.

== Health ==
In 2006 he said that he suffered from depression, and took on the role of patron for the Phobic Trust. He provided further details in his 2008 autobiography.

On Jan 14, 2007, King collapsed in a Melbourne hotel and was left momentarily unconscious and partially paralyzed from a blood clot in a blood vessel which burst in the back of his neck, a very rare condition. He was attending a poker championship in Melbourne (a prize he claimed after winning a poker tournament in Auckland, New Zealand). It was not known whether he had a heart attack or stroke. His life was saved by his friend and poker player Richard Lancaster, who found him in a state of paralysis and sent him to Alfred Hospital.

== Addiction and mental health ==
In interviews, King has openly released information surrounding his several-year addiction to the drug cocaine. He claims to have purchased a travel agency to assure himself of access to the drug: "If it ever came to it I could always jump on a plane and put myself up in a hotel for a few days".

In 2009, King started a Radio Live programme airing on Sunday evenings entitled The Nutters Club. On the programme, King works with mental health professionals David Codyre and Malcolm Falconer, and invites listeners to phone in with comments and to share stories or issues which might be troubling them. In 2013, The Nutters Club moved to Newstalk ZB.

In 2012, King established the Key to Life identity through the charitable trust now known as the I Am Hope Foundation. In 2019 King was named New Zealander of the Year. After this, he set up a social media campaign for mental health awareness and launched Gumboot Friday, a programme that funds counselling for young people.

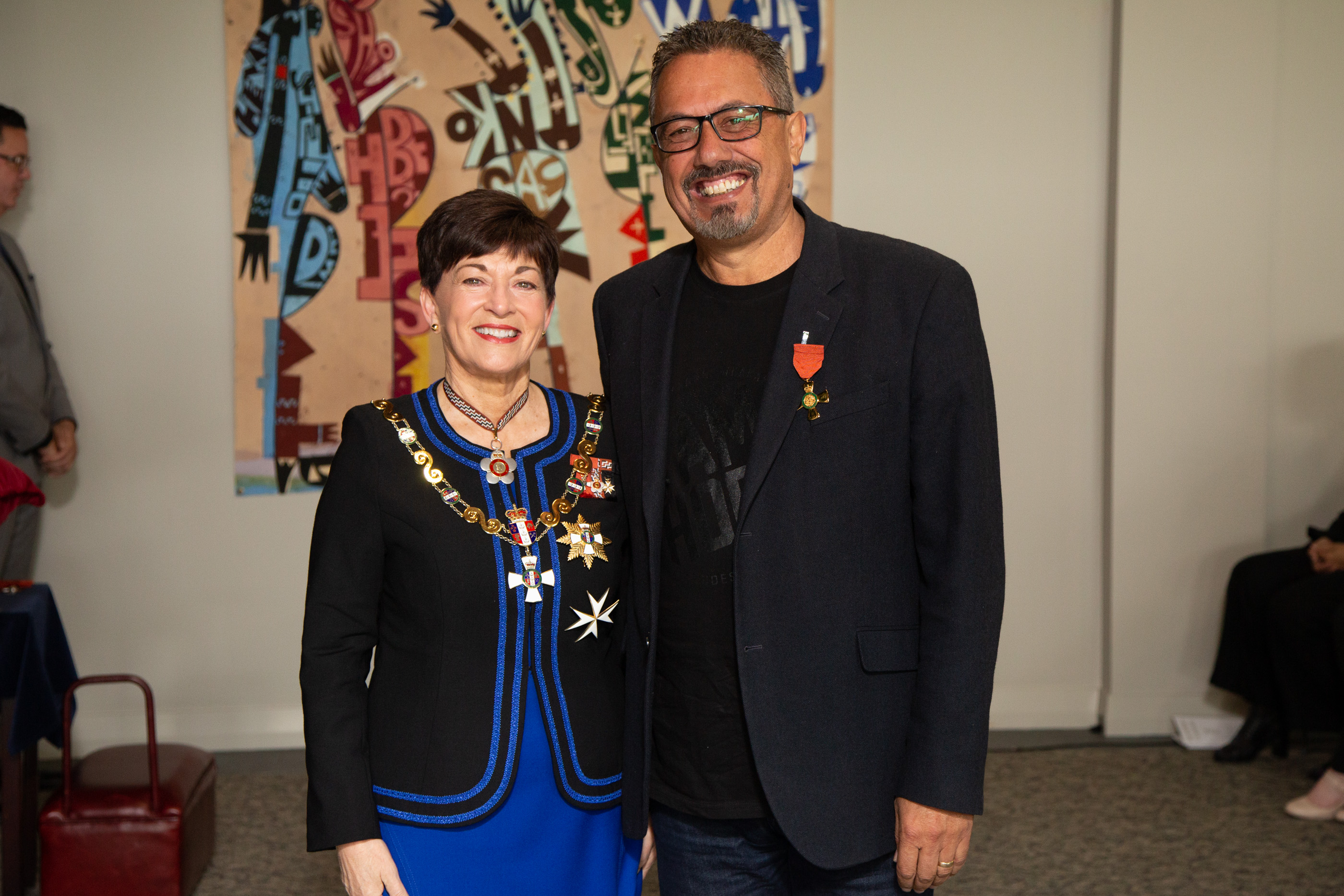
King in 2019, after his investiture as an Officer of the New Zealand Order of Merit by the governor-general, Patsy Reddy

In the 2019 Queen's Birthday Honours, King was appointed an Officer of the New Zealand Order of Merit (ONZM), for services to mental health awareness and suicide prevention. In June 2021, he returned the medal to the government in protest of a lack of progress improving the mental health system, a move he had foreshadowed a month prior. His resignation was accepted by the Queen, who directed that King's appointment as an Officer of the New Zealand Order of Merit be cancelled and annulled.

In May 2024, Deputy Prime Minister Winston Peters and Mental Health Minister Matt Doocey confirmed that the National-led coalition government would invest NZ$24 million in I Am Hope's Gumboot Friday programme providing counselling to young people.

In late October 2024, King attracted controversy after making remarks questioning the link between alcohol and suicide during an interview with Newstalk ZB radio station on 30 October. He said that "alcohol is not a problem for people with mental health issues. It's actually the solution to our problem, until you come up with a better solution. I would suggest to you that alcohol has prevented more young people from taking their own lives than it actually takes their own lives." King added that alcohol had helped with his mental health issues until he received counselling. King's remarks were criticised as "really unhelpful" and dangerous to people with mental health issues by the Mental Health Foundation while the Labour Party called upon the New Zealand Government to cut funding to his Gumboot Friday programme. Mental Health Minister Doocey expressed disagreement with King's remarks while Green Party MP Tamatha Paul said that public figures needed to use their words wisely when talking about the impact of alcohol. By contrast, ACT leader David Seymour minimised the impact of King's remarks, saying he was more worried about the "speech police" capitalising on King's remarks.

In December 2025, the Auditor-General released a favourable report into the Ministry of Health's decision to grant the I Am Hope Foundation $24 million to provide counselling services to people aged between 5 and 25 years over a four-year period, finding that I Am Hope and the Gumboot Friday contract were being managed properly and in accordance with the good practice. The Auditor-General had launched a review of the Government's funding grant in response to Labour MP Ingrid Leary's call for funding to the foundation to be paused in response to remarks by King about alcohol in 2024. Following the report's release, King accused Leary of being obsessed with cutting funding to his foundation and stated that the government grant went directly to counselling sessions for young people.

== Pork marketing ==
Beginning in 2008, King was the spokesman for New Zealand Pork, presenting 30-second TV commercials showcasing quick-fix meals using pork known as Mike's Meals. He dropped out of the campaign after SAFE contacted him about pig farming conditions in New Zealand.

In May 2009, he spoke out against the factory farming of pigs, and apologised for his previous promotional work. Appearing on the Sunday programme, he said "I will not be a party to this brutality, this callous and evil treatment of pigs. It's disgusting and it needs to stop."

== Driving charge ==
In November 2012, King was ordered to complete 200 hours of community work after pleading guilty to a driving charge.

== Filmography ==
=== Television ===
Year	Title	Notes
1996	Pukukata	
1997	Comedy Central	
1997–2001	Pulp Comedy	
1998	Newsflash	
1999–2005	Game of Two Halves	
2000	Project Timor	Television documentary
2000–2003	TV2 Big Comedy Gala	
2000–2002	Strassman	
2001	The Truth about Kiwi Men	Television documentary
2001	An Audience with the King	
2002	Von Tempsky's Ghost	
2002	The Last Laugh	
2002	Blokes: The Kiwi Male Revealed	Television documentary
2003	Mike King Tonight	Host
2003	Mike King's Christmas Special	Host
2004	Mike King	Host
2009	Lost in Translation	Presenter
2010	A Night at the Classic	
2010–present	The Nutters Club	Television and Radio Broadcast
2012	Postcard from Afghanistan with Mike King	
2014	Through the Lens – The First 10 Years of Māori Television	
2014	Happy Hour	
2014	The Last Saint	Film
2018	The AM Show	
2019	Breakfast	
2020	The Project	
2021	Have You Been Paying Attention?^{[47]}	Guest Quiz Master
2022	Celebrity Treasure Island	Intruder (Joined Later In The Game) Left On Day 6

== Books ==
- The Nutters Club (2011) ISBN 9781869794026

== Personal life ==
King has been married since 2015 to Joanna King (née Methven), and they have one daughter: Actress Alex King, who portrays Izzy Dove on Shortland Street.

== Awards and recognitions ==
- 2019 Gladrap Boxing Awards Event of the year (Nominated)
