= Demolition Man (TV series) =

Australian reality television series

- Also known as: Aussie Pickers
- Genre: Reality
- Narrated by: Ben Oxenbould
- Country of origin: Australia
- Original language: English
- No. of seasons: 1
- No. of episodes: 10

Production
- Production company: CJZ

Original release
- Network: A&E
- Release: 21 March 2017 – present

Related
- Aussie Pickers

Demolition Man is an Australian reality television series which premiered on A&E on 21 March 2017.

== Reception ==
The Age wrote: "With a hugely likeable cast and some deft editing to accentuate their organic comedy, Demolition Man is great fun."
