= Desert Collectors =

- Genre: Reality
- Presented by: Nigel Quick and Norm Clarke
- Country of origin: Australia
- Original language: English
- No. of seasons: 3
- No. of episodes: 20

Original release
- Network: A&E
- Release: 9 May 2013 – 30 September 2014

Desert Collectors is an Australian reality television series which premiered on A&E on 12 March 2017.

Desert Collectors Season 1 had its free-to-air premiere on channel 7mate on 9 March 2019. Season 2 debuted on 7mate on 5 May 2020.

== See also ==
- Aussie Pickers
