= Canal 9 (Norwegian TV channel) =

- Country: Norway

Ownership
- Owner: TV4 Group and C More Entertainment

History
- Launched: November 25, 2011
- Closed: 2014

Links
- Website: Official website

Canal 9 was a Norwegian television channel owned by TV4 Group and C More Entertainment.

The channel was designed for men and was launched in November 2011.

== Programs ==
- List of programs broadcast by Canal 9 Norway

== Sports ==
- Football
  - UEFA Euro 2012
  - Serie A
  - UEFA Europa League (From season 2012/13)
- Mixed Martial Arts
  - Ultimate Fighting Championship
  - The Ultimate Fighter
