= I Am Hope Foundation =

New Zealand mental health charity

I Am Hope Foundation is a New Zealand mental health charity associated with the youth counselling initiative Gumboot Friday. The foundation is registered with Charities Services in New Zealand and operates nationally.

The organisation was founded by mental health advocate Mike King. Its Gumboot Friday initiative provides access to counselling for young people in New Zealand.

== History ==
The charity was registered on 19 May 2010. It was originally registered as the Nutters Club NZ Charitable Trust, changed its name to the Key to Life Charitable Trust in 2012, and became I Am Hope Foundation in 2023.

Gumboot Friday was launched in 2019 through I Am Hope as an initiative to connect young people with free counselling services funded through donations.

== Gumboot Friday ==
Gumboot Friday is a counselling service for children and young people in New Zealand. The Ministry of Health has described the service as providing brief intervention counselling for young people aged 5 to 25 who are experiencing mild to moderate mental distress or mental health and addiction concerns.

The Ministry has said that I Am Hope operates an online platform connecting recognised counsellors with young people, who can receive counselling online, by phone, or in some cases face to face.

== Government funding ==
In May 2024, the New Zealand Government announced that Budget 2024 would provide NZ$24 million over four years to contract I Am Hope Foundation to provide free mental health counselling services for young people aged between 5 and 25 through Gumboot Friday. The funding formed part of a coalition agreement commitment between the National Party and New Zealand First.

The Ministry of Health later said Cabinet had approved NZ$24 million over four years, with the Ministry contracting I Am Hope for one year and retaining discretion to renew the contract annually for up to three years in total.

In July 2025, the Ministry of Health released year-one material on the Gumboot Friday initiative. The Ministry said that in the 2024/25 year, 10,192 children and young people received counselling, 30,842 counselling sessions were delivered, and 728 counsellors were registered on the Gumboot Friday platform. The Ministry reported year-one expenditure of NZ$5.172 million.

== Procurement scrutiny ==
The government funding decision attracted scrutiny because the contract was not awarded through an open competitive procurement process. In October 2024, the Auditor-General, John Ryan, wrote to the Ministry of Health about the decision to provide NZ$24 million of public funding over four years to Gumboot Friday/I Am Hope without an open, transparent and competitive procurement process.

The Auditor-General stated that several aspects of the process were unusual and inconsistent with good practice, while also saying the letter did not question the importance of funding early support for young people with mental health concerns, comment on the quality of services provided by I Am Hope, or assess the political coalition agreement itself.

RNZ reported that health officials used an opt-out clause to justify the direct-source contract and that officials had considered scaling up funding more gradually.

In November 2025, the Office of the Auditor-General declined a request to investigate further matters relating to the government funding of I Am Hope. The Office said that, as part of the Ministry of Health's 2024/25 annual audit, it had reviewed the Ministry's management of the contract and found that the contract was being managed appropriately against its terms and in accordance with good practice.

== Leadership ==
Mike King has been described as the founder of I Am Hope Foundation and as executive director and principal ambassador of the organisation. In November 2025, King announced that he would step down from chief executive duties while continuing to play a role in the organisation.

== See also ==
- Mental health in New Zealand
