= MegaTruckers =

- Genre: Reality
- Country of origin: Australia
- Original language: English
- No. of seasons: 1
- No. of episodes: 10

Production
- Production company: Cordell Jigsaw Productions

Original release
- Network: A&E Australia
- Release: 12 November 2012 – 14 January 2013

MegaTruckers is an Australian reality television series which premiered on the A&E channel in 2012. The eight part, 30 minute series is produced by Cordell Jigsaw. It profiles Jon Kelly and the trucking fleet at his Brisbane-based trucking company Heavy Haulage Australia.

== See also ==
- Aussie Pickers
- Outback Truckers
