= The First 48: Missing Persons =

American documentary television series

- Opening title
- Genre: Drama; Action
- Narrated by: Bill Mondy
- Country of origin: United States
- No. of seasons: 2
- No. of episodes: 15

Production
- Executive producers: Gary Sherman; Robert Schneiger; Conrad Riggs
- Running time: 42 minutes (excluding commercials)
- Production company: Found Films

Original release
- Network: A&E
- Release: June 2, 2011 – February 7, 2013

Related
- The First 48; After the First 48; The Killer Speaks

The First 48: Missing Persons is an American documentary television series on A&E that debuted on June 2, 2011 and ended on February 7, 2013.

== Premise ==
The series name comes from the statistic that the odds of solving a case decrease by 50% if a solid lead is not found within the first 48 hours after the person has gone missing. Filmed in Chicago, the series gives an inside look at the real-life cases and procedures of the Chicago Missing Persons Unit. Similar to its predecessor series, The First 48, each episode usually focuses on two cases, beginning with the report of a missing person and ending with either a resolution or the point when the case reaches an extended dead end.

== Episodes ==
=== Season 1 (2011) ===
No. overall	No. in season	Title	Original release date
1	1	"The Good Student/Left in Danger/Lady on a Bridge"	June 2, 2011
2	2	"Critical Care"	June 9, 2011
3	3	"Tangled Web; Street Justice"	June 16, 2011
4	4	"Taken; Scorcher"	June 23, 2011
5	5	"Worried Sick; Silent Night"	June 30, 2011
6	6	"Mother's Day; Somebody Knows"	July 7, 2011
7	7	"The Graduate"	July 14, 2011

=== Season 2 (2012–13) ===
No. overall	No. in season	Title	Original release date	U.S. viewers (millions)
1	8	"A History of Violence"	March 15, 2012	1.42
2	9	"Desperate Measures; The Big City"	March 22, 2012	1.47
3	10	"In the Wind"	March 29, 2012	1.43
4	11	"Deleted/Cruel Streets"	April 5, 2012	1.40
5	12	"Lost Anniversary/Checked Out"	January 17, 2013	1.35
6	13	"Family Matters"	January 24, 2013	1.69
7	14	"3:10 to Yuma/Harm's Way"	January 31, 2013	1.63
8	15	"The Good Mother"	February 7, 2013	1.41
