= Shaun Micallef's On The Sauce =

Limited documentary series, about drinking alcohol

- Genre: Documentary
- Created by: Shaun Micallef
- Directed by: Tony Jackson
- Starring: Shaun Micallef; Dave Hughes
- Country of origin: Australia
- Original language: English
- No. of seasons: 1
- No. of episodes: 3

Production
- Executive producers: Paula Bycroft; Andrew Farrell; Shaun Micallef
- Producer: Paula Bycroft
- Production company: Cordell Jigsaw Productions Pty. Ltd.

Original release
- Network: ABC
- Release: 2020

Shaun Micallef's On The Sauce is an Australian television factual three-episode documentary series, about drinking alcohol, on ABC, starring comedian and writer Shaun Micallef.

Shaun Micallef, a former binge-drinker, at university, journeys around the nation to look at Australia's drinking culture. He is confronted by the highs and lows of alcohol consumption and the changing shape of Australia's national pastime. Micallef, with his sons approaching drinking age, considers what to advise them about alcohol. Later, in tears, says he lost his sister-in law to alcoholism complications, weeks before filming.

== Reception ==
Shaun Micallef’s On the Sauce was the highest-viewed, Screen Australia–supported, television documentary during 2020–2021, with 985,000 viewers.

Shaun Micallef’s On the Sauce was an Australian Teachers of Media Finalist, Best Factual Television Series.
