= Bill Mondy =

American actor (born 1963)

- Born: June 16, 1963 (age 63); Rochester, New York, U.S.
- Education: University of Illinois Urbana-Champaign (BFA); New York University (MFA)
- Occupation: Actor
- Years active: 1988–present
- Website: www.billmondy.com

Bill Mondy (born June 16, 1963), sometimes credited as Bill Monday, is an American actor. He is known for his roles as Deputy Roscoe in the television series The Dead Zone and for voicing characters such as Mr. Black in Johnny Test and Evac in Transformers: Cybertron.

== Early life and education ==
Mondy was born on June 16, 1963, in Rochester, New York. He earned a Bachelor of Fine Arts (BFA) from the University of Illinois Urbana-Champaign in 1985 and a master's degree from New York University's Graduate Acting Program in 1988.

== Career ==
After completing his education, Mondy began his acting career in theater, performing off-Broadway in productions such as a revival of Lanford Wilson's The Rimers of Eldritch at The Second Stage. He also played leading roles in regional theaters across the United States, including the Arena Stage, Actors Theatre of Louisville, The Huntington Theatre in Boston, and South Coast Repertory.

Mondy moved to Los Angeles and began a career in film and television. He is best known for his appearances in Star Trek: Deep Space Nine (in the episode "Armageddon Game") and The Dead Zone. He also made guest appearances in Wolf Lake and The 4400. His television credits include L.A. Law, Touched by an Angel, and UC: Undercover. He had recurring roles in Blade: The Series, Reunion, Smallville, and portrayed Deputy Roscoe in nearly 40 episodes of The Dead Zone.

His film appearances include roles in The Crow: Salvation, I Spy, and Miracle.

Mondy's voice acting work includes narrating shows such as The First 48: Missing Persons on A&E Network, Last Day of the Dinosaurs on Discovery, Edge Of War on the Military Channel, China's Warrior King for National Geographic, and The Hunt for Dark Matter on CuriosityStream. He voiced characters in animated series, including Mr. Black and Brain Freezer in Johnny Test, Memnock in Supernoobs, and Burnt Oak in My Little Pony: Friendship Is Magic. Mondy has also been a promo voice for Disney and CBS.

== Awards ==
In 2007, Mondy was nominated for a Leo Award for Best Supporting Performance by a Male in a Dramatic Series for his role in Robson Arms (for the episode "Mussolini and Me").

== Filmography ==
=== Films ===
Year	Title	Role	Ref
1989	Last Exit to Brooklyn	Uptown Doggie	
1998	Meet the Deedles	-	
2000	The Crow: Salvation	Phillip Dutton	
2001	Snowbound	Wiley	
2002	The Burial Society	Stuart Lightman	
2002	I Spy	McIntyre	
2002	The Dead Zone (Video)	Roscoe	
2004	Miracle	Lou Nanne	
2004	Scooby-Doo 2: Monsters Unleashed	Vomit Reporter	
2005	Edison	Public Defender	
2005	Chaos	FBI Agent Doyle	
2006	Gray Matters	Jordan Phillips	
2007	Kickin' It Old Skool	TV Bigwig	
2007	Postal	Mob Leader	
2008	The Day the Earth Stood Still	Helicopter Scientist #2	
2009	Case 39	Interviewer	
2013	Barbie in the Pink Shoes	Rothbart / Thorpe / Peasant (voice)	

=== Television ===
Television films

Year	Title	Role	Ref
1996	Unabomber: The True Story (also known as Unabomber)	TBA	
1997	In My Sister's Shadow	Mr. Connor	
1998	Before He Wakes	Winston Becker	
1998	The Perfect Getaway	Agent Lawrence	
1998	A Wing and a Prayer	Coach Passenger	
1999	Murder at 75 Birch	Stan	
2000	A Secret Life (Note: also known as Breach of Trust in the United Kingdom)	TBA	
2002	Dead in a Heartbeat	Patient	
2004	Meltdown	FBI Agent Tucci	
2004	The Survivors Club	Jack Collins	
2006	The Secret of Hidden Lake	Zack Roth	

Television series

Year	Title	Role(s)	Notes	Ref
1990	L.A. Law	Paul Zweibel		
1994	Star Trek: Deep Space Nine	Jakin		
1997–1999	Promised Land	Mr. Beckwith / Coop Lemley	2 episodes	
1999	Crusade	Nix		
2000	Da Vinci's Inquest	Philip Simms		
2000	Perfect Murder, Perfect Town	Ron Walker	Miniseries	
2000	Touched by an Angel	Bernie		
2001	Mobile Suit Gundam	Slegger Law (English voice)		
2001	The Sausage Factory	Coach Gardener		
2001	Wolf Lake	Vernon Dicky		
2001–2002	UC: Undercover	Scott Charles	3 episodes	
2002	Pasadena	Teacher	2 episodes	
2002, 2006, 2008–2009	Smallville	James Beales / Dr. Edward Groll		
2002–2007	The Dead Zone	Roscoe	34 episodes	
2003	Just Cause	I.N.S. Agent Glasgow		
2004	The L Word	Movie Type		
2005	The 4400	Agent Hubbard		
2005	Andromeda	Stranger		
2005	Reunion	Detective Matos	5 episodes	
2005	Terminal City	Frank	Miniseries	
2005–2006	Transformers: Cybertron	Evac (voice)		
2005–2014	Johnny Test	Mr. Black / Brain Freezer (voice)	Cartoon series	
2006	Blade	Detective Brian Boone		
2006–2008	Pucca	Clown (voice)		
2007	George of the Jungle	Mantler (voice)		
2007	Jibber Jabber	Jelly Roll / Dad (voice)		
2007	Supernatural	Dr. George Waxler	Episode: "Hunted"	
2009	Dinosaur Train	Uncle Jack (voice)	Episode: "Einiosaurus"	
2010	Dreamkix	Leonardo (voice)		
2011	The First 48: Missing Persons	Narrator		
2011–2021	Superbook	Additional voices		
2015–2019	Supernoobs	Memnock (voice)		
2017	My Little Pony: Friendship Is Magic	Burnt Oak (voice)		
2021–2022	Johnny Test	Mr. Black / Brain Freezer (voice)	Cartoon series	

=== Video games ===
Year	Title	Character	Ref
2000	007 Racing	Jack Wade	
2012	LittleBigPlanet PS Vita	Sean Brawn	

=== Podcasts ===
Year	Podcast Title	Role	Character/topic	Ref
2023	Supreme: The Battle for Roe	Justice Byron White	Justice Byron White	

=== Theatre ===
Year	Play	Role	Ref
1988	The Rimers of Eldritch	Walter	
