= A&E (Australian TV channel) =

Australian subscription television channel

A&E Australia
- Country: Australia

Programming
- Language: English
- Picture format: 576i (SDTV); 1080i (HDTV)
- Timeshift service: A&E + 2

Ownership
- Owner: Foxtel Networks
- Sister channels: Real History; Real Crime

History
- Launched: 16 February 2012; 13 years ago
- Closed: 31 July 2024; 17 months ago

A&E was an Australian subscription television channel.

The network closed on 31 July 2024 after the expiration of Foxtel's licensing agreement with A&E Networks International, with its programming dispersed onto Foxtel's streaming platform and Fox8, and its sister networks taking genericised names (History becoming Real History and C+I becoming Real Crime).

== Programming ==
=== Original programming ===
- Aussie Pickers (2013–2014)
- Bogan Hunters (2014)
- Demolition Man (2017–present)
- Desert Collectors (2017–present)
- Gus Worland: Marathon Man (2014)
- MegaTruckers (2012)
- Pawn Stars Australia (2015)
- Road to Riches (2019)
