= Jibber Jabber (TV series) =

- Genre: Animated television series; Comedy; Science fiction
- Created by: David Bowes; Sandy Flanagan; Bob Ennis; Jim Pescitelli
- Directed by: David Bowes
- Voices of: Ashleigh Ball; Kathleen Barr; Dorla Bell; Bill Mondy; Chantal Strand
- Composer: Michael Richard Plowman
- Country of origin: Canada
- Original language: English
- No. of seasons: 1
- No. of episodes: 26

Production
- Executive producers: Patti Poskitt; John Thomas
- Producer: David Bowes
- Cinematography: Bob Ennis
- Running time: 11 minutes
- Production companies: Northwest Imaging and FX; Jibber Jabber Toons Ltd.

Original release
- Network: YTV
- Release: September 3 – December 7, 2007

Jibber Jabber (also known as Jibber and Jabber) is a Canadian children's television series about the brothers Jibber and Jabber, who like to imagine things.

== Characters ==
- Jibber and Jabber are the titular protagonists of the series, Jibber and Jabber are seven-year-old fraternal (non-identical) twins. They have very active imaginations, and both share the same vision of their adventures. Jibber is distinguished by always wearing a red shirt and having dark brown hair and Jabber is characterised as wearing a green shirt and having strawberry blonde hair.
- Jessica is Jibber and Jabber's older sister, who usually figures as an antagonist in the boys' imaginary adventures. In real life, she is exasperated and embarrassed by their actions, particularly when her best friend Marcy is around.
- Jelly Roll: Jibber, Jabber and Jessica's dog. He is usually an oblivious participant in Jibber and Jabber's adventures.
- Marcy is Jessica's best friend.
- Mom and Dad are Jibber, Jabber and Jessica's parents, they are never seen in the show but can be heard occasionally while their hands are seen.
- Squirrel is seen in some episodes but is rarely seen by Jibber and Jabber. He is an enemy of Jelly Roll by constantly stealing Jelly's food and he is seen once with another squirrel.

== Imaginary adventures types ==
- Pirates
- Astronauts
- Kung Fu
- Terror Laboratory
- Goth Victorians
- Superheroes
- Invisibles

== Episodes ==
1. Mission to Mars
2. Pride of Frankenstein
3. Pirates of Privacy
4. Mutiny of Privacy
5. Cartoon Satellite
6. Flu Day
7. The Wrong Stuff
8. Do You See What I See
9. Jelly's Belly
10. Pirates of Nowhere
11. Kung Food
12. The Greatest Wall
13. Enter the Jelly
14. Book of Endings
15. The Chamber of Perils
16. Brain vs Brawn
17. Night of the Werewolf
18. Lady Jess and Ms Hyde
19. Night of the Vampire
20. No Such Things As Ghosts
21. Space for Sale
22. One Bad Asteroid
23. Pirates Plunder Blunder
24. Attack of the Giant Worm-a-Noids
25. April Fools Rules
26. Double or Nothing

== Cast ==
- Ashleigh Ball - Jabber
- Kathleen Barr - Jibber/Mom
- Dorla Bell - Marcy
- Bill Mondy - Jelly Roll/Dad
- Chantal Strand - Jessica

== Production ==
Jibber Jabber is animated by Northwest Imaging and FX (NWFX), a visual effects and animation company based in Vancouver), in association with Jibber Jabber Toons Ltd. for YTV in Monday, September 3, 2007. The series was the inaugural project for NWFX's animation division, and the company hired 25 full-time animators and added 17 Autodesk Maya 3D workstations specifically for the series. Although the entire series is computer-animated, it is rendered to resemble traditional stop-motion animation.

== Broadcast details ==
The series was produced as 26 segments of about 11 minutes each, which are generally broadcast as 13 half-hour episodes.

The series debuted on YTV in Monday, September 3, 2007. The series has also been sold to KI.KA (Germany), Jetix (Latin America), TRT (Turkey), E-Junior and Al Jazeera Children's Channel (Middle East), RTP (Portugal), Arutz HaYeladim (Israel), BBC Alba (Scotland) and ABC (Australia).

== Awards ==
In 2008, Jibber Jabber won four out of the five Leo Awards it was nominated for: Best Animation Program or Series; Best Overall Sound; Best Musical Score and Best Screenwriting. In 2009, the Production won a Pulcinella Award at Cartoons on the Bay, Italy for: Best Animated Character
