= Just waiting for a mate =

Australian internet meme

"Just waiting for a mate" is the informal name given to a viral video clip from the Australian TV reality television show Highway Patrol. The video clip depicts a typical Australian bogan, who responds with preposterous answers to police questioning. The clip has received international attention after viral viewing in Reddit, the phrase has been part of the Aussie vocab since at least the 1980’s Australian Lexicon.

The footage has received 5 million views on YouTube (including millions more on other platforms), and inspired the creation of image macros and remix videos. It is widely seen as both a celebration and mockery of Aussie bogan culture.

== Background ==
The clip was filmed as part of the Australian reality show Highway Patrol. In the incident, Senior Constable Ash Bowden attends to an accident in a shopping centre car park in Carrum Downs. He questions a man who appears to be drunk, and sitting immobilized in the driver's seat of a car. When asked what he is doing, the man claims he is simply innocently "just waiting for a mate". The car has clearly been in a collision and has been immobilized after an accident, a fact comically revealed after the alleged driver has made repeated denials of being in an accident.

The man goes on to make further illogical statements and excuses, pretending to be oblivious to the state of his damaged car.

The clip is famous in Australia for the bogan aspect of the responses of the subject of the video. It has been referred to as one of Australia's greatest video clips and an iconic meme after it went viral. The phrase correspondingly became a common term in Australia, referring to the meme, and the incident earned notoriety in legal commentary, with the driver noted as one of "Australia's Top 5 Dumbest criminals". The Guardian referred to the clip as "one of the ten funniest things on the Internet", noting the humour of the driver's relentless denial despite the obvious state of his car.

Over time, other commentary on the incident rallied against the humour, noting the seriousness of the incident, given that the individual driver was apparently drink driving.
