= Julia Zemiro's Home Delivery =

Australian TV series

- Genre: Talk show
- Starring: Julia Zemiro
- Country of origin: Australia
- Original language: English
- No. of series: 9
- No. of episodes: 77

Production
- Executive producers: Damian Davis; Jon Casimir; Richard Huddleston
- Producer: Polly Connolly
- Production locations: Australia; New Zealand; United Kingdom
- Running time: 26 minutes
- Production company: CJZ

Original release
- Network: ABC
- Release: 18 September 2013 – 10 July 2022

Julia Zemiro's Home Delivery is an Australian television interview series, starring Julia Zemiro and produced by CJZ (Cordell Jigsaw Zapruder).

Each episode featured Zemiro interviewing a celebrity or prominent person while visiting locations important to the interviewee, usually from their early life.

Zemiro and her guest often travel in vintage cars dating from the interviewee's youth. Early in the series, the show focused on interviewing comedians; it then expanded to include a broader range of guests. The last episode aired on 10 July 2022.

== Episodes ==
=== Series overview ===
Series	Episodes	Originally released	
Series	Episodes	First released	Last released
1	5	18 September 2013	16 October 2013
2	9	15 October 2014	10 December 2014
3	11	3 June 2015	12 August 2015
4	10	3 February 2016	6 April 2016
5	10	1 February 2017	5 April 2017
6	10	2 May 2018	11 July 2018
7	10	9 October 2019	11 December 2019
8	8	20 May 2020	8 July 2020
9	4	19 June 2022	10 July 2022

=== Series 1 (2013) ===
No. overall	No. in season	Interviewee	Original release date	Australian viewers
1	1	Alan Brough	18 September 2013	699,000
2	2	Carl Barron	25 September 2013	613,000
3	3	Shane Jacobson	2 October 2013	576,000
4	4	Noeline Brown	9 October 2013	621,000
5	5	John Safran	16 October 2013	726,000

=== Series 2 (2014) ===
No. overall	No. in season	Interviewee	Original release date	Australian viewers
6	1	Dave Hughes	15 October 2014	603,000
7	2	Wendy Harmer	22 October 2014	501,000
8	3	Ross Noble	29 October 2014	528,000
9	4	Julia Morris	5 November 2014	435,000
10	5	Bill Bailey	12 November 2014	549,000
11	6	Sam Simmons	19 November 2014	386,000
12	7	Ruth Jones	26 November 2014	494,000
13	8	Nazeem Hussain	3 December 2014	N/A
14	9	Stephen Curry	10 December 2014	N/A

=== Series 3 (2015) ===
No. overall	No. in season	Interviewee	Original release date	Australian viewers
15	1	Ian Thorpe	3 June 2015	614,000
16	2	Matt Lucas	10 June 2015	585,000
17	3	Leigh Sales	17 June 2015	574,000
18	4	Alan Davies	24 June 2015	659,000
19	5	Kurt Fearnley	1 July 2015	565,000
20	6	Jo Brand	8 July 2015	492,000
21	7	Waleed Aly	15 July 2015	707,000
22	8	Billy Bragg	22 July 2015	587,000
23	9	Ita Buttrose	29 July 2015	535,000
24	10	Matt Moran	5 August 2015	556,000
25	11	Mandy McElhinney	12 August 2015	583,000

=== Series 4 (2016) ===
No. overall	No. in season	Interviewee	Original release date	Australian viewers
26	1	Kerry O'Brien	3 February 2016	637,000
27	2	Rebel Wilson	10 February 2016	502,000
28	3	Glenn McGrath	17 February 2016	539,000
29	4	Stan Grant	24 February 2016	558,000
30	5	Denise Scott	2 March 2016	528,000
31	6	Geoffrey Robertson	9 March 2016	651,000
32	7	Miranda Tapsell	16 March 2016	507,000
33	8	Greig Pickhaver	23 March 2016	556,000
34	9	Ben Quilty	30 March 2016	581,000
35	10	Kerri-Anne Kennerley	6 April 2016	595,000

=== Series 5 (2017) ===
No. overall	No. in season	Interviewee	Original release date	Australian viewers
36	1	Sam Neill	1 February 2017	616,000
37	2	Cathy Freeman	8 February 2017	513,000
38	3	Annabel Crabb	15 February 2017	584,000
39	4	Lee Lin Chin	22 February 2017	603,000
40	5	Colin Hay	1 March 2017	460,000
41	6	Susan Carland	8 March 2017	448,000
42	7	Derryn Hinch	15 March 2017	495,000
43	8	Tim Ferguson	22 March 2017	550,000
44	9	Kasey Chambers	29 March 2017	508,000
45	10	Ronny Chieng	5 April 2017	467,000

=== Series 6 (2018) ===
No. overall	No. in season	Interviewee	Original release date	Australian viewers
46	1	Rebecca Gibney	2 May 2018	609,000
47	2	Maggie Beer	9 May 2018	618,000
48	3	Brian Cox	16 May 2018	638,000
49	4	Louis Theroux	30 May 2018	591,000
50	5	Barrie Cassidy	6 June 2018	594,000
51	6	Raelene Boyle	13 June 2018	591,000
52	7	Germaine Greer	20 June 2018	576,000
53	8	Dave Faulkner	27 June 2018	490,000
54	9	Nicky Winmar	4 July 2018	505,000
55	10	Cate McGregor	11 July 2018	441,000

=== Series 7 (2019) ===
No. overall	No. in season	Interviewee	Original release date	Australian viewers
56	1	Costa Georgiadis	9 October 2019	N/A
57	2	Magda Szubanski	16 October 2019	N/A
58	3	Nakkiah Lui	24 October 2019	N/A
59	4	Bill Bryson	31 October 2019	N/A
60	5	Judith Lucy	6 November 2019	N/A
61	6	Gillian Triggs	13 November 2018	N/A
62	7	Ian Chappell	20 November 2019	N/A
63	8	Bill Oddie	27 November 2019	N/A
64	9	Shane Gould	4 December 2019	N/A
65	10	Adam Liaw	11 December 2019	N/A

=== Series 8 (2020) ===
No. overall	No. in season	Interviewee	Original release date	Australian viewers
66	1	Dr. Karl Kruszelnicki	20 May 2020	N/A
67	2	Celeste Barber	27 May 2020	N/A
68	3	Jacqui Lambie	3 June 2020	N/A
69	4	Craig Reucassel	10 June 2020	N/A
70	5	Yael Stone	17 June 2020	N/A
71	6	Gillian Armstrong	24 June 2020	N/A
72	7	Scott Farquhar	1 July 2020	N/A
73	8	Casey Donovan	7 July 2020	N/A

=== Series 9 (2022) ===
No. overall	No. in season	Interviewee	Original release date	Australian viewers
74	1	Ray Martin	19 June 2022	N/A
75	2	Marcia Hines	26 June 2022	N/A
76	3	Stephen Page	3 July 2022	N/A
77	4	Julia Zemiro	10 July 2022	N/A
