= Raise My Kids =

Kiwis reality television show

- Country of origin: New Zealand

Original release
- Network: TVNZ
- Release: 2005 – present

Raise My Kids is a New Zealand reality show wherein participants are put in charge of the children of a relative or family member for five days.
