= Dave in the Life =

- Genre: Comedy
- Starring: Dave Zwolenski
- Country of origin: Australia
- Original language: English
- No. of seasons: 2
- No. of episodes: 17

Production
- Running time: 30 minutes

Original release
- Network: SBS One
- Release: 11 May 2009

Dave in the Life is an Australian television documentary series starring Dave Zwolenski first screened on SBS One in 2009.

The show saw Dave stepping into the shoes of different people each week as he tries life as a shock jock, a politician, a homeless person, a headline-grabbing artist, a survivalist, a hunter and a pensioner. The series is described as 'a comical journey into some great "Aussie divides but also explores the serious social issues, myths, themes and topical stories of modern Australia". Some of the guests Dave spent time with included Barnaby Joyce, Andrew Fraser, Mike Carlton, Sandy Aloisi, Housing Minister Tanya Plibersek and a range of others.

Three episodes of the show were aired on SBS, but was then pulled due to programming issues. The show was then aired three months later at a different time slot of 9pm Thursdays and finally moved again to 8:30pm. The show received mostly positive reviews but was not renewed for a second season.
