= Mike King Tonight =

- Title card
- Written by: Mike King; Andrew Clay; Te Radar
- Presented by: Mike King
- Narrated by: Robert Taylor
- Country of origin: New Zealand
- No. of episodes: 10

Production
- Executive producer: Tony Manson
- Production location: Bruce Mason Centre
- Production company: Greenstone TV

Original release
- Network: TV2
- Release: 16 July – 16 December 2003

Mike King Tonight is a New Zealand late-night talk show hosted by mental health advocate and then-comedian, Mike King, that aired for one season in 2003. It aired on TV2.

== Background ==
The show was a general late-night talk show that was filmed in front of a live studio audience at the Bruce Mason Centre in Takapuna, New Zealand. King was the host for the show with various special guests on each episode. The show was funded by NZ on Air.
