= World of Stupid =

American television series

World of Stupid on DVD.

World of Stupid is an American television series which aired on the Fox Reality network in the U.S., and on the Razer network in Canada. The show is seemingly inspired by the American television series Jackass. World of Stupid chronicles ten groups of people in 10 different cities performing often dangerous stunts and pranks.

The show has featured such stunt groups as The Dudesons of Finland.
