= Dog Squad =

- Narrated by: Jason Hoyte
- Country of origin: New Zealand
- Original language: English
- No. of seasons: 13

Production
- Producer: Jani Alexander
- Running time: 22 minutes
- Production company: Greenstone TV

Original release
- Network: TVNZ
- Release: 25 July 2011 – present

Dog Squad is a reality TV show following working dogs and their handlers as they go about their daily duties. It is set in New Zealand and focuses on dog-handler pairs working for the Police, Department of Corrections, Customs, the CAA, Department of Conservation, and search and rescue.

Dog Squad currently airs between 8:00–8:30pm on Mondays on TV One. It was created by the same people who created Border Patrol. The first episode of Dog Squad aired on 25 July 2011. The show also screens in Australia on Channel 7, under the title Dog Patrol.
