= The Obesity Myth =

- Narrated by: Tara Morice
- Composer: Julian Langdon
- Country of origin: Australia
- Original language: English
- No. of episodes: 3

Production
- Executive producers: Rick McPhee; Michael Cordell
- Producers: Esther Coleman-Hawkins; Tamara Bodenham; Shaun McAlpine
- Cinematography: Bruce Permezel; Joanne Donahue-Beckwith
- Editors: Alex Archer; Katie Flaxman; Wayne Hyett; Zac Grant (additional); Lillian Brown (assist); Ash Watson (online)
- Running time: 60 minutes
- Production company: CJZ

Original release
- Network: SBS
- Release: 4 September – 18 September 2017

The Obesity Myth is a three-part Australian television documentary series, broadcast by SBS.

The documentary follows the lives of morbidly obese patients at Melbourne's Austin Health as they go through a weight loss program.

== Episodes ==
- Episode 1 - Battling the Biology
- Episode 2 - Eating Your Feelings
- Episode 3 - A Series of Complications
