= The Great Australian Cookbook =

- Genre: Food & Lifestyle
- Country of origin: Australia
- Original language: English
- No. of episodes: 11

Production
- Running time: 30 min
- Production company: CJZ

Original release
- Network: Lifestyle (Australian TV channel), Foxtel
- Release: 7 November 2017

The Great Australian Cookbook is an Australian television series based on the similarly named cookbook created by Reg Mombassa in collaboration with Kylie Kwong, Charmaine Solomon, George Calombaris and Maggie Beer. The television series features 22 prominent Australian cooks, amongst whom Matt Moran, Maggie Beer, Paul West and Darren Robertson. Over 11 episodes, they are profiled filming meals in their homes and work for friends and family.

== Episodes ==
=== Series 1 ===
1. Matt Stone & Maggie Beer
2. Gilbert Lau & Darren Robertson
3. Matt Moran & Rayleen Brown
4. Victor & Ev Liong & Nick Holloway
5. Carol & Sharon Salloum & Peter Russell-Clarke
6. Matt Wilkinson & Simmone Logue
7. Ronni Kahn & Paul West
8. Merle Parrish & Peter Gilmore
9. Ross O'meara & Anna Polyviou
10. Frank Camorra & Clayton Donovan
11. Alla Wolf-Tasker & Rodney Dunn
