= Canal 8 Sport =

Danish television channel

- Country: Denmark
- Broadcast area: Denmark

Programming
- Language: Danish

Ownership
- Owner: Discovery Networks Northern Europe
- Sister channels: Canal 9

History
- Launched: 13 August 2012; 13 years ago
- Replaced: Canal+ Sport 1
- Closed: 30 June 2015; 10 years ago
- Replaced by: Eurosport DK (2015); Eurosport 2 (2016-)

Links
- Website: http://www.canal8.dk

CANAL8 Sport was a Danish television channel owned by TV4 Group and C More Entertainment.

The channel was announced on 3 July 2012. The channel replaced Canal+ Sport 1 in Denmark.

The reason for this is that after Canal+ lost the rights to the Premier League in 2010, they have a hard time keeping the subscribers in Denmark to their premium sports package. And thus it was decided to move the most popular sport with Danish viewer interest from a high pay channel to an advertising financing low pay channel. the channel is first of all a football channel and show matches from Danish Superliga, UEFA Europa League, La Liga, Serie A and Eredivisie and other sports like UFC fighting, ATP Tennis, Indycar Racing and Swedish Hockey League.

Following this decision, the C More Sports package was not made available in Denmark.

An HD version of Canal 8 Sport was launched on 3 June 2013.

In the Summer of 2015, Discovery Networks Northern Europe purchase the channel, and on 1 July 2015 it merged with Eurosport 2 into a new sportschannel called Eurosport DK.

== History ==
=== 2012 ===
Canal 8 Sport was, from the start on 13 August 2012, available in the Danish cable networks YouSee and Stofa and on satellite via Canal Digital, while negotiations are ongoing with the other Danish operators. incl. Boxer TV A/S

On 17 December 2012 the channel became available in Viasat's sports package on satellite and on IPTV Network Waoo together with Canal 9

=== 2013 ===
On 20 April 2013 it was announced that the HD version would be launched on Monday 3 June 2013

On 2 September 2003 it was announced that Canal 8 Sport would become available in Boxer TV A/S's digital terrestrial television network in Denmark on 26 September 2013, together with C More's other channel C More Series & the VOD service C More Play.

=== 2014 ===
Because of UFC started their own streaming service UFC Fight Pass could Canal 9 & Canal 8 Sport not get the extension of their rights to the UFC PPV and UFC Fight Night, but they would still be able to show the UFC's TV shows like UFC Unleashed, UFC Main Event & classics WEC Events. This was announced on their Facebook page on 4 January 2014.

On 1 March 2014 it was announced that C More & Canal 9 & Canal 8 Sport in Denmark has made a new deal with UFC, they get the rights to the UFC PPV and UFC Fight Night for 2014 & 2015. This was announced on their Facebook page.

On 14 March 2014 it emerged that TV4 Group and C More Entertainment, might sell Canal8 Sports and Canal 9 in Denmark because of the poor economy, according to the newspaper BT, they are currently negotiating with TV 2 Denmark and SBS Discovery Media.

On 26 June 2014 it was announced that Canal 9 & Canal 8 Sport had lost one of their strongest football rights, The Danish Superliga from the 2015–16season, to Viasat and SBS Discovery Media.

Later on 26 June 2014, it was announced that Discovery Networks Northern Europe and C More Entertainment has entered into an agreement that Discovery Networks Northern Europe has the option to purchase Canal 8 Sport and Canal 9 of C More Entertainment in 2015. The Agreement is an extension of the SBS Discovery Media has just signed a six-year agreement for the rights to two weekly matches from The Danish Superliga. The two matches as SBS Discovery Media bought is the 2nd and 5th match the selection from every round (the matches that Canal 9 has been showing since 2009) and the agreement will take effect from season 2015/16 and will run for six years. And the plan is to continue The Danish Superliga on Canal 8 Sport and Canal 9 after summer 2015.

The agreement with C More Entertainment also meant that Discovery Networks Northern Europe on 1 August 2014 would take over the sale of television advertising on the two channels.

On 18 July 2014 Canal 9 & Canal 8 Sport announced on their Facebook page that they had not extended their right to Eredivisie.

On 26 September 2014 Discovery Networks Northern Europe announced that they would use the option and buy Canal 8 Sport and Canal 9, the purchase must be approved by the Danish competition authorities and the purchase is expected to take in place during 2015.

=== 2015 ===
On 27 May 2015 the Danish competition authorities announced that they have approved Discovery Networks Northern Europe purchase of Canal 8 Sport & Canal 9, they take over the channels from 1 July 2015.

On 28 May 2015 Discovery Networks Northern Europe announced that they would merge Canal 8 Sport and Eurosport 2 in to Eurosport DK in Denmark from 1 July 2015, and take the rights fra the two channel in to one channel and with the best from Eurosport but now in Danish with more rights targeting Danish viewers, and with 2,400 hours of live sports a year, Eurosport DK will be the channel with the most live sports hours per year. With sports rights like football from Danish Superliga, Bundesliga, Major League Soccer, Capital One Cup, UEFA Euro 2016 qualifying, Tennis from ATP Tour, WTA Tour and 3 Grand Slam, Cycling from UCI World Tour, Winter sport, Motorsports and much more.

== Sports Rights ==
=== Football ===
- UEFA Europa League (season 2012/13-2014/15)
- Danish Superliga (season 2012/13-2014/15)
- La Liga (season 2012/13-2014/15)
- Serie A (season 2012/13-2014/15)
- Copa del Rey (season 2012/13-2014/15)
- Major League Soccer (season 2012 & 2013)
- Allsvenskan (season 2012-2014)
- Eredivisie (season 2012/13-2013/14)
- Coupe de France (season 2012/13-2013/14)
- Emirates Cup (2013 & 2014)
- Barça TV (season 2012/13)
- Real Madrid TV (season 2012/13)
- Milan TV (2013)
- Arsenal TV (2013-2015)

=== Tennis ===
- ATP Tour (2012-2015)
- Various tournaments on the WTA Tour (2012-2015)
- Davis Cup (2012-2015)

=== Fighting ===
- UFC PPV (2012-2015)
- UFC Fight Night (2012-2015)
- The Ultimate Fighter (XIV-XV)
- Rumble Of The Kings (2012)
- UFC Unleashed (2012-2015)
- UFC Main Event (2012-2015)
- WEC Classic Events (2012-2013)

=== Motorsports ===
- Swedish Speedway Elitseries (2012-2015)
- Scandinavian Touring Car Championship (2012)
- IndyCar Series (2012-2014)
- British Speedway Elite League (2013-2014)

=== Ice hockey ===
- SHL (season 2012/13-2014/15)
- AHL All-Star Game (2014)

=== American Football ===
- Legends Football League (season2012/13)

=== Show Jumping and Dressage ===
- FEI Nations Cup (2012-2014)
- Dressage World Cup (2012-2014)

=== Programs from ESPN Classic ===
- 30 for 30 (2012-2014)
- ESPN Classic Ringside (2012-2014)
