= Intensive Care Unit (TV series) =

- Also known as: ICU A Matter of Life and Death
- Country of origin: Australia
- No. of seasons: 1

Production
- Running time: 30 Minutes (including commercials)

Original release
- Network: Seven Network
- Release: 3 February 2010

Intensive Care Unit or ICU A Matter of Life and Death is a 2010 Television Factual Program that aired on the Seven Network. It was thought the show was axed with "The White Room", however it was later revealed by a Seven Spokesperson that the show would return at a later point. The show is narrated by Caroline Craig

== Format ==
The show explores the lives of patients inside the Intensive Care Unit at the Alfred Hospital, each episodes shows a number of patients trying to recover from their injuries. The series follows the patients for days, weeks and months, with their stay in the ICU and other parts of the Alfred Hospital and the work that the medical and nursing staff perform each day.

== Production ==
The show is produced by the Seven Network Limited, who also produces The Force and Find My Family. It was thought the show was axed due to the poor ratings it received however a spokesperson for the Seven Network said that the show would return later on in the year. It first premiered on 3 February.
