= Highway Patrol (Australian TV series) =

- Genre: Factual
- Starring: Members of Victoria Police
- Narrated by: Hugh Wade
- Composer: Peter Hobbs
- Country of origin: Australia
- Original language: English
- No. of seasons: 14
- No. of episodes: 124 + 8 specials (list of episodes)

Production
- Executive producer: Nick Murray
- Producer: Mary Durham
- Production locations: Melbourne, Victoria, Australia
- Running time: 21–22 minutes (Plus Commercials)
- Production company: Greenstone TV

Original release
- Network: Seven Network
- Release: 21 September 2009 – present

Related
- Motorway Patrol

Highway Patrol is an Australian factual television series screened on the Seven Network, which premiered on 21 September 2009. Highway Patrol follows members of the Victoria Police highway patrol (formerly the Traffic Management Unit) as they intercept traffic and other criminal offenders on roads in Victoria, Australia.

== Synopsis ==
The program follows police involved in attending major road accidents, high-speed police chases, confronting drunk drivers as well as issuing lesser penalty notices to drivers for a variety of traffic offences.

Each episode follows the progress of a select few incidents involving various officers, from the first encounter by the officers through to the officers leaving the scene, with the exception that occasionally the officers will escort a driver back to a police station for the purpose of a breath or blood sample. Fines, court convictions and demerit points issued in relation to each incident are shown in a voiced-over addendum at the end.

Highway Patrol is produced by Greenstone TV, makers of New Zealand's Motorway Patrol with the co-operation of Victoria Police, and airs in Australia on the Seven Network. Domestically, repeated episodes air on sister channels 7two and 7mate as well as syndicated on subscription television channel FOX8.

Internationally, the program is screened in New Zealand on TV2, Denmark on Canal 9, Norway on Canal 9 and the United Kingdom on ITV4 and Pick.

== Production ==
The first season of Highway Patrol went to air in September 2009. A second season was announced by Channel Seven on 18 November 2009 which premiered 2 February 2010. A seventh season of Highway Patrol was announced on the show's official website on 13 July 2014. On 9 December 2014, Victoria Police announced on their official Facebook page that season eight had started filming and would air sometime in 2016. On 15 December 2014, series producer Mary Durham announced that season 7 would consist of 10 episodes and would air sometime in 2015.

In October 2015, Greenstone TV confirmed that season 8 was in post production. In March 2016, it was announced that season 9 had started filming to air in 2017. In July 2018, Channel 7 released their first promotion for season 10 to begin airing from Wednesday 1 August 2018.

In November 2019, Greenstone TV announced that the final two episodes of series 11 will most likely air in 2020 and filming for the 12th season will start filming mid year. On 18 November Greenstone TV also launched an official Highway Patrol Facebook.

== Episodes ==
Series	Episodes	Originally released	
Series	Episodes	First released	Last released
1	10	21 September 2009	23 November 2009
2	10	30 June 2010	27 July 2011
3	10	9 February 2012	7 May 2012
4	9	3 October 2012	21 November 2012
5	12	1 May 2013	25 November 2013
6	9	8 July 2014	17 November 2014
7	10	24 June 2015	31 August 2015
8	10	4 July 2016	9 November 2016
9	10	17 July 2017	22 October 2017
10	10	1 August 2018	12 September 2018
11	10	26 August 2019	25 March 2020
12	10	27 March 2023	26 March 2024
13	10	31 October 2024	14 April 2025
14	TBA	4 February 2026	TBA
S	8	10 June 2010	12 August 2020
