= Motorway Patrol =

- Genre: Observational Documentary Television Series
- Starring: Motorway Patrol Officers
- Narrated by: Derek Judge
- Composer: Liquid Studios
- Country of origin: New Zealand
- Original language: English
- No. of seasons: 20
- No. of episodes: 206

Production
- Executive producer: Andrea Lamb
- Producers: Philippa Hall, Peter Clews, Tash Christie
- Production locations: Auckland, New Zealand
- Camera setup: OPC, multi single-camera crews
- Running time: 22 minutes (approx)
- Production company: Greenstone TV

Original release
- Network: TVNZ 2 (1999-2025), TVNZ 1 (2025-present)
- Release: 16 September 1999 – present

Related
- Highway Patrol (Australian TV series); Highway Cops (New Zealand TV series); Road Cops (New Zealand TV series)

Motorway Patrol is a New Zealand observational documentary show created by Greenstone Pictures. The show follows the daily lives of police officers patrolling the motorways of New Zealand.

The show is also shown on ITV4 and Sky Mix in the United Kingdom.

== About the show ==
The show follows Motorway Patrol officers who pull over drivers on the motorways of Auckland for all sorts of suspected infractions of the law, including dangerous driving, speeding and when vehicles are 'unroadworthy'. There are major road accidents, suspects caught with illegal substances and much more, thus offering a certain type of drama and action for the viewer. In 2009, Australia launched its own version of the New Zealand series, titled Highway Patrol.

The show depicts the police involved in high-speed police chases, attending major road accidents, confronting out-of-control drunk drivers as well as issuing lesser penalty notices to drivers. Each episode follows the progress of a select few incidents involving various Highway Patrol officers, from the first encounter by the officers through to the officers leaving the scene, with the exception that occasionally the officers will escort a driver back to a police station for the purpose of a breath test or blood sample. Fines, court convictions and demerit points issued in relation to each incident are shown in a voiced-over addendum at the end.

== See also ==
- Highway Patrol (Australian TV series)
- Ten 7 Aotearoa
