= Coastwatch Oz =

- Starring: Water police and Fisheries officers
- Narrated by: Dorji Swallow
- Country of origin: Australia
- Original language: English
- No. of seasons: 1
- No. of episodes: 10

Production
- Producer: Greenstone TV
- Running time: Approx 30 minutes (including commercials)

Original release
- Network: Seven Network
- Release: 30 January 2014 – 4 January 2015

Related
- New Zealand's Coastwatch

Coastwatch Oz is an Australian factual television series screened on the Seven Network That Premiered on 30 January 2014.

== About the show ==
The show follows the work of officers of Water police from the New South Wales Marine Area Command Police, Fisheries Officers from the New South Wales Department of Primary Industries who are committed to protecting seas and waterways.

The show depicts the police involved in Boat police chases, attending major Water accidents, confronting out-of-control drunk and People on drugs as well as issuing penalty notices to Boat drivers. Each episode follows the progress of a select few incidents involving various Water Police and Fisheries officers, from the first encounter by the officers through to the officers leaving the scene, with the exception that occasionally the officers will escort a driver back to a police station for the purpose of a breath or blood sample. Fines, court convictions and demerit points issued in relation to each incident are shown in a voiced-over addendum at the end.

As of 9 January 2015, Greenstone TV have no plans to make a 2nd Season. Greenstone TV stated on 9 January 2015, that the series will not be sold on DVD to the Public.

== Episodes ==
No.	Title	Original release date	AUS viewers (thousands)
1	"Irate Fisherman"	30 January 2014	801,000
A man in a crippled yacht fears for his life as he drifts hundreds of kilometers out to sea in terrible weather conditions. Meanwhile, Senior Fisheries are involved in an explosive confrontation at The Entrance and drunken shenanigans on Sydney Harbour turn nasty.
2	"Esky Rescue"	6 February 2014	685,000
Poachers claim it's their right to steal as an abalone bust in Batemans Bay which threatens to turn violent. Out at sea, a boat with two men and two boys on board sinks in less than a minute and water police rush to find them.
3	"100kg Bust"	18 June 2014	554,000
Fisheries go on surveillance to stop a skipper operating a black market scam.
4	"Caught With Ketamine"	18 June 2014	554,000
Aboard a party boat in Sydney Harbour, officers and drug dogs are kept very busy.
5	"Crab Catcher"	30 November 2014	647,000
Fisheries mount a major high-tech undercover campaign to catch thieves pillaging the nets of commercial crab fishermen. Then there's the flashing drunk on Manly Beach – he's drunk and his language is terrible.
6	"Paul's Haul"	7 December 2014	574,000
When a young man is shot in the stomach in Sydney, the dive team is called in to help locate the weapon in a nearby river. Meanwhile other officers are dispatched to the outskirts of Sydney Harbour when reports come in of a liferaft threatening to wash onto the rocks. Then a random trawler inspection hits the big time when Fisheries find a skipper who's breaking multiple laws.
7	"Dive Homicide"	14 December 2014	558,000
when a large package weighed down with chains washes up on shore, everything points to a mafia-style execution. What police find inside is horrifying.
8	"Jet Ski Anger"	21 December 2014	677,000
A man enrages swimmers and boaties when he races a jetski past them at high speed. And when police catch up with him, he angrily denies everything.
9	"Keith The Thief"	28 December 2014	742,000
after weeks of surveillance, Fisheries and Police knock on the door of an Illawarra home with a warrant for search and seizure. Not only do they discover evidence of an illegal syndicate, but they also find a massive stash of cash!
10	"Abalone And Cash"	4 January 2015	779,000
After weeks of surveillance, Fisheries and Police search a home where the occupant is involved in the black market abalone trade and find more than they expect. Fisheries and police team up for an offshore operation, of a suspiciously hostile boat. Another fisherman is trying to sell his illegal catch through a legal forum – the Sydney Fish Market. And a repeat drink driver is caught behind the wheel of a boat.
