= The Killer Speaks =

- Genre: Documentary
- Country of origin: United States
- Original language: English
- No. of seasons: 2
- No. of episodes: 10

Production
- Running time: 40-43 minutes
- Production company: ITV Studios America

Original release
- Network: A&E
- Release: April 11, 2013 – May 29, 2014

Related
- The First 48

The Killer Speaks is an American documentary television series on A&E that debuted on April 11, 2013 and ended on May 29, 2014. The Killer Speaks features actual convicted felons as they describe their crimes step-by-step in chilling detail. The series purports to offer an autopsy of their psychology and motivations. Subjects include spree killers, serial killers and domestic violence killers. The Killer Speaks casts killers from all over the country, not just from The First 48 series.

== Episodes ==
Season	Episodes	Originally released	
Season	Episodes	First released	Last released
1	5	April 11, 2013	May 9, 2013
2	5	May 1, 2014	May 29, 2014

=== Season 1 (2013) ===
No. overall	No. in season	Title	Original release date	Prod. code	U.S. viewers (millions)
0	0	"The First 48: The Killer Speaks"	March 8, 2012	100	1.76
This pilot episode describes the case of Terry Blair.
1	1	"Ice Cold: Levi King"	April 11, 2013	103	1.51
2	2	"Mad Maks: Maksim Gelman"	April 18, 2013	101	1.53
3	3	"Monster Inside: Robert Lopez"	April 25, 2013	105	1.18
4	4	"Twisted Love: Dena Riley"	May 2, 2013	104	1.28
5	5	"Payback: Earl Forrest"	May 9, 2013	102	1.52

=== Season 2 (2014) ===
No. overall	No. in season	Title	Original release date	U.S. viewers (millions)
6	1	"Gene Meredith: Devil Inside"	May 1, 2014	1.15
7	2	"Timothy Thomason: Perfect Murder"	May 8, 2014	1.09
8	3	"Lawrence Tarbert: Natural Born Killer"	May 15, 2014	1.11
9	4	"Gary Ray Bowles: The I-95 Killer"	May 22, 2014	1.25
10	5	"Van Brett Watkins: Hitman"	May 29, 2014	N/A
