= Neighbours at War =

- Genre: Factual
- Country of origin: New Zealand
- Original language: English
- No. of seasons: 8

Production
- Running time: 30 minutes (Including commercials)

Original release
- Network: TV2
- Release: 2005 – 2015

Neighbours at War (2005–2015) was a New Zealand reality series, screening on TV2. It visited New Zealand residents disgruntled with their neighbours and tried to help sort problems out. It gave an insight to everything from upset tenants to full-on neighbourhood feuds. In Australia it aired on the Nine Network, first screening on 29 May 2007.

== Broadcasting standards breach ==
According to a report on Stuff, an episode of the show was believed to have breached broadcasting standards.
