= The First 48 =

American TV series

- Genre: Documentary; News magazine
- Narrated by: Dion Graham
- Country of origin: United States
- Original language: English
- No. of seasons: 23
- No. of episodes: 465 (list of episodes)

Production
- Executive producers: David Eilenberg; Wendy Greene; Elaine Frontain Bryant; Peter Tarshis; Laura Fleury
- Camera setup: Multi-camera
- Running time: 42 minutes
- Production companies: ITV Entertainment (Note: Known as Grenada America from seasons 1–7, and ITV Studios America from seasons 8-18.); Trifecta Entertainment & Media (syndication)

Original release
- Network: A&E
- Release: June 3, 2004 – present

Related
- The First 48: Missing Persons; The Killer Speaks

The First 48 is an American documentary news magazine television series on A&E filmed in various cities in the United States, offering an insider's look at the real-life world of homicide investigators. While the series often follows the investigations to their end, it usually focuses on their first 48 hours, hence the title.

Each episode picks one or more homicides in different cities, covering each alternately, showing how detectives use forensic evidence, look outs, witness interviews, and other advanced investigative techniques to identify suspects. While most cases are solved within the first 48 hours, some go on days, weeks, months or even years after the first 48.

The series was nominated for a Distinguished Documentary Achievement Award in the Continuing Series category by the International Documentary Association. By season 6, The First 48 had become the highest-rated non-fiction justice series on television and had gained critical acclaim along with controversy. The season 8 episode "Gone", which aired on January 1, 2009, garnered a domestic audience of 2.3 million viewers, becoming the series' most-watched episode at the time. In Season 4, the series began producing and airing episodes in high definition.

== Title sequence ==
Until the first episode of the 12th season, the opening title sequence featured the conceptual statement "For homicide detectives, the clock starts ticking the moment they are called. Their chance of solving a murder is cut in half if they don't get a lead within the first 48 hours." The original soundtrack, opening title theme and dark ambient sound design for the overall program was composed by Chuck Hammer (2004–2006). Later composers included Brian and Justin Deming (2006–2008) and Paul Brill (2008–2018), who continued with a combination of dark ambient music integrated with sound design.

== Episodes ==
Season	Episodes	Originally released	
Season	Episodes	First released	Last released
1	13	June 3, 2004	November 18, 2004
2	13	January 6, 2005	August 11, 2005
3	12	October 6, 2005	March 2, 2006
4	19	June 15, 2006	December 28, 2006
5	24	January 11, 2007	September 20, 2007
6	18	October 11, 2007	April 10, 2008
7	18	May 15, 2008	December 9, 2008
8	24	January 1, 2009	September 15, 2009
9	24	January 14, 2010	August 12, 2010
10	23	September 30, 2010	April 7, 2011
11	20	May 12, 2011	January 19, 2012
12	23	March 8, 2012	October 11, 2012
13	17	November 15, 2012	June 6, 2013
14	16	August 8, 2013	December 27, 2013
15	23	February 28, 2014	November 17, 2014
16	14	January 1, 2015	May 21, 2015
17	30	November 5, 2015	September 5, 2016
18	22	December 1, 2016	August 3, 2017
19	28	October 19, 2017	October 25, 2018
20	17	January 10, 2019	May 16, 2019
21	54	January 1, 2020	August 26, 2021
22	23	October 21, 2021	September 8, 2022
23	17	November 3, 2022	August 17, 2023
24	10	January 11, 2024	April 11, 2024

== Spin-offs ==
"After the First 48" title card

The series has several follow-up episodes entitled "After the First 48"—detailing the trials of those accused in previous episodes—and the aftermath of victims' survivors. The First 48: Missing Persons follows the same story format as the original series. "The Killer Speaks" depicts convicted felons as they describe their crimes through their first-hand accounts. "The First 48 Presents Critical Minutes" looks back at some of the most unforgettable moments in the series’ history. Hosted by former First 48 detectives, each episode presents different cases previously featured on the show, all with a common theme such as “The Case That Haunts Me,” “Heat of the Moment,” “Shocking Confessions,” “Rookie Detectives,” “Women of Homicide,” and “Caught on Camera.”

"Critical Minutes" is also a spin off from The First 48 Hours.

== Reception ==
The First 48 has received generally positive reviews from television critics. Linda Stasi of the New York Post called it, "Riveting." Ken Tucker of Yahoo News wrote, "Addictive."

== Controversy ==
On November 18, 2009, 21-year-old Taiwan Smart of Miami was charged with two counts of second-degree murder of his two roommates in Little Haiti. His story aired later as an episode titled "Inside Job." Evidence later established that police made important mistakes in their investigation. Additionally, The First 48 misrepresented a key witness' statement on the program. Smart was released in June 2011 and has since sued the city of Miami for false imprisonment. The episode, which originally aired on July 15, 2010, continues to air without correction. In 2014, the city of Miami announced that it would not be renewing its contract with A&E, ending the filming of any future episodes of The First 48 there.

On May 16, 2010, 7-year-old Aiyana Jones of Detroit was shot and killed during a Special Weapons and Tactics (SWAT) raid that was recorded by The First 48 cameras. Detroit SWAT units raided the duplex while searching for a homicide suspect. On October 5, 2011, prosecutors charged the Detroit police officer with the involuntary manslaughter of Jones. Allison Howard, an A&E Television Network camera operator filming that night, was charged with perjury and obstruction of justice after lying under oath. She pleaded no contest to obstruction of justice and was sentenced to two years of probation.

On December 16, 2015, Shawn Peterson pled guilty to manslaughter for the triple murder of his ex-girlfriend, Christine George, her son, Leonard and her daughter, Trisa in the Gentilly neighborhood of New Orleans. Peterson's defense attorneys argued that producers from The First 48 withheld video evidence that could have exonerated their client. A judge rejected the motion but conceded that the show did complicate the case. In 2016, the city of New Orleans announced that it would be ending its contract with A&E, ending any future productions of The First 48 or Nightwatch, another A&E show set in New Orleans. On November 6, 2020, it was announced that filming for Nightwatch would resume in New Orleans after a three-year hiatus, but no such announcement was made for The First 48.
