= Crash Investigation Unit =

- Presented by: Damian Walshe-Howling
- Country of origin: Australia
- No. of episodes: 21

Production
- Producer: Rachel Antony
- Running time: 30 minutes (including commercials); 60 minutes (including commercials; 1 episode)
- Production company: Greenstone TV

Original release
- Network: Seven Network
- Release: 27 August 2008 – 25 July 2011

Related
- SCU: Serious Crash Unit

Crash Investigation Unit is an Australian factual television series on the Seven Network hosted by Damian Walshe-Howling. The series premiered on 27 August 2008.

== About The Show ==
The series follows the Metropolitan Crash Investigation Unit in Sydney to uncover the causes behind a car crash. The program is similar to New Zealand's SCU: Serious Crash Unit, which has previously aired on Seven to strong ratings.

On 22 September 2008, Channel Seven confirmed it had commissioned a second series of Crash Investigation Unit.

== Episodes ==
Series	Episodes	Originally released	
Series	Episodes	First released	Last released
1	9	27 August 2008	22 October 2008
2	12	3 March 2010	25 July 2011

=== Season 1 (2008) ===
No. overall	No. in season	Title	Original release date
1	1	"Redfern"	27 August 2008
A motorcyclist is killed in a collision at a busy intersection. But when the other vehicle leaves the scene, Crash Investigators must go searching for their suspect.
2	2	"Marsden Park"	3 September 2008
A grandmother leaves her local bingo hall, but she will never make it home; the lives of a young man and a truck driver are irrevocably changed as a result.
3	3	"Kogarah"	10 September 2008
A woman sends her car hurtling down a footpath, bowling over a dozen innocent pedestrians. The Crash Investigation Unit sifts through the carnage on a busy Sydney street looking for answers to this nightmarish crash.
4	4	"Summer Hill"	17 September 2008
A young driver is unlikely to survive after a late night crash that kills his passenger. With the help of extraordinary CCTV footage, the CIU explore what could have caused his car to spin out of control.
5	5	"M5"	24 September 2008
While rush hour commuters fight traffic trying to get home, one man is fighting for his life after a pile-up in Sydney’s M5 tunnel. The C.I.U is under pressure to map the underground scene as quickly as possible to get the road re-opened, but with seven vehicles involved, it’s not easy.
6	6	"Fairfield"	1 October 2008
A seemingly straightforward crash is not as it seems when a child is severely injured. The Crashies help solve the mystery by replicating the accident at the RTA’s specialist Crash Lab.
7	7	"Jennifer Franco"	8 October 2008
Jennifer Franco is struck by a taxi in the early hours of 20 February 2007 on Gwawley Parade, Miranda. She sustains critical head and limb injuries, as well as psychological trauma as a result of the crash.
8	8	"Auburn"	15 October 2008
A cyclist has little or no chance against an 11-tonne truck, so when a young father is killed riding near his home, the Crash Unit must piece together events leading up to the tragedy.
9	9	"Haberfield"	22 October 2008
A van inexplicably crosses a median strip into the path of oncoming traffic, with devastating consequences. The C.I.U explore whether it was human or mechanical error that caused the crash.

=== Season 2 (2010–11) ===
No. overall	No. in season	Title	Original release date
10	1	"Not My Time to Go"	3 March 2010
One of Kylie Minogue's old friends dies in a car crash believed to have been caused by a drunk driver
11	2	"Driving Lesson"	10 March 2010
Police investigate the death of a teenager who died in a car crash while out joyriding, with some claiming that texting at the wheel was the reason for the tragedy.
12	3	"Normanhurst"	17 March 2010
Police try to find out who was responsible for a crash that resulted in the death of a woman who, having become a grandmother for the first time, was en route to a baby shower.
13	4	"Budgewoi (Left for Dead)"	24 March 2010
Police consider whether a driver fled the scene of a car crash that left his best friend in a serious condition.
14	5	"Kenthurst (On the Verge)"	31 March 2010
Police become suspicious of a man who tried to assist the passengers of a car that careered off a rural trail.
15	6	"Punchbowl (Light Wait)"	7 April 2010
Two young drivers blame each other for a collision that occurred on a Saturday night.
16	7	"MT Druitt (Industrial Dispute)"	14 April 2010
A driver claims to have no memory of being in a car crash that killed his colleague, as he awakes from a coma.
17	8	"Richmond Road (B-Double Trouble)"	21 April 2010
A driver claims to have no memory of being in a car crash that killed his colleague, as he awakes from a coma.
18	9	"Spencer (Middle of the Road)"	27 April 2010
Police try to work out who was to blame for a rural crash in which a motorbike split in two.
19	10	"Pymble (Flyover)"	11 July 2011
Sergeant Peter Jenkins steps in after a five-car pile-up results in a young man's death.
20	11	"Wedderburn (Causeway)"	18 July 2011
The unit's Grant Holman uses all his professionalism when, following an accident involving two vehicles, the distraught sister of a dead driver disputes the other driver's story.
21	12	"Kurrajong"	25 July 2011
Documentary following New South Wales police officers as they try to uncover the cause of fatal incidents.
