= SCU: Serious Crash Unit =

- Genre: Factual Television Series
- Written by: Sharon Bennett, Peter Clews, Jenny Williams, Paul Hagan, Nicola Griffin
- Directed by: Sharon Bennett, Peter Clews, Jenny Williams, Paul Hagan, Candace McNabb
- Narrated by: Shane Cortese, Craig Hall
- Composer: Liquid Studios
- Country of origin: New Zealand
- Original language: English
- No. of seasons: 7
- No. of episodes: 49

Production
- Executive producer: Andrea Lamb
- Producers: Peter Clews, Jenny Williams
- Production locations: Auckland, New Zealand
- Editors: Phil Holt, Jon Kirk
- Camera setup: OPC, multi single-camera crews
- Running time: 22 minutes (approx)
- Production company: Greenstone TV Ltd - www.greenstonetv.com

Original release
- Network: TV2, TV One (current)
- Release: 2 April 2004 – 26 May 2015

Related
- Crash Investigation Unit

SCU: Serious Crash Unit is a New Zealand documentary series that aired on TV2. The show was cancelled after seven seasons.

== Overview ==
SCU: Serious Crash Unit follows a New Zealand Police-based Auckland Serious Crash Unit as they investigate crashes and examine the evidence found at the crash scene to find out what happened, and what caused the accident.

== Episodes ==
=== Season 1 ===
No. overall	No. in season	Title	Original release date
1	1	"Albany/Novotel"	2003
Two vehicles are destroyed in a fatal head-on accident on Albany Bridge.
2	2	"Okura/Stanway"	2003
The SCU investigates a crashed four-wheel-drive.
3	3	"Simpson Rd/Southern Motorway"	2003
Two West Auckland factory workers get into a crash on Simpson Road in Ranui.
4	4	"Windy/Wellsford"	2003
A man loses control of his vehicle on his way to visit his children, and the SCU suspect his brakes may have been at fault.
5	5	"Whangaparaoa/joe Dee"	2003
The SCU are called to two crashes on Whangaparaoa Road.
6	6	"Bush/Dome"	2003
A young motorcyclist is killed in a collision with a truck.
7	7	"Upper Harbour/titrangi"	2003
A bus veers out of control in Titirangi with fatalities.

=== Season 2 ===
No. overall	No. in season	Title	Original release date
8	1	"Wainui Road"	2005
The police investigate the death of 27-year old Hamish MacDonald driving home from a night out with friends.
9	2	"Golf Road"	2005
The police investigate a fatal crash that kills three people.
10	3	"Lincoln/Newtown Road"	2005
The police investigate why a car ploughed through an intersection hitting another vehicle and critically injuring the driver, who is left in critical condition.
11	4	"Kahikatea"	2005
The police investigate the death of a young man whose car has come off the road as he was heading home to a family emergency.
12	5	"Oriel/Coatsville"	2005
The police investigate a crash where a car left the road and hit a tree.
13	6	TBA	2005
...

=== Season 3 ===
No. overall	No. in season	Title	Original release date
14	1	"Te Hana"	2006
15	2	"Muriwai/Rua Rd"	2006
16	3	TBA	2006
17	4	TBA	2006
18	5	TBA	2006
19	6	TBA	2006
20	7	TBA	2006

=== Season 4 ===
No. overall	No. in season	Title	Original release date
21	1	TBA	2008
22	2	TBA	2008
23	3	TBA	2008
24	4	TBA	2008
25	5	TBA	2008
26	6	TBA	2008
27	7	TBA	2008
28	8	TBA	2008

=== Season 5 ===
No. overall	No. in season	Title	Original release date
29	1	"Mangatawhiri"	6 June 2011
The SCU investigate a crash where a truck driver is killed after he swerves to avoid crashing into a line of traffic on a busy state highway.
30	2	"Wellsford"	13 June 2011
Two women are killed and three women are seriously injured after a multivehicle high speed crash south of Wellsford.
31	3	"Pinewoods"	20 June 2011
The SCU investigate a serious crash where a rugby star is killed when he is thrown from a car as it plunges over a 25-metre cliff at a camping ground north of Auckland.
32	4	"Hobsonville"	27 June 2011
The SCU investigate a fatal crash after a motorcyclist, who has just finished building his classic motorbike, is killed when he tries to avoid a car at an intersection.
33	5	"Mill Road"	4 July 2011
The SCU investigate a crash where the mother of three young children is seriously injured when she swerves into the path of an oncoming truck.
34	6	"Wily Road"	11 July 2011
A man is killed when his BMW fails to take a bend, rolling six times down a hill, leaving his partner and young daughter with moderate injuries.
35	7	TBA	2011
...

=== Season 6 ===
No. overall	No. in season	Title	Original release date
36	1	"Papakura"	22 January 2013
The SCU investigates a single vehicle crash at a major intersection after reports of road rage earlier in the evening.
37	2	"Lincoln Road"	2012
...
38	3	"Kingseat"	19 February 2013
The SCU investigate a fatality at an intersection that has been the site of many crashes.
39	4	"Kaiaua"	2012
...
40	5	TBA	2012
...
41	6	TBA	2012
...
42	7	TBA	2012
...

=== Season 7 ===
No. overall	No. in season	Title	Original release date
43	1	"Kingseat"	29 July 2014
The SCU investigate a double fatality at an intersection.
44	2	"Port Waikato"	4 August 2014
The SCU investigate a crash where an Australian tourist is killed while on a quad bike tour.
45	3	"Birdwood"	12 August 2014
The SCU investigate a fatal crash after a motorcyclist is killed.
46	4	"Maramarua"	19 August 2014
The SCU investigate a crash where an elderly woman is killed on a highway after colliding with a truck kilometres from home.
47	5	TBA	2014
Two young women are killed and three are seriously injured after a multi-vehicle high speed crash south of Wellsford.
48	6	TBA	2014
...
49	7	TBA	2014
...

== Broadcasting ==
The following list is ordered by the date of the series premiere.

Country	TV Network(s)	Series Premiere	Weekly Schedule	Status
New Zealand	TV2		N/A	All episodes aired
Australia	Channel Seven	17 March 2008	Monday 8:00pm	All episodes aired

== Ratings ==
=== Australia ===
In Australia, SCU: Serious Crash Unit was watched by 1.4 million viewers in its premiere episode, and received similar ratings in its second week. In its premiere week in Australia, SCU: Serious Crash Unit was the third most watched program in the five mainland state capitals.

The second series premiered Monday 8:00pm at 1.2 million viewers, and ratings remained between 1.2 and 1.7 million viewers, following a strong lead in from Border Security: Australia's Front Line.
