= Aussie Pickers =

Australian reality television series

- Genre: Reality
- Based on: American Pickers
- Presented by: Lucas Callaghan and Adam McDonald
- Country of origin: Australia
- Original language: English
- No. of seasons: 2
- No. of episodes: 16

Production
- Production company: Shine Australia

Original release
- Network: A&E
- Release: 9 May 2013 – 30 September 2014

Related
- American Pickers; Cash Cowboys

Aussie Pickers is an Australian reality television series which premiered on A&E on 9 May 2013. It is an Australian adaptation of American series American Pickers. The show follows Lucas Callaghan and Adam McDonald as they travel around Australia, buying ("picking") antiques and collectibles. They look through attics, backyards and sheds in the search for forgotten relics.

== Development ==
The series was first commissioned by Foxtel (owner of A&E) on 12 November 2012, to be a 10-part series produced by Shine Australia.

On 10 December 2012, it was announced that Lucas Callaghan and Adam McDonald would host the series, as well as stating the series had been reduced from 10 episodes to 8.

In February 2014, multiple regional websites and newspapers advertised that Aussie Pickers were looking for individuals to nominate whether they were interested in participating in the series, with filming of season two to begin shortly and to air on A&E later in 2014. It was later announced the second season would premiere on 14 August 2014, however, the series premiered two days earlier on 12 August 2014.

== Presenters ==
Lucas Callaghan is an Australian collector and dealer in 20th century design Callaghan also stars in a 2019 spin-off series Road to Riches, where he is invited into homes to identify household valuable antiques and collectables. Adam McDonald's area of expertise is 20th-century and industrial antiques, and his work has been reviewed on the ABC television program Auction Room.

== Episodes ==
=== Series overview ===
Season	Episodes	Originally released	
Season	Episodes	First released	Last released
1	8	9 May 2013	27 June 2013
2	8	12 August 2014	30 September 2014

=== Season 1 (2013) ===
No. overall	No. in season	Title	Original release date	Overnight Australian viewers
1	1	"Episode 1"	9 May 2013	72,000
2	2	"Episode 2"	16 May 2013	58,000
3	3	"Episode 3"	23 May 2013	N/A
4	4	"Episode 4"	30 May 2013	45,000
5	5	"Episode 5"	6 June 2013	N/A
6	6	"Episode 6"	13 June 2013	N/A
7	7	"Episode 7"	20 June 2013	N/A
8	8	"Episode 8"	27 June 2013	48,000

=== Season 2 (2014) ===
No. overall	No. in season	Title	Original release date	Overnight Australian viewers
9	1	"Laurie's Lair"	12 August 2014	67,000
10	2	"Sheldon's Shack"	19 August 2014	42,000
11	3	"The Red Indian"	26 August 2014	N/A
12	4	"The Butcher's Shed"	2 September 2014	51,000
13	5	"Kiwi Pickers"	9 September 2014	N/A
14	6	"Mad Max"	16 September 2014	53,000
15	7	"The Grave Vault"	23 September 2014	N/A
16	8	"Spog's Shed"	30 September 2014	N/A

== Home media ==
DVD name	Format	Ep #	Discs	Region 4 (Australia)	Special features	Distributors
Aussie Pickers (Season 1)	DVD	8	2	2 January 2014	None	Beyond Home Entertainment
Aussie Pickers (Season 2)	DVD	8	2	1 April 2015	None	Beyond Home Entertainment
