= Kutonen (TV channel) =

- Country: Finland
- Broadcast area: 95% of Finland
- Headquarters: Helsinki, Finland; London, United Kingdom

Programming
- Language: Finnish
- Picture format: 1080i HDTV

Ownership
- Owner: Warner Bros. Discovery EMEA (Warner Bros. Discovery)
- Sister channels: TV5; Frii; TLC (Finland)

History
- Launched: 1 September 2012 (Kutonen); 11 November 2004 (The Voice); 12 March 2004 (Viisi)
- Replaced: Viisi (March 2004 – November 2004); The Voice TV (November 2004 – September 2012)

Links
- Website: Official website

Availability

Terrestrial
- Digital terrestrial: Channel 10 (HD); Channel 30

Kutonen (Sixth) is a Finnish general entertainment channel that replaced the music-video oriented The Voice TV in September 2012. Kutonen is very closely related to its Danish counterpart 6'eren, sharing visual branding and programming as well as connections to other brands owned and operated by SBS in other European countries.

== History ==
=== The start of interactive television (2003–2004) ===
In 2003, a Finnish multimedia corporation called Vizor Media Ltd. bid for a station in the digital terrestrial television network with a winning bid, putting aside bids from six other companies (including the country's largest media groups MTV Media and Nelonen Media). After winning the auction for the channel space, Vizor announced it would launch its station some time during 2004. Later that year they announced the name and the profile of the channel: Vitonen was due to become Finland's first cross media channel, widely utilizing the benefits of wireless technology and allowing viewers to participate in the broadcasts online, with their mobile phones and later, with the red button of one's set-top box (of which the latter never happened on this particular station). Regional broadcasts were also commenced to market products and services locally and more cost-efficiently. Test broadcasts were launched in December 2003 in the Otaniemi campus of the then-Helsinki University of Technology by the state-owned VTT Technical Research Centre of Finland. Previously that year various private companies also took part in an auction for the contract to provide red button services for Vitonen. The winning bidder, Icareus Ltd., started MHP tests in Otaniemi simultaneously with the DVB-T tests in co-operation with VTT.

The tests took three months to complete and on 12 March 2004 at 5 PM, the channel finally launched itself into the televisions of the digital nation on DTT channel 15. In the weeks preceding the launch, the name of the channel was simplified from Vitonen to Viisi. The launch was preceded by a 10-hour countdown accompanied with white noise from 7:00 am that morning until the final hour. For the last ten minutes the precise seconds of the countdown were accompanied by the Greenwich Time Signal. At the point where one minute was left of the countdown, the decreasing numbers were joined by the Apollo 11 countdown sequence. At the 30 second mark, the first song of the station (namely Ready to Go by Republica) started to play and at "lift-off" – as it was called in the media – an explosion-like transition launched into the music video of Ready to Go. The first program officially transmitted on Viisi was an edition of the channel's music program Rumba.tv spanning the whole launch night. Its first months' programming consisted of interactive programs, music videos, movie/music/media magazines, low-budget import shows, teleshopping, infomercials and (mainly regional) chat shows. Viisi contributed to TV advertising in Finland with overhead banners on top of broadcasts, adverts incorporated into station DOGs and showing classified MMS ads sent by viewers during normal breaks.

=== The Voice era (2004–2008) ===
The logo of The Voice from 2004 to the present day.

All the way from the launch of Viisi, its owner Vizor Media had close ties with the pan-European multimedia corporation SBS Broadcasting Group, mainly due to having bought most of its staff from SBS. The co-operation included simulcasting SBS-owned radio station Kiss FM's morning show Aamutiimi daily from 5 am onwards until the beginning of actual programs. SBS also handled the selling of Viisi's advertising time on behalf of Vizor. In August 2004, SBS, which already owned multiple radio stations in Finland and other Nordic countries, announced it would expand its services to television by buying Viisi from Vizor Media. After buying the channel, the new owner rebranded it as a 24/7 music-oriented station called The Voice, launching the new brand on 11 November 2004. Before launching on television, The Voice had been a strong and popular radio brand for 20 years in Sweden and Denmark. A local version of The Voice TV was launched three months before the Finnish version in Denmark, Swedish and Norwegian versions followed shortly afterwards. At first it only showed a mix of music videos and adverts, but five months after the launch, in February 2005, hosts appeared on the channel for the first time as well as did topical magazines. It aimed to be a largely influential party in the Finnish youth culture and it also aimed to be its mouthpiece by broadcasting programming for the youth, made by the youth – a thing no other channel in the country had ever done before. Initially covering only southern and western parts of the country, it grew to be a national station in a very small period of time. It went on to be one of the most popular digital channels in the country.

In the beginning of 2007, the SBS-owned radio station Kiss FM (also known as Uusi Kiss) was rebranded as The Voice, completing the so-called triangle of SBS's media platforms in Finland. According to SBS, "having a television channel, a radio station and a comprehensive website had a positive effect on the usage of all services". This includes television, which drew many new viewers to The Voice TV thanks to the co-branding. The effectiveness of the co-branding is debatable due to the fact that another SBS-owned radio station, Radio City, lost its broadcast license in the 2006 bid. The station was very much loved and topped the listening charts of the Helsinki area for many months of its last year on air – some shows of the station were even simulcasted on The Voice TV. After the ending of Radio City, only occasional listeners found their way to Kiss FM, which overall weakened SBS's foothold on Finnish radio. Nevertheless, The Voice kept going strong as a multimedia brand and got more television viewers than ever.

=== Return of Viisi (2008–2012) ===
C More Entertainment, a major player in Nordic pay television, was owned by SBS Broadcasting Group until 2009. SBS wanted to attract more subscribers to the Canal+ channels by any means necessary. These means included turning the channels free-to-air for a few weekends each year, allowing the free viewers to get a glimpse of what Canal+ had to offer. After a while SBS realized that their message didn't necessarily get to all viewers and being desperate to get subscriber figures up, they decided to utilize their free-to-air channels for promoting purposes. In Finland, Canal+ had the exclusive rights to Finnish national football team's qualifier matches for FIFA World Cup 2010 and their only free-to-air television channel in the country at the time was The Voice. Sports did not suite the channel's profile, so they decided to launch a general entertainment block called TV Viisi, showing cost-effective import programmes amongst sports and selected movies from the Canal+ Film line up. TV Viisi was launched on 10 September 2008 at 8 PM with the FIFA World Cup 2010 qualifier Finland v Germany and scored the most viewers a digital channel in Finland had ever achieved: 242,000 simultaneous viewers according to overnight ratings, which makes up 11% of all television viewers at the time. The viewer record was only broken by another football qualifier on TV Viisi between Finland and Russia on 10 June 2009, when 286,000 viewers were watching the game.

TV Viisi's entertainment block was originally transmitted from 8 PM to 11 PM with The Voice covering the rest of the hours, but in the beginning of 2009 the hours were extended to five with programs starting at 6 PM. The changes in the schedule provoked considerable displeasure among loyal viewers of The Voice, who found music videos a great alternative to the prime time line-ups of other channels. The viewership decreased drastically during the first year of the new arrangement, when over half of the viewers left.

The channel place stayed shared between the two blocks for a couple of years and among all the hatred rose a new community of viewers increasing the viewer figures of TV Viisi almost back to the levels of The Voice's heyday. The same arrangement continued all the way until 1 April 2011, when TV Viisi moved to its own channel and The Voice turned back into a 24-hour music video station. Even with The Voice reverting to its original profile, TV Viisi also started its own music block broadcast outside regular hours, called The Voice 5. The change was welcomed back by The Voice's former loyal viewers, but TV Viisi kept growing faster than any other television channel in Finland. The Voice stayed as a 24-hour music channel for the rest of the year, but in January 2012 it started another comedy block in prime time showing classic comedy shows like Seinfeld and The Nanny, but this time retaining its own identity for the time being.

=== Rebranding as Kutonen (2012–present) ===
SBS again sought to increase viewing figures by attempting to broaden the target audience of The Voice with a prime time comedy block Me rakastamme komediaa (We love comedy), but viewers did not respond well. The nation had been craving for a 24-hour music video station also broadcasting music in prime time for the three years before The Voice finally reverted to a music-only station in 2011. However, SBS continued the comedy block despite viewer dissatisfaction. The Voice was no more the same channel in the eyes of the viewers and a rebrand was known to be only a matter of time. When the name change to Kutonen and changing the profile to focus on men was announced only 15 days before change was due to happen in August 2012, there was little to no opposition found anywhere. The Voice stayed as an independent brand broadcasting outside regular hours on both TV Viisi and Kutonen, but changed its music profile to pop and rap music only.

== Logo and identities ==
Kutonen's first logo from 2012 until 2015

Kutonen's second logo from 2015 until 2024

== Programming ==
=== Current ===
- Dog the Bounty Hunter
- Finnish First Division ice hockey
- Finnish Premier League football
- Star Trek: The Next Generation
- JCVD: Behind Closed Doors
- Expedition Impossible
- Beauty and the Geek
- Sunday Night Movies
- Friday Night Movies
- The Naked Truth
- Just for Laughs
- Operation Repo
- Swamp People
- Coyote Ugly
- Twin Peaks
- Dr. Steve-O
- The Nanny
- Leverage
- Seinfeld
- Mobbed
- Nanny
- Inked
- Cops

=== Current The Voice programming ===
- Me rakastamme musiikkia

We Love Music. The main music block of the station with various styles of music.

- Voicen uutuudet

Brand new at Voice. Formerly known as New4You.

- The Voice Top Ten

The weekly top ten list program of the station, where the songs included in the list are chosen by the station staff.

- 100% Rock

As the title says, only rock and heavy metal videos are played in this program block. The program was widely criticized by the pentecostal movements of Finland in its early days for allegedly promoting Satanist attitudes, even though the program has never contained any Satanist music at all. The whole channel was even boycotted for a time by all kinds of Christian denominations due to "glorifying secularism and sacrilegious attitudes and spoiling the lives of young, innocent children and the youth of Finland" and the boycott was backed with the classic claims of backmasking having revealed hidden messages. At the time it was a widely believed stereotype that all metal and rock music was of the Satanist attitude, though these beliefs were mostly broken after the Eurovision Song Contest victory of Finnish heavy metal band Lordi in 2006, which made metal music mainstream.

- Parasta Suomesta

The Best of Finnish. An hour of Finnish music videos from all genres, both old and new music.

- Pop Hop

Formerly known as Hop'nB. The block consists of Hip hop, pop hop and rhythm and blues music.

- Retro

Formerly known as Deja Voice. The program varies in length, with one half-hour block focusing on the music of one particular year.

- The Voice of Summer

Summer themed music block replacing Me rakastamme musiikkia from June to August.

- The Voice of Xmas

Based on the same concept as The Voice of Summer, this block plays Christmas music of all genres. Also replaces Me rakastamme musiikkia in December.

- Heräämö

Recovery Room. The weekday morning show of The Voice running from 6 am to 9 am, hosted by a team of five comedians also simulcasted on The Voice radio network throughout the country. Based on its Swedish sister channel's concept VAKNA!. A 'best of' program also airs on the weekends.

- Latauslista

The official Finnish download chart program, with only selected songs from the Top 200 shown and the Top 40 shown in full.

- Killer Karaoke

As the title suggests, a karaoke program with all genres of music. The show is accompanied by an interactive site, where users are encouraged to send clips of themselves singing songs featured on the station's playlist. The user also has the ability to share their takes on these songs with their friends on various social networking services and the most popular takes end up on television.

- The Voicen uudenvuoden lähtölaskenta

The Voice New Year Countdown. The annual 24-hour countdown of the year's top hits is most likely the largest crowd magnet of the station. The base count of the countdown is commonly 500, whereas the last two digits of the ending year are added to the base count (e.g. in 2009 the number of songs was 509 and in 2011 it was 511). The broadcast ends with the first ranking song of the year at usually five minutes to midnight, when the signal cuts to a live broadcast of the Helsinki Senate Square's new year festivities.

=== Past The Voice programming ===
- KPS

A weekday daytime program hosted by Kristiina Komulainen, Heikki Paasonen and Johannes Saukko, the first letters of the hosts' surnames make up the title of the show. Replaced by Voicela in the autumn of 2007.

- The Voice in the Mix

A large interactive music video megamix, where the next song of the megamix voted by SMS and mixed into the previous one by a live DJ. Usually shown at late nights, the program was a common raid target for the Finnish imageboard Kuvalauta.

- Top 5@5

Summing up the top five songs of the day voted by The Voice's online community at 5 PM every weekday.

- Voicela

A daytime comedy talk show hosted by Jukka Rossi, Juuso Mäkirinne and Tea Khalifa, that at first ran for 1.5 hours. In September 2008 it was reduced to only one hour and Khalifa quit hosting the show.

- POP

A weekly topical magazine hosted by Jussi Mäntysaari. It ran for half an hour, often consisting purely of interviews with musicians. After the magazine was cancelled, Mäntysaari went on to host a show of the same type to the same corporation's commercial radio station Radio City, simply titled Ohjelma (or The Program).

- The Voice Party

Live rave parties hosted all around the country and broadcast live on television on Friday, Saturday and Sunday nights.

- Your Voice

The program consisted of an editor doing vox pops around the streets of Helsinki and asking for music requests to fill on television.

- 1 artisti, 3 hittiä

Interviews with international and domestic musicians, playing three hit songs by that particular artist amidst the interview sequences.

=== Past Viisi (2004) programming ===
- Rumba

The main music program of the station, made in co-operation with the Rumba magazine. Mainly hosted by Tea Khalifa, the program was broadcast from Lasipalatsi in central Helsinki and had studio guests every day.

- Hohto

A daily half-hour show focusing on rating new movie releases and television series. Also interviewed people in the movie industry.

- ChatGalleria

An SMS chat show made in co-operation with social networking site IRC-Galleria, which allowed users to connect their telephones with their IRC nicknames and chat with other users of the service around the country.

- Huuto

An auctioning program made in co-operation with online auctioning site Huuto.net, where the host of the program pinpointed selected interesting items while other items were running through the screen. New bids were typed to the screen in real time using the Vidiprinter system, made famous by the BBC in their football show Final Score.

- KissTV

A simulcast of radio station Kiss FM accompanied by a live camera feed from the studio and an SMS chat. Mostly used as a breakfiller when no other programming was available and was shown regularly each morning from 5 am to 10 am to simulcast the Kiss FM morning show Aamutiimi.

- Peliforum

A weekly magazine consisting of video game news and reviews. Repeated every day of the week.
