= Jonne (name) =

Jonne is a Finnish variant of the given name John. Notable people with the name include:

- Jonne Aaron (born 1983), Finnish singer
- Jonne Halttunen (born 1985), Finnish rally co-driver
- Jonne Hjelm (born 1988), Finnish footballer
- Jonne Järvelä (born 1974), Finnish musician
- Jonne Kemppinen (born 1981), Finnish footballer
- Jonne Kunnas (born 1992), Finnish football coach
- Jonne Lindblom (born 1983), Finnish football agent
- Jonne Valtonen (born 1976), Finnish composer
- Jonne Virtanen (born 1988), Finnish ice hockey player

It is also the surname of Uruguayan footballer Luis Jonne.

== Internet meme and slang ==
Starting in the early 2010s, the Finnish slang word jonne (pl. jonnet) has been used to refer to a stereotypical teenage boy who behaves embarrassingly, often rides a moped and drinks energy drinks, especially Euroshopper Energy Drink ("ES"), from which the term ES-jonne is derived. The word originally came from the name of Jonne Jyrylä, the creator of the Finnish website Jonneweb, and the first "jonne memes" on the Finnish imageboard Kuvalauta were based on a teenage photo of Finnish rapper Atte Toikka, which was originally posted on the Finnish social networking website IRC-Galleria. Since at least the early 2020s, the slang word veeti (pl. veetit), derived from the Finnish name Veeti, has similarly been used to refer to a new generation of teenage boys.
