= The Voice TV =

- Type: Broadcast television network
- Country: UK, London, Corporate Headquarters
- Availability: Bulgaria, Denmark, Finland, Sweden, Norway
- Founded: 2004-2012 Scandinavia, Since 2006 Bulgaria
- Owner: ProSiebenSat.1 Media
- Official website: www.thevoicetv.com

The Voice TV is a network of music television channels owned by ProSiebenSat.1 Media (formally SBS Broadcasting Group). Previously broadcast in Finland (2004-2012), Denmark (2004-2012), Norway (2004-2012) and Sweden (2004-2008). In October 2006 the channel began broadcasting in Bulgaria.

== See also ==
- The Voice TV Bulgaria
- The Voice TV Danmark
- The Voice TV Finland
- The Voice TV Norway
- The Voice TV Sweden
