= Kiss FM (Finland) =

Finland
- Frequency: See list

Programming
- Language: Finnish
- Format: Hot AC / CHR

Ownership
- Owner: SBS Broadcasting Group

History
- First air date: March 9, 1995
- Last air date: 2007

Kiss FM was a Finnish commercial radio station established in 1995 and owned by SBS Broadcasting Group. It was renewed and renamed to Uusi Kiss by the end of 2005 due to an announcer scandal. In 2007, it was discontinued and replaced by The Voice.

The station's target group were people between 15 and 35 years of age (formats Hot AC and CHR). It was known for its Internet chat room and prank calls.

== Frequencies ==
- Helsinki 104.6 MHz
- Turku 98.7 MHz
- Tampere 89.6 MHz
- Oulu 101.4 MHz
- Lahti 105.0 MHz
- Mikkeli 100.5 MHz
- Jyväskylä 101.6 MHz
- Vaasa 104.4 MHz
- Kuopio 93.0 MHz
- Joensuu 87.9 MHz
