= Sulake =

Finnish video game company

Sulake Oy
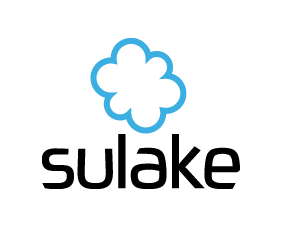
- Sulake logo
- Native name: Sulake Oy
- Company type: Private
- Industry: Social networking Video games
- Founded: 2000
- Founder: Sampo Karjalainen; Aapo Kyrölä
- Headquarters: Helsinki, Finland
- Area served: 11 countries
- Key people: Jyrki Arjanne (CEO) (2017–present)
- Products: • Habbo (2000–present); Bobba Bar (2009–11); Lost Monkey (2011–12); Niko (2012–12) • VMK (2005–08) • Mini Friday (2006–10) • IRC-Galleria (2007–11) • Hotel Hideaway (2018–present)
- Revenue: 78,700,000 US$ (2011)
- Owner: Azerion (100%)
- Number of employees: 281 (January 2026)
- Website: www.sulake.com

Sulake Oy (Finnish pronunciation: [ˈsulɑke]) is a Finnish video game company primarily known for the creation and development of Habbo and Hotel Hideaway games. Sulake’s headquarters are in Helsinki, with design and marketing operations based in London and a user care center located in Madrid.

== History ==
Sulake's original pixelated logo (2000–2003)

In its early days, Sulake developed and experimented with an open source Java based GNU called FUSE Light, an alternative to Macromedia's Shockwave. The key difference between the two technologies was that FUSE Light was designed to run on any operating system, while Shockwave was limited to just macOS and Microsoft Windows. This technology was first demonstrated on Sulake's Mobiles Disco, but it soon came to use on the beta versions of Habbo.

In March 2011, Sulake reported that revenue was up more than 20 percent over 2009, resulting in sales of €56.2 million ($78.7 million). Sulake's EBITDA in 2010 totaled €5.4 million ($7.6 million, 9.5 percent of revenue) and thus significantly improved from the previous year (€0.6 or $0.8 million). Net profit was €1.6 million ($2.3 million). Sulake has also been playing an active role in assisting the police in investigations connected to the theft of online furniture.

In September 2011, Sulake announced Paul LaFontaine as new CEO as the original management team left the company.

In February 2012, it was announced that Sulake will be consolidating some of its manual processes and local operations. In showing the door to 25% of their workforce, Sulake will also close all of their 11 country offices according to the report by Finnish publication Dome.fi.

In June 2012, Sulake received negative press for ongoing sexual behavior allegations on their most successful website, Habbo. Channel 4 News identified that Sulake was allowing users to post pornographic and violent messages - despite the fact that Habbo is targeted at young teenagers. On 13 June 2012, one of the main shareholders, 3i, which held 16 per cent of shares, declared it was pulling out of Sulake shares alongside other investors including Balderton Capital.

In October 2012, it was announced that Sulake would be implementing a second wave of job cuts. A maximum of 60 out of the 90 jobs will go. Negotiations with employees began on 5 November 2012.

In December 2012, it was announced that CEO Paul LaFontaine would be leaving his role after fifteen months.

In January 2013, Sulake announced that Markku Ignatius would replace LaFontaine as acting CEO.

In February 2013, telecommunications company Elisa announced that it was buying Sulake. By the end of the month it will become the biggest shareholder with 85% of the shares.

In April 2013, Antti-Jussi Suominen became the CEO of Sulake. He left his post in January 2017 to join banking startup Holvi.

On 17 May 2018, Elisa finalized the sale of 60% of the shares in Sulake Oy to the Dutch company Orange Games. The value of the deal was not disclosed. Orange Games later merged with the AdTech platform Improve Digital and became known as Azerion. Azerion remains majority stakeholder in Sulake with Elisa remaining a minority stakeholder.

In January 2021, it was reported that Azerion negotiated with Elisa and bought the remaining shares of Sulake. They are now the owners of Sulake Oy.
