= Virtual Magic Kingdom =

2005 video game

- Virtual Magic Kingdom official logo
- Developers: Walt Disney Parks and Resorts; Sulake Corporation
- Publishers: Walt Disney Parks and Resorts
- Designers: Fiona Romeo, Seth Mendelsohn, Jeremy Malillin
- Engine: Adobe Shockwave
- Platforms: Microsoft Windows, Mac OS X
- Release: May 23, 2005
- Genre: Massively multiplayer online game
- Mode: Multiplayer

Virtual Magic Kingdom, also known as VMK, was a massively multiplayer online game developed by Walt Disney Parks and Resorts and Sulake and published by The Walt Disney Company. It was a virtual representation of the Disneyland-style theme parks, containing areas and minigames which were based on real park scenery and attractions. The beta version opened publicly on May 23, 2005, with new lands opening up through 2007.

VMK initially launched as part of the Happiest Celebration on Earth promotional campaign, commemorating Disneyland's 50th anniversary. Despite no long-term intentions, it gained popularity and eventually became a long-term venture on its own. The target audience of the game was children between the ages of 8 and 14, although VMK was designed to be enjoyed by guests of all ages. Due to the young age of the game's target users, it was patrolled by paid staff who watched out for inappropriate behavior and language. Because of the need for human monitors, the time that the game was open had to be limited; it was open to the public daily between 7:00am–10:00pm PST (10:00am–1:00am EST, 3:00pm–6:00am UTC).

Virtual Magic Kingdom was closed by Disney on May 21, 2008. Many fans asked Disney if VMK was going to reopen. This prompted Disney to post a message on the VMK homepage that the game was a promotion, and was closed, and that there were "no plans" to reopen VMK in any form. The VMK homepage now redirects to the main Disney games site.

== History ==
=== Early history (1995–2004) ===
In 1995, Disney Interactive greenlit a pitch from Imagineering art director Terry Dobson to create a CD-ROM adventure game set at a Disney theme park. In this iteration, which was the first to be called Virtual Magic Kingdom, a stylized park would be overrun by villains during a special after-hours visit. The project was overseen by Roger Holzberg. The game was developed from 1996 to 1998, but was ultimately cancelled. The work on the Fantasyland portion was repurposed into the 1999 game Disney's Villains' Revenge.

Holzberg and Dobson reunited at Imagineering, then were recruited separately for a new Parks and Resorts Online unit around 2003. After being introduced to Sulake, who were attempting to expand beyond their breakout service Habbo Hotel (now Habbo), they collaborated on a pitch demo set in Adventureland. According to Holzberg, the new pitch leaned heavily on its value to sell tickets to Disney parks.

=== Launch (2005–2008) ===
The beta version opened publicly on May 23, 2005, with three virtual lands to explore: Main Street, U.S.A., Fantasyland, and Adventureland. This "beta" designation was removed on June 27. The Tomorrowland game area was made available on October 5, and Frontierland opened on December 12. The rest of Tomorrowland opened on April 4, 2006, and New Orleans Square, the final land added, opened on January 8, 2007.

On June 24, 2005, the Parks and Resorts Online team filed a patent for their integration of real-life and virtual theme park rewards in VMK.

=== Closure ===
Disney closed VMK on May 21, 2008, at 1:00 AM EST. Immediately after the press release, changes were made to prevent the creation of any new accounts.

Online petitions were created to attempt to change Disney's decision, and some players attempted to arrange a protest outside of the entrance to Disneyland, and approximately a dozen people showed up. On Thanksgiving weekend of 2008, suspicion arose when emails from VMK's server were sent out saying they were testing the player's account. These emails were proved to be false. Ultimately, these actions had no effect, and VMK was shut down as scheduled. The VMK website was updated with information to quell repeated rumors that the game would be resurrected (and at one point, provided promotional [free] subscriptions for other Disney Online games), but was taken down entirely in November; the VMK URL currently directs users to the "Games" section of Disney.com instead of the VMK homepage.

Holzberg claimed in 2021 that VMK was "cannibalizing" the activity of Toontown Online and other Disney-related online services.

== Gameplay ==
Central Plaza in January 2008, 4 months before the whole game closed.

The Virtual Magic Kingdom consisted of "Disney Lands", each depicted in isometric projection, and each with a distinct theme.

No more than 15 characters could occupy a room at any time. If a player tried to enter a guest room which already contained fifteen characters, they would be put into a queue to wait to enter. A player could request a free "VMK pass" if there were more than five people in the queue for a room; this allowed them to walk around freely in other rooms until it was their turn to enter. The public rooms all had multiple "instances", named after compass directions (such as the "North-East-East" instance), and each instance could have up to fifteen characters in it. When moving around the public rooms, a character would be randomly placed in an instance of a room unless the player checked the "Advanced Mode" box, in which they could select a specific instance for their character to enter.

During October, all the rooms along Main Street were decorated for Halloween. In 2005, the decorations were left up until December; in 2006 and 2007, Christmas décor appeared immediately after Halloween.

Players whose characters met in the same room at the same time could become "friends": one issued an invitation to the other, and if the other accepted, then each player would always be able to see when the other was online and in what game location, and would be able to jump instantly to the other character's location (unless blocked by a 'friends only' flag on the room, the presence of the friend's character within a game, or a 'special entrance' room). Either player could remove someone from their friends list at any time.

== Guest rooms and awards ==
When a player first created their character in the game, they were given one free "guest room", which they could name and decorate with items. If the player was creating their character in a real-life park, then they were given another room (one of each available choice), as a bonus. Several other kinds of rooms were also available; a player could purchase/get them in the game. Players could set some of their items to be movable by their guests, a feature added sometime in late 2007 or early 2008.

In-game shops sold a wide variety of items, such as posters, couches, water fountains, and rugs, which could be used to decorate guest rooms. Some of these items were sold only for a limited time, and some could only be obtained as prizes for completed quests. Pictures taken with the in-game camera could be hung on guest room walls, or put into a photo book for public view.

Players could also create games in their rooms (as long as the games followed VMK guidelines of appropriateness), and award some of their own items to players. Among the most popular of these were "Cute or Boot", best described as a beauty pageant/fashion contest, "Falling Chairs", a game where the owner of the room dropped chairs while other players raced to them, and "Don't Hit the Floor!" in which a maximum of six contestants stood on boxes. Two variations of "Cute or Boot" were "Dress Like Me!", a game where players tried to dress like the game's owner, and "Wear that hat!", where players wore the same hat as the owner. Another popular game was "Design a Room!", where the owner filled rooms with items that could be moved, and the object was for players to design the best room. A less popular one was "Survivor", where the owner asked a question and the first person to answer it correctly wins a point.

Guest room owners had the ability to remove ("boot") a player from their room if the player was causing problems. Players that were "booted" had to wait set period of time before returning to the room.

If a character was in their own room, then they could be found by the Guest Rooms "search" button (which searched on the names of room owners as well as the names of rooms). Other than this, there was no way within the game to find out whether a particular other character not on a player's friends list was online or where they were located.

In the New Orleans Square land, there was an exclusive room based on the VIP Exclusive Disney Club, located in the real New Orleans Square, Club 33. This room was used for staff events and open to some guests who had won the best guest room award.

Each week, VMK staff awarded a Best Guest Room Award, Best Game Room Award, and a Best Quest Award pin to the owners of guest rooms chosen to be superlative in originality and creativity. Winners of Best Guest Room not only got the Best Guest Room Award, but they also were allowed to "rent" Club 33 for a party, which a VMK host helped the winner organize. Several players earned the Best Guest Room, Best Game Room, or Best Quest award more than once; the VMK staff awarded the VIP pin to these outstanding players.

A player could set their guest rooms so that only people on their friends list could enter. On January 8, 2007, "tickets" were added; a room owner was then able to sell (for 10 credits) or trade tickets to allow entry to their rooms. The tickets appeared as single-use pins.

In March 2007, VMK Staff began "Room Makeovers", where VMK staff would go into randomly selected guest rooms, or guest rooms submitted by online players, and give the room a makeover if it was in need of one. Before and after pictures of the players' room were then posted each week on the VMK Newsletter.

During the month of April, VMK staff awarded a 'Best Pirate Room' award because April was 'Pirate Month'. Prizes included a "Seagull Nest Hat", a "Crow Barstool" and the seat that went with it, and a "Flaming Ransacked Window".

Some rooms were available in the Virtual Magic Kingdom from the shop button, others were available from quests, and some had limited availability built-in. Players were encouraged to get guest rooms when quests came out, because that could be the only time they would ever be available. For example, the Tron Guest Room was from a quest that was available only for a time, so players who did not finish the quest by a certain date, never received the Tron Guest Room. There were also codes for certain guest rooms.

In June 2007, "pay-to-play" guest/game rooms were disallowed because it was considered scamming, though games like "Pirates of the Caribbean" were still allowed to ask for the minimum 21 credits.

In January 2008, three new guest rooms were added to Main Street: Main Street Magic Shop in Central Plaza, Main Street Magic Shop Checkers (a new game at the Magic Shop), and the Penny Arcade on Main Street.

== Mini-games ==
The following minigames were available to play throughout the lands in the Virtual Magic Kingdom:

- Magic Checkers: Revealed to the VMK public in January 2008, this game was essentially checkers and was playable by two players at a time per room. Like most other games in VMK, Magic Checkers offered a reward of credits and items. The amount of credits awarded by this game increased depending on the amounts won. The players were able to buy single use Magic Pins for this game to get an advantage over the other players.
- Pirates of the Caribbean: Two to eight players, on two teams, either played a game of "Ship Battle" where one team must sink the other, or a game of "Capture the Flag" where one team must bring the opposing team's flag to their base before the other team. Once the game was over, both teams were rewarded with credits for their efforts. After every three wins on one level, a player received a treasure chest magic key that would open a chest corresponding to the level on which the player won the key. The prizes the player was awarded were from a list of randomly chosen pirate-related prizes that corresponded to the level the key was awarded in.
- Castle Fireworks Remixed: Fireworks were launched into the sky and the player had to click on each one with the correct symbol to detonate it. Pins and credits were awarded based on a player's performance.
- Jungle Cruise Photo Safari: The player piloted a safari boat and took photos of animals while avoiding obstacles. After the first time playing the game, 20 credits are awarded per game, no matter what the player's score.
- Street Party Music Game/Monorail Music Game: A player could sequence music loops into a song for characters to dance to. Credits were awarded for editing songs and for playing them.
- The Haunted Mansion Game: The Purple team and the Green team, with up to four players each, competed to capture ghosts in the mansion.
- The VMK Trading Card Game: The basic version of the VMK Trading Card Game was released on August 17, 2007. In this version, the player began with a random deck of cards and played a computer opponent in a sort of Rock, Paper, Scissors game. Other versions, along with customizable decks and rewards for winning, were released later as time went on. The game was never fully released due to technical issues and the game closing.

There were also several places in Tomorrowland where credits could be earned. In Nautilus Grotto and Shipwreck Graveyard, a player could collect shells that randomly popped up under water and receive one credit for every pearl they found. This game required the Diving Suit magic pin, which could be obtained from an in-game quest. Another place to earn credits was the Autopia Space Race and the Mars race tracks. In this game, a player drove over trophies to collect them, while also driving over gas cans to keep from running out of gas. For every trophy collected, a player received one credit. This game required one of the four available Autopia car magic pins, which could be obtained from an in-game quest. It also required an Autopia Driver's License.

The following minigames were available to play in the Tomorrowland Arcade until waterpark overlay:

- Airlock Escape: A puzzle game with some similarity to ChuChu Rocket!; successful completion of all fifteen levels rewarded the player with Deep Sea Diving Boots, Deep Sea Diving Jacket, and Deep Sea Diving Trousers (Deep Sea Diving Helmet could be purchased in the Inner-Space store).
- Blast in Space: An action game similar to Asteroids; the player piloted a spaceship to shoot rocks, and then received awards for passing all sixteen levels.
- Hyperspace Mountain: An action game where the player collected six "modules" throughout nine sectors and received the awards.

== Events ==
Virtual Magic Kingdom occasionally held special events at which prizes were given out. Special events included:

- Parade and Scavenger Hunt (beta period): Players were told to gather on Main Street and "parade" along its length. Some parade "leaders" were awarded the Dancing Inferno Magic pin, later considered rare to other players. Then a few staff members "hid" themselves in some rooms in the game, and the first people to find each of them were awarded prizes.
- Room Decorating Event: Players were told to decorate their rooms to be judged for prizes. For a Celebration theme, players commemorated Disneyland's 50th anniversary. For a Space theme, players offered an interpretation of what "space" meant to them. Prizes were also given for answering trivia questions.
- Dreams Month (September 2007): Hosts would be randomly walking around the park including guest rooms and handing out prizes. Some of these prizes included the Dreams room, which looks like Sleeping Beauty's castle, dream ears, dream pin, dream furniture, and many other items. Hosts would randomly walk around and players waiting in one room all day had difficulty finding them, therefore, players were encouraged to play VMK as they would normally to possibly win a prize.
- Haunted Maze Event (October 2005): An easy maze, a medium maze, and a difficult maze were available for players to find their way through. Successfully completing the maze would award a prize. However, the event was plagued by server problems, resulting in queues of half an hour or more to get into the mazes, and some players were not able to enter the mazes at all or were bumped offline in the middle of them.
- Gift-Giving Event (December 2005): A player could spend 500 credits to purchase a mystery gift which was given (in the game) to someone of their choosing on December 24. The gift turned out to be a green holiday wreath.
- Yeti Quest (February 2006): Players could visit designated rooms to find photos; by stringing together the first letter of each pictured item, a player could spell the location where the Yeti was hiding, and submit the location for prizes. The answer was "Injun Joe's Cave", and everyone who sent in a correct answer won a snow carpet.
- Ride-A-Thons: VMK staff occasionally hosted "Ride-A-Thons", in which they prepared rides for players to enjoy. When a player reached the end of a ride, he was given a ride piece with which to create their own ride. Several rides usually ran at the same time to handle capacity. The more a player rode, the more of a single prize a player would receive, depending on the event.
- Make-A-Room: VMK staff occasionally hosted "Make A Ride Rooms", which allowed players to go into a certain teleporter and design a room. The player with the best design got a prize, and soon many other players started the same game. A blue flag would be placed in the room once the ride was judged.
- Gingerbread Room Competition (December 2007): Players constructed a room using furniture items released during the month of December. The rooms were judged and the winners were given prizes that included a new shirt and hat that are different on boys than on girls.
- Captain Blackheart's Treasure Hunt Quest (March 29 - April 1, 2008): The biggest VMK quest ever. The quest consisted of 75 different tasks, and required the player to navigate VMK, answer Disney Pirates of the Caribbean-related questions, and play games. The prize awarded was 75,000 credits and some items that were not immediately obtainable. There was also a smaller version of the quest, called Captain Blackheart's Mini Treasure Hunt Quest. The smaller quest awarded 1000 credits. Captain Blackheart, as he is called, also hosted a small quest, but still quite large with the prize of 56,000 credits and many valuable items.

== Quests ==
=== In-game ===
In-game quests involved a series of tasks for a player, such as finding a specific room or an item in the room, changing one's outfit, saying a specific word, or winning a certain number of points in a minigame. There were two types of in-game quests: 'Q Button' quests, which players could start from anywhere in the game by pressing a button marked 'Q' on the game's taskbar; and kiosk quests, which were linked to a 'quest kiosk' item owned by a particular player or staff member. Successful completion of a quest usually awarded a prize. Each character could only complete each quest once. The Quests were timed and whoever completed the quest fastest would win a prize.

=== In-park ===
For the first two years of the game, there was an in-park quest program which permitted players to earn special in-game prizes at Disneyland and Walt Disney World resorts. These quests were mostly eliminated in mid-2007, with the exception of an activity sheet and quest which was handed out to guests waiting in line at the Finding Nemo Submarine Voyage attraction at Disneyland until around January 2008.

=== Hidden Mickeys ===
There were fifty Hidden Mickeys in the game, appearing as mouse-eared logos embossed onto scenery in rooms. Hunting for Hidden Mickeys could be a difficult task, as they were faint and rather difficult to see, and it could take time to earn enough credits to buy film to photograph the hidden Mickeys in-game. Almost every room had at least one, and some contained two.

Credits and pins were awarded after finding certain numbers of Hidden Mickeys (a Bronze Mickey pin for finding ten, a Silver Mortimer pin for finding thirty, and a Gold Oswald pin and 500 credits for finding all fifty). Completing this hunt originally awarded a printable PDF coupon with a code for the Gold Design set of items, which could be obtained by redeeming the coupon at Disneyland or the Magic Kingdom.

The locations of the Hidden Mickeys were changed on December 12, 2005. The new hunt was called "Hidden Mickey Quest Part II", and the new prize pins had "Part II" appended to their names.

== Character profiles ==
A new player began by registering an account at the VMK website. The player then set up a character (an avatar) and selected the character's gender and appearance (shirt, shoes, pants, hair, hat, face, and colors for skin and hair). The player chose a name for the avatar, but until the VMK staff approved the name they requested, their name was "Guest" followed by the number of player that they are (e.g. Guest7402548). If the name was not approved, the VMK staff would let the player create another name. The player also selected a "guest room", their own themed area which could be decorated with furniture, posters, a boat canal, train tracks, game items, or other material. One room was provided for free, and additional rooms could be purchased later with in-game credits. The player could enter a few lines of text, known as a "signature", which were displayed in the character's publicly visible profile. The character was then given a few tradeable items (mostly T-shirts), and was placed in the game.

A player could also choose from a list of randomly selected "adjective-adjective-noun" names presented to them; if they chose one of these names, it did not need undergo staff approval.

== Items ==
There were many in-game items which were buyable. Other could be won or gained from the parks. These items included furniture, clothing, and pins. Most were tradeable, some were not.

=== Badges ===
Badges were icons that appeared at the top of a player's information window and were visible to other players. Badges could not be traded:

- Born In Park: given to a character created at Disneyland or the Magic Kingdom. This was a green badge with a cutout silhouette of the Disneyland castle (this was also the symbol of VMK).
- VIP: given via a prize card's code; the card was given after completing the in-park quests to become eligible for the special park tour. This badge was sometimes received by winning a mini-game or Host event. Note that this is different from the VIP pin, which was given the second time a player won a Best Guest Room or Best Game Room award. The badge was purple with white VIP lettering in the middle.
- Here from Day 1: given to a character created during the "beta" stage (prior to June 27, 2005). This was a gold badge with a prominent "1" displayed in the middle.
- VMK Staff: paid employees who helped safeguard players and/or hosted VMK games and events. This badge was the quintessential smiling Mickey Mouse face as seen at the start of the old cartoons.
- Testers: VMK staff that tested out items, and were seen around with their name as "QA_". Testers also held the VMK Staff badge.
- Community Leader: volunteers who helped with the game; their names began with "CL_" (discontinued on October 24, 2007). This badge was a blue badge with Mickey's sorcerer hat. After it was discontinued, former community leaders did not have the badge or the CL_ at the beginning of their title.

=== Pins ===
A character could "wear" up to fifteen pins so that other players could see them in their profile. Some pins could be purchased from shops in the game; others could only be obtained by completing in-park or in-game quests, by winning host games, or from a Non-Playable Character (NPC) such as Esmeralda.

Usually a new pin was released on weekends of a certain month in the Emporium for a limited time. These pins usually cost 500 credits and were often a part of a set. For example, during October 2006 a set of Halloween themed pins came out, and a new pin was released every weekend. However, by Monday the pin was no longer available, making it high in value. The next weekend however, a new pin in the set was released and it started all over again.

"Magic pins" could also be worn. When activated (from the magic wand icon at the bottom of the screen, or by typing the pin's magic word), they displayed a visual effect, such as the character driving a car or turning into a snowman. Each effect had a duration of only a few seconds and had to be allowed to "recharge" for a minute or so before another use. If a player had two or more of the same kind of magic pin, they could be combined for a longer effect and shorter delay between uses. There were also single-use magic pins which disappeared after being used once (or after a specific "expiration date"). Some magic pins were very expensive and only available for a short period of time; for example, the "Turn Into Bat Magic Pin" (only available in October) was priced at 10,000 credits.

Some pins were not tradeable and could only be obtained through quests or host events. These pins included all single-use magic pins and all Tomorrowland quest pins. Any award pin, such as the best guest room award or the VIP pin, was also not tradeable. A player could check if a pin was tradeable by clicking the pin on a player's profile, which not only revealed whether a certain pin is available for trade or not, but also revealed who owned the pin and what effects (if any) the pin might have.

=== Clothing ===
When a player joined the kingdom, they received a pack of clothing along with a room and some furniture. Players that signed up at a Disney park sometimes received extra rewards.

Occasionally, the VMK shops sold special clothing items (or entire costumes). Some of these were seasonal, and some could only be purchased during a specific weekend. These items were usually expensive; due to this and their limited availability, they soon became valuable items in trading.

Some clothing items were only available to one gender. For example, boys could not have princess outfits (excluding the Princess Minnie hat), and girls could not have the Wildcats outfit.

Full costumes included spacesuits, princess outfits,(came in blue, yellow, pink) Haunted Mansion dress clothes, an Expedition Everest hiking outfit, baseball uniforms, and football uniforms.

Costume items included Mickey ears, and a variety of caps including baseball caps and a Sorcerer Mickey hat and more.

== Credits ==
A player could earn credits, purchase them in one of Disney's Parks (the game's currency) also by visiting the Disney Characters or by playing minigames.

Another popular way to amass credits was called "Nedding". It consisted of playing the Shrunken Ned's Jungle Cruise game but trying to end the game as quickly as possible by crashing repeatedly and running out of fuel. Each time the game was played it awards 20 credits, so the credits that could be gotten from this game were limited only by the length of time someone wanted to put into it.

Accounts used specifically for getting credits and items, known in other games as multis, were called "mules" (sometimes called "clones"). Since the game let a player create new accounts freely, players created mules (named after the beast of burden) to enter multi-use codes and collect credits by visiting Disney Characters. Players could buy items with a mule's credits, and then trade these items from the mules to their main characters. Players who used mules were said to be "muling", and in the game mules were called "done keys" (donkeys) due to the limited vocabulary.

Purchased items could be "sold back" for 20% of their purchase price, but some items were not able to be sold. For example, a quest kiosk could not be sold back or traded.

== Trading ==
Players could trade various items. Each player could put a maximum of fifteen items into a trade.

Clothing items that were only available for boys or girls could not be traded to the other gender. For example, a girl could not trade her princess outfit to a boy.

Some players tried to take advantage of the trading window to scam other players, but most of the trading window scams were short-circuited by game developers adding confirmation notices. VMK stated that if a person agreed to all of these notices, any issues a player might have with the trade were due to their own negligence.

A player could report a scammer with the "Report" button in the game, or by using the "Contact Us" link on the web site.

== Safety ==
The game's rules were posted on the VMK web site as "VMK Values", which were intended to help the game stay "a safe, non-threatening environment" for the many players between the ages of eight and fourteen. The rules prohibited sexual or racist language, harassment, divulging personal information, and attempts to hack the system. Violations could result in a permanent ban, which prevented users from using VMK from the ISP the violation occurred on. Despite this, attempted violations were quite common, and people attempted to get around the edited speech by formulating single words out of multiple words (e.g.: saying "I'm Tree Ears Hold").

Every player had a report button on their profile. If one player thought of something that another player did as against the VMK values, that player could report them. The report was immediately sent to the VMK staff for review, and any necessary actions were taken against that player's account. Players could also send "emergency" messages to staff without clicking the report button on another player. The main reason for this was if something was wrong with the game (e.g.: "I logged in the morning, and all my credits were gone"). Action would be taken against a player's account for sending false or unnecessary reports. These were usually made in an attempt to bring a VMK staff member to their room, or in an effort for revenge.

Disney prohibited sharing personal information in the game (and its limited dictionary also added a technical obstacle to this). Disney's stated intent was to protect the safety and privacy of its members, but this also prevented members from having a legitimate way of reaching each other outside the game. Members of some Disney internet discussion forums got around this by indicating in their in-game signature a discussion board through which they could be reached.

== In popular culture ==
VMK has been a frequently used device in The Kingdom Keepers series, written by Ridley Pearson. It serves as a rendezvous point for the main characters, as well as a communication device as the kids venture through the Disney parks. After VMK closed down in real life, Pearson incorporated the closing into the books.

=== Fan recreations ===
Virtual Family Kingdom was launched shortly prior to VMK's shutdown in 2008 by Narasopa Media. Originally developed as a virtual world for use in online business, the project expanded into an original educational virtual world for children and families based heavily off of the VMK experience. Although this connection was never stated outright, the game's early website expressed support for the "SaveVMK" fan movement.

VMKRevisited, the earliest fan revival of VMK, allowed users to access empty instances of the game's areas and access certain gameplay features without the use of an online avatar. The experience is currently lost due to the discontinuation of Adobe Flash.

MyVMK, an unofficial fan recreation of the original game, was launched in 2013 featuring monthly content updates. In addition to the inclusion of several additional Disney franchises, MyVMK has expanded the game's map with areas based on EPCOT, Disney's Animal Kingdom, and Disney California Adventure. On September 27, 2020, theme park documentary series Defunctland partnered with the game to debut a virtual recreation of the former Tomorrowland rock band Halyx, which had received a resurgence in popularity following Defunctland's crowd-funded documentary Live from the Space Stage.

VMK Legacy, a fan recreation adhering to the original's usage of limited operational hours, was launched in 2019 as NETCOT Center. Several pieces of external media, including VMK's collection of Flash games, have been preserved through this project.
