= Patriotic Nigras =

Group of Internet trolls

- Formation: 2005–2011
- Type: Multiple-use name/avatar; Virtual community; Voluntary association
- Purpose: Internet activism; Internet vigilantism; Trolling
- Region served: Global
- Members: Decentralized affinity group
- Website: www.patrioticnigras.org

The Patriotic Nigras (also known by the initialism PN) were a group of griefers in the online world of Second Life.

While the PN were known mainly for the disruption of Second Life and its users, they had also established themselves on the video sharing website YouTube, where they have posted videos of their activities including server raids. Their method of attack ranges from trolling a group or individual to the manipulation of the in-game scripting engine, where they perform such activities as showering their targets with boxes covered in Internet memes and shock images. These boxes then produce storms of graphical particles that block the victim's vision. They have also created avatars similar to those of the residents being harassed and destroyed them in gruesome ways to simulate a virtual death. The Patriotic Nigras have also caused the crashing of several Second Life regions (or "simulators") by using self-replicating objects that overload the processing power of the computer running them.

Properly characterizing the Patriotic Nigras has proven difficult for critics and researchers who have observed their activities from within their raids and from afar. The group has been described as a nonpolitical online terrorist group whose central motivation is described by the term "lulz". Others have identified quasi-political motivations such as the effort to hinder the entry of corporations into Second Life, and yet others have identified their activities as nihilistic or even agonistic online branches of the political avant-garde. The United States Department of Defense's Personnel Security Research Center has also described them as a prime example of online criminal gang culture including spillover effects into real life gang activity. The group has been linked to Internet group Anonymous as both a sub-group and an early progenitor iteration. They have been described as /b/tards (a group affiliated with 4chan), members of Something Awful, and as an offspring of the W-Hats griefer group (itself an offshoot of Something Awful). The PN make casual use of racist, sexist, and homophobic terminology which some researchers dismiss as a joke and which others have identified as "problematic" and "troubling".

Whatever the true character and affiliations of the group, it has provoked commentary by critics and Internet culture writers since its formation in 2005, and it has been listed as one of the central figures in the griefer culture of Second Life. Membership in the group has ranged from 35 members in 2007 up to a rough 200 at their peak in mid-2011.

== History ==
=== Habbo Hotel ===
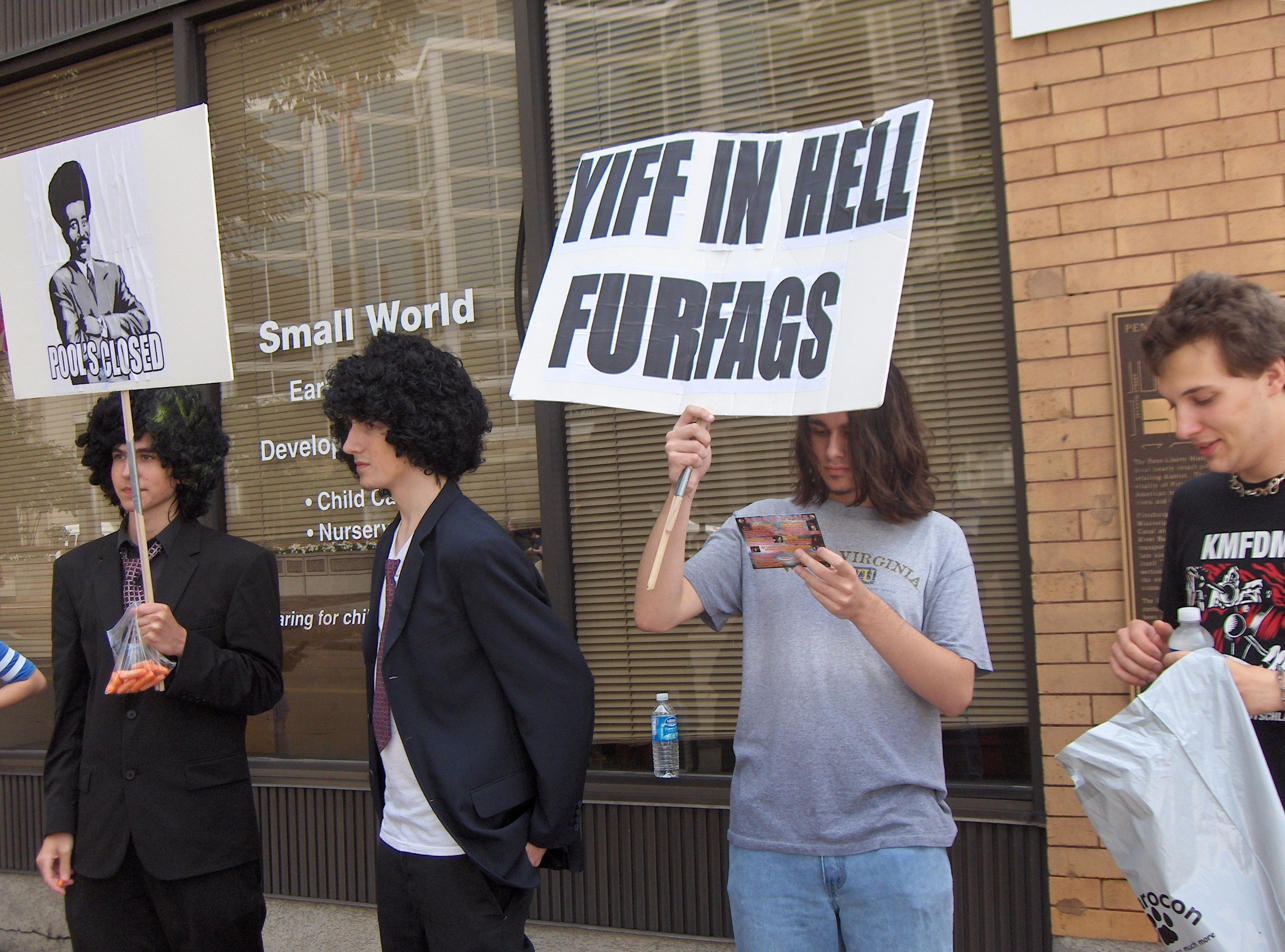
Anti-furry protesters at Anthrocon 2007 wear afro wigs and suits, and carry a sign saying "Pool's Closed" in reference to Patriotic Nigras raids on Habbo Hotel.

The origin of the Patriotic Nigras has been traced by cyber-rights researcher Peter Ludlow to the /b/ imageboard on 4chan where board members decided in late 2005 to "raid" Habbo Hotel, a popular avatar-based social networking game. The raid took the form of numerous black men presenting avatars with outsize afros and Armani suits blocking access to the virtual pool and telling other users that "the pool is closed because of AIDS". From this raid, according to Ludlow, emerged the Patriotic Nigras and their Internet meme slogan "Pool's Closed".

The success of the first raid led the Patriotic Nigras to perform raids on the Habbo Hotel during subsequent years. The 2006 anniversary raid was organized at the /i/ imageboard of the website 7chan. The format of these raids was always the same with the use of avatars that look like black men with afros, and with the group sometimes attempting to offend users by forming images with the avatars such as swastikas.

=== Second Life ===
The Second Life phase of the group's activities began in early 2006 when an anonymous user known as "Mudkips Acronym" reposted on 4chan a question originally posed at eBaum's World regarding whether or not Second Life "was raidable". There were 143 Patriotic Nigras members as of September 2007, of which around 35–60 were active. The response to "Mudkips Acronym"'s challenge was rapid and the group soon established itself as a fixture on Second Life. As of 2008, the Patriotic Nigras were said to operate hundreds, if not thousands, of Second Life accounts.

By mid-2006, a number of Second Life users had had enough of the PN's antics and a Second Life member named "Kalel Venkman" formed a counter-griefer vigilante group named the Justice League Unlimited. With avatars donning the skins of superheroes like Superman and Wonder Woman, the Justice League Unlimited established monitors in many areas of Second Life and zealously reported any untoward behavior to the Linden Lab administrators. The zeal with which they executed their duties, however, proved to be problematic and they were soon banned from areas such as FurNation for excessive vigilantism. According to cyber-rights researcher, Peter Ludlow, the Justice League Unlimited's anti-PN efforts also became problematic as the close association between 4chan users and Patriotic Nigras led to the unwarranted harassment of many users who were 4channers only and not members of the PN.

In February 2007, the group gained media coverage after an attack on the Second Life headquarters of politician John Edwards in which the Patriotic Nigras attacked with their avatars bearing "Bush 08" buttons and defaced Edwards's structure with feces, Marxist/Leninist posters, and obscenity. They also received coverage for an earlier attack on a room where Second Life user Anshe Chung was being interviewed about her claims to have made the "virtual property" equivalent of over one million dollars off the game. The room was invaded by flying penises. This incident was also attributed to the "Room 101" group.

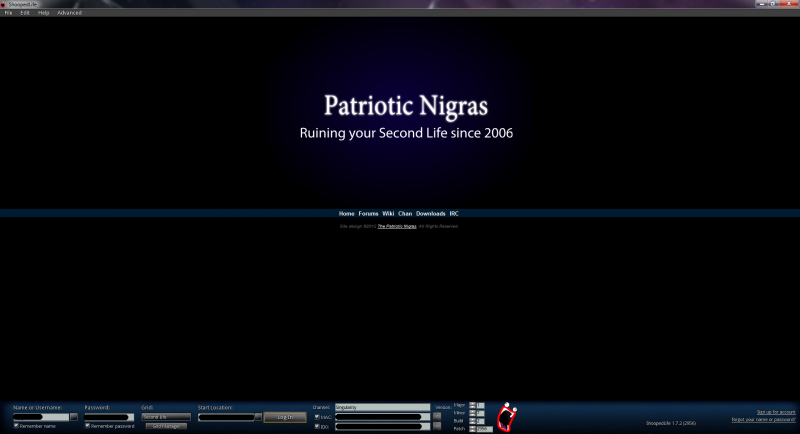
Titlescreen of the ShoopedLife client

The Patriotic Nigras were at first tolerated by the producers of Second Life, Linden Lab, but after the John Edwards attack they began to crack down and now take efforts to find and ban griefers on sight. To fight back, the Patriotic Nigras found ways to bypass the bans Linden Lab typically employs. New Media critics have described the Patriotic Nigras' antagonistic relationship with Linden Lab as arising in reaction to the company's player-monitoring policies (described as part of a broadly Foucaultian institutionalized control apparatus). To further their aims on Second Life, the PN developed a modified Second Life client called ShoopedLife that allowed them to bypass many of the hardware-banning methods typically used by Linden Lab to prevent persistent griefers from accessing Second Life. Reacting against this, the Justice League Unlimited formed close associations with Linden Lab administrators, going so far as to monitor when administrators were available for contact so that griefing could be rapidly halted.

As Patriotic Nigras countermeasures intensified the situation, Justice League Unlimited suspicions concerning Patriotic Nigras connections to 4chan deepened and Second Life players received bans for nothing more than their association with 4chan. This finally culminated in the closing of Woodbury University's virtual campus, and led thereafter to an escalation of factional maneuvers between the Woodbury group and the Justice League Unlimited who characterized all opponents as PN sympathizers. In a series of multi-directional infiltrations, personal information including the real life names of "Kalel Venkman", several Woodbury group members, writers for The Alphaville Herald, and Patriotic Nigras leader "Mudkips Acronym" was published online. In August 2007, "Mudkips Acronym" resigned in fear that this information would be used to compromise his security, and by mid-2008, the Justice League Unlimited had been disbanded following embarrassing revelations of the nature of their relationship with Linden Lab and their efforts to "dox" Second Lifers suspected of connections to the PNs through the collection of extensive dossier-style information.

Following the exit of "Mudkips Acronym", members of the Patriotic Nigras held an election to determine the new leader, which was won by a user known online as "^ban^". According to a griefing publication, "^ban^" resigned after ten months and handed control of the group over to a user known by the screen name "FrizzleFry101". In July 2008, the PN client, ShoopedLife was further modified to utilize the Lua code base to automate specific functions of the regular client. In December 2008, the main developer for ShoopedLife, "N3X15", left the Patriotic Nigras, effectively ending development of the client.
