= Atte Toikka =

Finnish rapper (1997–2019)

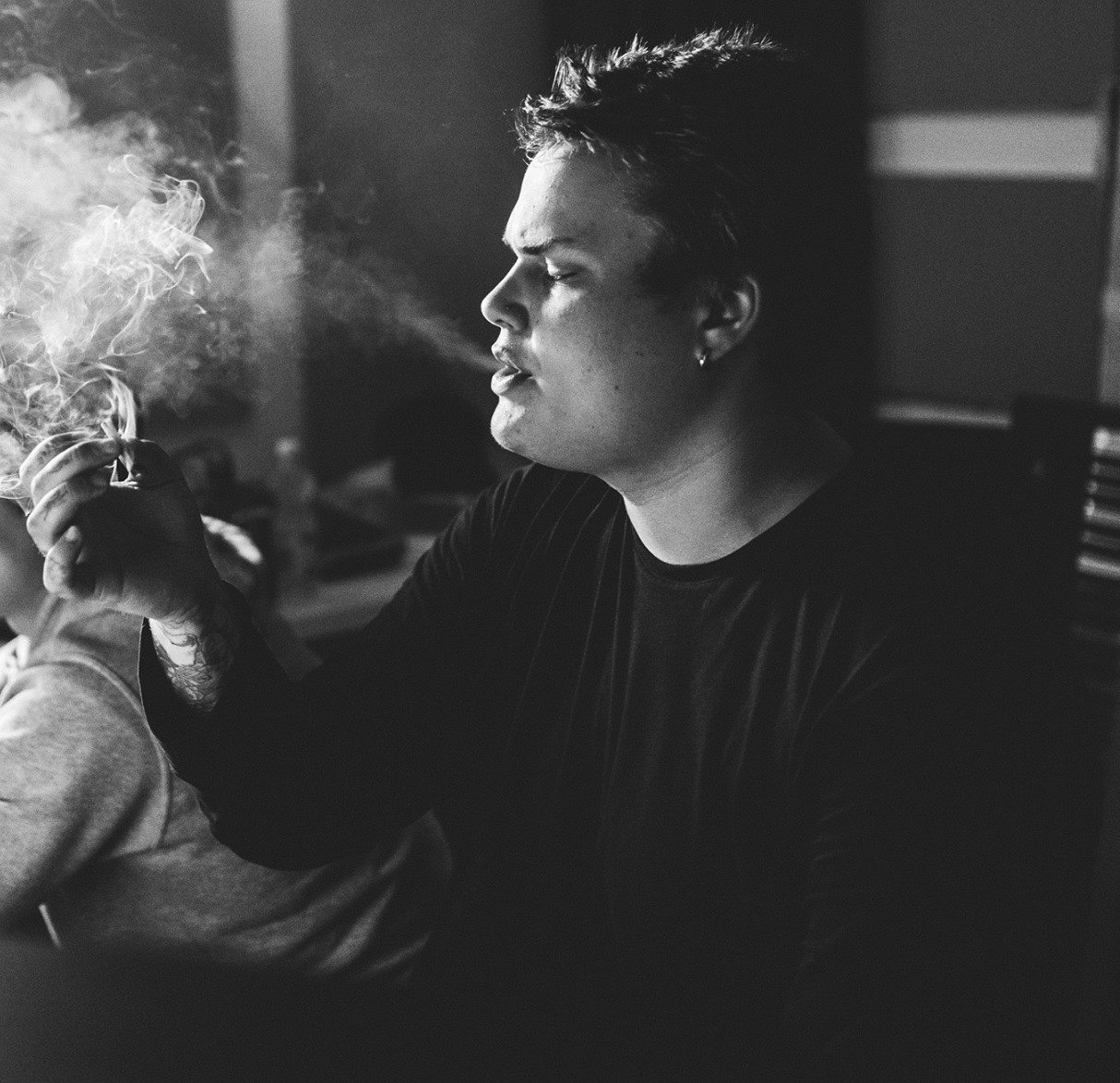
- Toikka at a studio

Background information
- Also known as: MKDMSK; Maski; MV$K
- Born: 15 May 1997; Forssa, Finland
- Died: 21 January 2019 (aged 21) Helsinki, Finland
- Genres: Hardcore hip-hop; horrorcore
- Occupations: Rapper; singer

Atte Toikka (15 May 1997 – 21 January 2019) was a Finnish rapper. He used artist names such as MKDMSK, Maski and MV$K.

== Biography ==
Born in Forssa, Toikka performed in many rap bands such as Musta-Lista and Laulavat Kulkurit. In his last years he worked as a singer, and on 4 January 2019 he published a music video called "Edelleen edellä". The so-called "Jonne" memes about Toikka started when he and his friends published photographs of him at the IRC-Galleria website. These photographs were later combined with quotes called "Jonne" memes.

Toikka, who lived almost his entire life in Malminkartano in Helsinki, died suddenly in his sleep of an enlarged heart on the couch of his childhood friend Taisto Palm (artist name Taisto Tapulist) in Helsinki on 21 January 2019.

Toikka's second studio album MKDMSK was published posthumously in November 2019. The album was finished by the producer-musician-manager Mikko "Pyhimys" Kuoppala.

== Lyrics and style ==
Toikka's lyrics have been described as dark, desperate and sometimes even suicidal. His songs touched on the subjects of depression, problems in his home neighbourhood of Malminkartano, narcotics and death.

== Discography ==
=== Solo career ===
==== Studio albums ====
Name	Publication	Ratings		Sales
Name	Publication	Album list	Physical album list	Sales
Ota kiinni	Published: 4 April 2017	–	–	–
MKDMSK	Published: 8 November 2019	1	2	platinum

==== Singles ====
Name	Year	Ratings	Sales	Album
Name	Year	Single list	Sales	Album
"Pelaajii"	2016	–	–	Ota kiinni
"Sushizone" (featuring Pajafella, Kube)	2016	–	–	Ota kiinni
"Freddie Krueger"	2016	–	–	Ota kiinni
"Tanssin paholaisen kanssa"	2018	–	platinum	MKDMSK
"Edelleen edellä"	2019	12	platinum	MKDMSK
"Surullinen klovni" (featuring Pyhimys)	2019	2	triple platinum	MKDMSK
"Salut"	2020	13	gold	(only published as a single)

==== Other ratings ====
Name	Year	Ratings	Sales	Album
Name	Year	Singles list	Sales	Album
"Avasin mun silmät"	2019	5	platinum	MKDMSK

=== Bands ===
==== Musta-Lista ====
===== Studio albums =====
- Jööbelinkalikat (2015)
- Tiet on pimeitä (2017)
