= Habbo =

Finnish online community

- Developer: Sampo Karjalainen; Aapo Kyrölä; Sulake
- Type: Virtual world, Massively-multiplayer world-building game
- Launched: 2000 (Finland); other sites launched later (see full list)
- Status: Active
- Website: See list of websites

Habbo (formerly called Habbo Hotel) is a virtual world and massively multiplayer online role-playing game (MMORPG). It is owned and operated by Sulake. Founded in 2000, Habbo has expanded to nine online communities (or "hotels"), with users from more than 150 countries. As of October 2020, 316 million avatars have been registered in the game.

The website is divided into three clients, Habbo, Habbo X, and Habbo Hotel: Origins. The Habbo client is aimed at teenagers and young adults, while Habbo X and Habbo Hotel: Origins cater for adult players.

Users on the game can create a virtual avatar (called a "Habbo"), converse and interact with other users, play games, build and design virtual rooms, take care of virtual pets, and complete quests.

== History ==
A screenshot of the Mobiles Disco game

Habbo stemmed from a 1999 hobby project by creative designer Sampo Karjalainen and technologist Aapo Kyrölä entitled Mobiles Disco, for a Finnish band. It was a virtual chat room running on Kyrölä's Fuse technology. After having been contracted to design a virtual game and chat called Lumisota (Snow Wars) for a Finnish internet service provider, they were contracted for another project. They developed Hotelli Kultakala (Hotel Goldfish) with a small team of developers. It launched in August 2000 on the ISP's web portal.

Kyrölä, Karjalainen and Dee Edwards, an entrepreneur from the UK, wanted to create an international business based on the virtual hotel concept, drafting a plan in autumn 2000, and raised finance. By the end of January 2001, Habbo Hotel had been launched in beta mode. The new hotel exited beta a few weeks afterwards, aimed at the teenage market, with marketing and payment partners in place, run from a HQ in London. It featured a new credits system with community and safety features. The next community ("hotel") was launched in Switzerland a few months later, in four languages. It has since been expanded to over 31 countries in five continents, with Hotelli Kultakala being rebranded as a local Habbo hotel, and has been invested in by venture capitalists.

In May 2006, the service its domain names were changed from www.habbohotel.com (.co.uk, .com.au, etc.) to www.habbo.com (.co.uk, .com.au, etc.).

In August 2007, Habbo's Chinese hotel closed down temporarily. The challenging Chinese market and high operational costs led to the decision of closing the service. Customers in China were redirected to other Habbo communities. In December 2008, the Russian hotel announced it was closing in February 2009 as a result of low numbers. Those on the site with "furni" (virtual furniture that can be used to furnish rooms in the hotel, bought with the use of Habbo credits that can be purchased with real money) received credit codes for use on the U.S. hotel.

In January 2010, it was announced that the U.S. and Canadian hotels would undergo a merger, to be finalized in April 2010. However, in April 2010, it was announced that all English-speaking hotels would be merged into one. On 5 May, the merger for Habbo U.S .and Habbo Canada was complete. On 2 June the Australian hotel merge was completed. The Singaporean hotel was officially merged on 4 June. On 10 June, the final hotel, Habbo UK, was merged and that completed the set, making Habbo.com the international, English-speaking game. Accounts were migrated to the final English-speaking hotel with varying degrees of automation until March 2011 – after that date any accounts not migrated from the initial Habbo Canada, Singapore, UK and Australia hotels were deleted.

On 12 June 2012, concerns about the game were raised by Channel 4 News. A two-month investigation found users posting pornographic and violent messages – despite the fact that Habbo is intended for children and young adults. A reporter posing as an 11-year-old girl claimed that explicit sex chats were common within minutes of logging on to the game, which she described as "very sexual, perverse, violent, pornographic." As a result of the allegations, Sulake immediately suspended all chat on the game. Speaking in a blog post, chief executive of Sulake, Paul LaFontaine, said that the firm "was reviewing the long-term plans for the Habbo community". The chat services were reinstated in June 2012. Two leading investors, Balderton Capital and 3i, withdrew their funding from Sulake, and some UK retailers stopped selling Habbo gift cards.

In August 2012, Sulake announced a new hotel, Habbo Turkey, fully localised for Turkish-speakers. The then CEO of Sulake, Paul LaFontaine commented, "We're thrilled to announce we have launched in Turkey. This is a very important market for us and we expect Habbo Hotel to be a big success there, with many teenagers joining to converse with friends, meet people with similar interests and enjoy access to the global Habbo Hotel network. Our launch in Turkey is the next big step on our global roadmap."

In May 2014, Sulake released a Habbo application for the iPad in the App Store worldwide.

In December 2020, Sulake released their new beta-version of Habbo. The game has moved to the Unity platform, since Adobe Flash marks its end in 2020. In February 2021, Sulake released the Adobe AIR client alongside the Unity client, with the plan to continue work on the Unity client and improve the user experience. In the official statement from the product owner, he acknowledged that the Unity client was lacking key features and did not reflect the needs of the community. The AIR client is a temporary solution to many of the concerns the community had initially about the Unity client and will eventually be retired when the new client is at an acceptable level and contains key features that the Habbo community rely on.

In 2021, Azerion reached an agreement with fellow Sulake shareholder Elisa Oyj to acquire the company fully. Azerion had a majority stake in Sulake until it secured a deal with Elisa for the remaining 49 per cent of shares. Azerion, which is a pan-European firm specialising in gaming and adtech, first purchased a controlling stake of 51% in Sulake back in 2018. It has since been helping to grow revenues, which have risen 46% between January 2019 and December 2020. Habbo joined a block within Azerion’s gaming content business which consists of products including Woozworld and Governor of Poker.

In April 2021, Habbo brought back the mini game SnowStorm.

In September 2021, an NFT collection was introduced. The collection consists of Habbo avatars that can also be used in the community. In addition, a new NFT Habbo Hotel server named "Habbo X" entered Alpha access in December 2022. This new Hotel only allows access to those who own NFTs from certain collections.

In December 2022, Sulake released Habbo X. Currently in an alpha test phase, Habbo X is a game that focuses on community building, interoperability, and play-and-earn mechanics.

In June 2024, Sulake released Habbo Hotel: Origins, which is a version of the 2005 Habbo client software with a more community-led approach. It is targeted at adults only.

In August 2025, Habbo celebrated its 25th anniversary. According to Product Director Mika Timonen, the platform had grown to over 300 million total registered users with hundreds of thousands of monthly active users from more than 150 countries. By this time, the game had evolved into three distinct client experiences: the main Habbo client, Habbo Collectibles focused on rewards collection, and Habbo Hotel: Origins.

== Gameplay ==
Habbo's main feature is the "hotel", and consists of a client made using the Unity platform. The hotel can be accessed by logged-in users via the Habbo Homepage. When a user accesses the Hotel they are brought to a screen colloquially known as Hotel View/Landing View. From this screen, members can navigate to virtual rooms via the Navigator and browse the rooms of the hotel, look for items to buy in the catalogue, private message friends on their friends list or enter their preset Home room.

=== Public rooms & games ===
Public Rooms are rooms which are available to all members. They often depict scenes such as restaurants, cinemas, and dance clubs. Most Public Rooms contain automated bots (non-player characters) that shout pre-recorded messages and tips, and can give avatars drinks and food items. Public Rooms are designed by Sulake and are not customizable by users. Rooms in the Habbo Hotel: Origins client contain games such as Wobble Squabble, Lido Diving, Battle Ball and the Cunning Fox Gamehall with games such as Noughts and Crosses, Battleships, Chess and Poker.

In June 2011, most Public Rooms were removed from the Habbo client. Games such as Battle Ball, and Snow Storm were replaced with Freeze and Battle Banzai due to coding issues when they upgraded from Shockwave to Flash.

A screenshot of a guest room in Habbo

In June 2024, in the Habbo Hotel: Origins client, users can access classic games with the purchase of in game tickets such as Wobble Squabble, Lido Diving and Battle Ball. Players also have access to free games in the Cunning Fox Gamehall with games such as Noughts and Crosses, Battleships, Chess and Poker.

=== Guest rooms ===
Guest Rooms are special rooms which users can customize with furniture, wallpaper, and floor patterns; these can be purchased with credits. Users can choose from pre-made room blueprints or create their own with builders club. Guest rooms can be created by any member and can be locked to allow access only to specific users or password holder. Many users create their own games in their guest rooms, which give furniture or coins as a prize. These rooms are categorized on the navigator in many categories such as "Trading", "Parties", and "Role Playing". Virtual pets and bots can be bought and kept in Guest rooms. Users can interact with the pets and program bots, which will obey certain commands the player throws at them.

=== User created games ===
Users can create and host their own games in Habbo by buying and using furniture from the shop. Games such as Falling Furni, Cozzie Change, The Fridge Game, Mazes or by "buying game bundles" in the shop such as Battle Banzai, Freeze, Football and Ice Tag. Users can check out the hotel's Navigator and select the Games & Mazes category under the Rooms tab to play in other people's user-created rooms hosting games.

=== Role-play elements ===
Habbo users often create guest rooms which emulate real world businesses, police departments and other establishments. As the game's platform facilitates the creation of groups some users choose to design their groups based on a role-playing theme and go on to participate in activities which promote their groups to other users in the game.

== Currency ==
There are three main types of currency on Habbo. Credits (or coins) are used to buy furniture in the catalogue, and Duckets (free currency earned by completing achievements such as logging in a number of days in a row) enable users to buy effects and 'Rentable furni' (furniture to decorate rooms for a period of time, before it is then removed). Diamonds are used to buy rewards such as exclusive furniture items or Habbo Club and are gained by buying credits (one diamond for each credit bought). As well as that, seasonally themed currencies (e.g. "Snowflakes" for Christmas) are given out to players by staff for completing certain quests which can then be used to buy seasonal Furni for a short time.

In addition to these three, NFT credits (and credit furni) have been added shortly after the release of the NFT avatar collection.

=== Credits ===
Credits (also called "coins" in some hotels) are an in-game virtual currency that can be purchased using a variety of different services, such as credit card, a telephone service, a prepaid card and via SMS. They can also be redeemed into Exchange, which displays the Credits as an item of virtual furniture; the furniture can then be traded among users, and redeemed back into Credits. Users can join Habbo Club (HC), which is a premium subscription purchased using Credits. Features of Habbo Club membership include a badge, new clothes and outfits for a player's avatar, more friends on their friends list, the ability to create groups, and a free piece of furni exclusive to club members every month.

==== Duckets ====
Duckets (a play on the word ducats) are part of a complementary currency introduced in February 2013. Users earn Duckets by completing certain achievements and quests.

The Duckets currency can be used to purchase effects, room promotions, furniture and even as far as pets.

==== Diamonds ====
Diamonds are another currency on Habbo. It was introduced in early July 2014. Diamonds are received through purchases of Credits with real money. Diamonds are used to buy Habbo Club, buy rare furniture items or they can be redeemed for credits in furniture form.

=== NFT credits ===
At the start of 2022 a currency was added which is generated daily for NFT avatar holders (depending on the count and type of avatars held).

This currency can be used to buy exclusive furniture and clothes in a dedicated shop on the Habbo NFT website. Credits can also be exchanged for Credit Furni (NFT bank note items) which, together with the other NFT items, may be traded on Immutable X Marketplace for several common Cryptocurrencies.

Furthermore, owning a NFT avatar grants Habbo Club and Builders Club access (which both normally cost a monthly fee).

== Moderation ==
Habbo's parent company Sulake has automated online moderation, and only house Community Coordinators are available for all hotels. Habbo stated in 2011 that the in-game moderators were tasked with tracking some 70 million lines of conversation worldwide every day, and blocking inappropriate users and filtering links to black-listed sites.

Sulake also worked with child safety organizations and local police forces to stop inappropriate behavior. Habbo's moderation and safety systems were recognized as making the service as one of the safest social networks in a 2011 European Commission report. In 2011, Habbo was also awarded the commendation of 'Safer by Design' from the Child Exploitation and Online Protection Centre (CEOP). Sulake encouraged users to take responsibility for reporting any abuses or any bad behaviour on the site, providing education and rapid-response support to users who may experience uncomfortable conversations or questions.

As well as working within the Habbo online community, Sulake actively contributed to campaigns like Insafe and Safer Internet Day to be used on relevant user safety issues and collaborates in more than 30 charitable partnerships around the world to educate teens about a load of topics including safe internet use, trolling, the dangers of drugs, bullying etc. Partners include NSPCC (ChildLine), UNICEF, the Red Cross, the National Safety Hospital, Frank, Child Right, Power Child as well as many other market specific organisations.

Users in Habbo can report users breaking the Habbo Way (which are sets of rules on Habbo that everyone must obey) by clicking on the offending avatar, scrolling through their information and clicking report then trying to highlight the offending pieces of chat. Users can also ignore their user by clicking on them and pressing ignore, and this will block every action and chat line that comes from that user into their view.

Automatic moderation exists in Habbo's language filter, the "Bobba Filter", which replaces offensive text with the simple word "bobba". Replacement applies to anything from mild to highly offensive words, groups of 6 or more numbers, suggestive phrases, and websites.

From August 2000 to 31 December 2005, Habbo existed as a program for experienced members of each Habbo community to become a 'Hobba'. Hobbas were non-paid, volunteer moderators with limited powers that acted as Hotel Guides. On 31 December 2005, Sulake suspended the Hobba program completely due to major security issues and the rapidly growing Habbo community. It was decided that it needed a stronger, more professional moderation team, that would be followed by employees of Sulake. The following requests for the program to be revived, in June 2012, it was announced that modernized Hobbas, called Guardians, would be introduced into Habbo. These users will be limited and will be closely monitored to ensure safety is not compromised or advanced.

In June 2012, there was a two-month investigation by Channel 4 News that uncovered lapses in Habbo's online moderation, such as cyber sex, sexual frequences and sexual predation on minors, which subsequently led to withdrawals from two of the company's biggest investors. In response to the news, the company globally muted all chat and text, and launched "The Great Unmute", which allowed users to express their views on the company's future, their experiences with Habbo, and their thoughts on the Channel Four News report. Following this, launching The Great Go-Live, Habbo lifted the chat restrictions for Finnish users to allow testing on a new safety system. Chat restrictions were lifted for users in Brazil and Spain, followed by France, Italy, United Kingdom, Germany and the Netherlands. A Parental Advisory Summit was also launched, to allow parents and users the chance to answer how Habbo can deliver a safer experience, have a safe environment and influence what content children view on other social media platforms. Restrictions on chat were lifted in Norway, Denmark and Sweden, and finally in the English hotel on 6 July 2012.

== Habbo raids ==
Habbo has been a frequent target for organized raids by Anonymous. In 2006, a meme began circulating on 4chan boards regarding racist conduct by Habbo moderators and arbitrary banning of players with darker-skinned avatars. As a result, users signed up to the Habbo site dressed in avatars of a black man wearing a grey suit and an Afro hairstyle (usually known as the nigra; see Patriotic Nigras) and blocked entry to the pool, declaring that it was "closed due to AIDS", flooding the site with internet sayings, and forming swastika-like formations. When the raiders were banned, they complained of racism.

In January 2021, the live-streamer Quackity and his viewers raided the game with the hashtag "#NOTMYHABBO", protesting the recent restrictions on item trading.

== Sponsorship ==
As a website geared towards teenagers, Habbo has attracted sponsorship from outside entities and organizations. This sponsorship includes visits by musicians (such as Gorillaz, Skye Sweetnam, Jamelia, and Akon) as well as various corporations. In 2014, Habbo associated itself with the company DitchTheLabel which hosts various anti-bullying sessions on Habbo.

== Reception ==
In November 2001, The Daily Telegraph listed Habbo as a top-10 chat and instant messaging site, describing it as "great-looking" and "proving popular with teenagers." In 2005 and 2006, Habbo Australia received the NetGuide Online Web Award for "Best kids'/youth website". In September 2006, Sulake won Deloitte's Fast 50 competition.

Common Sense Media, a non-profit association advocating for children and families, and studying the effects that media and technology have on young users, reports that "[f]oul talk and sexy chat rooms dominate [this] virtual world", giving it one star out of five and not recommending it for kids of any age.

In 2009, Habbo won the Most Innovative Launch Campaign 2009 in The Media Guardian Innovation Awards.

== Websites ==
There are currently 10 websites in operation, with as many as 12 up until 29 April 2015. This date saw the closure of the Danish, Norwegian and Swedish language hotels, having been in operation from December 2004, June 2004 and December 2003 respectively.

=== Open ===
Language	URL	Opening date	Notes
Finnish	habbo.fi	August 2000	
Spanish	habbo.es	September 2003	Originally Spain, currently it also includes all Spanish-speaking countries
Italian	habbo.it	November 2003	
Dutch	habbo.nl	February 2004	
German	habbo.de	March 2004	
English	habbo.com	September 2004	Originally US, but is now merged with all English-language hotels
French	habbo.fr	24 November 2004	
Portuguese	habbo.com.br	February 2006	
Turkish	habbo.com.tr	August 2012	

=== Closed ===
Country	URL	Opening date	Closing date	Notes
United Kingdom	habbo.co.uk	4 January 2001	10 June 2010	Merged with Habbo.com
Switzerland	habbo.ch	August 2001	4 October 2010	Merged with Habbo.de
Japan	habbo.jp	February 2003	16 April 2009	
Sweden	habbo.se	December 2003	29 April 2015	Closed due to low numbers
Canada	habbo.ca	June 2004	5 May 2010	Merged with Habbo.com, now redirects to Habbo.com or Habbo.fr (Note: Habbo Canada was only available in the English language. Guests who previously had a Habbo.ca account were able to transfer it to the Habbo.com website. Following the shutdown of Habbo Canada, French Canadians are invited to visit the Habbo.fr hotel.)
Norway	habbo.no	June 2004	29 April 2015	Closed due to low numbers
Portugal	habbo.pt	March 2006	4 June 2010	Merged with Habbo.com.br
Australia	habbo.com.au	November 2004	2 June 2010	Merged with Habbo.com
Singapore	habbo.com.sg	December 2004	4 June 2010	Merged with Habbo.com
Denmark	habbo.dk	December 2004	29 April 2015	Closed due to low numbers
China	habbo.cn	July 2006	24 August 2007	
Russia	habbo.ru	September 2007	6 February 2009	
