= WOOZ =

WOOZ may refer to:

- WOOZ-FM, a radio station (99.9 FM) licensed to Harrisburg, Illinois, United States
- WOOZ, a virtual currency used in Woozworld, a social universe designed for kids aged 8 to 14.
