= The Voice Hiphop & RnB Norway =

Former Norwegian radio station

The Voice was a Norwegian radio station with a rhythmic CHR format.

It was owned by Bauer Media AS. The Voice broadcast in Oslo and Bergen. The station's target audience was the 15-24 age group.

The Voice brand in Norway was also used for The Voice TV channel. Sweden, Finland, Bulgaria and Denmark have their versions of the network: The Voice (radio station).

The Voice (Norway) was shut down in 2015.
