= 2013 Finnish League Cup =

2013 Liigacup
Tournament details
- Country: Finland
- Teams: 12

Final positions
- Champions: FC Lahti
- Runners-up: JJK

Tournament statistics
- Matches played: 43
- Goals scored: 132 (3.07 per match)

The 2013 Finnish League Cup will be the 17th season of the Finnish League Cup, Finland's second-most prestigious cup football tournament. TPS are the defending champions, having won their first league cup last year.

The cup consists of two stages. First there will be a group stage that involves the 12 Veikkausliiga teams divided into three groups. The top two teams and two best 3rd placed teams from each group will enter the one-legged elimination rounds – quarter-finals, semi-finals and the final.

== Group stage ==
Every team will play every other team of its group twice, both home and away. The group stage matches will be played from 15 January to 6 March 2012.

=== Group 1 ===
Pos	Team	Pld	W	D	L	GF	GA	GD	Pts	TPS	LAH	JJK	INT
1	Turun Palloseura (A)	6	4	2	0	9	2	+7	14		0–0	1–0	5–1
2	FC Lahti (A)	6	2	3	1	4	3	+1	9	0–1		0–0	2–1
3	Jyväskylän Jalkapalloklubi (A)	6	2	2	2	7	5	+2	8	0–1	1–1		3–0
4	FC Inter	6	0	1	5	5	15	−10	1	1–1	0–1	2–3	

Updated to match(es) played on 6 March 2013. Source: veikkausliiga.com
Rules for classification: 1) points 2) head-to-head points 3) head-to-head goal difference 4) head-to-head number of goals scored 5) goal difference 6) number of goals scored
(A) Advance to a further round

=== Group 2 ===
Pos	Team	Pld	W	D	L	GF	GA	GD	Pts	HJK	MYP	HON	MAR
1	Helsingin Jalkapalloklubi (A)	6	5	0	1	17	1	+16	15		2–0	4–0	6–0
2	MYPA (A)	6	4	1	1	9	5	+4	13	1–0		4–1	1–0
3	FC Honka	6	2	1	3	10	16	−6	7	0–1	2–2		4–3
4	IFK Mariehamn	6	0	0	6	5	19	−14	0	0–4	0–1	2–3	

Updated to match(es) played on 6 March 2013. Source: veikkausliiga.com
Rules for classification: 1) points 2) head-to-head points 3) head-to-head goal difference 4) head-to-head number of goals scored 5) goal difference 6) number of goals scored
(A) Advance to a further round

=== Group 3 ===
Pos	Team	Pld	W	D	L	GF	GA	GD	Pts	RPS	KPS	JAR	VPS
1	RoPS (A)	6	3	1	2	8	6	+2	10 (Note: KPS 2–2 RPS; RPS 1–0 KPS)		1–0	0–1	1–2
2	KuPS (A)	6	3	1	2	14	6	+8	10	2–2		4–0	4–1
3	FF Jaro (A)	6	2	2	2	5	9	−4	8	1–3	1–0		1–1
4	Vaasan Palloseura	6	1	2	3	6	12	−6	5	0–1	1–4	1–1	

Updated to match(es) played on 6 March 2013. Source: veikkausliiga.com
Rules for classification: 1) points 2) head-to-head points 3) head-to-head goal difference 4) head-to-head number of goals scored 5) goal difference 6) number of goals scored
(A) Advance to a further round

=== Ranking of third-placed teams ===
Pos	Team	Pld	W	D	L	GF	GA	GD	Pts
1	JJK	6	2	2	2	7	5	+2	8
2	FF Jaro	6	2	2	2	5	9	−4	8
3	FC Honka	6	2	1	3	10	16	−6	7

Updated to match(es) played on 6 March 2013. Source: veikkausliiga.com
Rules for classification: 1) points 2) goal difference 3) number of goals scored

== Knockout stage ==
=== Quarter-finals ===
9 March 2013

MYPA	1–1	KuPS
Okafor 39'		Colley 36'
Penalties
	3–4

Referee: Mikko Leino

9 March 2013

HJK	0–0	JJK
Penalties
	5–6

Referee: Mikka Lähdesmäki

9 March 2013

TPS	1–1	FF Jaro
Lehtonen 48'		Skrabb 60'
Penalties
	4–3

Referee: Tero Nieminen

10 March 2013

RoPS	0–1	FC Lahti
		Kari 35' (pen.)

Referee: Vesa Hätilä

=== Semi-finals ===
15 March 2013

FC Lahti	3–0	KuPS
Kemppinen 22'; Hertsi 53'; Vini Dantas 61'

Referee: Jari Järvinen

13 March 2013

TPS	0–0	JJK
Penalties
	4–5

Referee: Dennis Antamo

=== Final ===
6 April 2013

FC Lahti	2–1	JJK
Länsitalo 78'; Joenmäki 90+2'		Ahola 17'

Referee: Mattias Gestranius
