= Harry E. Sloan =

American business executive (born 1950)

- Born: Harry Evans Sloan; March 8, 1950 (age 76); Torrance, California
- Education: UCLA, Loyola Law School
- Known for: Chairman of Metro-Goldwyn-Mayer and SBS Broadcasting; co-founding SPACs
- Spouse: Florence Low
- Children: 4

Harry Evans Sloan (born March 8, 1950) is an American business executive, a former chairman of Metro-Goldwyn-Mayer (MGM) and SBS Broadcasting, and a former entertainment lawyer. In partnership with fellow former motion picture company chairman Jeff Sagansky, Sloan has launched seven special-purpose acquisition companies (SPACs) since 2011, with an eighth filed for in June 2021. Sloan also was a director at ZeniMax Media until 2021. He was chairman and CEO of MGM from 2005 to 2009 and, prior, of SBS Broadcasting, of which he was founder.

== Early life and education ==
Sloan was born to a working class Jewish family in Torrance, California. His father worked in the parts department at Douglas Aircraft; his mother was a substitute teacher and helped found the first Jewish temple in the South Bay.

In 1973, Sloan earned a B.A. degree from UCLA and then, in 1976, a J.D. degree from Loyola Law School. While studying law at Loyola, he worked for the Screen Actors Guild, exposing Sloan to the entertainment industry.

== Career ==
From 1976 to 1983, he was an entertainment lawyer with Sloan, Kuppin and Ament, which he founded in Los Angeles. His clients included Ron Howard and Michael Landon.

Sloan entered the production side of the film industry in 1983 when he acquired New World Pictures from Roger Corman with his former law partner Lawrence Kuppin, which they renamed New World Entertainment Ltd., becoming producers, and co-chairs until 1989, and growing the B-movie studio into a mini-major. New World was sold to Ron Pearlman in 1993.

He was appointed by Ronald Reagan in 1987 to the President's Advisory Council on Trade and Policy Negotiations (ACTPN).

In 1989, Sloan founded SBS Broadcasting, which became the second-largest broadcaster in Europe, and was chairman and CEO from 1990 to 2001. Near the end of this term, he purchased a 9 per cent stake in ZeniMax Media, which SBS Broadcasting holds, having sat on ZeniMax's board since 1999. In 2005, Sloan sold his SBS interest of 11 per cent as part of the sale of the broadcaster to Permira and Kohlberg Kravis Roberts, in a deal valued at about US$2.26 billion.

Sloan was chairman and CEO of MGM from 2005 to 2009, before the company restructured via a pre-packaged bankruptcy, where he remained a consultant.

=== SPACs founded ===
In February 2011, Sloan partnered with former CBS Entertainment and Sony Pictures CEO Jeff Sagansky, forming Global Eagle Acquisition Corp., as a shell company, at a time when SPACs had gained a poor reputation, raising over $190 million for investments in in-flight entertainment. The pair launched a second SPAC, Silver Eagle Acquisition Corp., with Sloan as chairman, in 2013. Sloan and Sagansky formed their third SPAC in 2015, as Double Eagle Acquisition, with a $US500 million IPO, followed by fourth SPAC, in 2018, Platinum Eagle Acquisition Corp., which had an IPO of $US325 million.

In 2019, the pair launched their fifth SPAC, Diamond Eagle Acquisition Corp., with a US$400 million IPO. In September 2020, Bloomberg reported that Sloan and Sagansky had launched six SPACs, which had raised US$2.4 billion since 2011. The sixth SPAC, Flying Eagle Acquisition Corp., had had a $600 million IPO. In 2021, the partners formed a seventh SPAC, Soaring Eagle Acquisition Corp., with an IPO that raised $1.75 billion, reported by Variety as far exceeding comparable IPOs. In June 2021, the partners, noted as “serial SPACers”, filed with the SEC for an eighth SPAC, Spinning Eagle Acquisition, to raise up to $US2 billion.

== Political involvement ==
Sloan was a California state financial chair for the Mitt Romney's 2012 campaign for the US presidency. Sloan also is a trustee on the board of The McCain Institute. During the 2016 election cycle, Sloan initially supported Ohio Governor John Kasich until he dropped out; on August 9, 2016, Sloan announced his support for Democrat Hillary Clinton.

== Personal life ==
Sloan has two daughters from his first marriage. He is married to Florence (née Low) Sloan who is of Malaysian Chinese descent and immigrated to the U.S. They have two sons.

Sloan lives in Los Angeles, California. In 2000, he purchased the Bel Air home of Janet Jackson for $9.5 million.
