= Maria Bodøgaard =

Norwegian television presenter (born 1983)

Maria Bodøgaard (born 27 March 1983) is a Norwegian television presenter born in Bodø.

Bodøgaard is known as a presenter on The Voice TV Norway, but has also worked as the producer for several productions including 'I fyr og flamme' (2023), 'Broslo' (2021) and 'Hvem bor her?' (2020). She also directed 'Homsepatruljen', 'MGP' and season two of 'Trekant'.

In 2013 Bodøgaard starred in the comedic web series, 'Øyvind & Co', she played a parody of herself—a highly-connected celebrity director—with other real-life TV figures occasionally making guest appearances.
