= SBS Broadcasting Group =

Defunct broadcasting company

- Type: Private
- Founded: 1989; 37 years ago
- Defunct: 2007
- Fate: Acquired by ProSiebenSat.1 Media
- Successor: Discovery Communications Nordic; Play Media; Talpa TV
- Headquarters: Luxembourg
- Area served: Europe
- Key people: Harry Sloan
- Website: www.sbsbroadcasting.com (offline)

SBS Broadcasting Group (SBS), formerly Scandinavian Broadcasting Systems, was a European multinational media group, operating commercial television, premium pay channels, radio stations and related print businesses in Northern, Western and Central and Eastern Europe. It became the second-largest broadcaster in Europe.

== History ==
SBS was founded by Harry E. Sloan in 1989, who bought a stake in the Danish station Kanal 2 (a local station in Copenhagen, now Kanal 4) and Norwegian TVNorge. In 1991, Sloan bought the Swedish Nordic Channel, which was soon renamed Kanal 5 and became the third-largest commercial broadcaster in the country. The company was originally known as "TV1", but was renamed "Scandinavian Broadcasting Systems" in 1991. After expanding into Benelux and Eastern Europe, the name was changed again, this time to SBS. By July 1994, the time of the CC/ABC-Disney merger, Capital Cities/ABC owned 23% of SBS.

In March 2005, SBS acquired C More Entertainment, a Nordic pay tv provider operating under the Canal+ brand. In that year, SBS was bought by the equity firms Permira and Kohlberg Kravis Roberts (KKR). Telegraaf Media Groep of the Netherlands was also a shareholder in SBS, with a 20% equity interest. Permira and KKR also bought the German broadcaster ProSiebenSat.1 Media in early 2007, and on 27 June 2007 it was announced that ProSiebenSat.1 Media acquired the SBS Broadcasting group for 3.3 billion euros from the joint owners. ProSiebenSat.1 Media became the second-largest broadcaster of Europe with 48 TV stations.

Starting in 2011, ProSiebenSat.1 Media started to sell its non-German properties. The Dutch operations have been bought by Sanoma and Talpa Media Holding on 20 April 2011. In the end of 2011 ProSiebenSat.1 Group has sold its Bulgarian radio stations as well as the music channel the Voice TV to A.E. Best Success Services Bulgaria EOOD. The transaction was closed on 10 November 2011. On 14 December 2012, Discovery Communications bought the Nordic portion of SBS for $1.7 billion. The radio stations were later sold to Bauer Media Group. The Romanian TV and radio operations were bought by Romanian businessman Cristian Burci and Antenna Group in 2013.

== Former operations ==
This section lists former channels and publications until the company's acquisition in 2007.

=== Television ===
Belgium

- VT4 (later Play4, now Play)
- VIJFtv (later Play5, now Play Fictie)

Bulgaria

- The Voice (Bulgaria)

Denmark

- Kanal 2 (DA) (now TV 2)
- Kanal 4
- Kanal 5
- SBS NET (now 6'eren)
- The Voice TV Denmark (later 7'eren, now defunct)

Finland

- Kutonen
- TV5

Italy

- Retemia (defunct, joint ownership with Internova, Profit, and Videopiù, 1997–1999)

Hungary

- TV2
- TV3 (later FEM TV, now defunct)

Macedonia

- Sitel
- Sitel 2
- Sitel 3
- Kanal 5
- Kanal 5 plus

Netherlands

- SBS6
- Net5
- Veronica (later TV10, now defunct)
- SBS9
- Kijk.nl (web only)

Norway

- Norsk TV1 (now TV 2)
- TVNorge
- The Voice TV Norway (web only)
- FEM
- MAX
- VOX

Poland

- TVN (joint ownership with ITI Group, 2000–2003)

Portugal

- TVI (1996–1999)

Romania

- Prima TV (also broadcast by cable in Moldova)
- Kiss TV (known as TV K Lumea before November 2006, now owned by Antenna Group)

Sweden

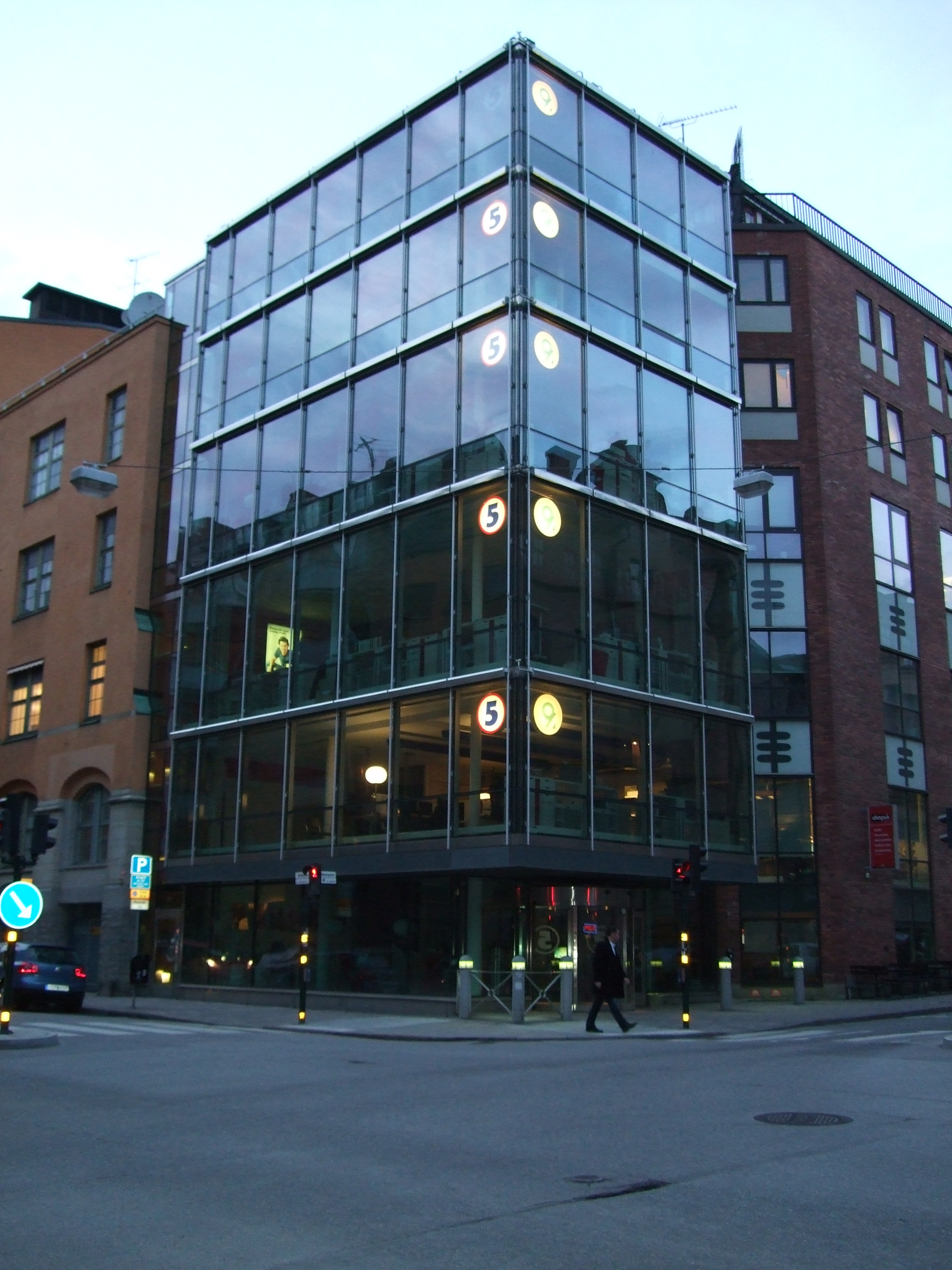
Swedish headquarters of Kanal 5 and Kanal 9

- Nordic Channel (now Kanal 5)
- Kanal 5
- Kanal 9
- Kanal 11
- The Voice TV Sweden (music, defunct)
- ONE Television (defunct)

Switzerland

- TV3 (defunct, joint ownership with Tamedia, 1999–2001)
- 3+

=== Radio stations ===
Denmark

- The Voice
- Radio 2
- POP FM
- NOVA FM

Greece

- Lampsi 92.3 FM (now owned by Attica Editions)

Norway

- Radio 1
- The Voice
- Radio Norge (previously known as Kanal 24)

Romania

- Kiss FM (previously known as Radio Contact, available in Moldova with local insertions)
- Magic FM
- One FM
- Rock FM

Sweden

- Mix Megapol
- Rockklassiker
- The Voice
- Radio 107.5
- Vinyl 107

=== Print ===
- Veronica (TV/Radio guide)
