= James A. Riedel =

American political science professor (1921–2006)

James A. Riedel (1921–2006) was a 20th-century American professor of political science at the State University of New York at Albany (SUNY Albany).

== Background ==
James A. Riedel was born on February 4, 1921, in Rocky Ford, Colorado. His parents were Ferdinand and Eva Riedel. Riedel received a bachelor's degree from the University of Denver, a master's degree from the Syracuse University, and doctorate from the University of Chicago.

== Career ==
During World War II, Riedel served in the United States Army Signal Corps.

Riedel was a professor of political science at SUNY Albany for 50 years.

Riedel also served as book review editor for the Journal of Northeastern Political Science Associations.

After retiring from teaching, Riedel was a director of research for the Defense Personnel Security Research Center (PERSEREC) of Monterey, California, a division of the United States Navy, for whom he oversaw research and publication of many reports.

== Personal life and death ==
Riedel married Betty-jo Riedel; they had four children.

James A. Riedel died age 85 on March 26, 2006, in Clifton Park, New York, at Ellis Hospital.

== Works ==
Books:

- Hoosiers Go to the Polls with Joseph L. Martin (1956)
- New perspectives in state and local politics (editor) (1971)
- Capitol goods: the New York State Legislature at work with Leight Stelzer (1956)

Articles:

- "Boss and Faction," Annals of the American Academy of Political Science and Social Science (1964)

Reports:

- Standardizing Procedures for Notifying Individuals of an Adverse Personnel Security Determination in the Department of Defense (1994)
- Appeal Board and Personal Appearance Procedures for Adverse Personnel Security Determinations in the Department of Defense (1995)
- Security Clearances and the Protection of National Security Information Laws and Procedures (2000)
- Public Opinion of Selected National Security Issues: 1994-2000 (2001)
- Cleared DoD Employees at Risk – Report 1: Policy Options for Removing Barriers to Seek Help (2002)
- Espionage Against the United States by American Citizens 1947-2001 (2002)
- Final Report on DSS Test of Phased Reinvestigation (2002)
- Improving Supervisor and Coworker Reporting of Information of Security Concern (2003)
- Preferences and Priorities for Professional Development in the Security Workforce: A Report of the Professional Development Survey (2004)
- Reciprocity: A Progress Report (2004)
- Implementation of a Two-Phase SSBI-PR at DSS: An Evaluation with Recommendations (2005)
- Reporting of Counterintelligence and Security Indicators by Supervisors and Coworkers (2005)
- Summary and Explanation of Changes to the Adjudicative Guidelines Approved by the President December 29, 2005 (2006)
