= TV5 (Finnish TV channel) =

Finnish television channel

- Country: Finland
- Broadcast area: 90,4 % of Finland
- Headquarters: Helsinki, Finland

Programming
- Picture format: 1080i HDTV

Ownership
- Owner: Warner Bros. Discovery EMEA (Skydance Corporation)
- Sister channels: Kutonen; Frii; TLC (Finland)

History
- Launched: 12 March 2004 (relaunched 10 September 2008)
- Former names: VIISI (March 2004 - November 2004); TV Viisi (September 2008 - August 2011)

Links
- Website: Official website

Availability

Terrestrial
- Digital terrestrial: Channel 7 (HD); Channel 27

TV5 (TV Five) is a Finnish television channel owned and operated by Warner Bros. Discovery EMEA. The channel launched in March 2004 but it was replaced by The Voice TV Finland in November 2004. It started operating again in September 2008 on the same channel as The Voice. It transmitted every day from 6 pm to 1 am. In the fall of 2010, TV5 started using the same logo, identity, graphics, and branding as Kanal 5, a channel in Sweden also owned by SBS Discovery. TV5 and The Voice became separate channels on April 1, 2011. After that TV5 became the fastest growing channel, by viewers, in Finland in 2011.

In line with a channel standardization plan by WBD's Nordic unit, as part of a rebrand in January 2024, the channel changed its color to red, which was selected for WBD's main channels in the region.

== Viewership numbers ==
TV5's current audience record is the final ice hockey match of the 2022 Beijing Winter Olympics between Finland and Russia, which was watched by an average of 1,239,000 viewers.

== Logo and identities ==
TV5's second logo from 2008-2010

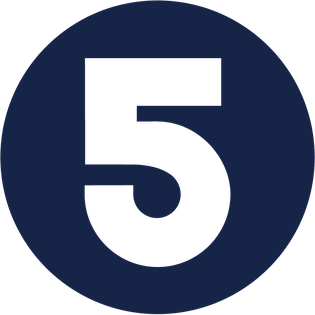
TV5's sixth logo from 2019-2024

== Programming ==
TV5 airs feature films, series and documentaries.

- 33 Square Meters
- 3rd Rock from the Sun
- Absolutely Fabulous
- America's Funniest Home Videos
- AndreGuedesCartoon
- Animatunes
- Autogol Cartoon
- Au Pays Des Tetes A Claques
- Beach Patrol
- Beauty and the Geek Australia
- Benidorm Bastards
- The Blacklist
- Blood
- Blood 2
- Brooklyn Nine-Nine
- Bučke
- Café de Wereld
- Calciatoons
- The Catherine Tate Show
- Dark Justice
- Dobrodošli v Jebovlju
- Economic War
- El Club De Los Famosos
- Et Dieu Créa Laflaque
- Farscape
- The Fast Show
- FBI
- Flashpoint
- The Friday Night Project
- Geordie Shore
- Grounded for Life
- Harry Enfield's Television Programme
- Headcases
- Home and Away
- Hyvät Herrat (reruns)
- Intervention
- Jebovlje
- Jon & Kate Plus 8
- Jersey Shore
- Jung Rhythm
- Looney Tunes Cartoons
- MacGyver
- Marcatoons 2D
- Marcatoons 3D
- Mundotoons
- Men Behaving Badly
- My Wife and Kids
- Mult Lichnosti
- NCIS
- Numbers
- Operation Repo
- Packed to the Rafters
- Parobrod Srbija
- Pranksterz: Off Your Boss
- Pranksterz: No Rest For The Wicked
- Private Chefs of Beverly Hills
- Rass Derb
- Relic Hunter
- Robot Chicken
- Rookie Blue
- Roseanne
- Sexcetera
- Street Wars Constructor Underworld
- Tetes A Claques
- That '70s Show
- The Fairytaler
- The Folks on the Hill
- Saloon Gier
- Zapovednik
- Академия собственных ошибок
- Без скидок
- Казкова Русь
- Красная Стрела
- Кремлёвский концерт
- Сватики
- Сказочная Русь
- Мульти Барбара
- Открытие России
- Отражения
- Почемучка
- Предсказание погоды
- Путешествуй с нами/Вперёд в прошлое
- Реальная политика с Глебом Павловским
- Тушите свет!
- Уроки хороших манер/Говорим без ошибок/Какое ИЗОбразие
- Чердачок «Фруттис»
- Чиииз
