= List of programs broadcast by VOX (Norwegian TV channel) =

List of programs broadcast by Vox

== 0–9 ==
| Original title | Country | Norwegian title | Genre |
|---|---|---|---|
| 60 Minute Makeover | UK | En, to, tre - oppussing! | Home makeover |
| 71 Degrees North | UK | 71 grader nord UK | Reality TV |

== A ==
| Original title | Country | Norwegian title | Genre |
|---|---|---|---|
| The Apprentice | USA | | Reality TV |

== B ==
| Original title | Country | Norwegian title | Genre |
|---|---|---|---|
| Benidorm | UK | | Comedy-drama |
| Build a New Life in the Country | UK | Et nytt liv på landet | Home makeover |

== C ==
| Original title | Country | Norwegian title | Genre |

== D ==
| Original title | Country | Norwegian title | Genre |
|---|---|---|---|
| The Daily Show: Global Edition | USA | Uka med Jon Stewart | Talk show |
| Dalziel and Pascoe | UK | Dalziel og Pascoe | Crime drama |
| Deadwood | USA | | Western |
| Doc Martin | UK | | Comedy drama |
| The Doctors | USA | | Health |

== E ==
| Original title | Country | Norwegian title | Genre |

== F ==
| Original title | Country | Norwegian title | Genre |

== G ==
| Original title | Country | Norwegian title | Genre |
|---|---|---|---|
| Grand Designs | UK | Drømmedesign | Home makeover |

== H ==
| Original title | Country | Norwegian title | Genre |
|---|---|---|---|
| Hell on Wheels | USA | | Western |
| The Hour | UK | | Drama |

== I ==
| Original title | Country | Norwegian title | Genre |
|---|---|---|---|
| Inspector Morse | UK | Inspektør Morse | Crime drama |

== J ==
| Original title | Country | Norwegian title | Genre |

== K ==
| Original title | Country | Norwegian title | Genre |

== L ==
| Original title | Country | Norwegian title | Genre |
|---|---|---|---|
| Late Show with David Letterman | USA | Letterman | Talk show |

== M ==
| Original title | Country | Norwegian title | Genre |
|---|---|---|---|
| Man Stroke Woman | UK | | Sketch show |
| McLeod's Daughters | AUS | McLeods døtre | Drama |
| Midsomer Murders | UK | Mord og mysterier | Crime drama |
| Murdoch Mysteries | CAN | Murdoch-mysteriene | Crime drama |

== N ==
| Original title | Country | Norwegian title | Genre |
|---|---|---|---|
| NYPD Blue | USA | | Crime drama |

== O ==
| Original title | Country | Norwegian title | Genre |
|---|---|---|---|
| The Office | UK | | Comedy |

== P ==
| Original title | Country | Norwegian title | Genre |

== Q ==
| Original title | Country | Norwegian title | Genre |

== R ==
| Original title | Country | Norwegian title | Genre |

== S ==
| Original title | Country | Norwegian title | Genre |
|---|---|---|---|
| Spin City | USA | | Sitcom |
| Stingers | AUS | Politiagentene | Crime drama |

== T ==
| Original title | Country | Norwegian title | Genre |

== U ==
| Original title | Country | Norwegian title | Genre |

== V ==
| Original title | Country | Norwegian title | Genre |

== W ==
| Original title | Country | Norwegian title | Genre |
|---|---|---|---|
| Without a Trace | USA | Sporløst forsvunnet | Crime drama |

== X ==
| Original title | Country | Norwegian title | Genre |

== Y ==
| Original title | Country | Norwegian title | Genre |

== z ==
| Original title | Country | Norwegian title | Genre |
