= VOX (Norwegian TV channel) =

Norwegian television channel

- Broadcast area: Norway

Programming
- Picture format: 576i (16:9 SDTV); 1080i (HDTV)

Ownership
- Owner: Warner Bros. Discovery EMEA (Skydance Corporation)
- Sister channels: TVNorge; FEM; REX; Discovery Channel Norge; Eurosport Norge; TLC Norway

History
- Launched: 23 January 2012; 14 years ago
- Replaced: The Voice TV

Links
- Website: Official website

VOX is a Norwegian television channel owned by Warner Bros. Discovery EMEA, a division of Skydance Corporation.

The channel was launched in January 2012 and targets adults over 30.

== Logos ==
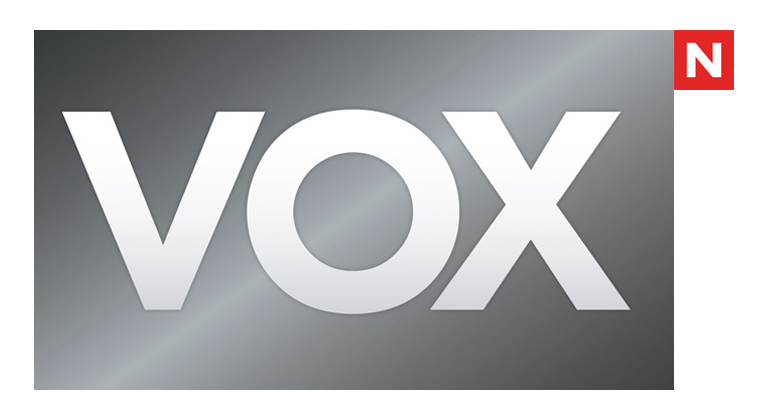
VOX first logo from 2012 to 2024

== Programs ==
- List of programs broadcast by VOX
