= Sampo Karjalainen =

Finnish computer scientist (born 1977)

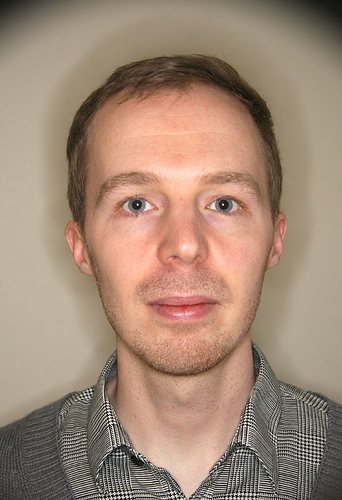
- Born: 2 May 1977 (age 49); Tampere, Finland
- Occupation: Video game designer

Sampo Karjalainen (born 2 May 1977) is one of the founders of Sulake and Habbo, an online social networking video game aimed at teenagers. Sampo has also been in other projects, including Bobba Bar for iPhone. Karjalainen is now the designer, chief executive officer, and co-founder of ProtoGeo Inc., the creators of the Moves fitness tracker app for iOS.

== Projects ==
- 1994: To the Point
- 1998: Satama Interactive
- 2000: Ego Taivas media lab
- 2000: Sulake
