= /b/ =

Imageboard or online forum on 4chan

- Website type: 4chan imageboard
- Available in: English
- Owner: Hiroyuki Nishimura
- Founder: Christopher Poole
- Commercial: Yes
- Launched: 2003; 22 years ago
- Current status: Online

/b/, also called random, is an anonymous imageboard on 4chan. Created in 2003 under the name "anime/random", it was one of the first boards established on 4chan. While /b/ permits discussion and posting of any sort of content, the community etiquette is to self-limit discussion on /b/ of those topics that are specialties or the focus of other boards on 4chan. /b/ is one of the most popular boards on 4chan, next to /pol/ (politically incorrect). Due to its popularity and notoriety, it overshadows the website with a bad reputation. The Washington Post described /b/ as "an unfathomable grab-bag of the random, the gross and the downright bizarre".

== Analysis ==
A 2011 Massachusetts Institute of Technology analysis examined two weeks of posts to /b/ in summer 2010. During this period, users made 5.5 million posts on /b/ across 480,000 threads. The median life of a discussion thread was four minutes; the longest in that period was six hours. The analysis found that the community mostly posts playful images and links. The same analysis found that at least 90% of the posts are anonymous, although posters do adopt and discard various claims of identity at will.

A 2013 article noted that 4chan is a top-ranking website by popularity, especially in the United States, but also globally. Within 4chan, /b/ was the most popular and active board as of 2013.

/b/ is one of a handful of key online spaces from which the hacktivist group Anonymous originated.

== Character ==
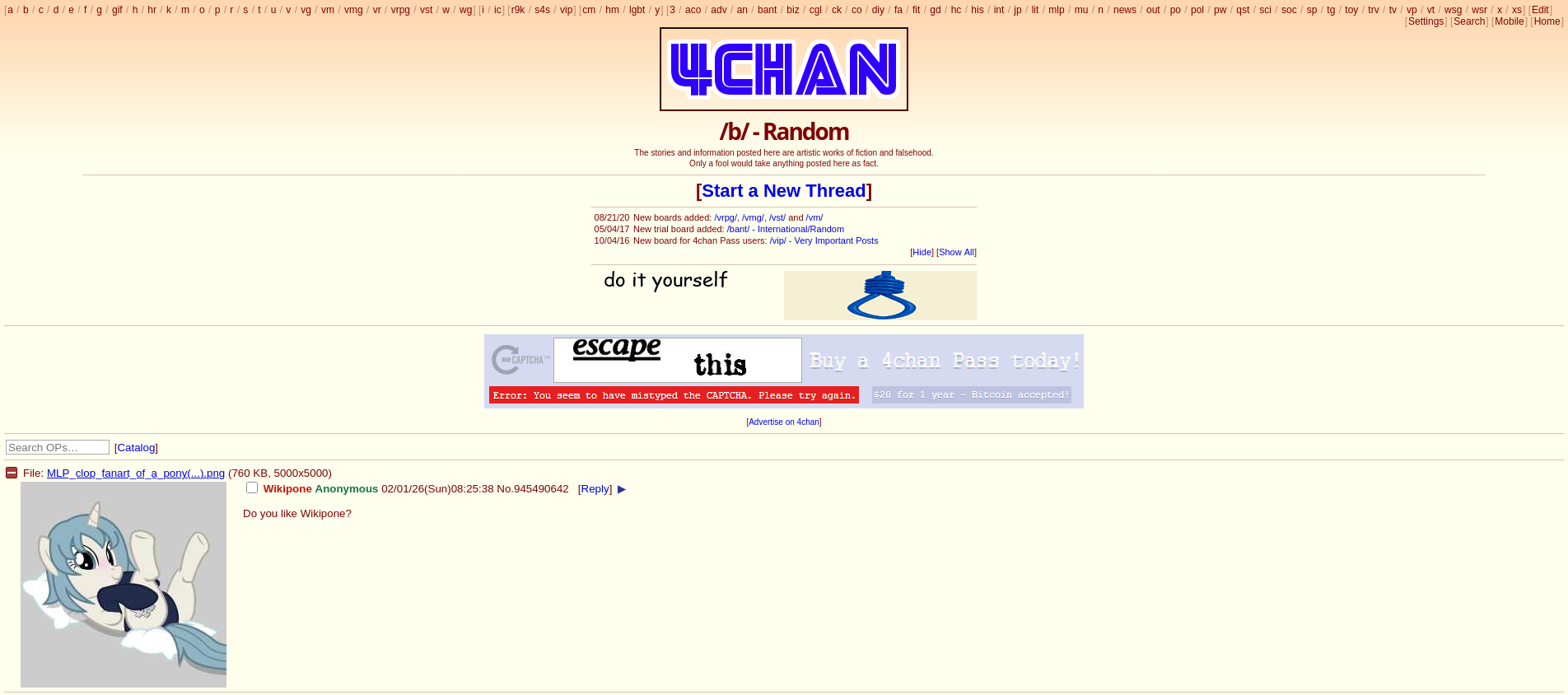
Index of 4chan's /b/ board on February 1, 2026, showing an example of clop depicting a ponified Wikipe-tan

/b/ and /pol/ are the most notorious boards on 4chan.

One of /b/'s defining features is its lack of posting rules. In general, anything that does not go against US law will not be removed. /b/ is consequently one of the few boards on 4chan where users can post grotesque and objectionable material such as gore and hate speech.

/b/ is among the boards on 4chan that have a not safe for work (NSFW) designation. Consequently, users may post NSFW content on /b/ when the 4chan moderators may restrict such postings on boards without that designation.

The community at /b/ sustains various customs. Users may promise to post photos of acts of self-degradation in an attempt to barter. A 2013 research paper reported that misogyny sustains the culture at /b/.

Users sometimes claim to have insider information on news events, ask for advice, often on romance and relationships, or post various images containing puzzles.

/b/'s history, the absence of any substantial regulation or enforcement of rules, and the users' anonymity have all been considered as essential characteristics that have contributed to a culture of ambiguity that serves to confound attempts to assess the verisimilitude of that which is posted to the board. One scholar summarized the unique challenges presented by the cultural context of /b/ by observing:

"It is impossible to truly discern posters' views due to their anonymity and the saturation of 4chan's discourse with self-referential irony and a refusal to accept anything at face-value."

=== Memes ===
On /b/, many memes are shared regularly among users.

== Events ==
In October 2006, a /b/ user was arrested for threatening to bomb multiple National Football League stadiums. He was sentenced to six months in prison and a further six months in house arrest.

In 2008, /b/ users spread a rumor that Apple's (at the time) CEO, Steve Jobs, had suffered a fatal heart attack; the rumor's impact on shareholder's confidence resulted in a drop in Apple's share price by approximately US$10 (equivalent to $15 in 2025).

Through a combination of repeat voting and manipulation of the site's servers, /b/ users successfully altered the outcome of Time magazine's 2009 "world's most influential people" poll so that 4chan's founder, Christopher Poole, was represented in the publication as the world's most influential person.

In January 2012, when the United States Department of Justice took down Megaupload, Anonymous retaliated by hacking various websites including that of the Department of Justice and the Federal Bureau of Investigation. During the attacks, /b/ hosted live narration of the event with early information about how to watch various websites go down.

4chan hosts various live discussion events related to crimes and persuading people to mistakenly and foolishly destroy their iPhones.

== Development ==
In 2009, /b/ accounted for 30% of traffic on 4chan, which had 44 image boards at the time.

In 2011, in response to community demand to expel "social posts" on /b/, Moot established /soc/, the social board of 4chan.

== See also ==
- Sarah Palin email hack – 2008 US presidential election incident
- 4chan – Anonymous imageboard website
- /pol/ – Political discussion board on 4chan
- /mu/ – Music discussion board on 4chan
- /mlp/ – My Little Pony: Friendship Is Magic discussion board on 4chan
- /v/ – Videogames discussion board on 4chan

== Bibliography ==
- "Complete History of 4chan". tanasinn.info. Archived from the original on March 5, 2017.
- Entraste (September 26, 2015). "4chan Chronicle/The Golden Age of /b/". en.wikibooks.org.
- Nissenbaum, Asaf; Shifman, Limor (October 9, 2015). "Internet memes as contested cultural capital: The case of 4chan's /b/ board". New Media & Society. 19 (4): 483–501. doi:10.1177/1461444815609313. ISSN 1461-4448. S2CID 27696765.
- Hagen, Sal (June 9, 2021). "An overview of 4chan/b/ archives: What is left of the Internet's cesspool?". Open Intelligence Lab.
