= Woozworld =

Virtual gaming community and social network service

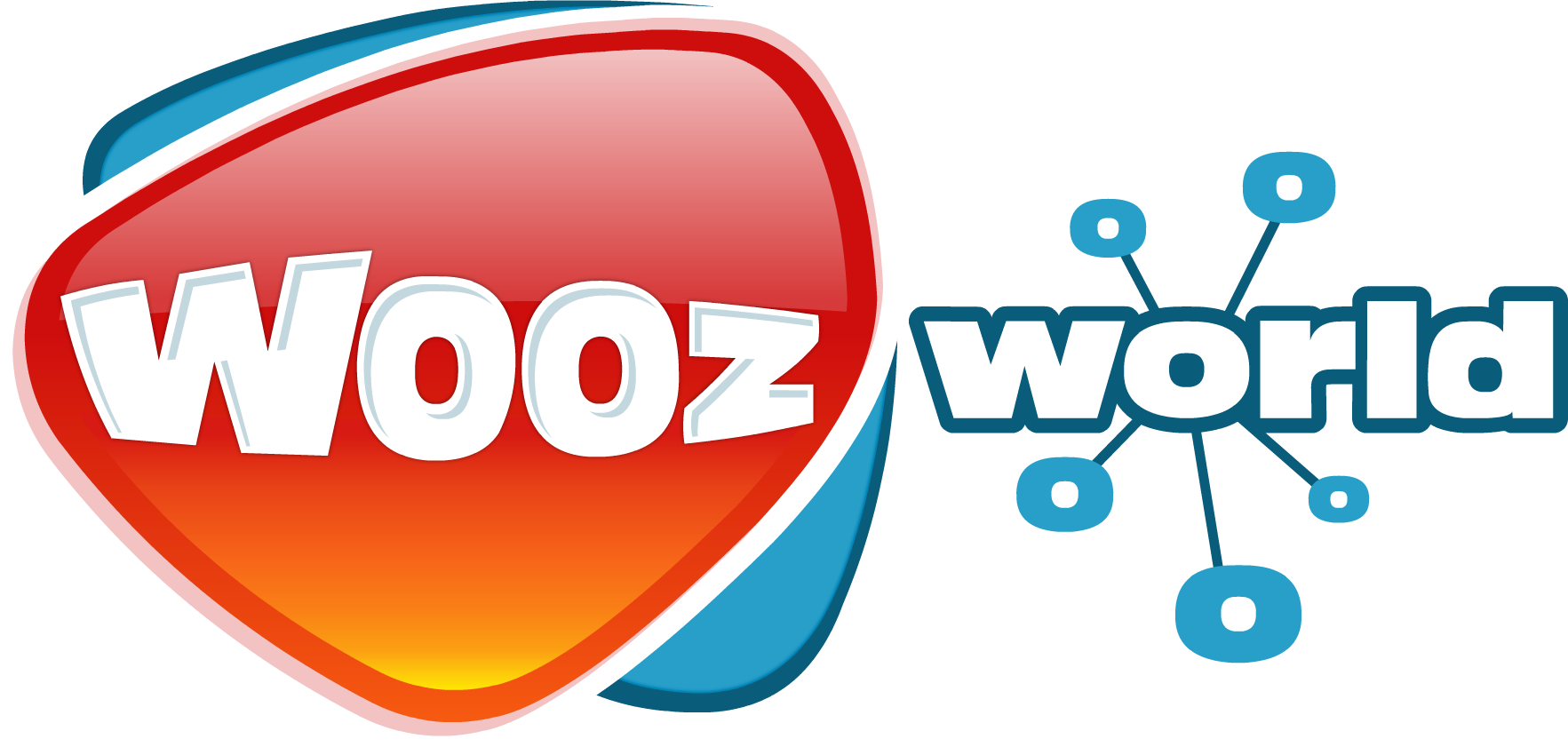
- Industry: Technology
- Genre: MMO
- Founded: 2009
- Headquarters: Montreal, Quebec, Canada
- Key people: Nicolas Lee, Eric Brassard, Mathieu Lampron, Simonetta Lulli
- Website: http://www.woozworld.com/

Woozworld is a virtual gaming community and social network service founded in 2009 and headquartered in Montreal, Quebec. Woozworld allows users to connect with each other through customizable profiles and interactive activities.

== Security ==
Woozworld places strong emphasis on protecting the personal information of its users and creating a safe gaming environment that parents can trust. The company complies with all protective measures set forth by the Children's Online Privacy Protection Act (COPPA) and the company is PRIVO Privacy Certified. These measures protect children's privacy on the Internet and ensure parental consent before account activation. If broken, Woozworld has the right to ban the offending user.

== History ==
Woozworld was originally named KidStudio 2.0, which was launched in 2007. In 2009, it was relaunched as Woozworld. Woozworld allows tweens and teens to interact in a virtual reality based environment. In only a few months, users created no less than two million virtual spaces and organized numerous events: theme parks, restaurants, games, parties, support groups, charitable events, and much more. Woozworld allows users to design their own online realities where they can create their own avatar, do fun quests, trade and sell items, set up new virtual spaces, and create their own businesses. Woozworld was mainly created for young people to express themselves in different ways.

The Innovation Exchange listed Woozworld as one of the most innovative Canadian technology companies in 2011, and About.com awarded it with the 2012 Readers' Choice Award for Best Website for Teens: Gaming and Virtual Worlds. In late 2011, Woozworld launched WoozIn, a Social Network for users. More than 14 million virtual spaces were created by 2011. In 2012, Woozworld was nominated for the British Academy of Film and Television Arts (BAFTA) in the Best Website Category. The company ranked #5 out of 427 on a 360Kid list of highest trafficked virtual worlds in September 2012.

In 2014, Woozworld announced the appointment of Simonetta Lulli as the president and CEO. Previously Simonetta Lulli spent 10 years creating the profitable international business of Habbo Hotel as Head of Marketing.

In May 2014, Woozworld launched the official mobile expansion of the game on iOS. Players could now play cross-platform between web and mobile. Since launching on iOS in May 2014, Woozworld saw 300,000 downloads over that year, almost all viral, reached #1 in the App Store in different countries as well ranking #2 in Gross Revenues for Social Network apps, only after Skype. This made Woozworld the first social MMO (Massively Multiplayer Online) community to offer a full cross-platform experience with continuous gameplay between desktop and mobile devices. In order to adapt Woozworld’s graphically rich world of avatars and virtual spaces for multiple devices, Woozworld developed an innovative Isometric engine and redefined its graphic production pipeline that was initially based on Adobe Flash Technology to make it compatible with Unity3D technologies. While a year later, Woozworld launched the official Android version of the Woozworld app.

By June 2014, more than 25 million profiles were created, more than 29 million Unitz (virtual spaces) were created, and more than 375 million virtual goods were in circulation. In 2015, Woozworld appointed Nicolas Lee as the president and chief executive officer. As the founder and the CEO, Nicolas Lee has previously ready the company for a number of enhancements in technology and growth allowing a successful transition of the service to mobile. Woozworld launched on Amazon devices in 2017, and by this year was rapidly growing in French, Portuguese, and Spanish speaking countries. The Spanish Woozworld server and community launched in 2017. Over 5 million Brazilians created profiles on Woozworld by 2017. Woozworld's English community had over 30 million profiles created by 2017, and more than 500,000 active monthly users.

In July 2019, it was released in an official press statement that Azerion, a digital media and entertainment platform, purchased Woozworld, strengthening its position as the biggest casual gaming company in the Netherlands and a major player in the global market. Woozworld will form an important building block within Azerion’s gaming content business which consists of other leading acclaimed products. Together, these attract well over 125 million gameplays. In 2019, Woozworld announced that it would be releasing a beta version of the game's downloadable client for desktops and computers, away from Adobe Flash, in preparation for its upcoming discontinuation.

Woozworld had a semi-relaunch and transition from Adobe Flash to Unity on desktop, with a new interface and game advancements. This is known as Woozworld 10, the Unity version of the desktop game, launched in December 2020. Members of the player community were invited to beta test the new version. Several new features have been implemented, such as Wiring, Blueprints, resources, music, more outfit slots, profile themes, personalised speech bubbles, reshapable spaces, BestiZ (replacing WooPetZ, with a new pet system and pet features, such as pet XP, levels, tricks, training, crafting, farming, foods, toys, and items), and a wide range of game advancements.

Woozworld was the first MMO to transition to Unity and mobile in 2014 with a cross-platform experience, and Woozworld 10 eventually merged both the mobile and desktop interface environments. The game interface is now customisable, with users having the availability to pick what buttons they need on their menu bar, and the size of windows. Players can now share their gender pronouns in their profile and freely change their avatar’s gender.

In 2024, it was revealed that Woozworld's management had taken back their project from Azerion, which had acquired the game in 2019. David Grenon was announced as the company's new CEO. In 2025, Woozworld shared that their game demographic had shifted to 16+. Restrictions on the chat filter were relaxed, allowing users to express themselves using GIFs on the WoozIn.
