= Kuvalauta =

Former Finnish imageboard website

- Website type: Imageboard
- Available in: Finnish and English
- Country of origin: Finland
- Founder: "Gabo"
- Registration: None
- Launched: 10 November 2007; 18 years ago
- Current status: Inactive

Kuvalauta (Finnish pronunciation: [ˈkuʋɑˌlɑu̯tɑ], lit. 'Image plank') was a Finnish imageboard. Kuvalauta was originally founded on 10 December 2007 and was shut down on 31 August 2010 following disputes with the service provider and police investigations. Kuvalauta was founded by "Gabo", whose real name has never been published.

Kuvalauta operated as a successor to Finnchan, another Finnish imageboard that operated from 2006 to 2009. It was one of the most popular websites in Finland, being within the top 200 most visited websites in Finland.

== Publicity ==
Kuvalauta first gained public traction in September 2009 following the publication of a threat against the Harju vocational school in Jyväskylä. In October 2009, a traffic camera pole in Rovaniemi, Lapland was bombed by a user of Kuvalauta and the video of the bombing was subsequently uploaded on YouTube. In March 2010, over 120,000 passwords were published on Kuvalauta, the passwords were obtained from a data breach against Älypää.

Impact on Finnish internet culture

Kuvalauta was a site where many viral Finnish internet memes were born, such as Spurdo Spärde, which was born out of the Pedobear meme. Kuvalauta made Jonne, a boys name, into a nickname for an awkward teenage boy. In 2010, Kuvalauta managed to make the Kari Tapio song "Juna kulkee" the most listened to song in Finland on Spotify.

== See also ==
- Ylilauta
