= Personnel Security Research Center =

Agency of the United States Department of Defense

The Defense Personnel Security Research Center (PERSEREC) is an entity of the United States Department of Defense (DoD), based in Monterey, California, which seeks to improve the "effectiveness, efficiency, and fairness of DoD personnel suitability, security, and reliability systems."

== Organization ==
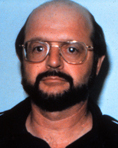
The espionage case of John Anthony Walker (here, circa 1985) led to PERSEREC's formation in 1986

PERSEREC reports to the Office of People Analytics (OPA), which reports to the Defense Human Resources Activity (DHRA), which reports to the Office of the Under Secretary of Defense (Personnel and Readiness).

== Functions ==
This DoD research center:

- Conducts applied research and development to improve personnel suitability, security, and reliability policy and practice
- Conducts long-term programmatic research and development for the human resource management, security, and intelligence communities
- Provides quick-response studies and analyses in support of policy formation and systems operation
- Disseminates research information to policymakers and practitioners
- Develops innovative systems, tools, and job aids for policymakers, managers, and practitioners concerned with personnel suitability, security, and reliability

== History ==
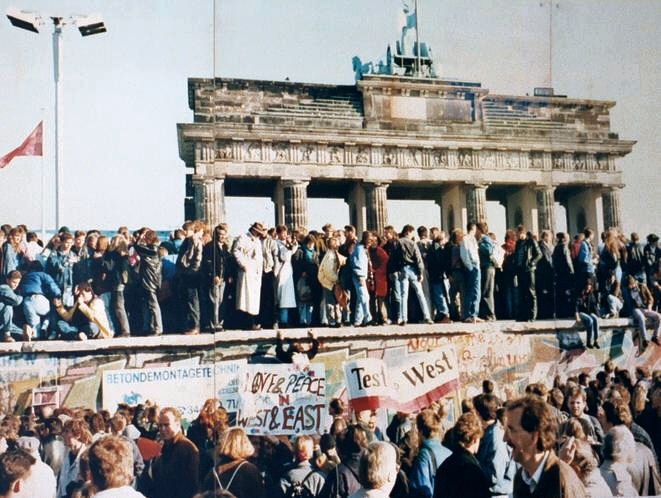
Photo taken during the Fall of the Berlin Wall (1989) near the Brandenburg Gate.

In 1986, DoD established PERSEREC in response to findings by a DoD Security Review Commission (or "Stilwell Commission") to improve personnel security in the wake of the John Anthony Walker espionage case in 1985. DoD chose Monterey to locate PERSEREC near the Defense Manpower Data Center (DMDC) West and the Naval Postgraduate School (NPS) to take advantage of an existing group of personnel security researchers. DoD planned to close the agency by 1990.

By 1992, DoD decided to make PERSEREC permanent as the Cold War ended with the Fall of the Berlin Wall in 1989. PERSEREC responded by helping ensure modifications in security briefings that reflect such changes. PERSEREC also drafted the first all-federal adjudicative guidelines as part of greater standardization of procedures in response to response to increasing reciprocity of clearances. The President of the United States (POTUS) approved those guidelines in 1997 and their update in 2006.

PERSEREC also analyzes and tracks "patterns of malicious insider behavior" since 1947, making PERSEREC a "principal provider of unclassified information on espionage and insider computer misuse to the security community."

PERSEREC has also automated reference and training materials related to personnel security, as well as harnessed information technology, all of which facilitates initial clearance investigations and helps decision-making and diagnostics, e.g., eAdjudication.

== Members ==
James A. Riedel has been a director of research and supervised many publications.

== Works ==
Reports include:

- Standardizing Procedures for Notifying Individuals of an Adverse Personnel Security Determination in the Department of Defense (1994)
- Appeal Board and Personal Appearance Procedures for Adverse Personnel Security Determinations in the Department of Defense (1995)
- Security Clearances and the Protection of National Security Information Laws and Procedures (2000)
- Public Opinion of Selected National Security Issues: 1994-2000 (2001)
- Cleared DoD Employees at Risk – Report 1: Policy Options for Removing Barriers to Seek Help (2002)
- Espionage Against the United States by American Citizens 1947-2001 (2002)
- Final Report on DSS Test of Phased Reinvestigation (2002)
- Improving Supervisor and Coworker Reporting of Information of Security Concern (2003)
- Preferences and Priorities for Professional Development in the Security Workforce: A Report of the Professional Development Survey (2004)
- Reciprocity: A Progress Report (2004)
- Implementation of a Two-Phase SSBI-PR at DSS: An Evaluation with Recommendations (2005)
- Reporting of Counterintelligence and Security Indicators by Supervisors and Coworkers (2005)
- Summary and Explanation of Changes to the Adjudicative Guidelines Approved by the President December 29, 2005 (2006)
