= Jonne Kemppinen =

Finnish footballer (born 1981)

Personal information
- Date of birth: 25 August 1981 (age 45)
- Place of birth: Lahti, Finland
- Height: 1.80 m (5 ft 11 in)
- Position: Striker

Youth career
- 1992–2001: Kuusysi

Senior career*
Years	Team	Apps	(Gls)
2002–2013	Lahti	168	(26)
2002	→ TP-Lahti (loan)	8	(7)
2008	→ City Stars (loan)	1	(1)
2009–2010	→ Hämeenlinna (loan)	5	(2)
Total		182	(36)
- * Club domestic league appearances and goals

Jonne Kemppinen (born 25 August 1981) is a Finnish former professional footballer who played 168 games for FC Lahti.

== Career ==
Kemppinen progressed through the youth teams of Kuusysi before making his senior debut as part of FC Lahti in February 2002 in a pre-season friendly against HJK Helsinki, scoring with his first touch. His first competitive appearance followed six months later in a Veikkausliiga game against AC Allianssi, coming off the bench for Heikki Haara. The following season, he scored his first professional goal in a match against FC Jazz.

He became the top goalscorer of FC Lahti in the 2011 Ykkönen season alongside Drilon Shala with 17 goals each, as the club won promotion to the Veikkausliiga. To date, he holds the record for most goals scored in a single match for Lahti, scoring five against Helsingin Ponnistus.

In July 2013, Kemppinen suffered a knee injury which required surgery. He decided to retire from professional football shortly after.

== Honours ==
Lahti

- Ykkönen: 2011
- Finnish League Cup: 2007, 2013
