= Luis Jonne =

Uruguayan footballer (born 1975)

Personal information
- Full name: Luis Ernesto Jonne Mallada
- Date of birth: 18 July 1975 (age 51)
- Place of birth: Montevideo, Uruguay
- Height: 1.89 m (6 ft 2 in)
- Position: Midfielder

Senior career*
Years	Team	Apps	(Gls)
1995–1999	Cerro		
1999	Nacional	4	(0)
2000	Cerro		
2001	Fénix	30	(0)
2002–2003	Central Español	36	(2)
2003	Deportivo Quito	10	(0)
2004	Miramar Misiones	10	(0)
2005–2006	Fénix	21	(2)

International career
1996	Uruguay	1	(0)
- * Club domestic league appearances and goals

Luis Jonne (born 18 July 1975 in Montevideo) is a former Uruguayan footballer.

== Career ==
Jonne began his football career with C.A. Cerro, eventually helping the club gain promotion to the Primera División Uruguaya and winning a cap with the Uruguay national football team. Following promotion, rivals Club Nacional de Football signed him on a six-month deal.

== International career ==
Jonne made one appearance for the senior Uruguay national football team, a friendly against Japan on 25 August 1996.
