= Azerion =

Dutch advertising and entertainment company

Azerion Group N.V.
- Trade name: Azerion Group N.V.
- Company type: Public company
- Founded: 2013; 2016
- Founders: Atilla Aytekin; Umut Akpinar
- Headquarters: Boeing Avenue 30, Schiphol-Rijk, the Netherlands
- Key people: Atilla Aytekin (CEO); Umut Akpinar (CEO); Ben Davey (CFO); Joost Merks (CM&A); Sebastiaan Moesman (CRO); Julie Duong Ferat (CFO); Gönenç Tarakcioglu (CPO)
- Revenue: EURЄ 551 million (2024)
- Number of employees: approximately 1,000+ FTEs (2024)
- Website: www.azerion.com

Azerion Group N.V., commonly known as Azerion, is a public company founded in 2013, active within Europe's online advertising and entertainment industry. Functioning primarily as a digital media platform, the company facilitates connections between advertisers and a global audience through the application of its proprietary technological solutions.

Azerion also manages a portfolio of owned content and maintains partnerships with digital publishers. The company is headquartered in Amsterdam, with offices in 28 cities, as of September 2022.

== History ==
CEOs Atilla Aytekin and Umut Akpinar met at the Turkish student association at Delft University of Technology. In 2004, they founded Triodor Software and Orange Games later the same year, later renaming it Azerion.

Founded in late 2013, Azerion commenced operations in 2014 with 45 employees initially. Over time, the company transitioned from its origins in social and casual games to establish itself in Europe's digital advertising and entertainment industry.

In 2016, Azerion acquired gaming platform Voidu.

Azerion became a publicly traded company listed on Euronext Amsterdam in February 2022, following a merger with EFIC1, a special-purpose acquisition company.

In 2022, Azerion became the main sponsor of the Eredivisie Vrouwen, the top Dutch women's soccer league.

In 2023, Azerion co-CEO Aytekin resigned after the Dutch Financial Market Authority launched an investigation, citing possible market manipulations. The investigation closed in March 2025, with the regulator finding no evidence of market manipulation or involvement by Azerion leaders.
