= Operation Repo =

American reality television series (2006–2014)

- Also known as: Operación Repo (2006–2008)
- Genre: Reality
- Created by: Luis Pizarro
- Directed by: Luis Pizarro
- Starring: Sonia Pizarro; Froylan 'Froy' Tercero; Lyndah Pizarro; Matt Burch
- Narrated by: Jordan Emil Mueller
- Theme music composer: Alvaro Morello
- Country of origin: United States
- Original language: English
- No. of seasons: 11
- No. of episodes: 286

Production
- Executive producers: Luis Pizarro; Tariq Jalil; Francisco Aguilar
- Running time: 30 min.
- Production companies: Arietis A/V; EGA Productions

Original release
- Network: Telemundo
- Release: October 2006 – 2008
- Network: truTV
- Release: March 31, 2008 – February 5, 2014

Operation Repo (formerly known as Operación Repo) is an American reality television series that depicts the world of car repossession with a team that portrays repossessions from California's San Fernando Valley.

== Re-enactment and authenticity ==
Operation Repo consists of what are purported to be actual stories of repossession incidents; however, the show depicts scripted and dramatized re-enactments in which the cast "recreates" incidents using actors and staged action footage.

== Broadcast history ==
Operation Repo was first produced in a Spanish-language version, Operación Repo on Telemundo in October 2006, becoming the number-one rated show on the network. The show later crossed over to English-language and moved to truTV, where it started airing on March 31, 2008.

Operation Repo also airs on OLN in Canada and RTL7 in the Netherlands and on One In Australia. In Spain it airs on Energy, in Norway on Viasat 4, in Italy on Italia 2 and in the United Kingdom it airs on DMAX.

The eleventh season resumed on December 18, 2013 and concluded, along with the series, on February 5, 2014.

Operation Repo now streams free on Tubi, Pluto TV, Crackle, Roku Channel and Plex.

== Cast ==
=== Sonia's team (May 2013 – 2014) ===
- Sonia Pizarro - herself (boss) (2006–2014) (died 2023)
- Lyndah Pizarro - herself (Sonia's niece) (2008–2014)
- Froylan 'Froy' Tercero - himself (Sonia's ex-husband) (2006-2011, 2011–2014)
- Matt Burch - himself (family friend) (2006-2009, 2009-2011, 2011–2014)
- Carlos Lopez, Jr. - himself (new hire) (2012–2014) (died 2018)
- Ronnie Lee - himself (new hire) (2012–2014)

=== Matt and Froy's team (2011) ===
- Matt Burch (2011)
- Froylan 'Froy' Tercero (2011)

=== Former cast ===
- Luis 'Lou' Pizarro - himself (boss, retired in episode 6 of season 11) (2006–2013)
- Roberto 'Rob' Pizarro - (Lou's cousin, filled in for Matt & Froy when they temporarily left Lou's team) (2011)
- Vanessa Gomez (on the team when the show aired on Telemundo; replaced by Lyndah when the show moved to truTV) (2006–2008)
- Mike (joined when Matt left the first time, left while on the show after a dispute with the R.O.) (2009)
- Ashley Burch - herself (Matt's daughter, secretly went on repos with Matt.) (2011)
- Frankie - himself (came to fill in for Matt & Froy in 2009 and 2012 respectively, fired and arrested for DUI in 2009, fired in 2012 for wrecking a semi and a car) (2009, 2012)

== Production ==
- Tariq Jalil - Executive Producer
- Francisco Aguilar - Executive Producer/Director
- Luis Pizarro - Executive Producer/Creator
- Stephen A. Phillips - Consulting Producer
- Angel Annussek - Executive Producer (in association with truTV)
- Lars Casteen - Associate Producer (in association with truTV)
