= IRC-Galleria =

Social networking website in Finland

- Website type: Image gallery, Social network service
- Country of origin: Finland
- Owner: Herdifier Oy
- Creators: Tomi Lintelä, Jari Jaanto
- Website: www.irc-galleria.net
- Commercial: Yes
- Registration: Required
- Current status: Active

IRC-Galleria (Finnish for "IRC gallery") is a social networking website in Finland. It was founded in December 2000 by Tomi Lintelä and Jari Jaanto as a photo gallery for the Finnish users of Internet Relay Chat (IRC). As of April 2009, IRC-Galleria had over 500,000 registered users and 9 million images.

IRC-Galleria users are required to be 13 years of age or older. The site’s primary language is Finnish. A majority of users are aged between 13 and 22, with the mean age being about 20 years.

IRC-Galleria has also operated in other European countries such as Russia, Estonia and Germany.

== History ==
In 2007, video game company Sulake bought the website. The price of 12.5 million euros was paid in future stocks, but in the end Sulake never went public.

In fall 2008, the Helsinki police started a program in which a police officer created an account in IRC-Galleria to openly communicate with the youth. The following year, two more police officers joined the program. By December 2009, the officers had received about 50,000 comments and questions, including crime tips and reports of bullying in schools.

In 2014, IRC-Galleria was purchased by Herdifier Oy, a company owned by some of the creators and early workers of the website. At the time, the website was reportedly visited by 30% of Finnish young adults, and had about 100,000 weekly visitors. The service is financed with advertising, SMS-based services, T-shirts and optional VIP packages.

== Technology ==
IRC-Galleria is a photo gallery and users are required to have at least one accepted image. The maximum number of visible images per user is limited to 60 for regular users an 10,000 for VIP users. A user's default image must contain the user's face.

Communication in IRC-Galleria is based on short messages, comments, each of which is associated with either a picture or a community. Each user can be a member of 100 communities. Some of the communities are representations of actual IRC channels, and joining them requires IRC-based identification. Comments are only visible to those who are logged in.
