= The Voice TV Norway =

Norwegian music television channel

The Voice TV was a Norwegian-language music television channel operated by ProSiebenSat.1 Media AG. It launched in 2004, alongside its sister channels in Sweden, Finland and Denmark.

It was launched by SBS Broadcasting Group as a competitor to MTV Nordic and ZTV Norway, for the age segment 15–29. It opened in late 2004, broadcasting music videos 24 hours daily. The channel later held an official concert in Middelalderparken in May 2005, featuring Paperboys, Madcon, Madrugada, Kurt Nilsen, Espen Lind, Bertine Zetlitz, Maria Arredondo, Robyn, Melanie C and more. In 2005, The Voice TV commenced programs with television presenters, among others Maria Bodøgaard.

Canal Digital decided to omit MTV from its "basic package" of cable channels and replace it with The Voice TV, effective from 1 July 2005. From 1 June 2007, The Voice TV was distributed by Get, increasing its potential viewership to 1.6 million.

In the Norwegian market The Voice was also used as a brand for a radio network, see The Voice Hiphop & RnB Norway.

The television channel ceased operations in 2012.
