= Ruutu+ Urheilu 1 =

- Country: Finland

Ownership
- Owner: Nelonen Media
- Sister channels: Nelonen (HD); Ruutu+ Leffat ja Sarjat; Ruutu+ Lapset; Ruutu+ Dokkarit; Jim; Liv; Hero; Ruutu+ Urheilu 1 HD; Ruutu+ Urheilu 2 (HD); Nelonen Pro 3 Nelonen Pro 4 Nelonen Pro 5 Nelonen Pro 6 Nelonen Pro 7 Nelonen Pro 8

History
- Launched: 1 February 2010 as Nelonen Sport Pro
- Replaced: Urheilu+Kanava (June 2007 - February 2010)
- Former names: Nelonen Sport Pro (February 2010 - December 2010); Nelonen Pro 1 (January 2011 - March 2017)

Links
- Website: www.nelonenpro.fi

Availability

Terrestrial
- PlusTV: Channel 47
- dna Welho: Channel 59; Channel 101 (HD)

Ruutu+ Urheilu 1 is a package of Finnish sports-oriented television channels owned and operated by Nelonen.

The story of the channel originally goes back to the launch of digital terrestrial television on 27 August 2001, when among the first DTT channels the free-to-air sports channel Urheilukanava was launched. Its sister channel Urheilu+kanava was launched in June 2007 as part of the PlusTV package. It broadcast as an encrypted pay channel, as opposed to its parent channel, which was free-to-air. Urheilu+kanava was replaced by Nelonen Sport Pro in February 2010 and Urheilukanava became Nelonen Sport at the same time. Nelonen Sport Pro was renamed to Nelonen Pro 1 and Nelonen Sport to Nelonen Pro 2 in January 2011. In February, Nelonen Pro 2 was encrypted.

== Current programming ==
=== Ice hockey ===
- SM-liiga

=== Football ===
- Serie A
- Veikkausliiga

=== Golf ===
- PGA Tour
- LPGA Tour
- European Tour
- Major championships

=== Other sports ===
- NFL
- FIBA
- Boxing
- MotoGP
- NASCAR
- Speedway
- Formula 3
- FIA GT Series
- Euroleague of basketball
- Salibandyliiga of floorball
- Superpesis league of Finnish baseball

== Former programming ==
When the channel started out as Urheilu+kanava, they showed sports such as NASCAR, Campeonato Brasileiro, Campeonato Paulista (first time these sports were shown live in Finnish television), Germany national football team, UEFA Europa League, FA Cup Spanish La Liga, Copa del Rey, German Bundesliga, DFB-Pokal, DFB-Ligapokal, Major League Soccer, NBA, WNBA, Nordic Trophy and the Swatch FIVB World Tour of beach volley. It also had its own news service, Urheilu+Studio, which was similar to Nelonen Sport's Studio, but ran from 1 hour to 2,5 hours from Tuesdays to Fridays.
