= Sanomatalo =

Building in Helsinki, Finland

Coordinates: 60°10′21″N 24°56′16″E

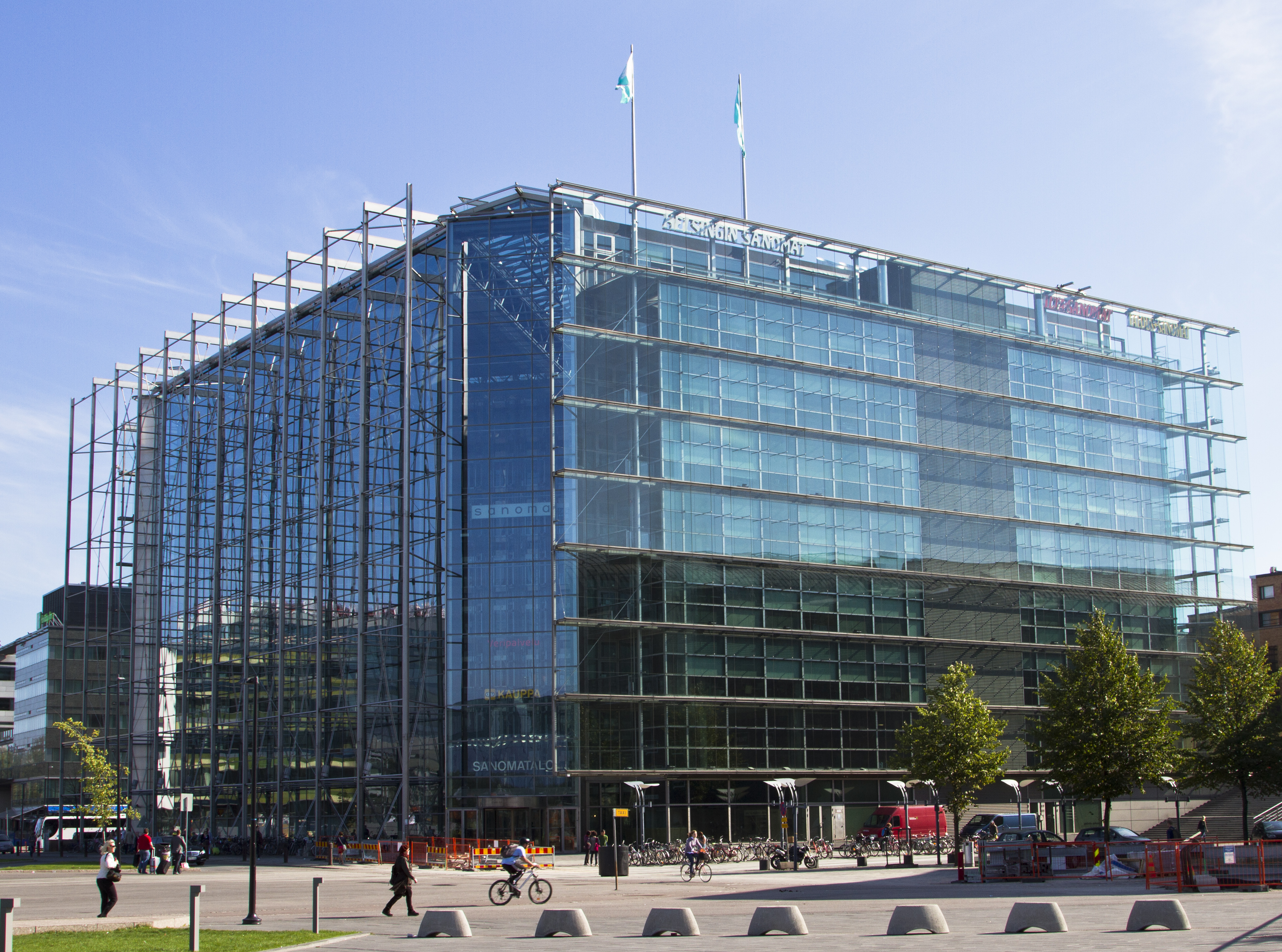
Sanomatalo seen from Mannerheimintie.

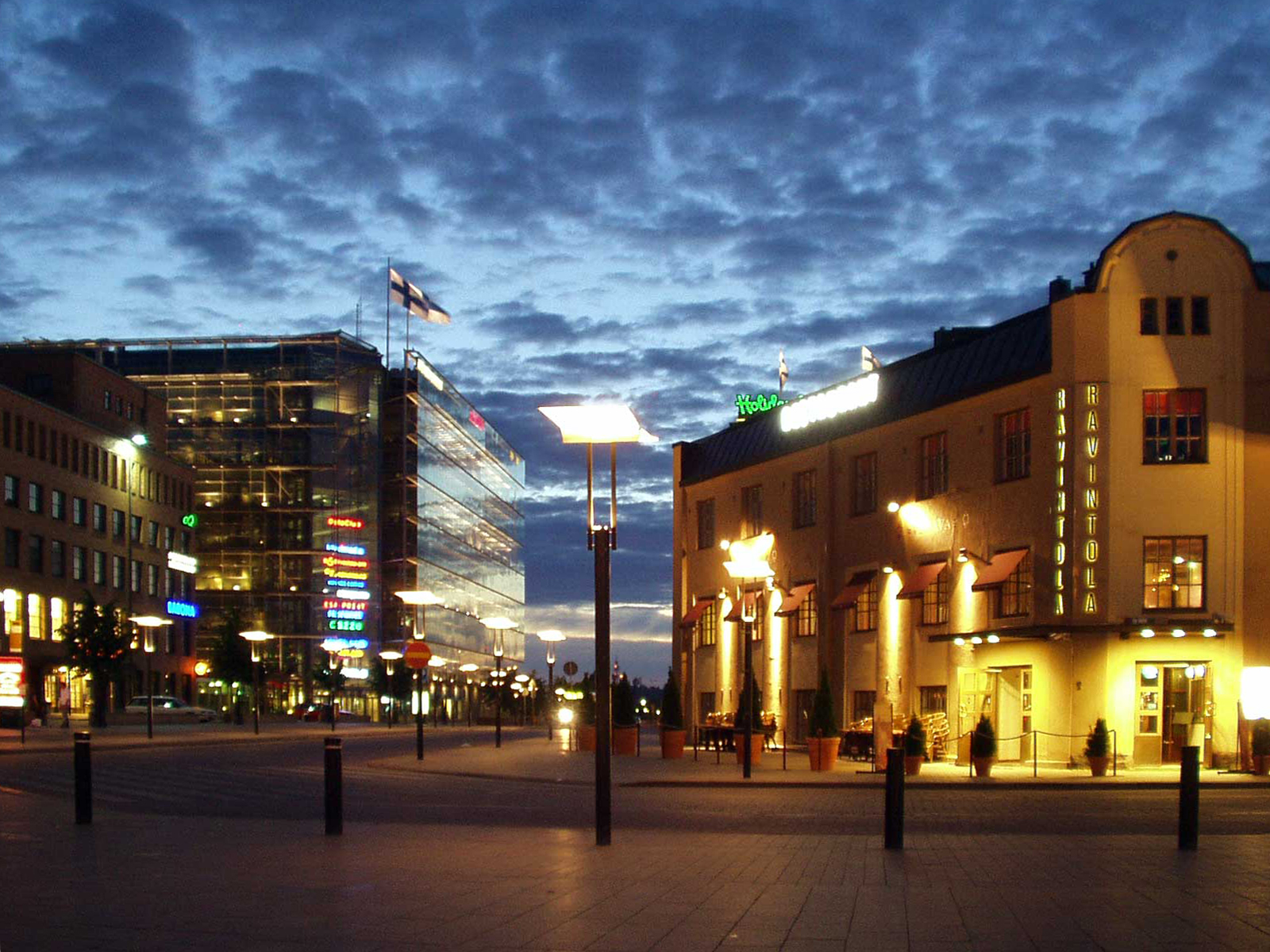
Sanomatalo on the background on the left. On the foreground of the left is Postitalo and on the right is the Czech restaurant Vltava.

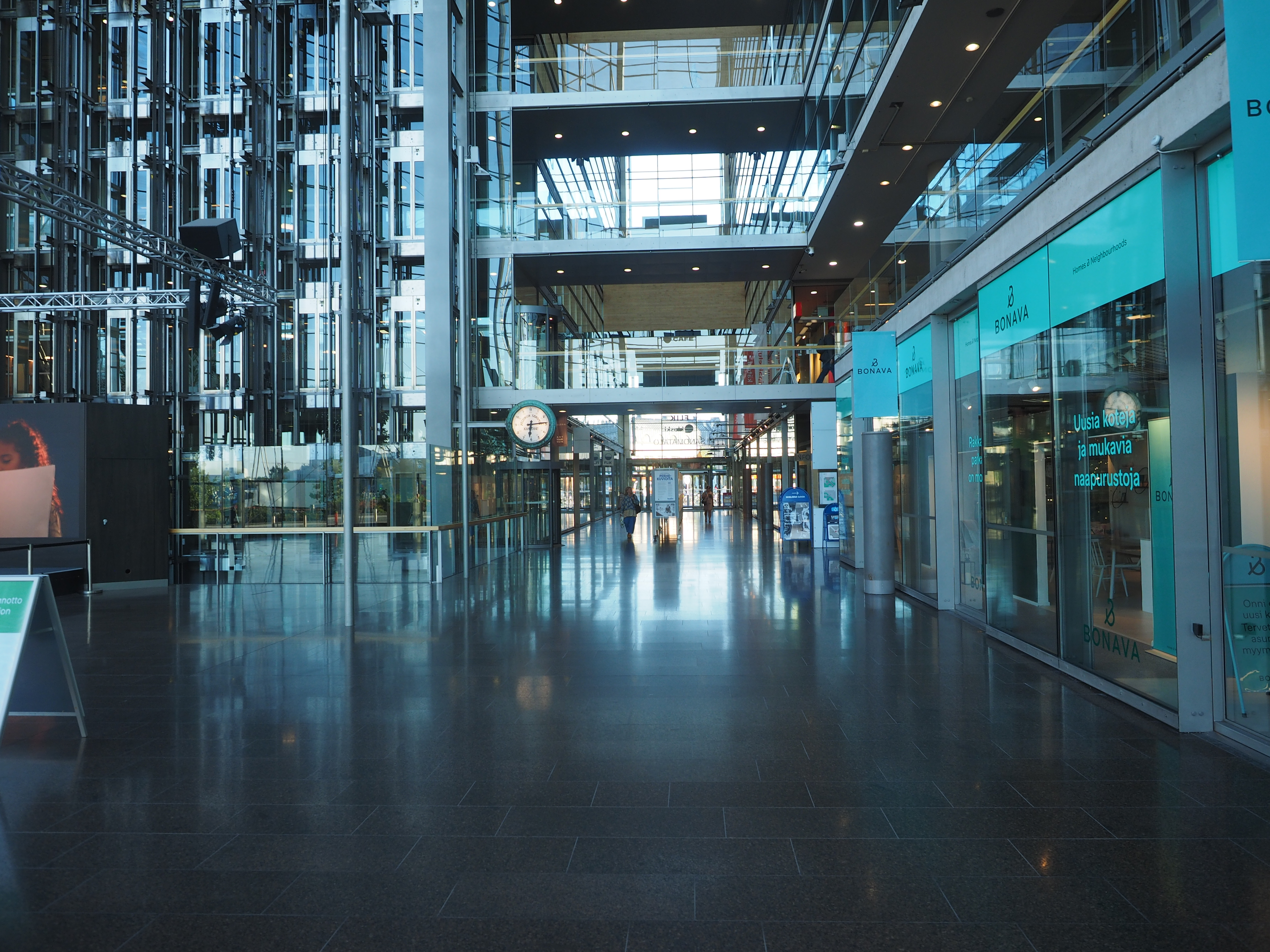
Interior of Sanomatalo.

Sanomatalo (Swedish: Sanomahuset) is a commercial and office building in central Helsinki, Finland, to the north of Postitalo and the Helsinki Central railway station and to the south of the Helsinki Music Centre. It has twelve floors of which three are underground. The building was designed by professor Jan Söderlund and architect Antti-Matti Siikala and it was completed in 1999. It was the first "glassy" building in Helsinki, and environmentalists protested against the glass walls because they might cause bird deaths. There have also been protests against the building because it had two additional floors built contrary to the zoning plan.

Sanoma sold the building in 2014 to a German building fund for a sum of 176 million Euro and remained in the building as a tenant.

The offices of Helsingin Sanomat, Ilta-Sanomat, Taloussanomat, Radio Rock, Radio Suomipop, Loop, Helmiradio, HitMix, and Me Naiset Radio are located in open offices at the top floors of the building. The two lower floors are commercial and exhibition spaces: they include for example an R-kioski branch. The building also has a blood donation point of the Finnish Red Cross.

The addresses of the building are Töölönlahdenkatu 2, Alvar Aallon kuja 2, and Postikuja 2.
