= Ruutu+ Leffat ja Sarjat =

- Country: Finland
- Broadcast area: MUX E

Programming
- Picture format: 4:3

Ownership
- Owner: Nelonen Media, part of Sanoma Media Finland Oy, a subsidiary of the electronic media business division Sanoma Entertainment of Sanoma
- Sister channels: Nelonen; Nelonen HD; Jim; Liv; Ruutu+ Urheilu 1 Ruutu+ Urheilu 2

History
- Launched: September 1, 2007
- Closed: September 1, 2018

Links
- Website: Nelonen Prime

Availability

Terrestrial
- PlusTV: Channel 24

Ruutu+ Leffat ja Sarjat (formerly Nelonen Prime, Nelonen Kino, KinoTV) is a Finnish television channel broadcasting movies and series. It is owned and operated by Nelonen.

== Series ==
This is a list of Ruutu+ Leffat ja Sarjat's foreign series.

- ER
- Isänmaan toivot
- Seinfeld
- That '70s Show
- The Hollywood Reporter
- Hannibal
