= Aki Linnanahde =

Finnish television and radio personality

Aki Linnanahde is a Finnish television and radio personality.

== Career ==
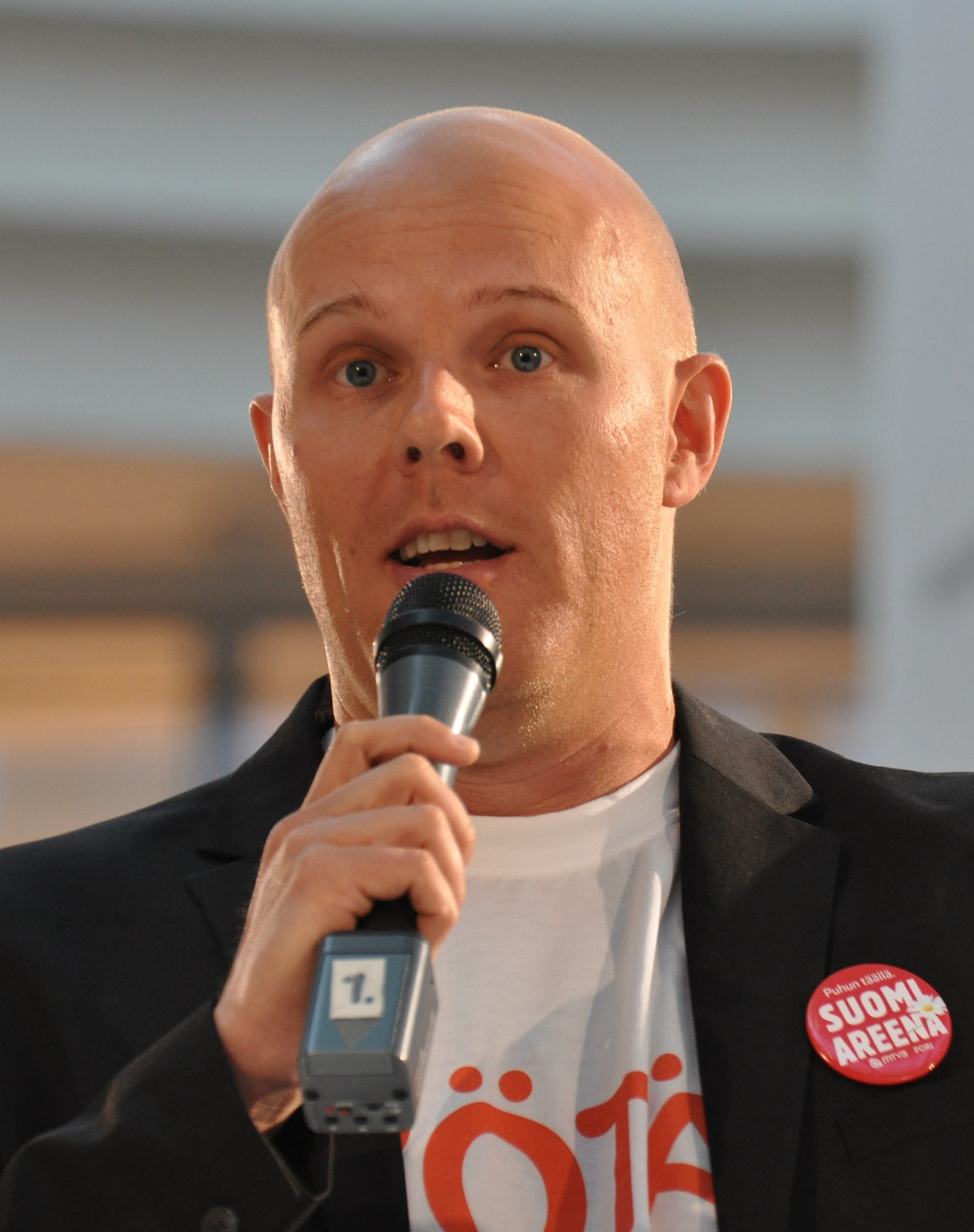
Aki Linnanahde in 2013.

Linnanahde started his work in radio at Sport FM, owned by Harry Harkimo, where he worked as a presenter and producer in 2001–2003. When it merged with Radio City in 2003, Linnanahde moved with it and took over as Radio City's afternoon presenter.

In August 2005, he started hosting Radio City's morning and for his work received the title of Radio Presenter of the Year 2006 together with his colleague Jussi Heikelä. After Radio City came to an end in 2006, Linnanahde moved with Heikelä to Nelonen Media's Rock music station called Radio Rock. There they currently host the morning program Heikelä-Linnanahde -korporaatio (the "Heikelä-Linnanahde Corporation").

Aki Linnanahde worked as a studio host in Urheilukanavana televised Veikkausliiga football matches and URHOtv sports programs. He has hosted two seasons of TV2's Sisu – Stories from sports. In May 2010, Aki Linnanahde was appointed as MTV Media's ice hockey producer, responsible for the design and production management of a new ice hockey product. He resigned of his own accord after only one year and moved to the Yellow Film & TV production company to make television programs. Linnanahde worked as a producer in the Venla-awarded Master of Champions reality show. The program was broadcast on MTV3 from January 2012. In the same spring, Linnanahde produced and scripted the daily Tuomas Enbuske Talk Show on TV5.

In August 2012, Linnanahde returned to radio and started hosting at Radio Nova. He hosted Enbuske & Linnanahde Crew together with Tuomas Enbuske and Minna Kuukka. Enbuske and Linnanahde expanded the program to television as well. In autumn 2012, Enbuske & Linnanahde Crew was performed on Sub's Thursday nights. The program moved to MTV3 at the beginning of 2013 and it was produced for a total of six seasons. The program was awarded the best talk program at Venla in 2014.

In 2014, Linnanahde founded Digimates together with Aku Hirviniemi, which produced websites and digital communication solutions for companies.

In the spring of 2016, Aki Linnanahde returned to Radio Nova and started as the host of the channel's morning program together with Minna Kuuka. In the fall of the same year, Linnanahde worked as a producer in Arman Alizad's first live talk show on ArmanLIVE.

Linnanahte's first work, hockey player Jere Karalahti's biography Jere was published in the fall of 2017. The book was the most listened to audiobook and the best selling nonfiction book of 2017.

In August 2018, Linnanahte's documentary Kuka Muka? about Cheek was released, which told the story of Jare Tiihonen's journey to Cheek (rapper).

Linnanahte's podcast Aki Linnanahte Talk Show started in spring 2020 and quickly gained great popularity.

== Private life ==
Aki Linnanahde was born in 1978 in Tampere. His father was Matti Linnanahde.

== Television programs ==
- Aatami & Eve (writer) 2011
- MTV hockey producer 2010–2011
- Master of Masters (producer) 2012
- Tuomas Enbuske Talk Show, (producer, screenwriter) 2012
- Enbuske & Linnanahde Crew, talk show 6 seasons (presenter) 2012–2015
- Golden Venla gala (presenter) 2012
- Sel8nne film (co-producer) 2013
- Tuulitunneli (presenter) 2015
- Life for a Child concert (presenter) 2016, 2017
- ArmanLive (producer, screenwriter) 2016
- Cheek – Who is it? (director, screenwriter, editor) 2018

== Rewards ==
- Radio presenter of the year (together with Jussi Heikelä) 2006
- Radio program of the year Heikelä-Linnanahde Crew 2009
- Kultainen Venla, Master of Masters (producer) 2012
- Golden Venla, Enbuske & Linnanahde Crew (Host) 2014
- Nurmijärvi animal of the year, 2014
- Social media of the year (RadioGaala), "When Aki stomps, Radio Nova's social media runs" 2018
