= Nelonen =

Nelonen may refer to:

- Nelonen (TV channel), a Finnish television station
- Nelonen (football), the fifth level in the Finnish football league system
- Nelonen Media, a Finnish commercial broadcasting company
