= Kymppitonni =

Finnish game show

Riitta Väisänen in 1990s

Kymppitonni (colloquialism for "kymmenentuhatta" = "ten-thousand") is a Finnish television and radio game show format, created by Spede Pasanen which has been featured on Finnish networks since 1985. The show was hosted by beauty queen Riitta Väisänen during its first three runs and by Cristal Snow in its current iteration. Pasanen developed the programme specifically in order to promote Väisänen. Väisänen achieved five consecutive Telvis Awards for Best Female Performer, for her appearances on the show between 1986 and 1990.

The TV format is a panel-style program: five Finnish celebrities appear in sound-proof booths and try to guess a word based on a clue from one contestant. The clue giver and the correct guessers are awarded points. The sum of the awarded points decreases the more correct guesses there are. If all or none of the contestants guess the word, the clue giver receives negative points.

The points were supposedly converted into prize money, first in Finnish Marks and, after 2001, in euros - with the highest prize for one guessed word being 1000 marks (later €200). However, in reality the contestants only received a standard performance fee, with a bonus fee for the over-all winner. The show even had a charity round, during which the contestants donated their prize money to a children hospital.

== Broadcast history ==
Kymppitonni originally achieved fame on Kolmoskanava and later on MTV3 where it attained huge success (including a Venla Award for best "puheohjelma" = "talk show" in 1986). MTV3 planned to cancel the show soon after Spede Pasanen's death in 2001, but this was prevented by public outcry. The show was eventually cancelled in 2005, after a run of 1093 episodes.

The programme was relaunched in 2009 on SuomiTV and cancelled again in 2011. The official reason given by SuomiTV was that they wanted to attract a younger audience. On SuomiTV, the programme peaked at 10,000 viewers, with an average 7000 viewers on reruns.

Kymppitonni was featured on Radio Suomipop from 2012 onward, as a simultaneous radio show and internet video stream. The show was cancelled in 2016 after Väisänen was let go from the network.

Starting in 2018, the Finnish division of the FOX network began airing a new version hosted by Finnish drag queen Cristal Snow.

== Other variants ==
- Junnutonni – A variant shown in 1991 with child contestants with smaller victory sums handed out.
- Jokamiehen Kymppitonni – Another variant seen in 1991, with contestants being non-celebrities.
- Nettikymppitonni – Shown between 2000 and 2001. Aside a celebrity panel, one contestant was picked through the internet for the programme.
