= Klaus Flaming =

Finnish radio host

Klaus Flaming (born 1958, in Helsinki, Finland) is Finnish radio host. He began his radio career in Yle, in 1988, as personnel of the Finnish radio channel Radiomafia. He worked there from the channel's founding to its end. From 1990 to 2006 Flaming hosted a radio show on Radiomafia and YleX called "Metal Alliance". He made 772 broadcasts of the program.

In January, 2007, Flaming moved from Yle to a channel called Radio Rock, owned by Nelonen Media. He hosts his own show from Monday to Thursday, from 20.00 - 22.00. In this program, there is a theme for each day's broadcast.
