= Riitta Väisänen =

Finnish beauty queen, actress and TV host

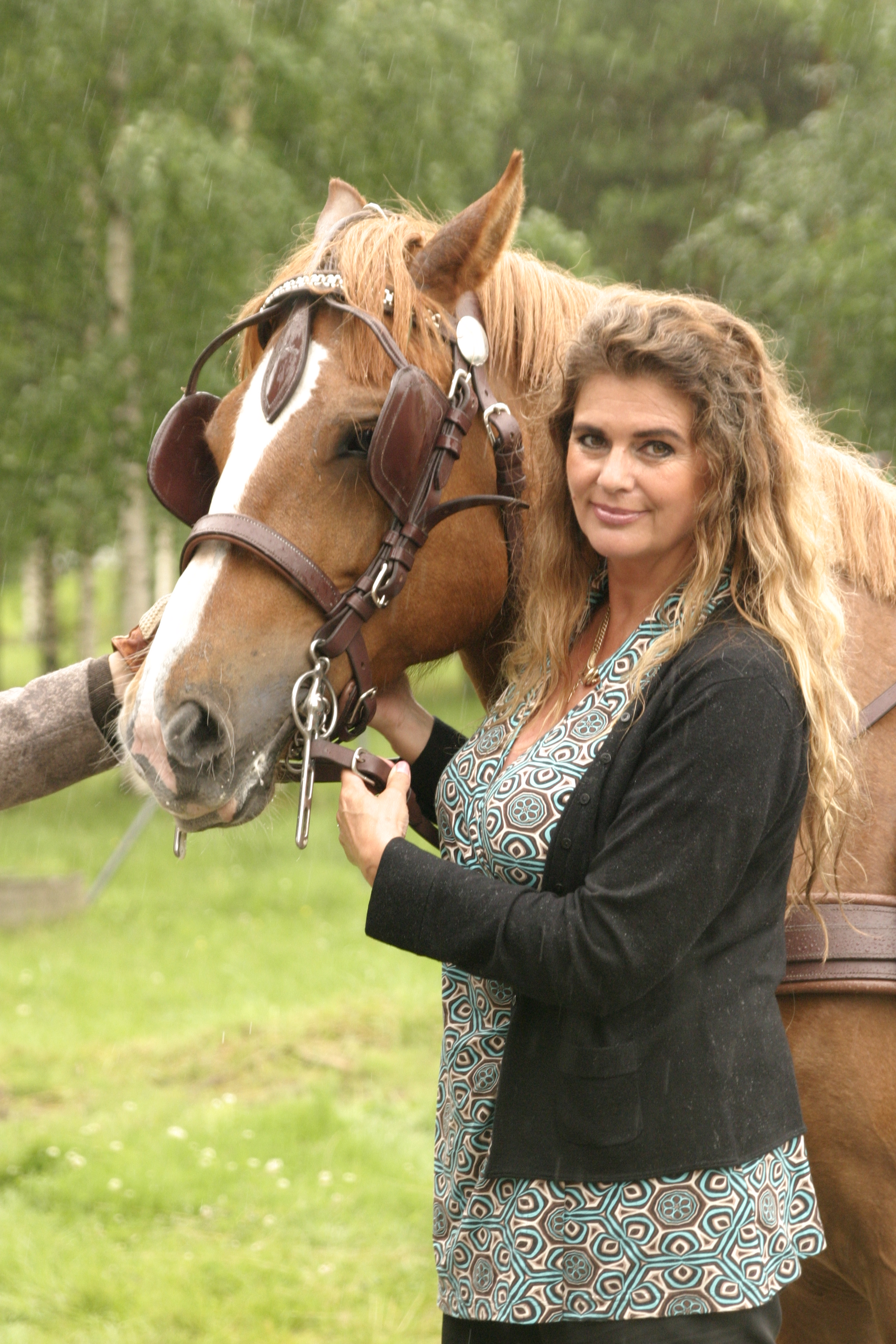
Riitta Väisänen in 2007

Riitta Inkeri Väisänen (born 16 July 1954 in Turku) is a Finnish beauty queen, actress and TV host. In 1976, she became Miss Europe, after being the first runner-up of the Miss Suomi competition earlier the same year.

She is best known as the host of the game show Kymppitonni, which ran on MTV3 from 1985 till 2005, and subsequently on SuomiTV and Radio Suomipop (as a simultaneous radio broadcast and stream-show). She has also appeared in many movies by Spede Pasanen, most notably in the Uuno Turhapuro series, usually in minor supporting roles as well as herself.

She ran for the 2004 and 2007 European parliamentary elections as a candidate for the Center Party, achieving the second highest vote of all female candidates on her second try.

== Personal life ==
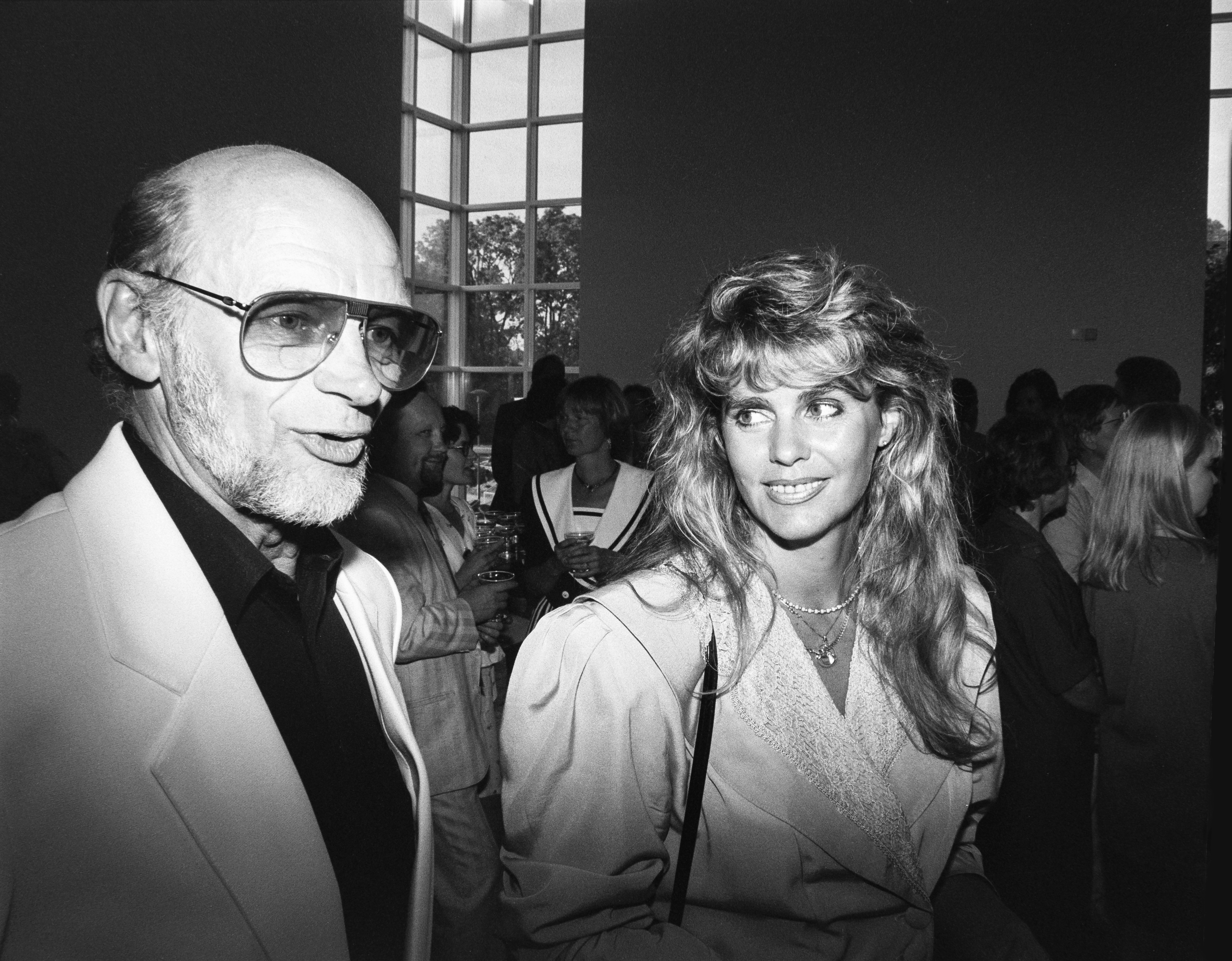
Väisänen and Pasanen at the new Helsinki Opera House, 1993.

She had a relationship with Spede Pasanen throughout the 1980s, while he was living in separation from his then-wife Pirjo Pasanen. She is now married to Erik Mäkkylä and has a daughter, Sofia Vilhelmiina Mäkkylä. Mäkkylä is also a model. Väisänen's biography Miss Euroopan reunalla (2005) was co-authored by her sister Lea Geselle.

She is an avid equestrian and owns a stable in Orimattila. Between 1997 and 2003, she won 23 race events.

== Accolades ==
- Telvis Award - Best Female TV performer: 1986, 1987, 1988, 1989 & 1990
- Kultainen Venla - Lifetime achievement, 2015
