= Elielinaukio =

Square in Helsinki, Finland

Coordinates: 60°10′18.01″N 024°56′21.98″E

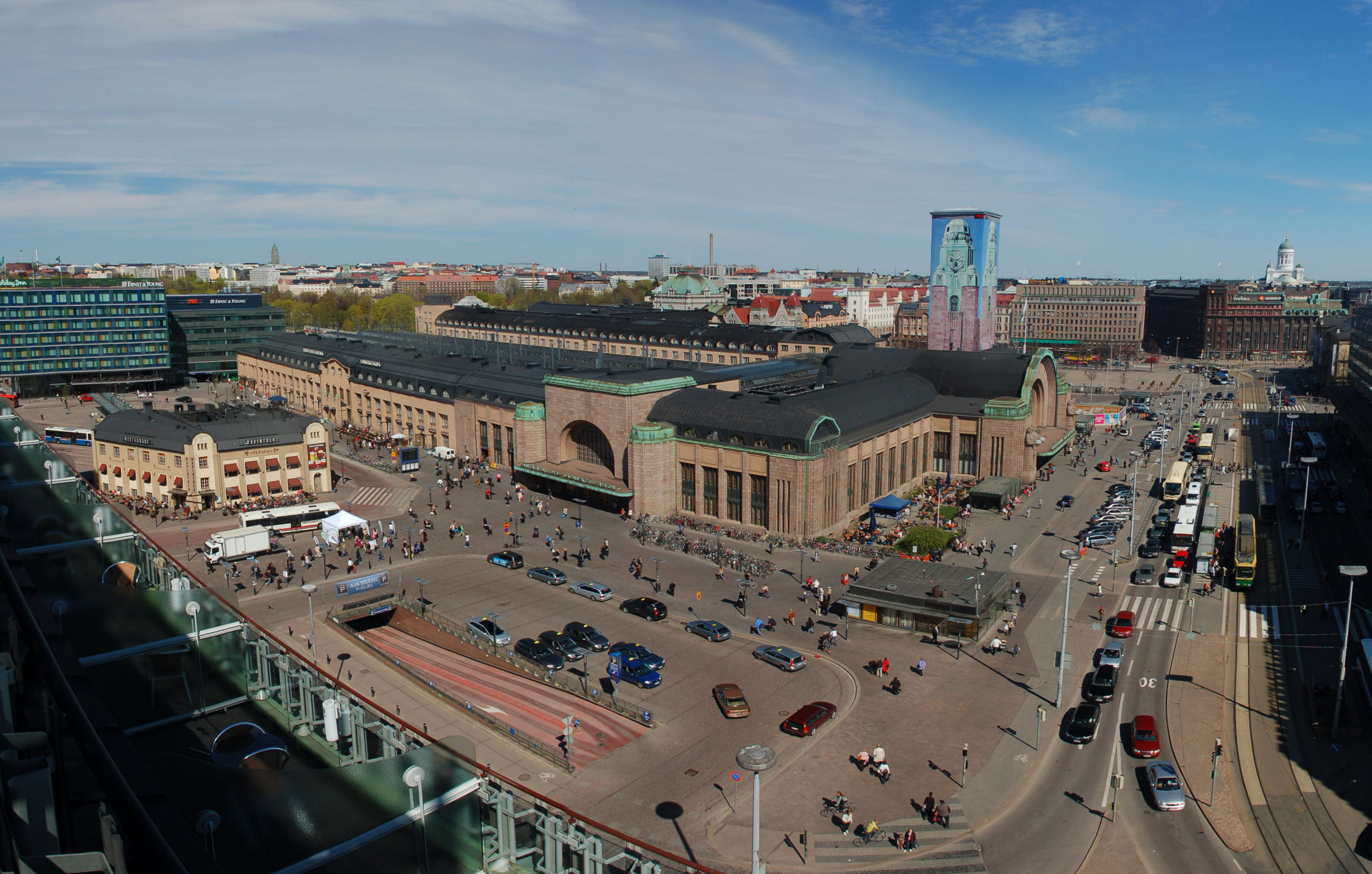
Aerial view of Elielinaukio right next to the Helsinki Central Station.

Elielinaukio (Swedish: Elielplatsen) is a square on the west side of the Helsinki Central Station in the heart of Helsinki, Finland. It is named after the railway station designer Eliel Saarinen. The square is for the most part the departure and arrival platforms for regional buses.

At the northern end of the square is the Holiday Inn Hotel and at the southern end is the restaurant Vltava. On the west side are the Main Post Office and Sanomatalo.

== History ==
On the site of the square used to be a small railway yard, an express luggage wing, which served as a kind of wholesale arrangement area. After its demolition, the area was used as a parking space. The new town plan south of Töölönlahti was completed in 1996, and it also included Elielinaukio. The area then passed into city ownership in accordance with an agreement between the city and the country.

== New Eliel ==
The New Eliel (Finnish: Uusi Eliel; Swedish: Nya Eliel) is a project launched in 2017, in which the square will be developed, among other things, through new construction. Construction can be a business, operational, service and cultural space, but it should take into account the historical nature of the area and preserve the Vltava building, which is more than a hundred years old. The upper limit of the building height is about 44 meters above sea level, i.e. the construction must not be higher than the Post Office. The area enables the creation of new jobs in the city center with good public transport connections. The project is also intended to develop the flow of pedestrian traffic around the railway station. The total construction target in the planning area was initially 40,000 square meters, but it has since been decided to reduce the volume target for the project by about a quarter.

An international architectural competition was held at the end of 2020 to develop Elielinaukio and also the adjacent Railway Square, of which five proposals for the competition were announced in March 2021.

== Gallery ==
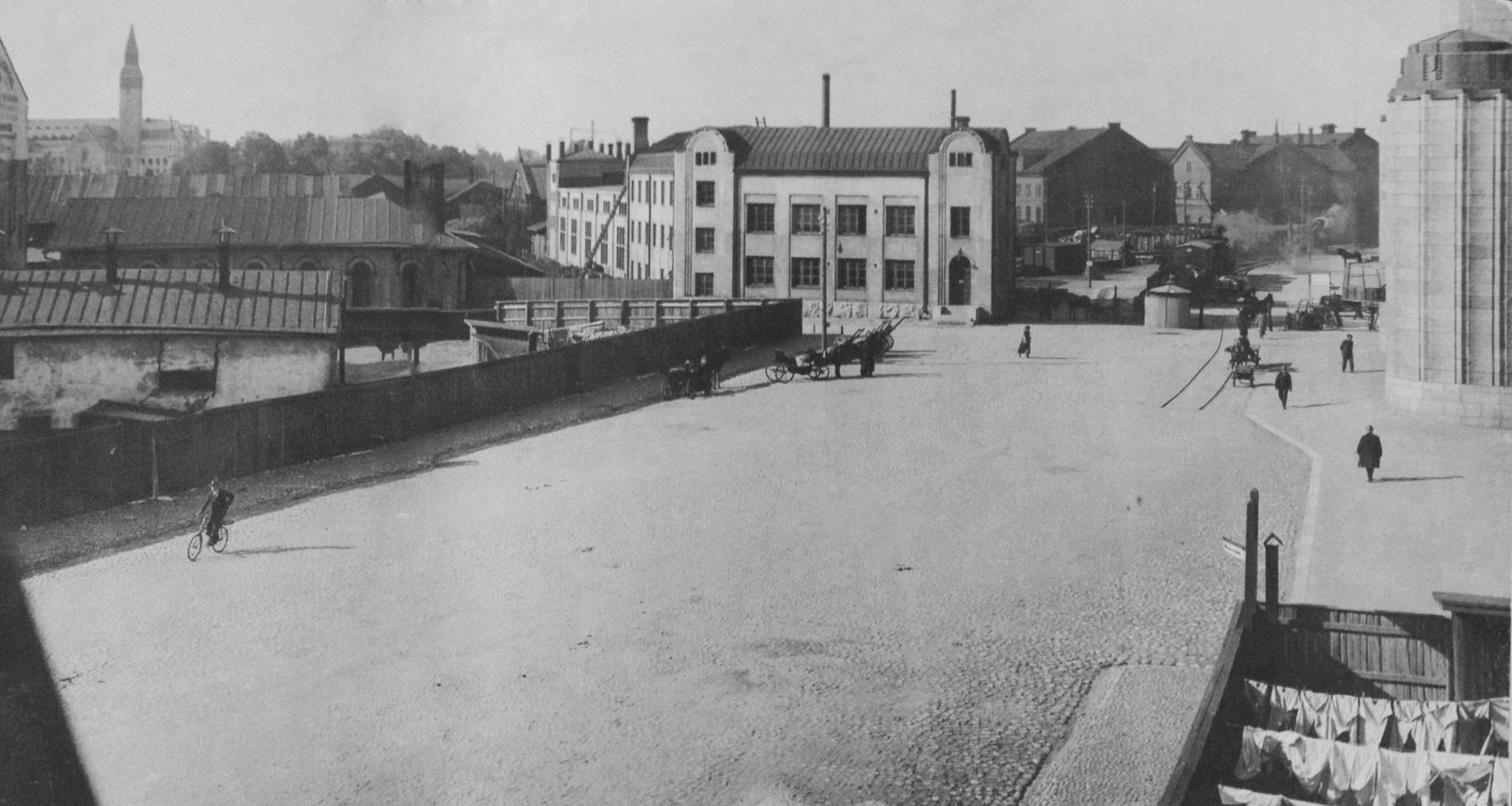
Elielinaukio in 1911.

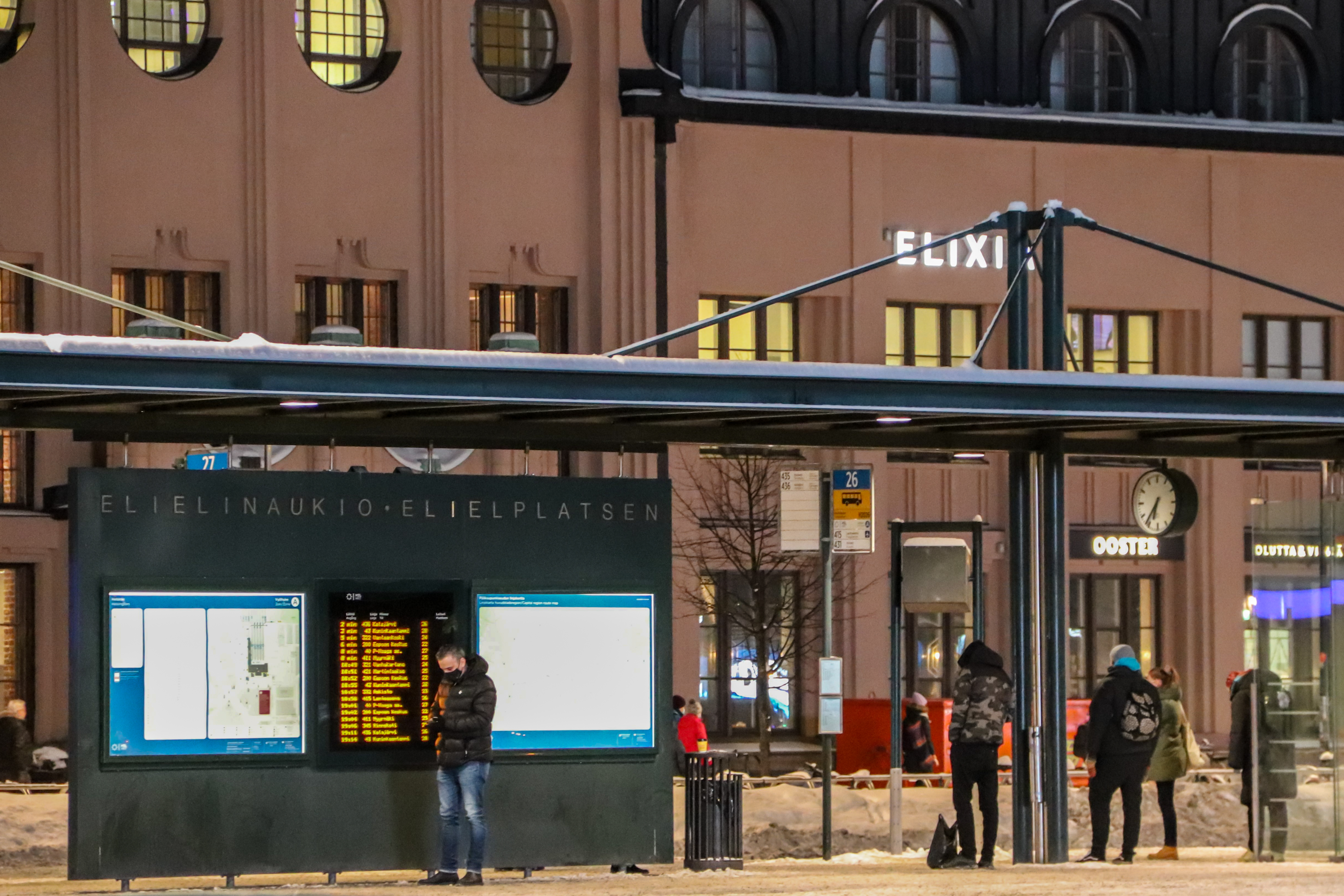
Bus stop at the square.

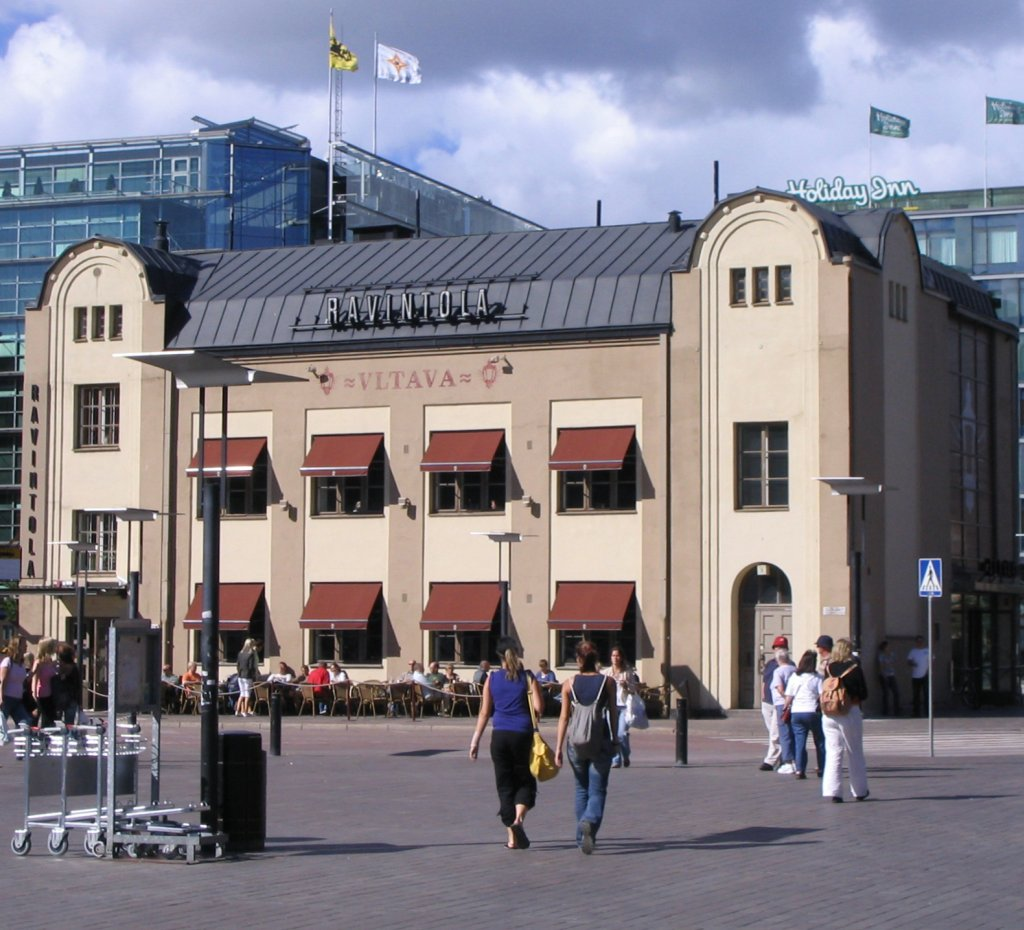
The Vltava Restaurant at the square.

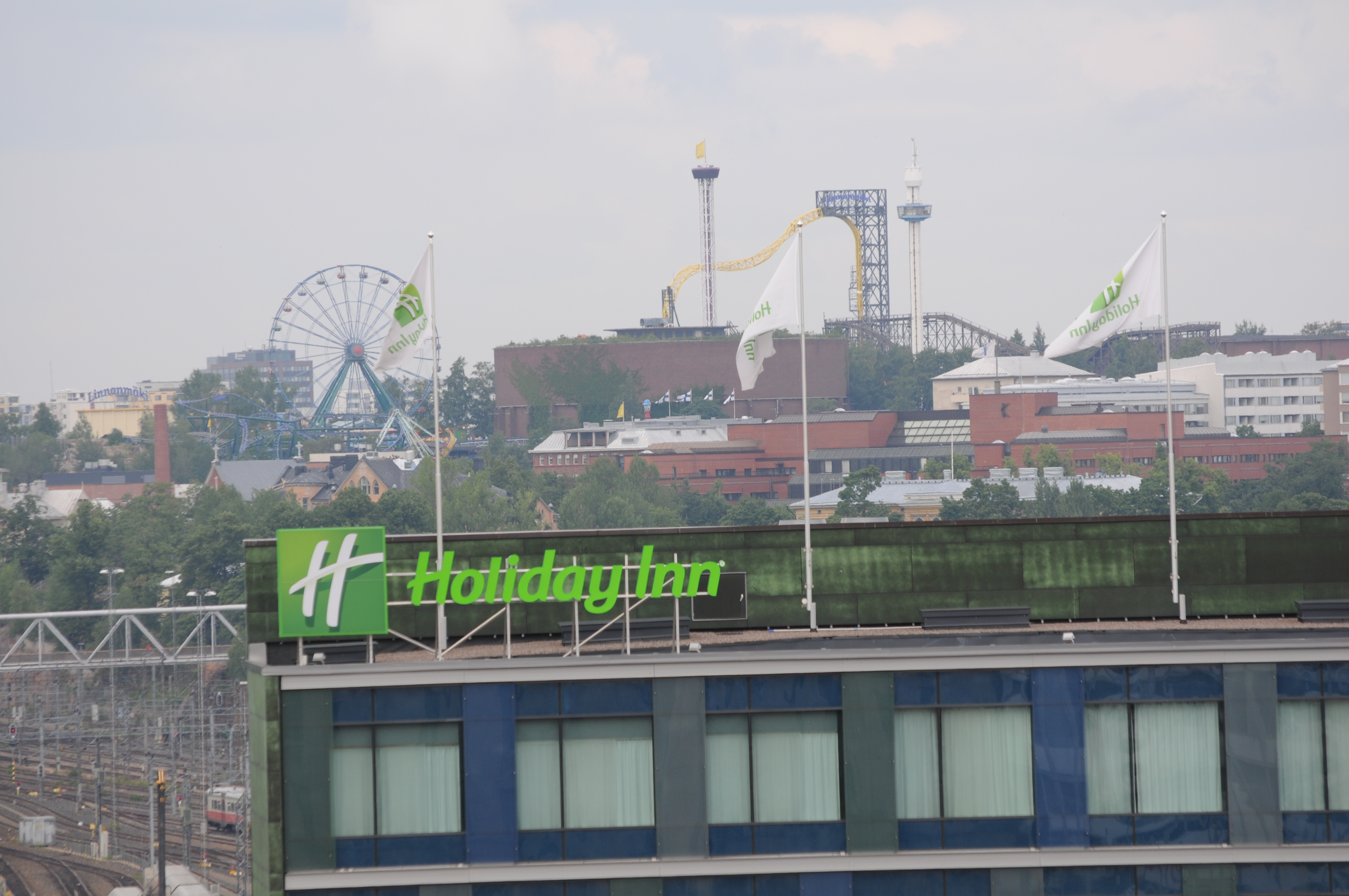
Holiday Inn next to the square.

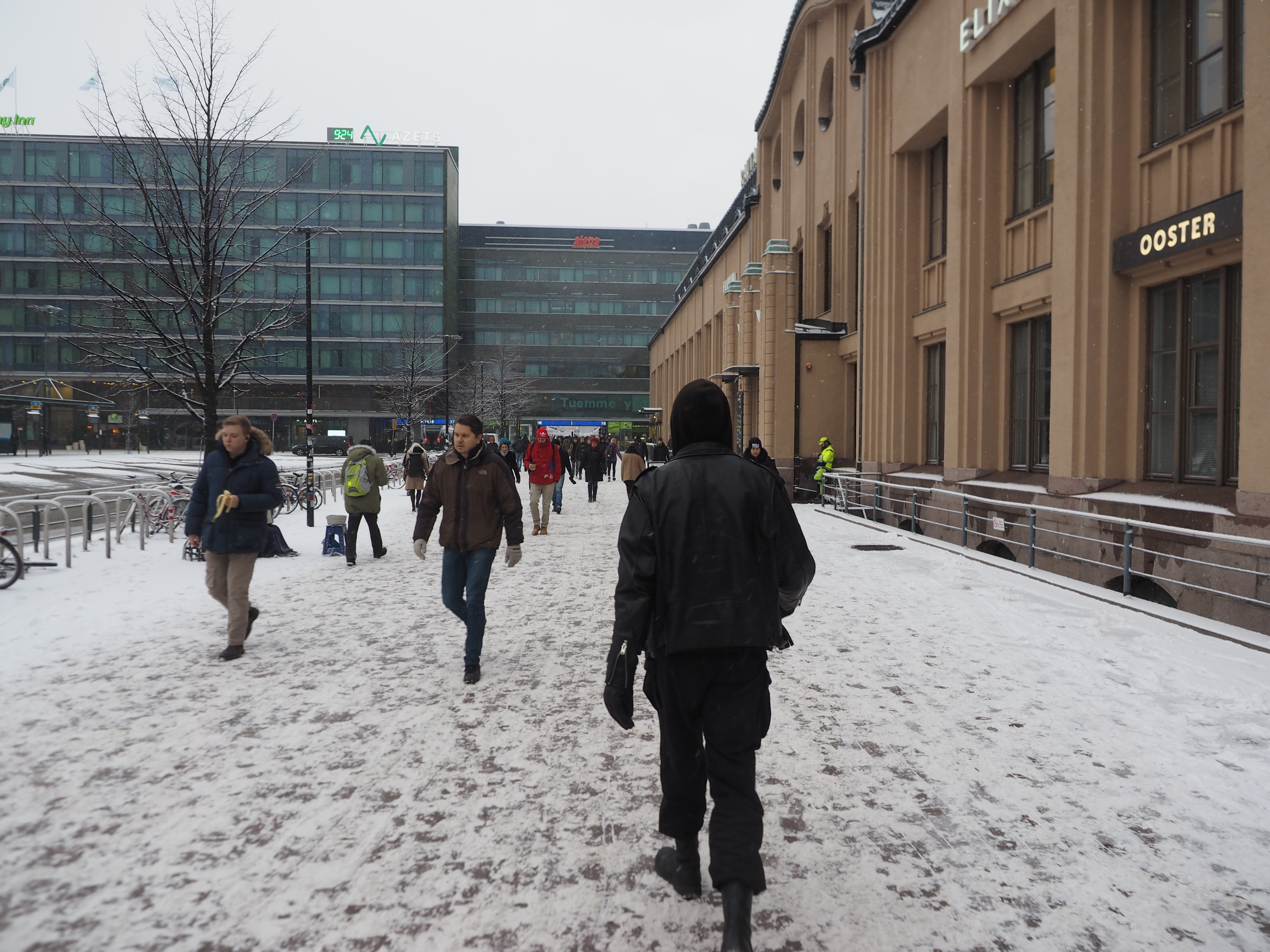
Elielinaukio at winter.

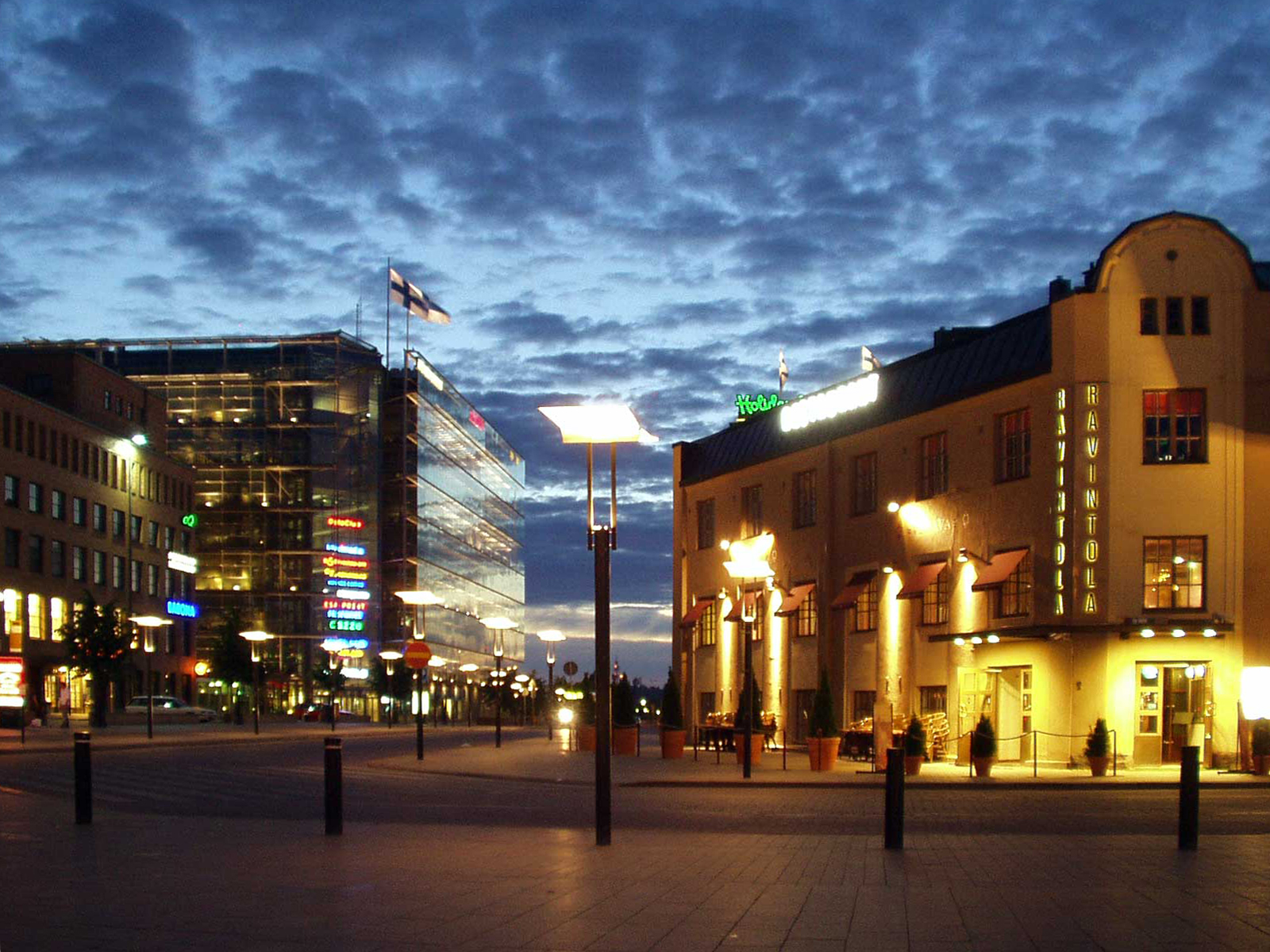
The square during the Midsummer.
