= Mysteerilaulajat =

Finnish television game show

- Also known as: I Can See Your Voice Suomi
- Genre: Game show
- Based on: I Can See Your Voice by CJ ENM
- Written by: Heli Lekka
- Directed by: Jan Aslak-Leino; Joona Kortesmäki
- Presented by: Heikki Paasonen
- Starring: Robin Packalen; Miitta Sorvali
- Country of origin: Finland
- Original language: Finnish
- No. of episodes: 8

Production
- Executive producers: Suvi Oja-Heiniemi; Antti Väisänen
- Producer: Tuire Lindström
- Camera setup: Multi-camera
- Production company: Warner Bros. International Television Production

Original release
- Network: Nelonen
- Release: 16 October – 4 December 2021

Related
- I Can See Your Voice franchise

Mysteerilaulajat (transl. Mystery singers) is a Finnish television mystery music game show based on the South Korean programme I Can See Your Voice, featuring its format where a guest artist and a contestant attempt to eliminate bad singers from the group, until the last mystery singer remains for a duet performance. It premiered on Nelonen on 16 October 2021.

== Gameplay ==
=== Format ===
Over the course of five rounds, the guest artist and contestant must attempt to eliminate bad singers from a group of seven "mystery singers", identified only by their occupation or alias, without ever hearing them perform live. They are assisted by clues regarding the singers' backgrounds, style of performance, and observations from a celebrity panel. At the end of a game, the last remaining mystery singer is revealed as either good or bad by means of a duet between them and one of the guest artists.

The contestant must eliminate one mystery singer at the end of each round, receiving €1,000 if they eliminate a bad singer. At the end of a game, if the contestant decides to walk away, they will keep the money had won in previous rounds; if they decide to risk for the last remaining mystery singer, they win €10,000 if a singer is good, or lose their all winnings if a singer is bad.

=== Rounds ===
1. First impression (Finnish: Ensivaikutelma)
  The guest artist and contestant are given some time to observe and examine each mystery singer based on their appearance.
2. Lip sync (Finnish: Huulisynkronointi)
  Each mystery singer performs a lip sync to a song; good singers mime to a recording of their own, while bad singers mime to a backing track by another vocalist.
3. Video clue (Finnish: Vinkkivideo)
  The guest artist and contestant are presented with a video package containing possible clues by one of the mystery singers of their choice.
4. Mystery studio (Finnish: Mysteeristudio)
  The guest artist and contestant are presented with video from a recording session by one of the mystery singers of their choice, but pitch-shifted to obscure their actual vocals.
5. Interrogation (Finnish: Kuulustelu)
  The guest artist and contestant may ask questions to the remaining mystery singers. Good singers are required to give truthful responses, while the bad singers must lie.

== Production ==
In November 2020, Nelonen Media formally acquired the rights to produce a Finnish adaptation of I Can See Your Voice, with Warner Bros. International Television Production assigning on production duties.

Filming of the show took place at Logomo in Turku; due to the COVID-19 pandemic, health and safety protocols are also implemented.

== Episodes ==
=== Guest artists ===
Legend:
Good singer
Bad singer
— The contestant chose to risk the money.
— The contestant chose to walk away with the money.

Episode		Guest artist (Note: Players' notes: For the returning guest artists (who also include foreigners and former good singers), names are displayed in italics.; For the mixed groups, names who identified as bad singers are displayed in italics.)	Contestant	Mystery singers (In their respective numbers and aliases)						
#	Date	Guest artist	Contestant	Elimination order						Winner
#	Date	Guest artist	Contestant	First impression	Lip sync		Video clue	Mystery studio	Interrogation	Winner
1	16 October 2021	Arja Koriseva	Jenny → €10,000	3. Jari Väyliö; (Entrepreneur)	1. Sedrick Iradukunda; (Rapper)	7. Emmi Hietikko; (Make-up Artist)	5. Pekka Salo; (Opera Singer)	6. Hanna Moisala; (Bride)	2. Kirsi-Marja Niirainen; (Music Playschool Teacher)	4. Priya Koskela; Space Fanatic
2	23 October 2021	Saara Aalto	Iris → €10,000	7. Jussi Ridanpää; (Radio DJ)	3. Kati Häyrinen; (Hunter)	4. Laura Lapinlampi; (Movie Nerd)	1. Tomi Kallinen; (Drummer Boy)	5. Jami Niemi; (Clarinetist)	6. Inka Upendo; (Yogi)	2. Helmi Tammenpää; Soloist
3	30 October 2021	Laura Voutilainen	Taavi → €10,000	4. Noora Pekkanen; (Blogger)	1. Jaakko Vaarala; (Beach Beast)	6. Ida Estlander; (Pilot)	3. Henna Leppänen; (Accordionist)	5. Johannes Piste; (Composer)	7. Tuuli Tuomi; (Courier)	2. Carolina Högström; Podcaster
4	6 November 2021	Irina Saari	Roni → €2,000	4. Pirjo-Riitta Forsström; (Refrigerator)	5. Tobias Andersin; (Children's Musician)	3. Katezi; (TikTok Star)	6. Ville Laaksonen; (Pianist)	7. Emmi Salonen; (Miss Broadway)	2. Siiri Husu; (Nature Photographer)	1. Ville Virkkunen; Theatre Director
5	13 November 2021	Jukka Poika	Suvi → €10,000	2. Lauri Torvinen; (Rack Gymnast)	3. Maija Konnos; (Advertising Model)	6. Maarit Marins; (Karaoke Master)	5. Maija Pokela; (Home Builder)	1. Henna-Sofia Petäjärvi; (Skydiver)	4. Viktor Koolla; (Drag Artist)	7. Kalle Tahkolahti; Mentalist
6	20 November 2021	Ressu Redford	Niko → €3,000	7. Sauli Pietarinen; (Fire-eater)	4. Minny Meriläinen; (Jogger)	3. Kari Ketonen; (Ship's Captain)	2. Veera Lehtinen; (Scriptwriter)	1. Sahar Bedretdin; (Belly Dancer)	5. Linnea Uggeldahl; (American Football Player)	6. Zhanna Folden; Nurse
7	27 November 2021	Mikael Gabriel	Miska → €10,000	1. Riikkamari Rauhala; (Ballerina)	3. Viviane Bossina; (Fitness Instructor)	7. Mila Leino; (Rock Singer)	4. Varmo Varjela; (DJ)	5. Joseph Miettinen; (Trombonist)	2. Eemeli Aaltonen; (Poet)	6. Kaisa Ausmaa; Backpacker
8	4 December 2021	Ilta	Kelet → €10,000	3. Arto Sirkiä; (Kindergarten Teacher)	1. Marla Jaakola; (Embroider)	7. Veeti Katainen; (Athlete)	2. Kaisa Heikkinen; (Navigator)	4. Jussi Bäckström; (Security Guard)	5. Hanne-Reetta Ojala; (Violinist)	6. Antti Kankkunen; Troubadour

=== Panelists ===
Legend:
Regular panelist
Guest panelist

Apps		Panelists in attendance (Sorted by first appearance, with episode designations)
g#	p#	Panelists in attendance (Sorted by first appearance, with episode designations)
8	2	Robin Packalen and Miitta Sorvali (1–8)
3	1	Sami Hedberg (1, 3, 7)
2	5	Alma Hätönen (1, 7); Stig (2, 4); Essi Hellén (4, 8); Juuso Mäkilähde and Erika Vikman (5–6)
1	3	Janni Hussi (2); Tuure Boelius (3); Kimmo Vehviläinen (8)

== Reception ==
Legend:
Highest rated episode
Lowest rated episode

No.	Title	Air date	Timeslot (EET)	Placement		Viewership				Ref(s)
No.	Title	Air date	Timeslot (EET)	TS	EV	Rank	Live	VOSDAL	Total	Ref(s)
1	"Cheater or singer?"	16 October 2021	Saturday, 21:00	2	35	37	0.302	0.324	0.588	
2	"Do Stig recognize the cheater?"	23 October 2021	Saturday, 21:00	2	27	27	0.375	0.385	0.658	
3	"Which one wins?"	30 October 2021	Saturday, 21:00	2	39	42	0.277	0.3	0.578	
4	"Would you take that risk?"	6 November 2021	Saturday, 21:00	2	37	40	0.333	0.347	0.613	
5	"Who's the star of the night?"	13 November 2021	Saturday, 21:00	2	32	34	0.356	0.376	0.673	
6	"Are you differentiating the singer?"	20 November 2021	Saturday, 21:00	1	21	21	0.44	0.455	0.76	
7	"Handsome or lurid note?"	27 November 2021	Saturday, 20:00	3	33	50	0.34	0.352	0.752	
8	"Reveal your voice!"	4 December 2021	Saturday, 20:00	Not reported						

Source: Finnpanel
