= Ruutu+ Urheilu 2 =

- Country: Finland

Ownership
- Owner: Viasat; Nelonen Media
- Sister channels: Nelonen (HD); Nelonen Prime; Nelonen Nappula; Nelonen Maailma; Jim; Liv; Hero; Nelonen Pro 1 (HD); Nelonen Pro 2 HD; Nelonen Pro 3 Nelonen Pro 4 Nelonen Pro 5 Nelonen Pro 6 Nelonen Pro 7 Nelonen Pro 8

History
- Launched: 1 February 2010 as Nelonen Sport
- Replaced: Urheilukanava (August 2001 - February 2010)
- Former names: Nelonen Sport (February 2010 - December 2010); Nelonen Pro 2 (January 2011 - March 2017)

Links
- Website: www.nelonenpro.fi

Availability

Terrestrial
- PlusTV: Channel 59
- dna Welho: Channel 60; Channel 102 (HD)

Ruutu+ Urheilu 2 is a Finnish TV channel that specializes in sports. Urheilukanava was launched on August 27, 2001 and it was especially popular among Finnish football fans since the channel made it possible to watch both high standard domestic and international football on TV for free. Urheilukanava was replaced by Nelonen Sport in February 2010. Nelonen Sport was renamed to Nelonen Pro 2 in January 2011 and it became a pay TV channel.

== Programming ==
The channel televises sports including:

=== Ice Hockey ===
- Delayed SM-liiga matches (The Match of the Month, semi-finals, finals - shown live on Nelonen Pro 1), live SM-liiga/Mestis qualification matches and a weekly highlights magazine.
- Hockey Friday (Kiekkoperjantai) is a Friday night block, which shows matches from NHL, KHL and Swedish HockeyAllsvenskan. Also before the weekly match-up, there is an NHL magazine focusing on last week's highlights.

=== Football ===
- Serie A

=== Track & Field ===
- IAAF Indoor Grand Prix' live and delayed 3-4 times a week.

Nelonen Pro 2 also televises floorball (both national and international), pesäpallo (Finnish variant of baseball), horse riding, basketball, MotoGP and a few other sporting events and magazines.
