= Hero (Finnish TV channel) =

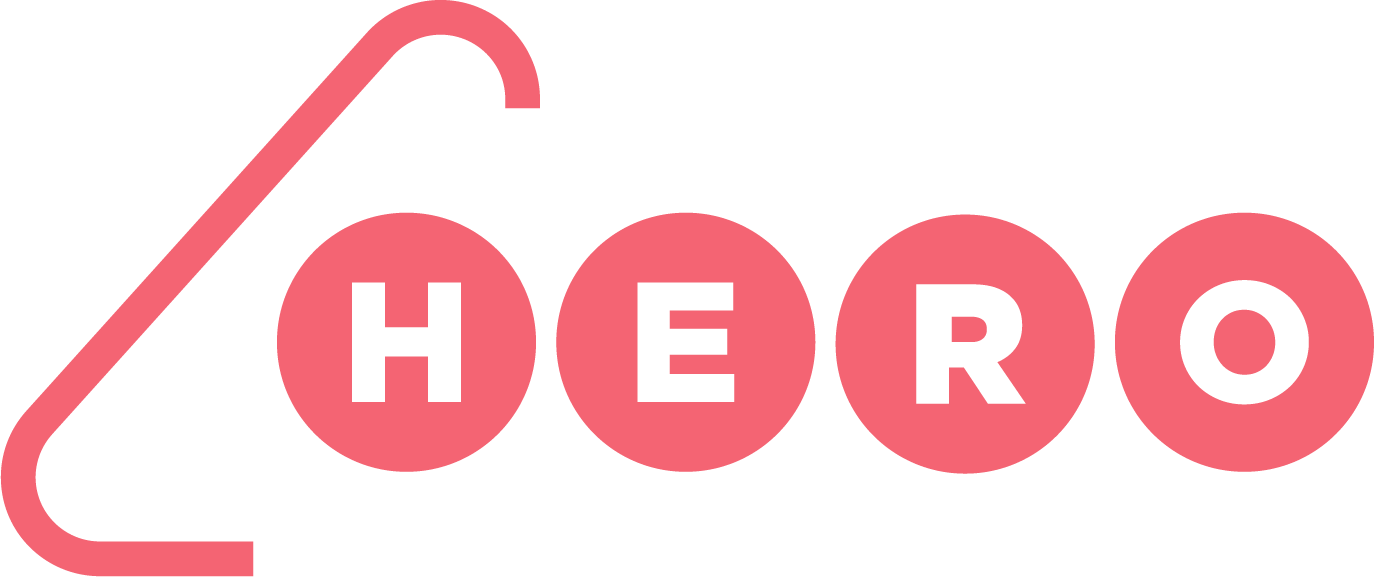
- Country: Finland
- Broadcast area: 95% of Finland

Ownership
- Owner: Sanoma Media Finland (Nelonen Media)
- Sister channels: Nelonen (HD); Jim; Liv

History
- Launched: 10 November 2014

Links
- Website: www.herotv.fi

Availability

Terrestrial
- Digital terrestrial: Channel 14 (HD)

Hero is a Finnish television channel owned and operated by Nelonen. It started broadcasting on 10 November 2014 The channel targets young adults. The channel is available on digital terrestrial MUX C on channel 14, as well as on cable television companies in much of Finland.

== History ==
Hero's first logo from 2014 to 2020

Nelonen Media announced the creation of a new, advertising-financed television channel in October 2014. The line-up consisted of successful international TV series and movies, as well as the airing of several consecutive episodes of the same series on a given day, or spread throughout several days.

Initially, the channel aired from 6 pm to 1 am on terrestrial TV and cable. The cable line-up expanded its airtime on 1 September 2015, starting from the early afternoon. Due to the licensing agreement, the terrestrial feed continued operating only from 6 pm. Hero moved to MUX C on 1 July 2023, and from 1 July 2024, its terrestrial airtime was reduced to one hour, between 12 am and 1 am.
