= Suomen täydelliset venäläisnaiset =

- Genre: Reality
- Based on: The Real Housewives
- Starring: Elena Lukkarinen; Sofia Kazakov; Valeria Hirvonen; Alisa Ranta-aho; Regina Slepak
- Country of origin: Finland
- Original language: Finnish
- No. of seasons: 1

Production
- Executive producer: Sanna Kiiski
- Production location: Finland
- Camera setup: 40 minutes
- Production company: Banijay Finland

Original release
- Network: Liv
- Release: August 24, 2015

Suomen täydelliset venälaisnaiset is a Finnish reality television series that debuted on Liv on August 28, 2015. It is inspired by The Real Housewives.

== Houswives ==
- Elena Lukkarinen
- Valeria Hirvonen
- Alisa Ranta-aho
- Regina Slepak
- Joe Satratzemi Togou, Togou is a fashion designer, twice divorced with one child.
- Fofi Mastrokosta, Mastrokosta is married with one child.
