= Äitien sota =

- Country of origin: Finland
- Original language: Finnish

Original release
- Network: Liv
- Release: 5 February 2015 – present

Äitien sota is a Finnish reality series that premiered on Liv on 5 February 2015. Each episode follows three mothers, often celebrities, in their ordinary life with children and family. At the end of each episode mothers rate each other's motherly abilities and the one who gets the most points is named mother of the week.

== Overview ==
Episode	Mother of the Week	Second place	Third place
1.	Suvi Pitkänen (39.5)	Katri Sorsa (39-)	Jannina Morkos (33.5)
2.	Nina Mikkonen (38)	Susanna (37)	Regina (36)
3.	Heidi (39)	Claudia Eve (35)	Pirjo (35)
