= Vltava (restaurant) =

Restaurant in Helsinki, Finland

Coordinates: 60°10′17″N 24°56′22″E

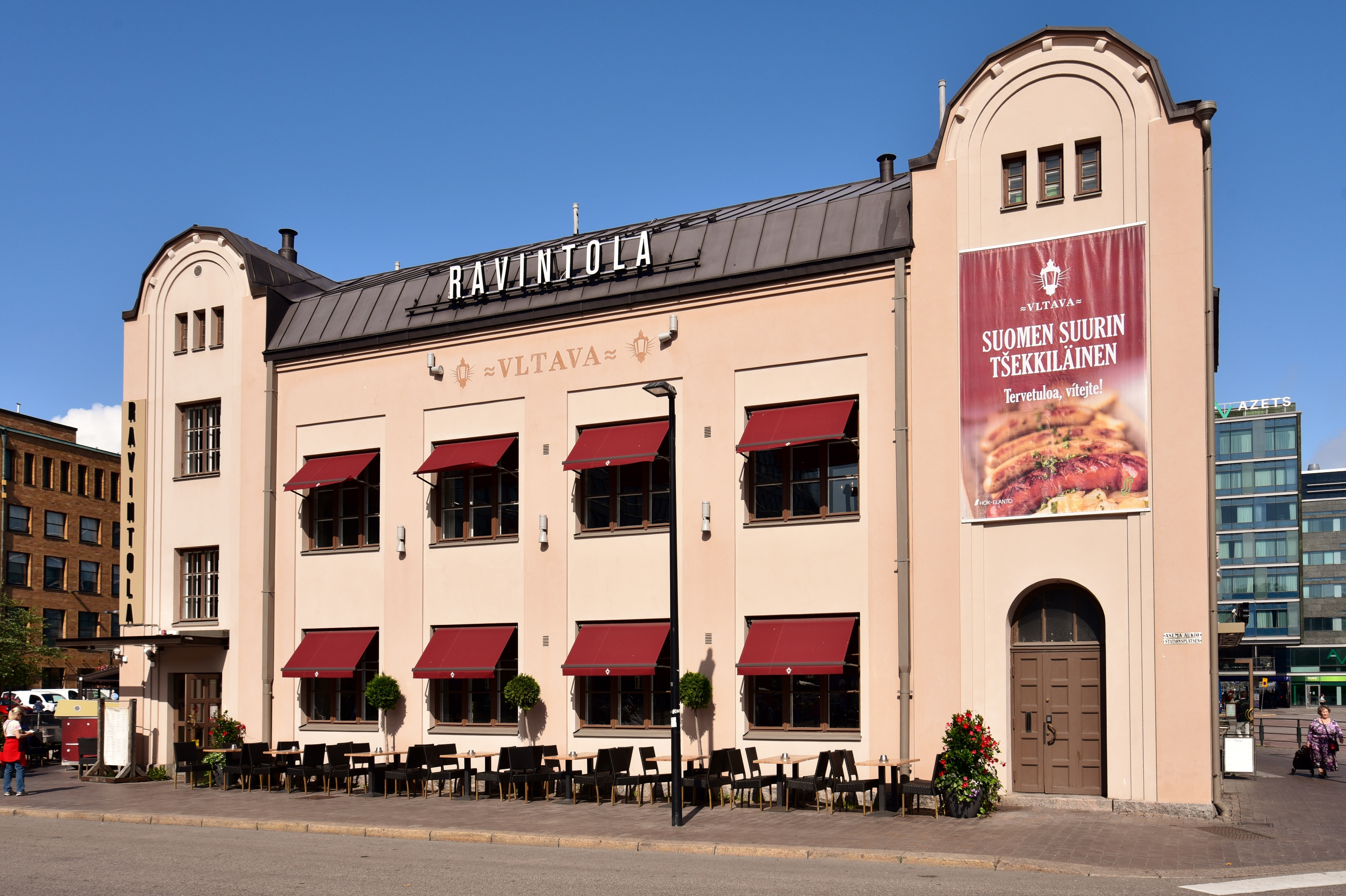
The restaurant in 2019

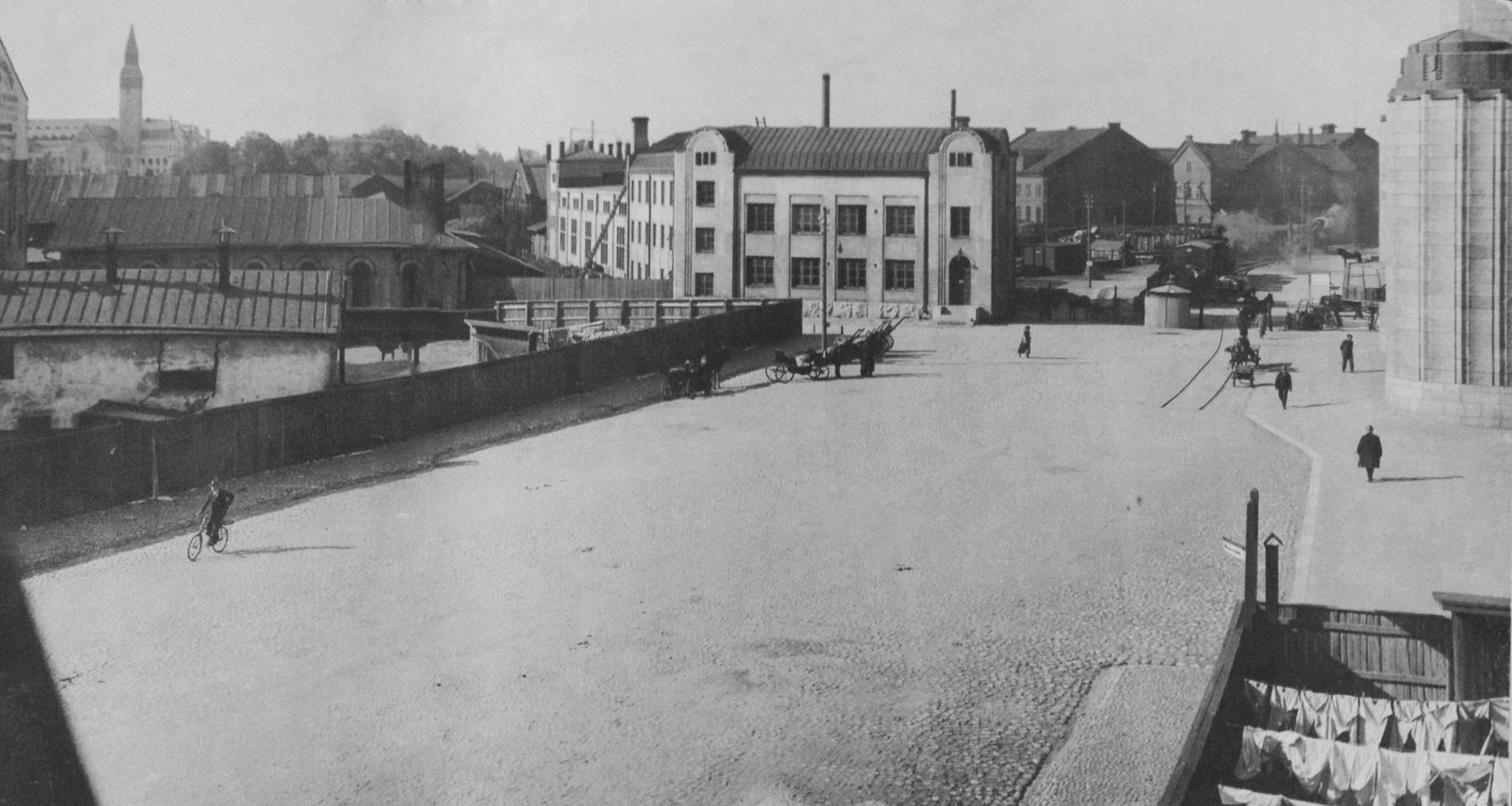
The cargo storehouse of the Finnish railways in 1911

Vltava is the largest Czech cuisine restaurant in Finland, located in central Helsinki. It was opened in the spring of 2005 to a Jugend architecture building protected by the Finnish National Board of Antiquities, located on the Elielinaukio square, between the Helsinki Central railway station and the main building of the Finnish post office. The name of the restaurant comes from the Vltava River, the longest Czech river. The restaurant is owned by HOK-Elanto.

== Spaces ==
The restaurant has 389 customer spaces indoors and 126 on its summer terrace. There are five restaurant facilities on four floors. The interior has been designed by interior architect Pekka Perjo.

== History of the building ==
The restaurant is located in a Jugend building protected by the National Board of Antiquities. The building has previously served as Finnair's city terminal and VR Group's cargo storehold. The building had stood at the site since the early 20th century when it was part of an industrial and railroad area stretching from the railway station to the Töölönlahti bay. In 1978, the building's extension towards Töölönlahti was dismantled. The extension had hosted VR's construction works which had made locomotives up to the 1950s.

The exact date of the building's construction is not known: depending on the source, it has been cited as either 1898, 1899, 1909, or 1911. The designer has been cited as either Eliel Saarinen, who designed the railway station nearby, or Bruno Granholm, the chief architect of the board of the Finnish railways.
