= Nelonen Media =

Finnish media company

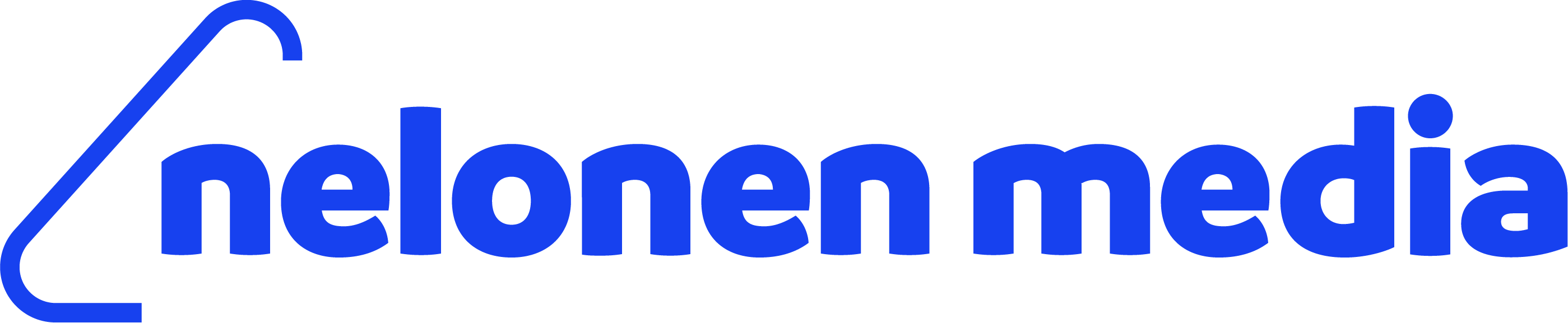
- Type: Private (subsidiary of Sanoma)
- Industry: Media
- Founded: 2002
- Headquarters: Helsinki, Finland
- Key people: Kari Laakso (President)
- Services: Broadcasting
- Owner: Sanoma
- Parent: Sanoma Media Finland
- Website: www.nelonenmedia.fi

Nelonen Media is a Finnish commercial broadcasting company owned by Sanoma Media Finland, which is a part of Sanoma group.

== Operations ==
=== Free-to-air television channels ===
- Nelonen (and high definition simulcast channel Nelonen HD)
- Jim
- Liv
- Hero

=== Radio networks ===
- Radio Suomipop
- Radio Rock
- Radio Aalto
- Helmiradio (semi-nationwide)
- Loop (semi-nationwide)
- HitMix (semi-nationwide)
- Groove FM
- Easy Hits
- Classic Hits
- Aito Iskelmä
- Kantriradio

=== Online streaming and on-demand ===
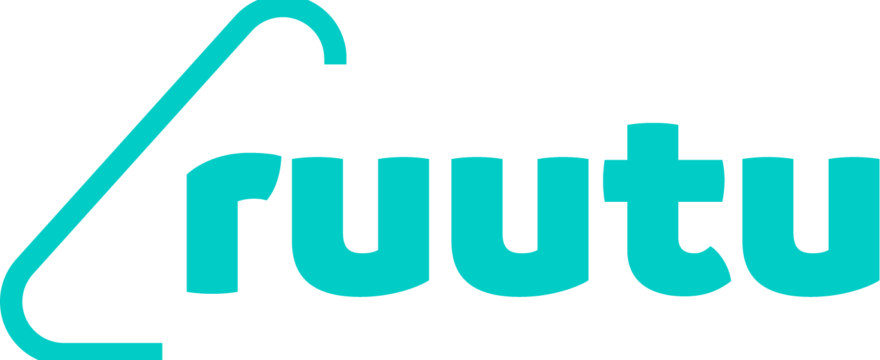
Ruutu logo (2020)

- Ruutu: (previously Ruutu.fi) Ruutu is an online catch-up and video on demand service of Nelonen Media's TV channels. The service also offers a premium subscription plan named Ruutu+. Previously, it also offered Nelonen Media's radio programmes on demand, before it was spun off into Supla.fi.
- Supla: (previously Supla.fi) Supla is Nelonen Media's streaming service for audio content.

== Former operations ==

=== Premium television channels ===
Nelonen Media's premium television operation was previously named Nelonen Paketti. In March 2017, all of linear premium channels were renamed Ruutu+ after Ruutu.fi's premium plan, before they were shut down on 1 September 2018.

- Ruutu+ Leffat ja Sarjat
- Ruutu+ Lapset
- Ruutu+ Dokkarit
- Ruutu+ Urheilu: a group of sports channels that consisted of two main channels (Ruutu+ Urheilu 1, Ruutu+ Urheilu 2) and six extra channels (Ruutu+ Urheilu 3 to 8)
