= Radio Rock =

Finland
- Broadcast area: Half-Finland
- Frequency: Varies

Programming
- Format: Rock music

Ownership
- Owner: Nelonen Media

History
- First air date: 1 January 2007

Links
- Website: www.radiorock.fi

Radio Rock is a Finnish rock music radio station owned by Nelonen Media, a part of the media group Sanoma.

Radio Rock's broadcasting began on 1 January 2007, at 0.00, with the official spoken programs beginning on 15 January 2007. The first song that the station played was Metallica's "Master of Puppets". Radio Rock's hosts are mostly former Radio City and YleX personnel like Klaus Flaming, Jussi Heikelä, Aki Linnanahde, and Jone Nikula. Radio Rock's official mascot in its commercials is called "rockrooster."

Radio Rock began its broadcast on the Internet on 2 July 2007.
