= Radio Suomipop =

Radio station in Finland

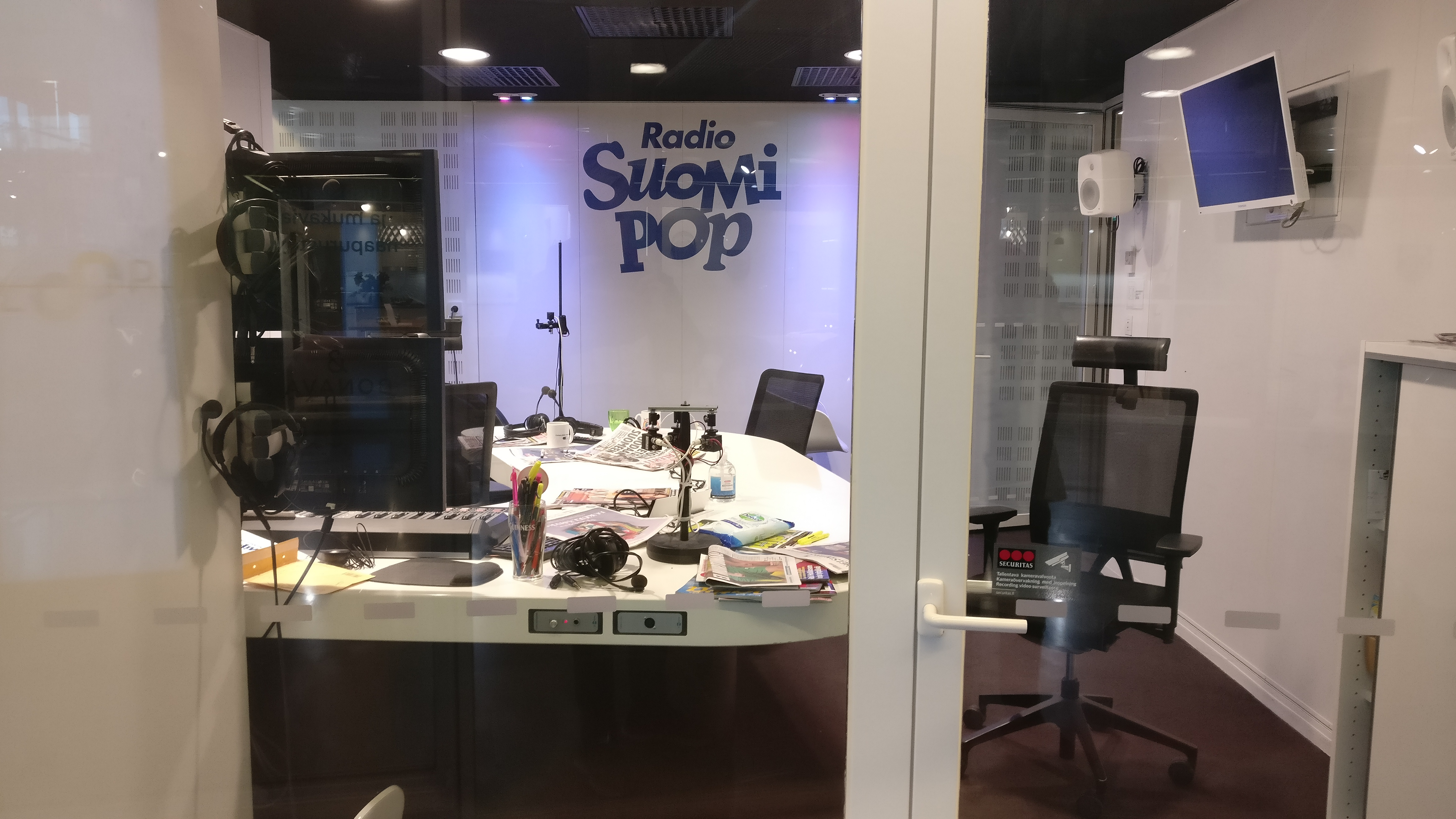
Radio Suomipop Studio

Radio Suomipop is a Finnish commercial radio station that is aimed at the 25-44 year old market and which broadcasts both traditionally and via an online presence. It has been in operation since 2001.

It is owned by Sanoma Media Finland and operated co-operatively with Nelonen Media. Its affiliate stations include Loop, Metro Helsinki, Groove FM, Radio Aalto and Radio Rock.

According to figures for the quarter ending December 2015, the station reached an average 1,300,000 listeners per week making it the most listened to station in Finland.
