= Liv (TV channel) =

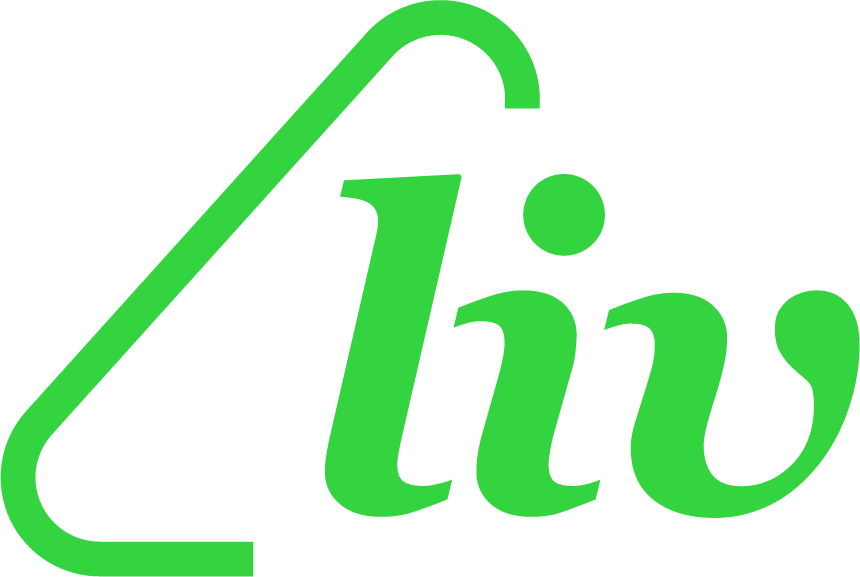
- Country: Finland
- Broadcast area: 95% of Finland

Ownership
- Owner: Sanoma Media Finland (Nelonen Media)
- Sister channels: Nelonen (HD); Jim; Hero

History
- Launched: 14 February 2009

Links
- Website: www.livtv.fi

Availability

Terrestrial
- Digital terrestrial: Channel 8 (HD); Channel 28

Liv is a Finnish television channel owned and operated by Nelonen. Liv started broadcasting on 14 February 2009 and it is especially designed for women viewers, featuring series such as Arvostele Mun Illallinen Suomessa, Kumman kaa, Äitien sota and Suomen täydelliset venäläisnaiset.

== Logos ==
Liv's first logo from 2009 to 2013

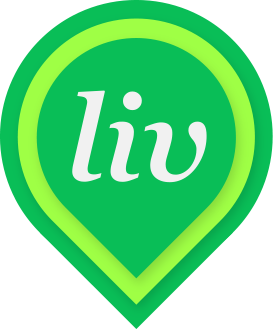
Liv's second logo from 2013 to 2016

Liv's third logo from 2016 to 2020
