= Jim (TV channel) =

Finnish national television channel

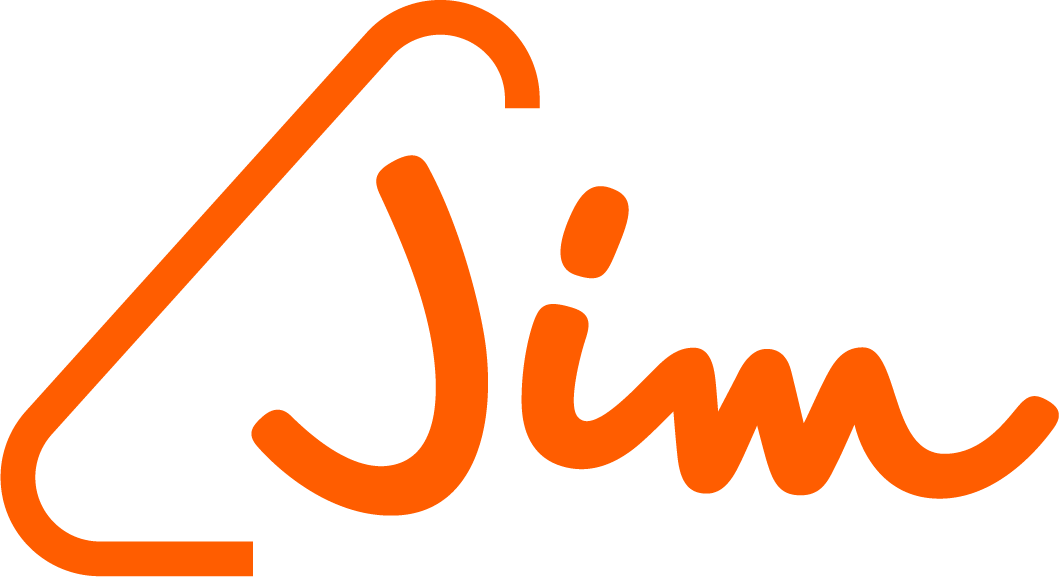
- Country: Finland
- Broadcast area: Finland

Ownership
- Owner: Sanoma Media Finland (Nelonen Media)
- Sister channels: Nelonen (HD); Liv; Hero

History
- Launched: 26 February 2007
- Replaced: Nelonen Plus (2003 - February 2007)

Links
- Website: www.jimtv.fi

Availability

Terrestrial
- Digital terrestrial: Channel 9 (HD); Channel 29

Jim (abbr. of Jotain ihan muuta, in English Something completely different) is a Finnish national television channel that replaced Nelonen Plus on 26 February 2007. Jim is part of Nelonen Media's media division, which is part of the Sanoma Group's Finnish media business division, Sanoma Media Finland.

The programming of the channel consists of imported programs: mainly do-it-yourself programs, documentaries and popular series such as Border Security: Australia, Border Security: Canada, Pawn Stars and American Pickers. Also, it features some lesser-known television series, such as Bondi Rescue, Ninja Warrior, Massive Moves and Hoarders.

== Logos and identities ==
Jim logo used from 2007 to 2012.

Jim logo used from 2013 to 2017.
