= Nelonen (TV channel) =

Finnish commercial TV channel

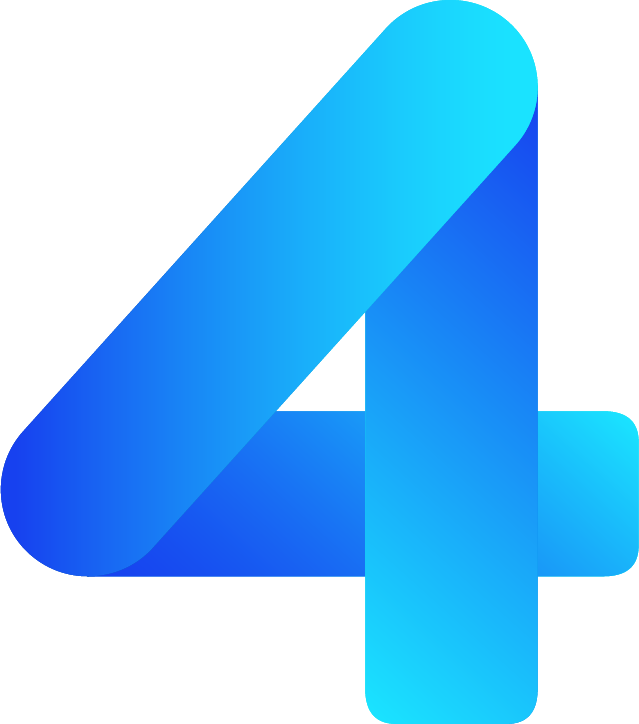
- Logo used since 2020
- Country: Finland
- Broadcast area: Finland
- Headquarters: Helsinki

Programming
- Picture format: 16:9 1080i (HDTV)

Ownership
- Owner: Sanoma Media Finland (Nelonen Media)
- Sister channels: Jim (HD); Liv (HD); Hero (HD)

History
- Launched: 1 June 1997; 29 years ago
- Former names: PTV (Paikallistelevisio); PTV4 (1990-1997)

Links
- Website: www.nelonen.fi

Availability

Terrestrial
- Digital terrestrial: Channel 4 (HD); Channel 24

Nelonen (Finnish for 'Number Four') is a Finnish commercial television channel. It started out as Helsinki's local television channel PTV in 1990 on the HTV cable network (now part of DNA), and changed its name first to PTV4. On June 1, 1997, the channel expanded to national coverage and changed its name to Nelonen, the Finnish name of the number four. Nelonen is mostly owned by Sanoma Corporation, which owns the Helsingin Sanomat and Ilta-Sanomat newspapers. Its largest owner was Aatos Erkko. Much of its programming is imported Australian, American, British, and European programs with Finnish captions. Its main market is the 25-44 demographic.

== Programming ==
=== Finnish series and shows ===
- Amazing Race Suomi
- Big Brother
- Extreme Duudsonit
- Haluatko miljonääriksi?
- Hauskat kotivideot
- Hyvät Herrat (reruns)
- Koskinen
- Mysteerilaulajat
- Reikä seinässä
- Selviytyjät Suomi
- Talent Suomi
- Team Ahma
- The Box Finland
- The Voice of Finland
- Vain elämää

=== Imported series, telenovelas and animated shows ===
- 33 Square Meters
- 90210
- Accidentally on Purpose
- Alias
- All in the Family
- American Chopper
- America's Got Talent
- America's Next Top Model
- Animatunes
- Au Pays Des Tetes A Claques
- Autogol Cartoon
- Avatar: The Last Airbender
- Bad Girls
- Basme Românești
- Battlestar Galactica
- Big Brother Australia (series 12 onwards)
- Big City Greens
- Big Love
- Blue Bloods
- BoBoiBoy
- Bob the Builder
- Brainiac: Science Abuse
- Breaking Bad
- Britain's Next Top Model
- Brotherhood
- Californication
- Calciatoons
- Camp Lazlo
- Canada's Next Top Model
- Cashmere Mafia
- Castle
- Charmed
- Commander in Chief
- Criminal Minds
- Constructor
- Cyborg 009
- Dawson's Creek
- Days of Our Lives
- Damages
- Deadwood
- Dennis the Menace
- Desperate Housewives
- Detroit 1-8-7
- Dexter
- Digimon (Digimon Adventure, Digimon Adventure 02, Digimon Tamers)
- Dirt
- Dirty Sexy Money
- Dr. Phil
- Drop Dead Diva
- DuckTales
- Early Edition
- Economic War
- Elementary
- El Club De Los Famosos
- Everybody Hates Chris
- Everybody Loves Raymond
- Extreme Makeover
- Fear Factor
- Felicity
- FlashForward
- Footballer's Wives
- Frasier
- FashionTelevision
- Ghost Whisperer
- GleepTV
- Greek
- Gravity Falls
- Grey's Anatomy
- Hanniibal
- Harper's Island
- Hawaii Five-0
- How to Get Away with Murder
- Inspector Rex
- Jericho
- Jerseylicious
- Judging Amy
- Jung Rhythm
- Kung Faux
- Kyle XY
- La Usurpadora
- Las Vegas
- LazyTown
- Less than Perfect
- Life as We Know It
- Little Einsteins
- Lost
- Mad Men
- Marcatoons 2D
- Marcatoons 3D
- Married... with Children
- MasterChef Australia
- Medical Investigation
- Medium
- Men Behaving Badly
- Mobobo Games
- Mult Lichnosti
- My Little Pony: Friendship Is Magic
- My Little Pony: Pony Life
- MythBusters
- Newlyweds: Nick and Jessica
- NCIS
- NCIS: Los Angeles
- Nurse Jackie
- Oggy and the Cockroaches
- Once Upon a Time
- OSP Comedy Quest
- OSP Studio
- Parobrod Srbija
- Phineas and Ferb
- Pimp My Ride
- Pranksterz: Off Your Boss
- Pranksterz: No Rest For The Wicked
- Pretty Little Liars
- Pochemuchka
- Punk'd
- Quantico
- Queer as Folk
- Relic Hunter
- Rescue Me
- Rome
- RSPCA Animal Rescue
- Robson Arms
- Saloon Gier
- Samantha Who?
- Santa Barbara
- Scrubs
- Secret Diary of a Call Girl
- Seinfeld
- Sex and the City
- South Park
- So You Think You Can Dance
- So You Think You Can Dance Canada
- Space: Above and Beyond
- Special Agent Oso
- Star vs. the Forces of Evil
- Starsky & Hutch
- Street Wars: Constructor Underworld
- Students from Hell: Alarm in the Hostel
- Sunset Beach
- Tetes A Claques
- Timesplitters
- Timesplitters 2
- Timesplitters: Future Perfect
- That '70s Show
- The 4400
- The Bachelor
- The Cleaner
- The Comeback
- The Cut
- The Emperor's New School
- The Game
- The Good Wife
- The King of Queens
- The Nanny
- The Office
- The Oprah Winfrey Show
- The Shield
- The Silver Brumby
- The Sopranos
- The Untouchables of Elliot Mouse
- The Voice
- The West Wing
- Threshold
- Total Wipeout
- Total Wipeout USA
- Trailer Park Boys
- Ugly Betty
- Under the Dome
- VeggieTales
- Wander Over Yonder
- Weeds
- What About Brian
- Wife Swap
- Wildfire
- Wizards of Waverly Place
- Yeralash
- Zapovednik

== Logos and identities ==
Former logo used from 2010-2014

Former logo used from 2014-2018

== Criticism ==
Nelonen was launched quickly and in an unprepared state. It has been criticized for importing "trash shows", especially during its first years. Mostly the subject of criticism have been related to its weekly imported "4D documentaries" concentrating on entertainment value and on highly emotive issues instead of artistic or other deeper values. The channel's entertainment output also consists of many other programmes which may be considered to be poor quality - imported game shows or Finnish versions of them (such as Reikä seinässä, a Finnish version of the Japanese 'Human Tetris' game) and reality TV shows dominate the scheduling. On the other hand, Nelonen's scheduling also contains several award-winning drama series.

== Controversy ==
During the fall of 2007, a day after the Jokela school shooting, Nelonen decided not to air a scheduled episode of the TV series Dexter. The TV series depicts a fictional serial killer Dexter Morgan and it was said to be inappropriate after such dramatic and nationwide turn of events. The episode was instead shown a week later.
