= List of newspapers in Finland =

As of 1946 most of the Finnish newspapers were affiliated with political parties. The number of national daily newspapers in Finland was 64 in 1950, whereas it was 56 in 1965. In 1990 there were 252 newspapers in the country. In 2008 the number was 197. It rose to 324 titles in 2012, but there was a decrease by 10% between 2006 and 2012.

Below is a list of newspapers in Finland with their respective cities of publication:

== Finnish-language newspapers ==
=== Morning newspapers ===
- Aamulehti (Tampere)
- Aamuposti (Riihimäki, Hyvinkää, Loppi, Hausjärvi)
- Demokraatti (Helsinki)
- Etelä-Saimaa (Lappeenranta)
- Etelä-Suomen Sanomat (Lahti)
- Hämeen Sanomat (Hämeenlinna)
- Helsingin Sanomat (Helsinki)
- IIkka (Seinäjoki)
- Itä-Häme (Heinola)
- Kainuun Sanomat (Kainuu)
- Kaleva (Oulu)
- Kansan Uutiset (Helsinki)
- Karjalainen (Joensuu)
- Kauppalehti (Helsinki)
- Keskipohjanmaa (Kokkola)
- Keskisuomalainen (Jyväskylä)
- Kouvolan Sanomat (Kouvola)
- Kymen Sanomat (Kotka)
- Länsi-Savo (Mikkeli)
- Länsi-Suomi (Rauma)
- Lapin Kansa (Rovaniemi)
- Päivän Sanomat (Helsinki)
- Pohjalainen (Vaasa)
- Salon Seudun Sanomat (Salo)
- Satakunnan Kansa (Pori)
- Savon Sanomat (Kuopio)
- Taloussanomat (Helsinki)
- Turun Sanomat (Turku)
- Uusimaa (Porvoo)

=== "Evening" newspapers (tabloid) ===
- Ilta-Sanomat (Helsinki), founded in 1932
- Iltalehti (Helsinki), founded in 1980

=== Regional newspapers ===
- Keskilaakso (Anjalankoski)
- Etelä-Saimaa (Lappeenranta)
- Etelä-Suomen Sanomat (Lahti)
- Hyvinkään Sanomat (Hyvinkää)
- Iisalmen Sanomat (Iisalmi)
- Itä-Savo (Savonlinna)
- Kainuun Sanomat (Kajaani)
- Karjalan Heili (Pohjois-Karjala)
- Karjalan Maa (Pohjois-Karjala)
- Kouvolan Sanomat (Kouvola)
- Länsi-Uusimaa (Lohja)
- HS Metro (Helsinki)
- Oulunsalo (Oulunsalo)
- Tyrvään Sanomat
- Uutislehti 100 (Helsinki; defunct)

== Swedish-language newspapers ==
- Åbo Underrättelser (Turku)
- Ålandstidningen (Mariehamn)
- Borgåbladet (Porvoo)
- Hufvudstadsbladet (Helsinki)
- Nya Åland (Mariehamn)
- Österbottens Tidning (Kokkola)
- Östra Nyland (Loviisa)
- Saima (Turku)
- Syd-Österbotten (Närpes)
- Vasabladet (Vaasa)
- Västra Nyland (Raseborg)
- Det Vita Finland (Vaasa)

== English-language newspapers ==
- Daily Finland www.dailyfinland.fi (Rovaniemi)
- Helsinki Times (Helsinki)
- News Now Finland www.newsnowfinland.fi
- Good News from Finland www.goodnewsfinland.fi

== Most valuable brands ==
Markkinointi & Mainonta business magazine and Taloustutkimus have researched the value of the newspapers' brands since 2007.

Most valuable newspaper brands in Finland as of 2009

- Aamulehti
- Etelä-Suomen Sanomat
- Helsingin Sanomat
- Hufvudstadsbladet
- Iltalehti
- Ilta-Sanomat
- Kaleva
- Karjalainen
- Kauppalehti
- Keskisuomalainen
- Maaseudun Tulevaisuus
- Savon Sanomat
- Taloussanomat
- Turun Sanomat

== See also ==
- List of Finnish magazines
- Mass media in Finland
