= Jouko Autero award =

Jouko Autero Award is a yearly award for the Best Finnish ice hockey reporter/journalist etc.

Winners:

- 1978 Antero Karapalo, Yle
- 1979 Jyrki Laelma, Uusi-Suomi
- 1980 Kaarlo Sundell, Helsingin Sanomat
- 1981 Timo Nyholm, Ilta-Sanomat
- 1982 Raimo Häyrinen, Yle
- 1983 Iltalehti sports
- 1984 Kaleva sports
- 1985 Turun Sanomat sports
- 1986 Timo Mustonen, Urheilutieto
- 1987 Pekka Wallenius, Länsi-Suomi
- 1988 Kari Tyni, Radio-Jyväskylä
- 1989 Reijo Suikki, Iltalehti
- 1990 TV3—Hockey Night team
- 1991 Helsingin Sanomat
- 1992 Ari Mennander, Jääkiekkolehti
- 1993 Timo Lainesalo, Hämeen Sanomat
- 1994 Juha-Pekka Jalo (aka: JP-Jalo), Auran Aallot
- 1995 YLE Radio Suomi
- 1996 Ilkka Ala-Kivimäki, Ilta-Sanomat
- 1997 Rauno Harju, Jääkiekkolehti
- 1998 Juha Alanen, Yle
- 1999 Tapani Salo, Aamulehti
- 2000 Hannu Kauhala, Kiekkolehti
- 2001 Jussi Heimo, Jääkiekkolehti
- 2002 MTV3—Hockey Night team (Timo Jutila, Jari Kurri & Mika Saukkonen)
- 2003 Jouko Vuorijoki, Kaleva
- 2004 YLE Sport's Kiekkokierros Team
- 2005 Göran Stubb, Hufvudstadsbladet
- 2006 - 2008 Prize not awarded
- 2009 Juho Pekka Mikola, Jääkiekkolehti
- 2010 Ilkka Kulmala, Keskisuomalainen
- 2011 Marko Leppänen, Länsi-Suomi
- 2012 Pasi Mennander, Leijonat
- 2013 Antti Mäkinen, Nelonen
- 2014 Satakunnan Kansa sports
- 2015 Mikko Pylkkö, Jatkoaika
- 2016 Marko Lempinen, Ilta-Sanomat
- 2017 Wesa Koistinen, Savon Sanomat
- 2018 Sami Hoffrén, Ilta-Sanomat
- 2019 Tuomas Nyholm, Telia
- 2020 Sasha Huttunen, Iltalehti
- 2021 Jani Alkio, Telia/C More
- 2022 Juha Lindgren, Tampereen Kiakkoradio
- 2023 Jussi Paasi, Yle
- 2024 Risto Leino, Radio Ramona, Rauma
- 2025 Ville Touru, Ilta-Sanomat
- 2026 Lauri Lehtinen, Aamulehti
