= Ilkka (company) =

Ilkka Oyj (formerly Ilkka-Yhtymä Oyj) is a Southern Ostrobothnian publishing house operating in Seinäjoki and Vaasa, Finland. It publishes two of the major regional newspapers Pohjalainen and Ilkka and seven local/town newspapers. The parent company Ilkka-Yhtymä ("Ilkka Group") owns the subsidiaries I-Mediat Oy, which publishes the newspapers, I-print Oy, which is their printing house and a property management company for their facilities. Additionally, Ilkka-Yhtymä owns substantial stock in Alma Media, Arena Partners, Väli-Suomen Media and Yrittävä Suupohja. Ilkka-Yhtymä also cooperates with other regional newspapers in producing national political news and features. Its shares are listed on the Helsinki Stock Exchange; among Finnish companies, it is considered a medium-sized company. The 2015 revenue was €41.2 million and the operating profit 9.0%, with 4.8% ROI. The Group had 299 personnel.

Previously, the two newspapers Pohjalainen and Ilkka were fierce competitors. However, in 1992, then-owner Aamulehti sold Pohjalainen to Ilkka. In 2009, Vaasa Oy, the publisher of Pohjalainen, was renamed I-Mediat Oy and Ilkka and other subsidiary newspapers were merged into it. There were 94 journalists and photographers working for the newspapers at the time of the merger.
