= Keskisuomalainen =

Finnish language newspaper

- Front page for 11 December 2008
- Type: Daily newspaper
- Format: Broadsheet
- Owner: Keskisuomalainen Oyj
- Publisher: Keskisuomalainen Oyj
- Editor: Pekka Mervola
- Founded: 1871; 155 years ago
- Political alignment: Centrist
- Language: Finnish
- Headquarters: Jyväskylä, Finland
- Circulation: 27,000 (2024)
- Sister newspapers: Savon Sanomat
- ISSN: 0356-1402
- Website: www.ksml.fi

Keskisuomalainen is a daily Finnish language newspaper published in Jyväskylä, serving central Finland (Keski-Suomi means Central Finland). Its parent company Keskisuomalainen Oyj owns nearly 80 newspapers.

== History and profile ==
Keskisuomalainen was first published on 7 January 1871 with the title Keski-Suomi, and is the oldest Finnish-language newspaper still in circulation. The current name was adopted in 1918. The paper has its headquarters in Jyväskylä. Keskisuomalainen is published in broadsheet format. The paper was the organ of the Centre Party until 1986 when it declared itself as "a newspaper in the centre".

The paper's parent company, Keskisuomalainen Oyj, has a virtual monopoly in newspaper publishing in central Finland. After April 2019 Keskisuomalainen owns nearly 80 different newspapers.

Acquisitions:

- 2001 Savon Mediat Oy; majority of shares in 2001, and rest in 2006
  - Savon Sanomat and some local papers
- 2013 Suomen Lehtiyhtymä
  - Aamuposti, Keski-Uusimaa, Helsingin Uutiset, Länsiväylä and Vantaan Sanomat
- 2016 Mediatalo ESA
  - Etelä-Suomen Sanomat ja Radio Voima.
- April 2019 Kaakon Viestintä and ESV-Paikallismediat Oy and printing house in Kouvola from Länsi-Savo -conglomerate.
  - Itä-Savo, Etelä-Saimaa, Kouvolan Sanomat, Kymen Sanomat ja Länsi-Savo and Uutisvuoksi.
  - 9 weekly newspapers: Juvan Lehti, Kaakonkulma, Kangasniemen Kunnallislehti, Keskilaakso, Luumäen Lehti, Länsi-Saimaan Sanomat, Paikallislehti Joutseno, Pitäjänuutiset and Puruvesi-lehti.

== Circulation ==
The circulation of Keskisuomalainen was 77,135 copies in 2001. In 2003 the paper had a circulation of 76,000 copies. The 2004 circulation of the paper was 76,816 copies and it was the fifth best-selling paper in the country. The same year the paper had a readership of 188,000. The paper had a circulation of 74,840 copies in 2006.

In January 2007 its circulation was 76,000 copies, making it the fifth highest circulation of daily Finnish papers, while the average number of readers climbed up to 130,000. The circulation of the paper was 74,945 copies in 2007. The paper had a circulation of 73,559 copies in 2008 and 71,777 copies in 2009. Its circulation was 68,880 copies in 2009 and 68,101 copies in 2010. It fell to 65,327 copies in 2012. The circulation of Keskisuomalainen was 61,163 copies in 2013.
