= Länsiväylä (newspaper) =

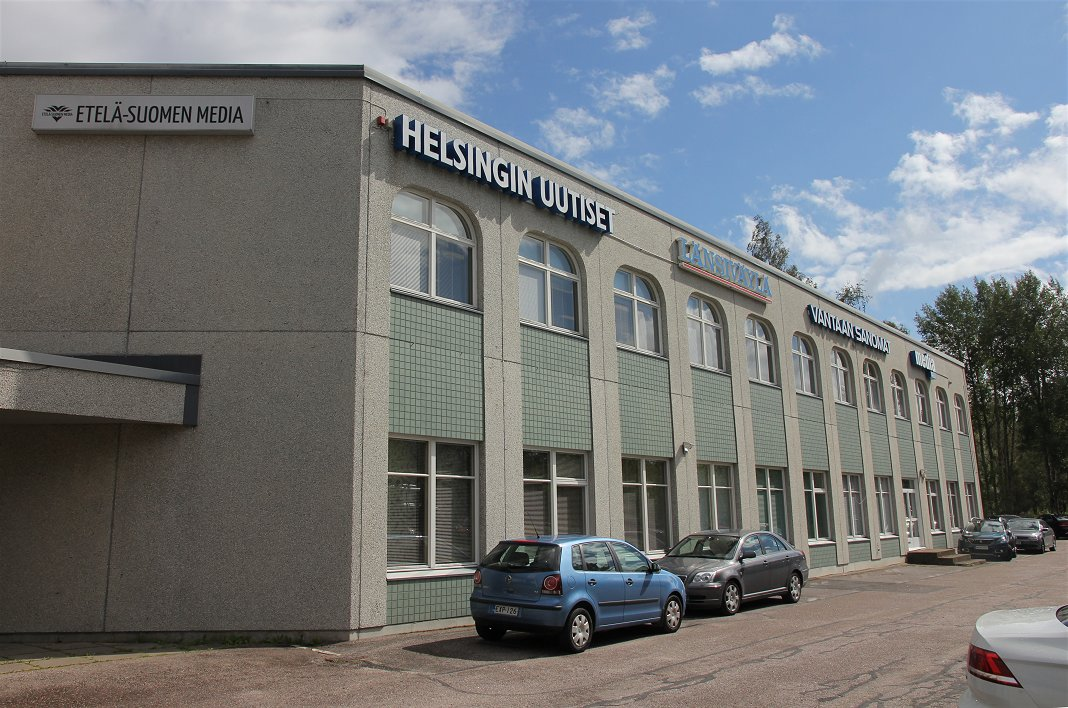
The office of Etelä-Suomen Media on Rälssitie 7 in Veromies, Vantaa. The office employs staff of various free newspapers including Helsingin Uutiset, Länsiväylä and Vantaan Sanomat.

Länsiväylä is a Finnish language free newspaper published twice a week in the cities of Espoo, Kauniainen and Kirkkonummi in southern Finland, on Wednesdays and weekends. The total readership of Länsiväylä numbers 136 thousand. The print newspaper has 121 thousand readers, the combined print and digital newspaper has nine thousand and the digital newspaper has 15 thousand.

Länsiväylä is published by Etelä-Suomen Media which is part of the Keskisuomalainen concern. The newspaper is printed at SLY-Lehtipainot. Sister magazines in the capital area include Helsingin Uutiset, Nurmijärven Uutiset and Vantaan Sanomat.

== History ==
The newspaper was founded by the Asuntosäätiö foundation in 1954. Its name at the time was Tapiola Tänään and its function was to serve as an information medium to the inhabitants of the newly founded district of Tapiola in Espoo. In January 1969 the newspaper was renamed Länsiväylä. In 2013 Länsiväylä was elected best newspaper in Finland by the "Free newspaper of the year" competition held by the Finnish Newspaper Association.

== Editors ==
- Uolevi Itkonen (1964-1996)
- Antti Soininen (1996-1998)
- Janne Kaijärvi (1998-2004)
- Eero Lehtinen (2006-2007)
- Risto Hietanen (2007-2008)
- Antti-Pekka Pietilä (2008-2017)
- Mikko Heino (2017-2020)
- Karri Kannala (acting) (2020-2021)
- Heli Koivuniemi (2021-)

== Sources ==
- Official site of Länsiväylä
- KMT Kuluttaja 2014
- Hatakka, Elina; Hellström, Mauritz; Marttinen, Markku (ed.): Länsiväylän villit vuodet. Länsiväylän tekijöiden muisteloita vuosilta 1969–1998. Tallinn 2015.
