= Jouko Innanen =

Finnish cartoonist (1952–2019)

Jouko Innanen (29 October 1952 in Ristiina – 1 October 2019 in Savonlinna) was a Finnish cartoonist, caricaturist and comics artist. Innanen's cartoons were published in the magazines Iltalehti, Turun Sanomat, Länsi-Savo, Itä-Savo and Länsiväylä.

== Bibliography ==
- Till . Espoo: Western Fairway, 1986. ISBN 951-99776-4-3
- Suominen Molli . Helsingfors: Ottawa, 1992. ISBN 951-1-12275-4
- Herr Kaaranen . Helsingfors: Automediat, 2010. ISBN 978-951-96508-5-2
