= Arvopaperi =

Finnish business magazine

- Editor-in-chief: Arno Ahosniemi
- Categories: Business magazine
- Frequency: Monthly
- Circulation: 24,944 (2011)
- Publisher: Suomen Arvopaperimediat Oy
- Founded: 1981; 45 years ago
- Company: Alma Talent; (Alma Media)
- Country: Finland
- Based in: Helsinki
- Language: Finnish
- Website: Arvopaperi
- ISSN: 0782-6060
- OCLC: 925090105

Arvopaperi (Finnish: Securities) is a Finnish-language monthly business magazine with a special reference to investment. The monthly is published in Helsinki, Finland, and has been in circulation since 1981.

== History and profile ==
Arvopaperi was founded by the Shareholders Association (Osakesäästäjien Keskusliitto) in 1981. The magazine is published on a monthly basis. Its publisher is Suomen Arvopaperimediat Oy which was acquired by Talentum Media Oy in 2004. Talentum Media Oy also publishes other business-oriented magazines, including Talouselämä and Tekniikka ja Talous. Arvopaperi, based in Helsinki, provides news on financial developments and investment. The magazine focuses on stocks and shares, and has a supplement, Arvoasunto, which is published twice per year.

Eljas Repo was both the editor-in-chief and the shareholder of the monthly.

In 2011 Arvopaperi had a circulation of 24,944 copies.

== See also ==
List of magazines in Finland
