= Uusi Suomi =

Daily newspaper in Finland, 1919–1991

- Type: Daily newspaper
- Format: Broadsheet
- Editor: Jarmo Virmavirta (1990–1991)
- Founded: 1919 (1847 as Suometar)
- Ceased publication: 29 November 1991
- Political alignment: Conservative
- Headquarters: Helsinki
- ISSN: 0355-5461

Uusi Suomi (lit. 'The New Finland') was a Finnish daily newspaper that was published from 1919 to 1991. The headquarters was in Helsinki, Finland. Uusi Suomi has been published as an online newspaper since 2007.

== History and Profile ==
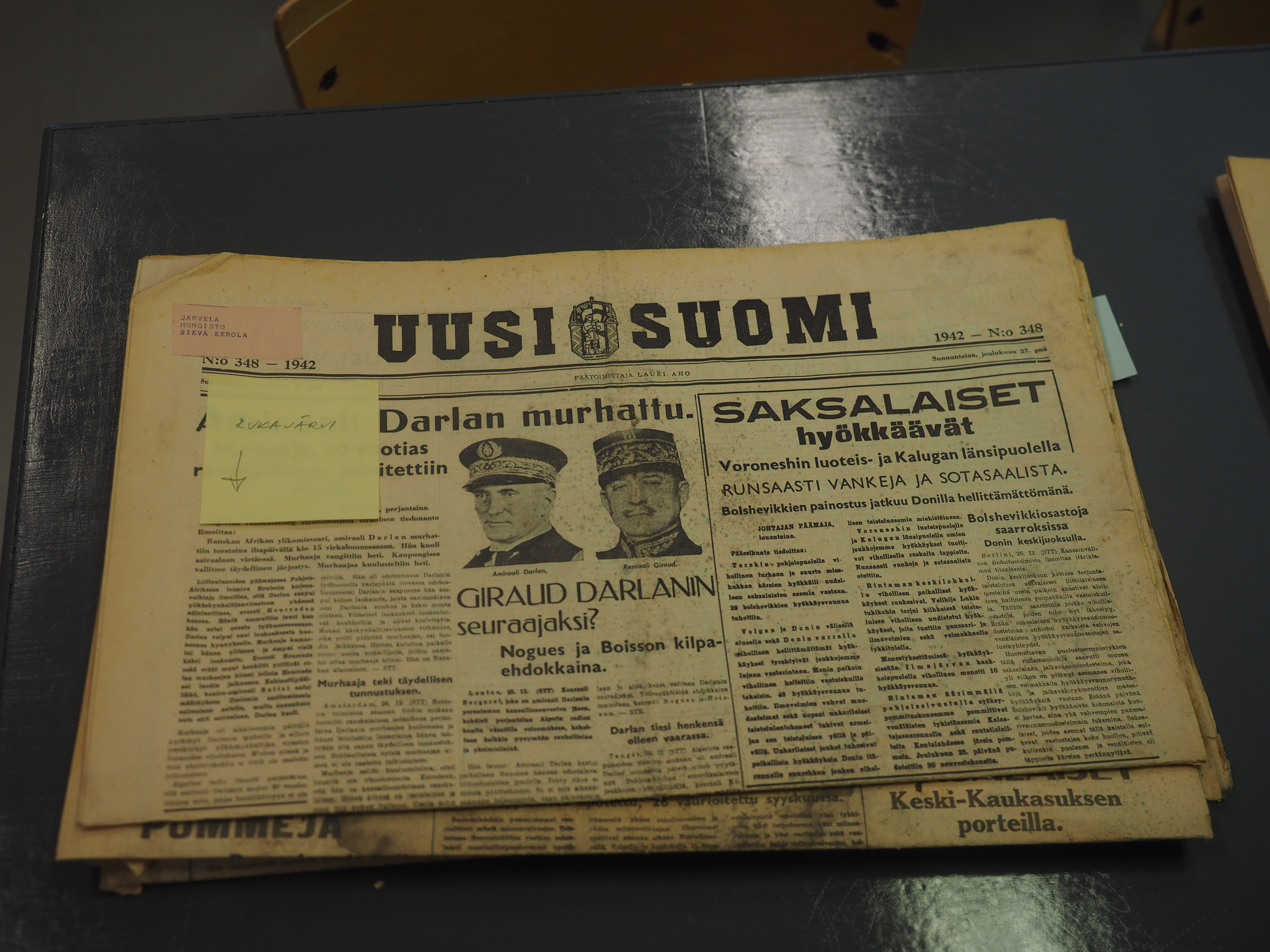
A preserved copy of an Uusi Suomi issue from 1942 at a museum in Lieksa, showing a front page news item about the murder of Admiral François Darlan.

Uusi Suomi was established in 1919 as a continuation of two earlier newspapers, Suometar (1847–1866) and Uusi Suometar (1869–1919). Suometar had been primarily concerned with pursuing issues relating to the Finnish population; its successor Uusi Suometar had represented closely related Fennoman views.

Two of its contributors, Linda Pylkkänen and Risto Sihtola, visited Italy in the late 1930s as guests of the Fascist government, and the paper was asked by the Italians to publish articles in favor of the Fascist rule. During the Cold War period Uusi Suomi was among the Finnish newspapers which were accused by the Soviet Union of being the instrument of US propaganda, and the Soviet embassy in Helsinki frequently protested the editors of the paper.

From its foundation in 1919 to 1976 Uusi Suomi was the official newspaper of the conservative Finnish National Coalition Party. It became editorially independent in 1976, keeping a conservative outlook.

In 1958 Uusi Suomi purchased the financial newspaper Kauppalehti.

Towards the end of the 1980s Uusi Suomi was acquired by the newspaper Aamulehti. However, the former was struggling with financial difficulties, ultimately leading to its demise.

Uusi Suomi was published in broadsheet format. The paper was owned by the Alma Media which acquired it in 1991.

The last issue of Uusi Suomi was published on 29 November 1991. The Finnish tabloid Iltalehti, which can be considered Uusi Suomi's spiritual successor, began publication in 1980 as the afternoon edition of Uusi Suomi.

== Present Day ==
On 25 May 2007 it was announced that the Finnish company Nikotiimi had purchased the rights to the title Uusi Suomi from Alma Media. It started an online newspaper bearing that title in the fall of 2007. In 2010, it was the twenty-seventh most visited website in Finland, being visited by 204,722 people per week.

== Editors-in-chief ==
- 1919 – 1921: A. H. Virkkunen
- 1921 – 1922: E. Nevanlinna
- 1922 – 1932: Kaarlo Koskimies
- 1932 – 1940: S. J. Pentti
- 1940 – 1956: Lauri Aho
- 1956 – 1965: Eero Petäjäniemi
- 1965 – 1967: Eero Petäjäniemi and Pentti Poukka
- 1967 – 1976: Pentti Poukka
- 1976 – 1989: Johannes Koroma
- 1989 – 1990: Ari Valjakka
- 1990 – 1991: Jarmo Virmavirta
