= Helmi Järviluoma =

Helmi Järviluoma-Mäkelä (born 1960 in Ylivieska, North Ostrobothnia) is a Finnish scholar of sound, music, and culture, as well as a writer. She is a professor of cultural studies at the University of Eastern Finland. As sensory and soundscape ethnographer, Järviluoma has developed the mobile method of sensobiographic walking. Her research and artistic work span the fields of sensory memory, qualitative methodology (with a particular focus on gender), environmental cultural studies, sound art, and fiction writing. Järviluoma was married to Finnish writer Matti Mäkelä (1951–2019).

== Early life and career ==
Helmi Inkeri Järviluoma was born in 1960 and attended high school in Ylivieska. She earned her bachelor's degree in 1982 and her master's degree in 1986 from the University of Tampere, specializing in folk tradition—particularly folk music—with a strong emphasis on sociology. She continued her studies in ethnomusicology and completed her Ph.D. at the University of Tampere in 1997.

Järviluoma joined the Department of Folk Tradition (later known as the Department of Music Anthropology) in 1986, and by 1992 she was appointed a Research Fellow. Between 1991 and 1992, she also served as the first director of the Institute of Rhythm Music in Seinäjoki, which focused on popular music.

From 1998 to 2005, she was affiliated with the University of Turku as a Senior Assistant and Lecturer in ethnomusicology. During this period, she also held positions at the Academy of Finland, first as a Postdoctoral Research Fellow (1998–2001) and later as an Academy Research Fellow (2004–2006). She concluded the latter position in autumn 2005 upon her appointment as Professor of Cultural Studies at the University of Joensuu (now the University of Eastern Finland).

In 2016, Järviluoma received an Advanced Grant of approximately €1.9 million from the European Research Council (ERC) for the project Sensory Transformations and Transgenerational Environmental Relationships, 1950–2020 (SENSOTRA). The project focused on sensory experiences and environmental memory in three European cities: Ljubljana, Turku, and Brighton.

== From music and soundscape research towards the study of sensory transformations ==
Järviluoma is best known for her work in the field of soundscape studies. Decades of research culminated in the publication of Acoustic Environments in Change (2009), produced in collaboration with Simon Fraser University. The publication summarizes four consecutive interdisciplinary and international soundscape research projects focused on the changing soundscapes of Europe.

Her current research centers on sensobiographies, as well as themes related to mobilities, aging, memory, technology, and displacement. Among her 180 publications, Gender and Qualitative Methods (2003/2010) continues to receive scholarly attention.

Järviluoma has also written and directed six radio features for the Finnish Broadcasting Company (YLE)—three independently, two in collaboration with Steven Feld, and one with Noora Vikman.

== Distinctions and awards ==
- In 2019, the Finnish Union of University Professors named Helmi Järviluoma the Professor of the Year in Finland.
- She was elected as a member of the Finnish Academy of Science and Letters in 2018.
- In 2013, she received the Equality and Diversity Award from the University of Eastern Finland.
- In 2006, the Aesthetic Act of the Year award was granted by the Finnish Society for Aesthetics to the project One Hundred Finnish Soundscapes, which was directed by Järviluoma.

== Selected works ==
Järviluoma's publications include the results of major interdisciplinary projects, such as Acoustic Environments in Change (2009), and the widely cited Gender and Qualitative Methods (Sage, 2003/2010). Between 2005 and 2017, she also wrote and directed several radio features that combined art and research for the Finnish Broadcasting Company's Radioateljee. In 2016, she published a short story collection titled Ja katsella hain hampaita (And to Watch Sharks' Teeth).

As a fiddler, she has performed with several ensembles, including the Balkan music orchestra Slobo Horo (1986–1989), the women's rock band Enkelimankeli (1992–1998), and the folk group Säilyn pelimannit (2016–present).

=== Selected publications ===
- Järviluoma, Helmi. Aspects of "Dis-placement" and Ageing – A Case Study in Musical Remembering.
- Järviluoma, Helmi. The Art and Science of Sensory Memory Walking, in Marcel Cobussen, Vincent Meelberg & Barry Truax (eds.).
- Järviluoma, Helmi; Uimonen, Heikki; Vikman, Noora; Kytö, Meri; Truax, Barry. Acoustic Environments in Change.
- Järviluoma, Helmi; Moisala, Pirkko; Vilkko, Anni. Gender and Qualitative Methods (Sage, 2003/2010).
- Järviluoma, Helmi; Wagstaff, Gregg (eds.). Soundscape Studies and Methods.
- Järviluoma, Helmi. From Manchuria to the Tradition Village: On the Construction of Place via 'Pelimanni' Music.
- Järviluoma, Helmi. Local Constructions of Gender in a Finnish Pelimanni Musicians Group.
- Järviluoma, Helmi. Musiikki, identiteetti ja ruohonjuuritaso. Amatöörimuusikkoryhmän kategoria-työskentelyn analyysi [Music and Identity at Grassroots Level: Analyzing the Category-Work of an Amateur Music Group].
- Schafer, R. Murray; Järviluoma, Helmi (eds.). Yearbook of Soundscape Studies, Vol. 1: Northern Soundscapes.
- Järviluoma, Helmi (ed.). Soundscapes: Essays on Vroom and Moo.
- Suutari, Pekka; Järviluoma, Helmi. Finlandization and the Restriction of Karelian Voices at the Height of the Cold War.
- Järviluoma, Helmi; Vikman, Noora. On Soundscape Methods and Audiovisual Sensibility, in Claudia Gorbman, John Richardson & Carol Vernallis (eds.).
- Järviluoma, Helmi; Leppänen, Taru. Becoming Audible! Asylum Seekers, Participatory Action Research and Cultural Encounters, in Situating Popular Musics.
- Järviluoma, Helmi; Mäki-Kulmala, Airi. Folk Music and Political Song Movements in Finland – Remarks on "Symbolic Home-coming".

== News ==
- Professor Helmi Järviluoma-Mäkelä receives Professor of the Year Award.
- A Jackpot! Almost €1.9 Million Grant for a Researcher at the University of Eastern Finland, Karjalainen, 15 April 2016.
- ERC Funds Unprecedented Amount of Research in Finland, The Finnish Union of University Researchers and Teachers, 1 July 2016.
- Does a Teenager Born Directly into the Digital World Sense the Environment Differently Than One Born Before It? The issue is explored in a €2 million grant project, Helsingin Sanomat, 2 December 2016.
- Helmi Järviluoma-Mäkelä: The Soundscape is a Tourist Attraction for Finland, 29 January 2017.
- Generations Live Inside Their Own Bubbles – Does Culture Move from One Generation to Another?, Karjalainen, 27 September 2018.
