= Presso =

Finnish business magazine (2004–2007)

- Categories: Business magazine
- Frequency: Weekly
- Publisher: Alma Media
- First issue: October 2004
- Final issue: November 2007
- Company: Alma Media
- Country: Finland
- Based in: Helsinki
- Language: Finnish

Presso was a Finnish language weekly business magazine published in Helsinki, Finland, between October 2004 and November 2007.

== History and profile ==
Presso was started as a Saturday supplement of the daily Kauppalehti. In October 2004 it became a weekly published on Saturdays.

The publisher and owner of Presso was Alma Media. It was based in Helsinki and served the Greater Helsinki area. The magazine was published in a half Nordic format.

Presso was named as the Best Designed Publication and was given the 2005 European Newspaper Award in the category of weekly publications.

The 2005 circulation of Presso was 50,000 copies.

The magazine ceased publication in November 2007.

== See also ==
- List of magazines in Finland
