= Saukkonen =

Saukkonen is a Finnish surname.

== Geographical distribution ==
As of 2014, 91.3% of all known bearers of the surname Saukkonen were residents of Finland, 3.9% of Russia, 1.9% of Sweden and 1.4% of Estonia.

In Finland, the frequency of the surname was higher than national average in the following regions:

1. North Karelia (1:614)
2. South Karelia (1:760)
3. Southern Savonia (1:1,362)
4. Northern Savonia (1:2,000)
5. Northern Ostrobothnia (1:2,387)
6. Uusimaa (1:2,969)

== People ==
Notable people with the surname include:

- Jussi Saukkonen, Finnish politician
- Mika Saukkonen, Finnish ice hockey journalist
- Tuomas Saukkonen, Finnish singer
