= Innanen =

Innanen is a Finnish surname. Notable prople with the surname include:

- Jack Innanen (born 1999), Canadian comedian and actor
- Jouko Innanen (1952–2019), Finnish cartoonist, caricaturist and comics artist
- Kimmo Innanen (1937–2011), Canadian astrophysicist
- Mikko Innanen (footballer) (born 1982), Finnish football coach and former midfielder
- Mikko Innanen (musician) (born 1978), Finnish saxophonist and composer

== See also ==
- 3497 Innanen, a main-belt asteroid
