= Helsingin Uutiset =

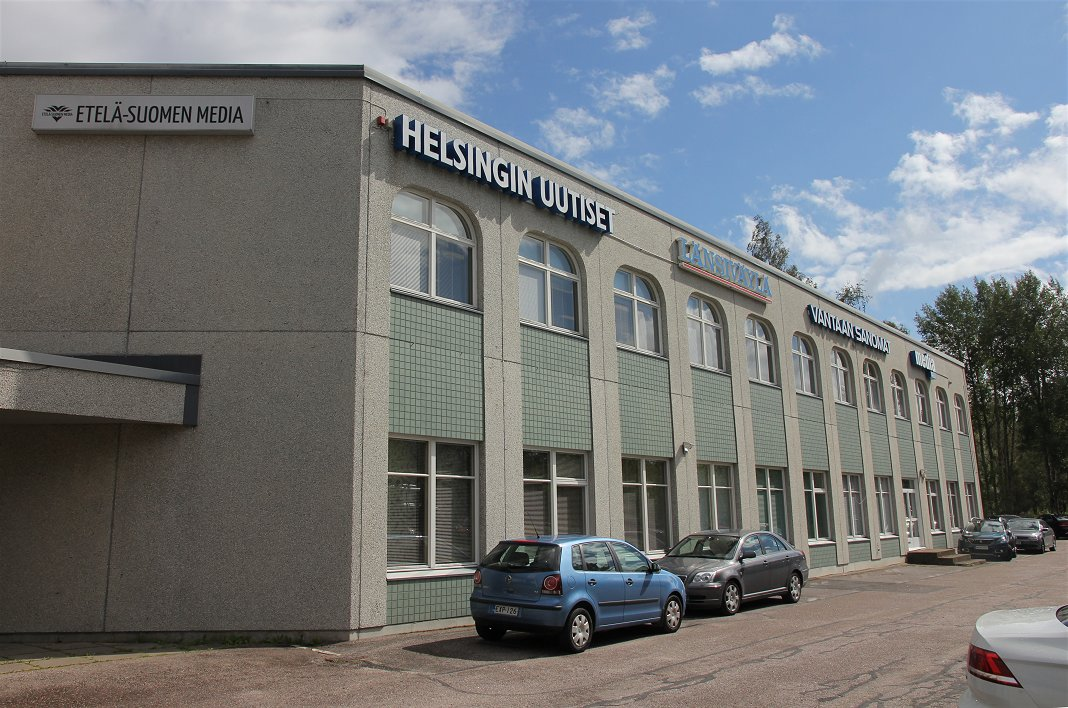
The office of Etelä-Suomen Media at Rälssitie 7 in Veromies, Vantaa.

Helsingin Uutiset (lit. 'News from Helsinki') is a free newspaper that has been published in Helsinki, Finland since the early 2020 as six different local editions twice a week, on Wednesdays and weekends. The newspaper has a total of 350 thousand readers.

Since summer 2019 the editor of Helsingin Uutiset has been Karri Kannala, who has also worked as a local leader of Etelä-Suomen Media. Previous editors have included Antti-Pekka Pietilä from 2008 to 2014 and Sakari Nupponen from 2014 to 2017. Mikko Heino served as editor from 2017 to 2019.

The office of Helsingin Uutiset was located in Veromies in Vantaa, but moved to Tikkurila in Vantaa in spring 2020. At the same time the newspaper got a branch office in Helsinki.

Helsingin Uutiset is published by Etelä-Suomen Media, which is part of the Keskisuomalainen concern. The newspaper is printed at Lehtisepät Oy in Tuusula. Sister newspapers in the capital area include Länsiväylä, Nurmijärven Uutiset and Vantaan Sanomat.

== History ==
The newspaper has a complex history. The current form of the newspaper was first published in January 2003, when Itä-Helsingin Uutiset merged with MaTaPuPu which was first published in September 1981. The newspaper Alueuutiset became a weekly supplement of Helsingin Uutiset in 2005, until it was fully merged into Helsingin Uutiset in 2006.

The online readership of Helsingin Uutiset has grown greatly in the 2010s and it is now part of the ten most-read news media in Finland.

The paper newspaper originally had four local editions, until they were decreased to three and then to two. During Karri Kannala's period as editor the direction changed and the newspaper announced in November 2019 that it would return to local editions, of which there have been six since early 2020: east, northeast, southeast, central, west and downtown. At the same time the newspaper focuses on locality via news and topic journalism. Helsingin Uutiset is the largest free newspaper in Finland in terms of number of readers.
