= Lojer =

Finnish medical technology company

Lojer Oy
- Predecessor: Vammalan Konepaja Oy
- Founded: 1919
- Founder: Niilo Ranni
- Headquarters: Sastamala, Finland
- Area served: Global markets
- Products: Hospital beds Operating tables Surgical lighting Medical furniture
- Brands: Lojer, Merivaara
- Revenue: €64 million (2024)
- Number of employees: 260
- Subsidiaries: Merivaara Oy; Medema Physio Ab; Fysiopartner As
- Website: www.lojer.com

Lojer Oy is a privately owned Finnish medical technology company established in 1919. Lojer's headquarters are in Sastamala, Finland. In 2023 company employed 260 people in three countries, and reported annual revenues €64 million.

== Beginnings after the civil war ==
Niilo Ranni founded Vammalan Konepaja in 1919. Prior to this Ranni worked for a local engineer named Lindström in Vammala. Ranni developed production methods for Lindström, such as for the manufacture of weights for scales. Ranni was a metal worker who had no formal qualifications, but started his own workshop nonetheless. His workshop reflected some of the needs in post-war Finland: many skills and services were needed, and Vammalan Konepaja did its best to fulfil them. The company grew, and only three years later in 1922 Ranni decided to buy his own premises, complete with residence, in the centre of Vammala.

In 1923 an iron foundry was established to work alongside the machine shop and woodworking departments. With it came a new line of business, agricultural machinery, which was much needed in post-war Finland. Under Niilo Ranni's skilled leadership and product development Vammalan Konepaja manufactured all manner of useful machines, such as machines for transporting grain, NIRA stone grinding machines, woodworking machines and NIRA chaffcutters. The early years were not without their problems for Vammalan Konepaja, as local newspaper Tyrvään Sanomat reported in 1927: “This day dawned under unfortunate circumstances in Vammala. At around 6 o’clock flames began to blaze in N. Ranni’s machine workshop. According to what we hear, insurance cover was totally inadequate. So Ranni is facing damages rising into the hundreds and thousands.”

== Concentrating on agricultural machinery and pumps in the 1930s ==
Vammalan Konepaja's own foundry made it possible for the company to develop new cast iron products, from design right through to the finished product. The foundry helped Vammalan Konepaja make its mark on Finnish sporting history in the 1930s. In 1934 a contract was made between the Finnish Athletics Federation and Vammalan Konepaja, under which Vammalan Konepaja started to make the shot puts used by both men and women in competitions. The contract allowed the Federation's trademark to be cast in the shot puts. The contract was signed on behalf of Vammalan Konepaja by entrepreneur Niilo Ranni; signing on behalf of the Athletics Federation was its then chairman, Urho Kekkonen, who would go on to become Finland's eighth president.

The manufacture of pumps for domestic wells also began in 1934. These pumps proved to be a much more important and innovative product for the company than shot puts, and served to make the company famous for decades to follow. There was much need for NIRA hand pumps after the Continuation War; farms were created in northern and eastern Finland for evacuees from Karjala, and these new farms needed water supplies.

In the 1930s and 1940s Vammalan Konepaja concentrated on developing and manufacturing machines needed in the home and in agriculture. When the company turned 40 in 1959, local newspaper Tyrvään Sanomat wrote about the diversity of know-how in the company: ”The company has expanded its range to include products such as tractor-drawn harrows and rollers. The range of woodworking tools has also been expanded and existing models improved, stone grinding machines have also been revamped and new types designed.”

== The armoury moves to Vammala ==
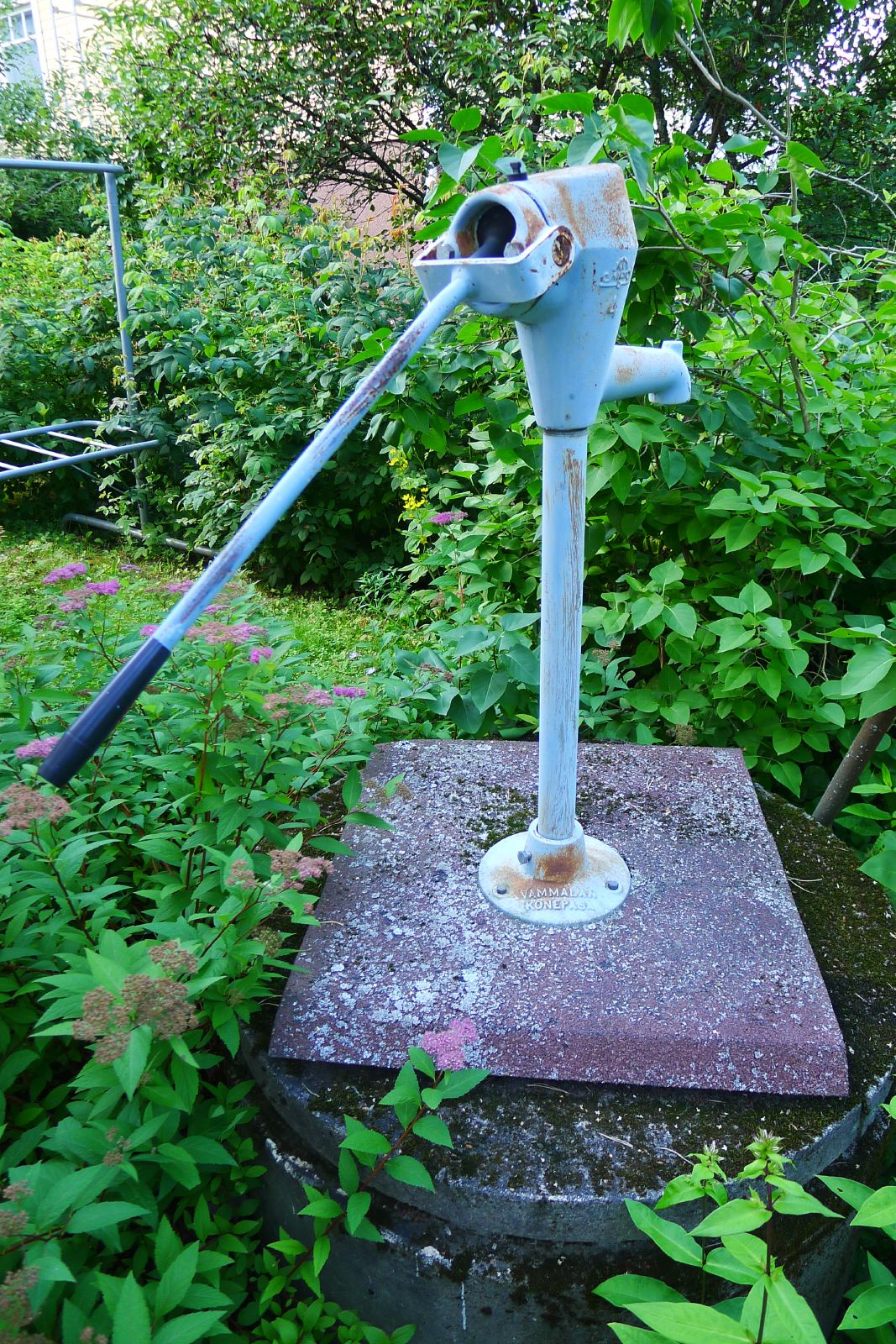
Vammalan Konepaja / Nira pump in a garden Finland.

In the late 1930s and the 1940s the Winter War and the Continuation War also affected Vammalan Konepaja's activities. The company had been trading for twenty years when, on the eve of the Winter War, the armoury was moved from the capital to Vammala. Weapons workshop 1 took up residence in Vammalan Konepaja's premises on 3.11.1939. At first, the armoury's role was to prepare M91 rifles and to fix M09 machine guns. Later, the armoury worked with Vammalan Konepaja to make parts for machine gun locks and pistols. It has been estimated that around half the artillery shells fired during the last wars were made in the Vammala armoury. After the wars Konepaja took part in war reparations by manufacturing a variety of machine parts. It was also around this time, in 1943, that the company became a limited company.

Niilo Ranni ran Vammalan Konepaja for over 30 years, developing new products and production methods to meet the needs of the times. He died in 1953, and his wife Anna Ranni stepped into the role of leading the company. A woman in a position of leadership in a company was very rare in the 1950s. A few years later Anna Ranni married Urho Kaunisto, who then took over as managing director of Vammalan Konepaja. Although things became more difficult for the company after Niilo Ranni's death, Urho Kaunisto managed to lead the company well after the initial setbacks. Tyrvään Sanomat wrote in 1969: ”In the past years the company has begun production of different types of equipment for working the ground, existing models have been developed and improved. Vammalan Konepaja also specialises in manufacturing pumps. In fact, they are the company’s main product. In the last 10 years the factory’s production has increased around threefold.”

At the end of the 1950s Vammalan Konepaja was expanding and needed another building in the centre of Vammala. The council did not grant planning permission for another building; the expansion was therefore moved to neighbouring Kiikka, where an iron foundry and aluminium foundry were set up under the name Kiikan Metalli Oy in 1962.

The company's best-selling product, the pressure pump, and the aluminium bodied NIRA 6 pump began to be exported to other countries. In the late 1960s Vammalan Konepaja exhibited its products at trade fairs in Stockholm and Oslo. The NIRA pressure pump was a new kind of product on both the Swedish and Norwegian markets. Marketed as the ’Hyttepumppe’, the NIRA 6 pump sold particularly well in the mountainous regions of Norway in the years following the trade fair. At home in Finland the NIRA 6 can be found in service as a water pump in many waterfront saunas. It is also commonly used for other applications, such as oil pumps on farms and for pumping fuel for forest machines.

There has also been much demand for Vammalan Konepaja's water pumps in Africa. With the help of development aid, the company developed a village water pump and started to export it to Africa, beginning with Tanzania in 1976. The company was introduced to the African market by a Ministry of Foreign Affairs development programme to provide wells. Vammalan Konepaja worked together with YIT, and the support of the large company gave Konepaja valuable experience. Vammalan Konepaja's water pumps were featured in a pump manual published by the UN, which also helped increase export sales.

Finland's internationalisation and participation in international projects began in earnest in the 1980s with co-operative development aid work. Vammalan Konepaja played a significant role in this development. The company made and supplied pumps for wells to a number of development areas in the ’70s and ’80s.

The NIRA AF-85 hand-operated pump was a test-winner in the World Bank's field and laboratory tests, a testimony to the company's successful product development. The pump was developed especially for women to use, and as such it was lighter and easier to use and service than its competitors. In the early 1990s the pumps were also produced for local use in Tanzania and Ghana.

== Towards wellness and medical equipment manufacturing ==
At the end of the 1970s Vammalan Konepaja's expertise spread to the wellness and medical supply sector. Caring for pensioners in their homes started to be more of a priority, and Vammalan Konepaja's designer used his own experiences to design a mechanical device for lifting patients. This piece of equipment was displayed at trade shows and it became very popular. In 1979 Vammalan Konepaja invited engineer and economist Seppo Suuriniemi to lead the company. Prior to this, Suuriniemi had been in management and marketing at ventilation and air conditioning manufacturer Suomen Puhallintehdas Oy, the predecessor to today's Fläkt Woods Oy. His first job in charge at Vammalan Konepaja was to accept an order from the Soviet Union for 100 patient lifting devices. The size of this order presented a challenge for Vammalan Konepaja, but the order was successfully completed and the equipment delivered to the customer. The company's journey to specialising in medical and wellness equipment had begun.

In the early 1980s Vammalan Konepaja made its first treatment table. MD Seppo Suuriniemi's wife ran a physical therapy clinic in Tampere, and another branch was opened in Vammala. Vammalan Konepaja designed new treatment tables to meet her needs. The products also complemented Instrumentarium's product range, and Konepaja signed a deal with them to sell and export the company's treatment tables. In the early 1980s Vammalan Konepaja also started working together with Swedish operating table manufacturer Stille Ab. Their first joint venture was to design a new lift for operating theatres. Soon Konepaja started to make operating table accessories for Stille, as well as the Stille 1100 hydraulic operating table. As a result of fruitful co-operation, the manufacture of the advanced electro-hydraulic Scandia operating table was moved to Vammalan Konepaja in the late 1980s. After Stille sold the design to German company Berchtold Gmbh, the operating tables continued to be made in Vammala. The largest single order to come out of the co-operation with Stille was the export of 147 operating tables to Thailand. Vammalan Konepaja received widespread recognition in the field of physiatrics when the Swedish Olympic team made the decision to use the company's treatment and massage tables at the Calgary Olympics in 1988.

== Aid to Africa ==
Although the seeds of Konepaja's involvement in development aid work were sown using development funds, the company continued independent efforts to supply pumps for wells to developing countries. In the 1980s and 1990s, MD Seppo Suuriniemi took part in numerous conferences in Africa to tackle the problem of providing clean drinking water. The development of water pumps also continued, and new versions that were better suited to African conditions, and particularly models that were easier for African women to use, were designed. Vammalan Konepaja's trade with the developing world was significant; in 1991 around a quarter of the company's turnover came from developing countries. In the early 1990s Konepaja's pumps were improving water supplies in places including Kenya, Tanzania and Sri Lanka. Vammalan Konepaja also exported pump manufacturing know-how to Africa; pumps began to be assembled in Tanzania and Ghana for the local markets in the 1990s, although parts for the pumps were still manufactured in Vammala. The first factory in Tanzania proved itself, which encouraged the company to set up a second factory in Ghana in 1994. The pumps received praise locally: ”According to tests carried out by the World Bank, these pumps are extremely well suited to African conditions.” Considering the conditions in Africa, the pumps received acclaim for ease of use, ease of servicing and durability. Establishing a manufacturing facility in Africa was not without its challenges. For the Tanzanian factory, for example, the Tanzanian customs created problems – changes in VAT practices meant that one container at a time was held up in customs.

”Then there have been smaller setbacks, such as the state bank running out of money and having to wait for payments. By the way, our share of Finnish exports to Tanzania is around three per cent; quite an achievement for a medium-sized machine shop. And of course the most important result is that around five million people pump their daily water with our pumps.", says mr Suuriniemi. In 2003 President Tarja Halonen visited Tanzania. In addition to her official engagements she also visited Vammalan Konepaja's Tanira water pump factory in the capital, Dar es Salaam. Halonen was pleased with what she saw: ”People are always wondering how we can get companies to invest in the poorest countries, the really poor countries,” she said. ”Everyone knows that there isn’t a great rush to invest in them. Vammalan Konepaja’s pump factory is a good example of a company that continued its work in Tanzania, even after the government aid they received had finished.”

== Growth through acquisitions ==
During the 1980s Vammalan Konepaja's expertise and know-how was becoming increasingly focussed on the field of medical equipment. The company philosophy was to manufacture the products in-house from start to finish, and for this the company was well equipped. With its own iron and aluminium foundry and much investment in equipment and processes, the company was able to keep developing and keep production in-house. In the early ’80s major investments were made in electromechanics, CNC technology, automated welding, powder coating facilities, and management and design processes. Computers became an integral part of the design process: a CAD design system was introduced already at the beginning of the ’80s, at around the same time as the new manufacturing facility was built in its current location in Vammala.

In 1989 Vammalan Konepaja bought the rights to manufacture and market hospital beds from Muurame-based company Lojer Oy. Almost overnight the Muurame factory's manufacturing was moved to Vammala. According to MD Seppo Suuriniemi, at that time the company was able to take on the manufacturing of around 1000 hospital beds at a time. The company had 55 employees at the time, and its turnover was around 20 million FIM. In the early 1990s hospital beds were exported to places such as Scandinavia, central Europe and Israel.

During the 1990s Vammalan Konepaja invested heavily in product development and incorporating new production methods. The company was the first hospital equipment manufacturer in Finland to receive ISO9001 quality certification. Vammalan Konepaja's management also received recognition when, in 1998, long time managing director Seppo Suuriniemi was chosen by Tampere Chamber of Commerce as company director of the year.

In 1995 the company expanded its line of hospital equipment with the purchase of Kempele-based Temelex Oy. New premises were acquired for the expansion, and the manufacture of components that Temelex had previously subcontracted were brought in-house, requiring further investment in equipment, painting facilities and welding robots. In 2003 a new assembly plant, with around 600 m2 of workspace, was built in Kempele. Temelex concentrates on designing and manufacturing hospital beds.

In 1999 the company expanded its business in the field of physiotherapy by purchasing Medema Physio Ab, a Swedish physiotherapy equipment wholesaler. In 2004 Vammalan Konepaja expanded into massage tables and associated equipment by acquiring Orimattila-based company Rainer Rajala Oy. Subsequent business rationalisation has seen Rainer Rajala Oy concentrate on upholstering treatment tables, and it also acts as a logistics centre for domestic, Swedish and Russian sales. Co-ordination in the physiotherapy field between Medema Physio and Rainer Rajala has resulted in an extended Scandinavian product catalogue, and increased the availability of products in Finland.

In 2009 Lojer opens a representative office in Moscow, Russia. Lojer Russia focuses in marketing and distribution channel development in Russia and CIS countries. In 2013 Lojer streamlinines its business structure by incorporating Lojer Works Oy, Rainer Rajala Oy and Temelex Oy into Lojer Oy's business. At the same time Lojer is separating its healthcare and pump business activities, and each company will now be separately developed as its own entity.

In 2019 Lojer Oy acquired Lahti-based healthcare technology company Merivaara Oy’s hospital bed business operations. The agreed deal included Merivaara’s hospital and examination beds, stretchers and birthing beds. 28 Merivaara's employees moved to Lojer in Finland and Norway, and Lojer moved the production from Lahti to Hollola, Finland.

== Lojer streamlines its business structure ==
Lojer Oy streamlined its business structure 2013 by incorporating Lojer Works Oy, Rainer Rajala Oy and Temelex Oy into Lojer Oy's business. At the same time Lojer separated its healthcare and pump business activities. From 2013 onwards the newly structured company consists of parent company Lojer Oy and sales subsidiaries Medema Physio Ab in Sweden and Lojer Russia in Russia. Nira Pumps Oy has a subsidiary in Tanzania, Tanira Ltd.

In 2015 Lojer established a new subsidiary ooo Lojer Medical in Moscow, Russia. In the autumn 2015 Lojer purchased the entire share capital of Norwegian Fysiopartner As. Fysiopartner is a retailer of physiotherapy and fitness equipment in Norway.

== Exports on the rise - with Russia leading the way ==
Lojer's eastern trade began seriously 2009, when a representative office was established in Russia. The product offering was adapted at the same time to better suit the Russian needs and market. Lojer's Russian sales increased fivefold over the next five years, and Russia grew to become the company's biggest export market. In 2015 Lojer started its own limited company in Russia.

Significant contracts included the sale of electrically operated hospital equipment and medical furniture to six hospitals in the city of Moscow, the supply of furniture and equipment to the Russian Finnish Clinic Scandinavia private hospital in St. Petersburg, and the supply of beds and other hospital equipment to the Central Clinical Hospital of the Presidential Administration of the Russian Federation, also known as the Kremlin Clinic. Before the Sochi Olympics, the Russian Olympic team were supplied with Lojer FX massage tables, which were installed in bus-based mobile wellness centres.

The export of Lojer's products continued around the world. In 2012 operating tables were delivered to the Örebro hospital in Sweden, and in 2016 Lojer won an international tender to supply beds for the new Karolinska Hospital in Stockholm. Products have been exported as far as Chile, Saudi Arabia, South Korea, South Africa, Peru, Taiwan, Thailand and Trinidad and Tobago. In 2016 Lojer shipped 70 operating tables and associated accessories to Indonesia.

== The rise of physiotherapy ==
Through business acquisitions Lojer has become the largest supplier of physiotherapy equipment and accessories in Scandinavia. In 2015 the company bought the total share stock of Norwegian company Fysiopartner AS, Norway's leading distributor of physiotherapy and gym equipment. The deal also meant that Lojer acquired a sales organisation and online store in Norway.

In 2018 Lojer completed the purchase of Hegu Svenska Ab, Scandinavia's largest distributor of acupuncture needles. The company's range also includes kinesiology tapes.

As well as its own products, Lojer's range also includes other manufacturers’ physiotherapy products. For example, the anti-gravity AlterG treadmill, which is based on patented NASA technology, was brought to the Finnish and Swedish markets by Lojer in 2014.

== At the forefront of product development ==
Lojer develops its products primarily with a focus onto safety and practicality, and development work is carried out together with healthcare professionals. A good example of this is the Lojer Scandia operating table, which was launched in 2008. Upon its launch it received much praise from professionals for its design, ease of use and technical features. The Lojer Capre treatment table, brought onto the market in 2011, found its way into the annual review of modern Finnish design, the Finnish Design Yearbook.

The prototype for Lojer's Manuthera treatment table was made back in 1992. Early 2016 saw the launch of the Manuthera 242, which is designed for the therapist's most demanding examinations, treatments and procedures. It boasts several features, such as an impressive height adjustment range, tilt options and chest section flexibility in every direction. The internationally patented Manuthera won the 2017 Fennia Prize for defending intellectual property rights as well as for its innovative design, both in terms of appearance and technical features.

In 2011 Lojer began to be recognised internationally as a supplier of field operating tables, after supplying a large order of tables to the Finnish army and starting to make headway into NATO organisations. Lojer field operating tables had already been supplied to countries such as Sweden, Estonia, Australia and Singapore. The Finnish Red Cross has for some time been using Lojer field operating tables in disaster areas around the world, such as India and the earthquake-affected areas Haiti and Pakistan. The Hydraulic 310H operating table, launched in 2013, was developed in co-operation with the Finnish Red Cross.

Recovery chairs were originally developed for day surgery use, after a clear customer need was identified. A lengthy development process began, and the result is a modular patient chair that can be tailored to meet unique patient needs in various treatment scenarios. The product development process considered different user groups, interviews were carried out with surgeons, nursing staff and patients, and product usage was monitored in actual work environments.

Lojer's hospital beds have continually been developed in close co-operation with nursing staff. The latest beds feature better height adjustment possibilities and higher weight capacities, making them well suited for treating heavy patients or patients who need more space.

== The emergence of antimicrobial materials ==
Since 2016 Lojer has been a member of the HygTech Alliance, an alliance of Finnish companies that is offering the world's first complete range of hygienic products for resisting infections spread by touch. In creating its antimicrobial products Lojer has focussed on critical touch surfaces; on all these surfaces the traditional surface materials have been replaced with materials that actively stop the spread of bacteria. Also touch-free solutions – like a 2-piece adjustment bar - are added to some of the products.

Lojer supplied 80 antimicrobial examination tables to the new Meilahti children's hospital in Helsinki, which was opened in 2018. The metal surfaces of the tables are painted with a special paint that resists the growth of microbes, the upholstery features silver ion treatment and the accessories feature antimicrobial copper or painted surfaces. The treatment tables have the lowest height adjustment on the market, making them ideal for the little patients at the children's hospital.

== Lojer Medical service business – a new growing segment ==
Alongside its range of medical furniture and physiotherapy products, Lojer has also developed a comprehensive range of different services to complement the product sales. 2018 Lojer acquired Teoteam Oy's unit specialising in hospital equipment servicing.

Lojer launched its Functioning Care Facility service in 2013. In this concept the customer organisation does not own its beds, but instead leases them from Lojer. In addition to the beds themselves the customer receives all necessary mattresses, servicing and maintenance (including spare parts), and beds are exchanged when necessary. Leasing is also available for in-home care.

The law requires that healthcare organisations maintain a register of all healthcare equipment and accessories it uses. In 2017 Lojer launched the Lojer Easy Care equipment register, which allows healthcare organisations to maintain a real-time register of all their equipment.

In 2018 Lojer reached its highest ever turnover. Both the domestic market and the export market grew by one fifth. New export countries were for example France, Pakistan and Kazakhstan, and in total Lojer exported to 66 countries during the financial year.

== Acquiring Merivaara ==
In 2019 Lojer Oy is acquired Lahti-based healthcare technology company Merivaara Corporations hospital bed business operations. The agreed deal included Merivaara’s hospital beds and examination tables, stretchers and birthing beds.

In 2022, Lojer Oy acquired Merivaara Corporations entire share capital. In the acquisition, Lojer took over Merivaara's entire surgery products business, namely operating tables, operating room lighting, room control and AV systems and ceiling pendants. The sellers were the fund of the main shareholder, Intera Partners, and minority shareholders. The transaction will increase the turnover of the Lojer group to more than EUR 60 million.

During its history, Lojer has supplied products to 115 countries. In 2020, Finland's President Sauli Niinistö awarded Lojer Oy the Internationalisation Award of the President of the Republic.
