= Tyrvään Sanomat =

Finnish regional newspaper

- Type: Regional newspaper
- Owner: Alma Media Group
- Publisher: Suomen Paikallissanomat Oy
- Founded: 1894; 131 years ago
- Language: Finnish
- Headquarters: Sastamala
- Country: Finland
- Sister newspapers: Aamulehti; Iltalehti
- Website: Tyrvään Sanomat

Tyrvään Sanomat is a Finnish language newspaper published in Sastamala, Finland. It is the oldest local newspaper in the country.

== History and profile ==
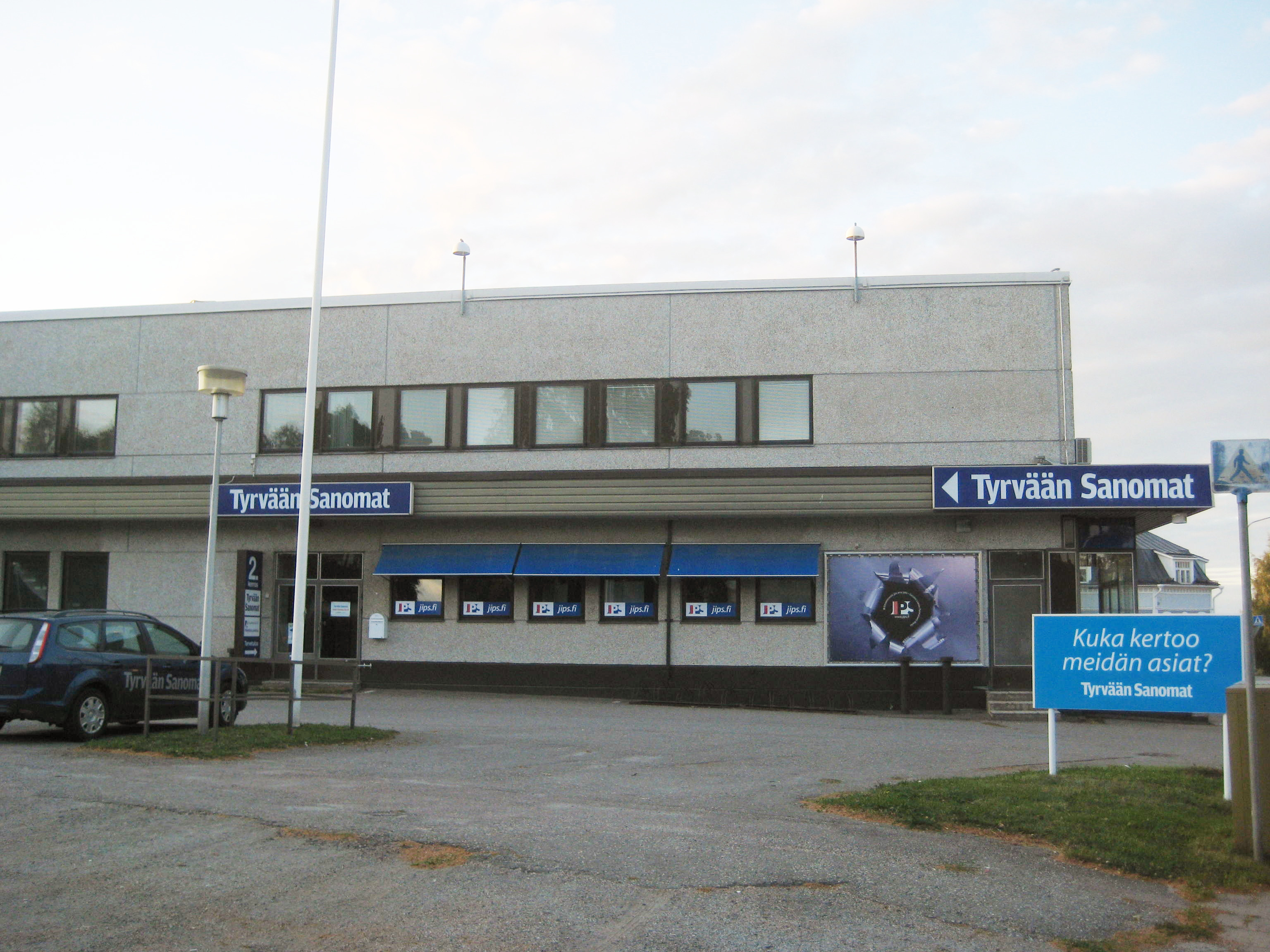
Tyrvään Sanomat headquarters

Tyrvään Sanomat was established by a primary school teacher in Tyrvää, Turku and Pori Province in 1894. The paper is based in Vammala, Sastamala and is distributed in the regions of Sastamala and Kiikoinen. The owner is the Alma Media Group which also owns many other newspapers, including Aamulehti and Iltalehti. The publisher of Tyrvään Sanomat was Tyrvään Sanomat Oy until 16 April 2010 when Suomen Paikallissanomat Oy, a subsidiary of Alma Media Group, became its publisher.

Tyrvään Sanomat became the first European newspaper which employed the VDT-based editorial system in 1974. As of 1998 the paper was published three times per week. Then its frequency became twice-weekly. Minna Ala-Heikkilä served as its editor-in-chief who was appointed to the post in 2008.

In 2013 the Finnish Newspapers Association awarded Tyrvään Sanomat in the category of the Good News story.

The 1997 circulation of Tyrvään Sanomat was 8,700 copies. In 2011 the paper sold 9,063 copies. Its circulation was 8,539 copies in 2012 and 8,032 copies in 2013.
