= Sensobiographic walking =

Sensobiographic walking is an ethnographic research method. It provides a possibility for the study of rich, embodied and site-specific emergence of sensory remembering and experiences.

== History ==
The method was developed by professor Helmi Järviluoma with her colleagues for studying transgenerational environmental relationships, engaging participant pairs composed of different generations for the large European Research Council project on Sensory Transformations (SENSOTRA) in Europe between 1950--2020. The method has many other roots as well. Soundscape Studies was one of the earliest humanities research fields, which used walking as a scholarly and artistic research method. Listening walking was developed into Sensory Memory Walking while carrying out the work for the Acoustic Environments in Change project (AEC) with researchers of The Centre for Research on Sonic Space and Urban Environment in Grenoble (CRESSON) in Lesconil, These scholars based their listening method on commented city walks of the sociologist Jean-Paul Thibaud. Sensobiography has, as well, been inspired by the concept of topobiography in human geography – the description of a life-course as it relates to lived places. To follow Doreen Massey (2005), it can be argued that, in cultural spaces, different times and temporalities fertilize each other experientially and epistemologically, creating new combinations where diachronic and synchronic methods can be interwoven into a multi-sited ethnography.

== Method ==
As an ethnographic fieldwork method, sensobiographic walking is simple. First, a person or a group of persons are asked to select a path somehow significant to them in the past. Once they have selected the path, they will be the one leading the walk. Second the questioner will walk this path with the researcher and possibly other participants and tell about the sounds, smells and other sensuous memories they have from that path in their childhood. Sensobiographic walking is a method for gathering research material on sensory environmental relationships.
