= Uutislehti 100 =

Finnish newspaper

- Type: Free newspaper
- Owner: Sanoma
- Founder: Janton Oy
- Founded: April 1997
- Ceased publication: 15 September 2008
- Language: Finnish
- Headquarters: Helsinki

Uutislehti 100 (Finnish for "Newspaper 100") was a Finnish free-of-charge newspaper published between 1997 and 2008. The paper was one of the earliest European free newspapers, being second after Metro Sweden.

== History and profile ==
Uutislehti 100 was first published in April 1997. Janton Oy was the first owner of the paper. In May 2004 it became part of the Sanoma media company.

It was available mainly in the Helsinki area. The paper was published every weekday except for public holidays and the month of July when the editors were on summer holiday. Sanoma employed people to distribute the magazine on the streets of Helsinki, and it was also available in the Helsinki City Transport trams.

One of the newspaper's most popular features was a talk page where people could send anonymous or signed messages via SMS.

The paper had a total of 300,000 readers in 2008.

On 15 September 2008 Uutislehti 100 merged with the Finnish edition of Metro.
