= Taloussanomat =

- Website type: Online Magazine
- Owner: Sanoma
- Website: Taloussanomat
- Commercial: Yes
- Registration: Optional
- Launched: 18 November 1997; 28 years ago

Taloussanomat is the largest business online daily newspaper in Helsinki, Finland.

== History and profile ==
Taloussanomat was first published on 18 November 1997. The final printed number (the 2537th) was published on 28 December 2007 when it went online-only. It has its headquarters in Helsinki.

Taloussanomat is owned by Sanoma, owner of Helsingin Sanomat. In 2010 it was the thirteenth most visited website in Finland in 2010 and was visited by 643,954 people per week.
