= Pohjolan Sanomat =

1915–2017 Finnish newspaper published in Kemi

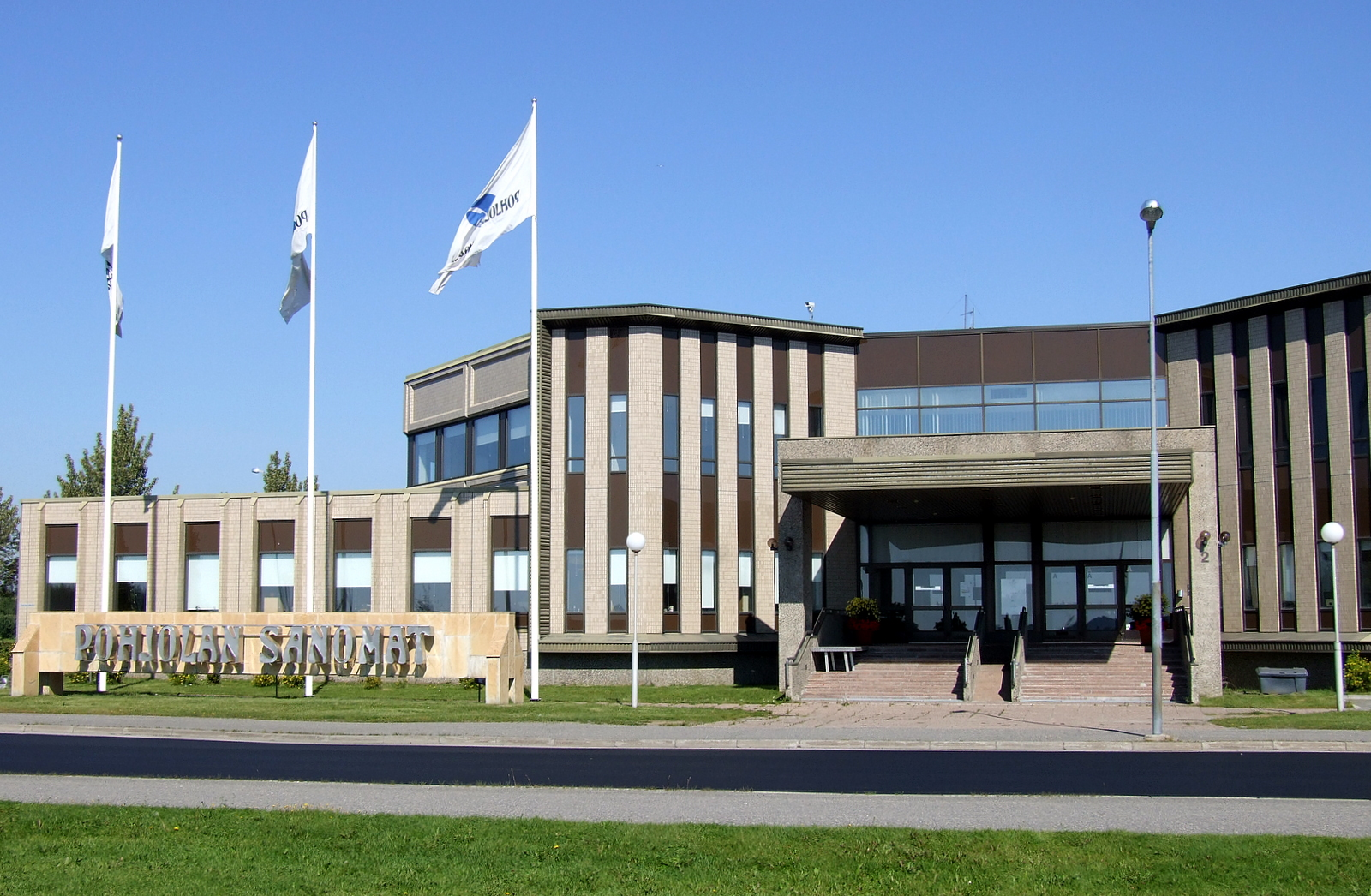
- Type: Newspaper
- Format: Tabloid
- Owner: Alma Media
- Publisher: Kaleva 2018
- Editor: Maria Jauho
- Founded: 1915
- Ceased publication: 2017
- Language: Finnish
- Headquarters: Kemi, Finland
- Circulation: 16,442 (2013)
- Website: Official site

Pohjolan Sanomat was a Finnish-language daily broadsheet newspaper published in Kemi, Finland.

== History and profile ==
Pohjolan Sanomat was established in 1915. The owner of the paper is Alma Media and the paper is based in Kemi. In June 2013 Kaleva publishing house began to publish the daily together with the group's other newspaper Lapin Kansa. Pohjolan Sanomat ceased publication in 2017.

Pohjolan Sanomat has a formal affiliation with the an agrarian-centrist Centre Party.

Maria Jauho was appointed senior editor-in-chief of the daily on 1 July 2014, replacing Heikki Lääkkölä in the post which he had held since 1996.

In January 2011 Pohjolan Sanomat changed its format from broadsheet to tabloid. The paper was published for seven days per week, but it became a five-day newspaper in 2014. However, its online edition is updated daily.

In 2002 the circulation of the paper was 23,483 copies. As of 2008 it had a circulation of 21,746 copies. The circulation of the paper was 16,442 copies in 2013.
