= Maaseudun Tulevaisuus =

Finnish newspaper

- Format: Broadsheet
- Owner(s): Central Union of Agricultural Producers and Forest Owners
- Publisher: Viestilehdet Oy
- Editor-in-chief: Jouni Kemppainen
- Managing editor: Jussi Martikainen; Tiina Taipale
- Founded: 1916; 109 years ago
- Political alignment: Independent
- Language: Finnish
- Headquarters: Helsinki
- Website: Official website

Maaseudun Tulevaisuus (MT; Finnish: the Rural Future) is a Finnish language newspaper published three times per week in Helsinki, Finland.

== History and profile ==
Maaseudun Tulevaisuus was first published in 1916. Its publisher is Viestilehdet Oy, which is owned by The Central Union of Agricultural Producers and Forest Owners (MTK).

The paper has a correspondent in Brussels since 1995 when Finland became a member of the European Union.

The paper focuses on news concerning agriculture and forestry management, rural businesses and country life. Maaseudun Tulevaisuus is published by The Central Union of Agricultural Producers and Forest Owners (MTK), which, in addition to its own political goals, traditionally has strong relations with the Center party. As of 2014 the editor-in-chief was Jouni Kemppainen. It has its headquarters in Helsinki and is published three times in a week, on Mondays, Wednesdays and Fridays.

Maaseudun Tulevaisuus is published in broadsheet format and consists of 22 pages. The paper has a special issue, Metsänomistaja (Forest Owner) which is published four times a year.

== Circulation ==
In 1993 Maaseudun Tulevaisuus was the fifth largest newspaper in Finland with a circulation of 110,951 copies. It was the sixth most read newspaper in the country in 2001 selling 89,197 copies. Maaseudun Tulevaisuus sold 84,000 copies in 2003, making it the sixth best selling newspaper in the country. In 2005 its circulation was 84,200 copies. The 2004 circulation of the paper was 82,000 copies.

Maaseudun Tulevaisuus was the fifth most read newspaper in the country in 2007. The number of its subscribers was 84,254 in 2008, and its circulation was 84,254 copies the same year. As of 2009 Maaseudun Tulevaisuus was the third most read paper in the country with a readership of 309,000. The same year the paper had a circulation of 83,044 copies. It was 83,158 copies in 2010.

In 2011 Maaseudun Tulevaisuus was the fourth largest paper in the country in terms of readership and had a circulation of 83,259 copies. In 2012 its circulation fell to 81,774 copies. The paper sold 80,754 copies in 2013.

== See also ==
- List of newspapers in Finland
