= Tekniikka&Talous =

- Editor-in-Chief: Mikko Virta
- Categories: Technology magazine News magazine
- Frequency: 41 issues per year
- Circulation: 80,400 (2024)
- Publisher: Alma Media Oyj
- Total circulation: 546,800 (2024)
- Founded: 1961
- First issue: 1961
- Company: Alma Media
- Country: Finland
- Based in: Helsinki
- Language: Finnish
- Website: Tekniikka&Talous
- ISSN: 0785-997X
- OCLC: 232114632

Tekniikka&Talous (Technology&Economy in English) is a Finnish language web service and news magazine published in Helsinki, Finland, which focuses on technology and innovations.

The average number of readers for the print edition is 80,400 and the magazine's total reach was 546,800 readers (2024). Tekniikka&Talous is the largest technology magazine in Finland.

A famous columnist for the publication is a pseudonymous writer known as "Perusinsinööri Veijo Miettinen," whose true identity has been the subject of speculation over the years.

== History and profile ==
Tekniikka&Talous is published by media house Alma Media Oyj. Tekniikka&Talous covers local and global news on business, innovation, science and technology. The print version of the magazine brings out 41 issues per year in tabloid format. The magazine targets decision makers in the fields of innovation, R&D and management as well as marketing and sales.

Tekniikka&Talous was previously published by Talentum. The magazine became part of new business unit Alma Talent, when Alma Media acquired Talentum in September 2015. Other well known brands of Alma Talent are Kauppalehti, Talouselämä, Uusi Suomi and Tivi.

Tekniikka&Talous is distributed to the members of Tekniikan Akateemiset, Academic Engineers and Architects in Finland.

The editor-in-chief of Tekniikka&Talous is Mikko Virta, who succeeded Harri Junttila in November 2024.

== Circulation ==
The print version of Tekniikka&Talous had 80,400 weekly readers in 2024. The web service reaches more than 500,000 weekly readers.

== See also ==
- List of magazines in Finland
