= Länsi-Savo =

Finnish language newspaper published in Finland

- Type: Newspaper
- Format: Broadsheet
- Publisher: Etelä-Savon Viestintä
- Founded: 1889; 137 years ago
- Language: Finnish
- Headquarters: Mikkeli
- Circulation: 22,352 (2013)
- Sister newspapers: Itä-Savo
- Website: www.lansi-savo.fi

Länsi-Savo is a Finnish language morning broadsheet newspaper published in Mikkeli, Finland.

== Publisher and circulation ==
The newspaper is published by Keskisuomalainen Media, which belongs to the media group Keskisuomalainen.

Keskisuomalainen Oyj bought Kaakon Viestintä from Länsi-Savo Oy in April 2019.

Kaakon Viestintä was formed at the beginning of 2015, when the regional newspapers Itä-Savo and Länsi-Savo of the Länsi-Savo Group were merged with Sanoma Lehtimedia, which published Etelä-Saimaa, Kouvolan Sanomat, and Kymen Sanomat. Sanoma Media Finland Oy was a part-owner until 25 February 2019, when the company’s entire share capital was transferred to the ownership of Länsi-Savo Oy.

The newspaper’s main circulation area is the Mikkeli region, but it also has some subscribers in the Pieksämäki region. It has about 97,000 readers including the digital issue (28,900 for print only).

The circulation of Länsi-Savo has been declining sharply, as has been the case with other Finnish newspapers.

Länsi-Savo’s editorial office is located in Kirjala, Mikkeli. The newspaper is printed at a printing house owned by the group in Kouvola.

== History and profile ==
The newspaper was founded in 1889 under the name Suomi. Its founder was Jaakko Päivärinta, a lecturer in religion and the Finnish language at the Mikkeli Lyceum, and the paper was published for a long time by O. B. Blomfelt. From 1893 to 1906, the newspaper’s name was Mikkeli, and after that Suur-Savo. From 1906 it was owned by Osuuskunta Mikkeli, and from 1912 onward by its own publishing company, which has been called Oy Länsi-Savo since 1929. The newspaper adopted its current name in 1917.

At first, the paper was the organ of the Young Finnish Party, and later of the Progressive Party. In 1917–1918, it also briefly served as the organ of the short-lived People’s Party. For a long time, Länsi-Savo was read mainly in rural areas, while its rival, the National Coalition–aligned Mikkelin Sanomat, was the most widely read newspaper in the city of Mikkeli until the 1930s. Länsi-Savo declared itself politically independent in 1951, when the Progressive Party ceased operations. The newspaper has been published seven days a week since 1965.
