= Kouvolan Sanomat =

Newspaper published in Kouvola, Finland

- Type: Newspaper
- Format: Tabloid
- Editor-in-chief: Petri Karjalainen
- Founded: 1909; 116 years ago
- Language: Finnish
- Circulation: 27,959 (2009)
- Website: Kouvolan Sanomat

Kouvolan Sanomat is a morning broadsheet newspaper in tabloid format published in Kouvola, Finland.

== History and profile ==
Kouvolan Sanomat was established in 1909. The paper is published by Sanoma Lehtimedia Oy which also publishes Etelä-Saimaa, Kymen Sanomat and Uutisvuoksi.

Kouvolan Sanomat had a circulation of 27,959 copies in 2009.
