= Pohjalainen =

Defunct Finnish newspaper

- Type: Daily newspaper
- Format: Broadsheet
- Owner: Ilkka-Yhtymä
- Publisher: Ilkka-Yhtymä
- Founded: 1903
- Ceased publication: 30 January 2020
- Political alignment: Neutral
- Language: Finnish
- Headquarters: Vaasa, Finland
- Circulation: 22,598 (2013)
- Sister newspapers: Ilkka
- Website: Pohjalainen

Pohjalainen was a morning broadsheet newspaper published in Vaasa, Finland. The paper was in circulation from 1903 to 2020.

== History and profile ==
Pohjalainen was established in 1903. It was based in Vaasa and part of the Ilkka-Yhtymä, which also owns the Seinäjoki local and regional paper Ilkka.

As of 2009 Arno Ahosniemi was the editor-in-chief. The paper had a circulation of 26,670 copies in 2009. Pohjalainen sold 22,598 copies in 2013.

In September 2019 it was announced Pohjalainen and Ilkka would be merged into a single newspaper, known as Ilkka-Pohjalainen, starting 30 January 2020.

== Editors ==
- 1903: O. E. Könni
- 1903–1905: Erkki Wallin-Voionmaa
- 1905–1910: H. J. Räisänen
- 1910–1913: Yrjö Kataja
- 1913–1924: V. J. Tuomikoski
- 1924–1941: Jaakko Ikola
- 1941–1950: Heikki Hyppönen
- 1951–1980: Ilmari Laukkonen
- 1981–1984: Jaakko Korjus
- 1985–1991: Erkki Malmivaara
- 1991–1996: Jaakko Elenius
- 1996–2002: Kari Mänty
- 2002–2009: Markku Mantila
- 2009: Arno Ahosniemi
- 2010–2013: Kalle Heiskanen
- 2014–2019: Toni Viljanmaa
