= Lapin Kansa =

Finnish newspaper published in Rovaniemi

- Type: Daily newspaper
- Format: Tabloid
- Owner: Lapin Kansa Oy/Kaleva Oy
- Publisher: Kaleva
- Editor: Antti Kokkonen
- Founded: 1928; 98 years ago
- Political alignment: Neutral
- Language: Finnish
- Headquarters: Rovaniemi, Finland
- Circulation: 10,000 (2024)
- Website: www.lapinkansa.fi

Lapin Kansa is a morning newspaper published in Lapland, Finland.

Media said in 2024, that it will be published 3 times a week (print edition), and 6 times a week for the digital edition.

== History and profile ==
Lapin Kansa was established in 1928. The newspaper is based in Rovaniemi. The owner of the paper is Alma Media. In June 2013 Kaleva publishing house began to publish the daily together with the group's other newspaper Pohjolan Sanomat.

Heikki Tuomi-Nikula is among the former editors-in-chief of the paper. On 1 October 2008 Johanna Korhonen was appointed the editor-in-chief. However, she was fired immediately after her appointment due to the fact that she was a lesbian. Antti Kokkonen replaced her in the post.

In January 2011 the daily changed its format from broadsheet to tabloid. Since 2011 Lapin Kansa has published news and reports in both North Sami language and Finnish.

In 2013 Lapin Kansa had a circulation of 28,992 copies.
