= Lex Tulenheimo =

The Power of Government Act or Lex Tulenheimo was a bill proposed by the Tokoi Cabinet in the spring of 1917 to the Finnish Parliament, whose purpose was to remove a significant part of the power of the Grand Duke of Finland and invest it in the Finnish Senate after the February Revolution.
