= Kainuun Sanomat =

Newspaper published in Kainuu, Finland

- Type: Daily newspaper
- Format: Tabloid
- Owner: Alma Media
- Editor: Markus Pirttijoki
- Founded: 1917; 108 years ago
- Political alignment: Neutral
- Language: Finnish
- Headquarters: Kajaani, Finland
- Circulation: 17,056 (2013)
- Website: www.kainuunsanomat.fi

Kainuun Sanomat is a Finnish morning newspaper published in Kainuu, as well as in some parts of the eastern former Oulu (province).

== History and profile ==
Kainuun Sanomat was established in 1917. The paper was originally distributed about three times per week until 1945 when it changed to six days a week. The owner of the paper has been Alma Media since 1998–1999. It is one of the local newspapers which founded Lännen Media, a news network, in October 2014.

The paper was published in broadsheet format until 2011 when it changed it to tabloid format.

Kainuun Sanomat was the organ of the Centre Party until 1994 when it became an independent paper. Reijo Korhonen served as the editor-in-chief of the paper between 1989 and 1994.

Kainuun Sanomat had a circulation of 22,152 copies in 2008. Its 2009 circulation was 22,000 copies. The circulation of the paper was 17,056 copies in 2013.

== Editors in-chief ==
The following is a list of the Editors in-chief of Kainuun Sanomat

- Jussi Kukkonen (1918–1954)
- Otso Kukkonen (1955–1989)
- Keijo Korhonen (1989–1994)
- Matti Piirainen (1995–2013)
- Markus Pirttijoki (2013–2019)
- Sanna Keskinen (2019–2020)
