= Kauppalehti =

Finnish business newspaper

- Type: Business newspaper
- Format: Tabloid
- Owner: Alma Media
- Publisher: Kustannus Oy Kauppalehti
- Founded: 1898
- Political alignment: Independent, right
- Language: Finnish
- Headquarters: Helsinki
- Country: Finland
- Sister newspapers: Aamulehti; Iltalehti
- ISSN: 0451-5560
- Website: Kauppalehti

Kauppalehti (Finnish: Trade Newspaper) is a commerce-oriented newspaper published in Helsinki, Finland. The paper has been in circulation since 1898.

== History and profile ==
Kauppalehti was established by the Finnish Businessmen's Association in 1898. Since 1919 the paper is published five or six times per week.

Kauppalehti is owned by the Business Information Group of Alma Media and is based in Helsinki. The sister papers of Kauppalehti are Iltalehti and Aamulehti. Their publisher is the Kustannus Oy Kauppalehti, and Kauppalehti is published in tabloid format.

In 2002 Kauppalehti began to offer a supplement, Saldo, together with the magazine Tekniikka ja Talous. The paper published a Saturday supplement, Presso, from October 2004 to December 2007.

Kauppalehti is the first Finnish newspaper which launched paywall in its online edition in 2012.

== Circulation ==
Kauppalehti sold 85,292 copies in 2001. Next year it was 84,626 copies. The 2003 circulation of the paper was 83,100 copies. In 2004 the paper had a circulation of 82,000 copies.

The circulation of Kauppalehti was 81,377 copies in 2006. The paper had a circulation of 81,363 copies in 2007. Its circulation in the years of 2008 and 2009 was 86,654 copies and 78,731 copies, respectively. The paper sold 70,118 copies in 2010 and 68,252 copies in 2011. Its circulation fell to 63,471 copies in 2012 and to 57,367 copies in 2013.

The website of Kauppalehti, which was launched in 1996, acts as an important hub for the business community. The website contains both Finnish and English articles. In 2010 it was the eleventh most visited website in Finland and was visited by 655,093 people per week.
