= Karjalainen (newspaper) =

Finnish daily newspaper

- Type: Daily newspaper
- Owner: Pohjois-Karjalan Kirjapaino Group
- Founder: Henrik Piipponen
- Founded: 1874; 152 years ago
- Language: Finnish
- Headquarters: Joensuu
- Country: Finland
- Website: Karjalainen

Karjalainen is a daily newspaper published in North Karelia, Finland. Being founded in 1874 it is the third oldest newspaper in the country.

== History and profile ==
The newspaper was first published in 1874 under the name Karjalatar. The founder was a teacher, Henrik Piipponen. In 1917, the paper switched its name to Karjalainen. In the mid-1950s it was published six times per week.

As of 2014 Karjalainen was part of the Pohjois-Karjalan Kirjapaino Group. The paper was previously part of the Väli-Suomen Media group which also owned another newspaper, Ilkka. Its headquarters is in Joensuu, and the paper is distributed in North Karelia, a region in eastern Finland. The circulation area of the paper is under the influence of the Eastern Orthodox Church.

Karjalainen had close links with the National Coalition party until 1995. The paper has been an independent publication since then. It is a partner of a newspaper association named Väli Suomen Media Oy. As of 2014 Pasi Koivumaa was the editor-in-chief of the daily.

Karjalainen was the first Finnish newspaper to publish the comic strip Phantom, which was published on 1 October 1940 with the title Fantom.

Karjalainen had a circulation of 30,687 copies in 1957. It sold 46,000 copies in 2010. The 2011 circulation of the paper was 44,728 copies. The paper had a circulation of 41,410 copies in 2013.
