= Salon Seudun Sanomat =

Finnish Newspaper

Salon Seudun Sanomat is a morning broadsheet newspaper published in Salo, Finland.

== History and profile ==
The newspaper was established in 1919. It is based in Salo. The publisher is TS-Yhtymä group which also publishes Turun Sanomat, Aamuset, Auranmaan Viikkolehti, Kaarina-lehti, Laitilan Sanomat, Loimaan Lehti, Paikallislehti Somero and Ykkössanomat.

In 2007 Salon Seudun Sanomat had a circulation of 22,216 copies. The circulation of the paper was 19,692 copies in 2013.
