= Det Vita Finland =

Government-backed Swedish- language newspaper published in White Finland

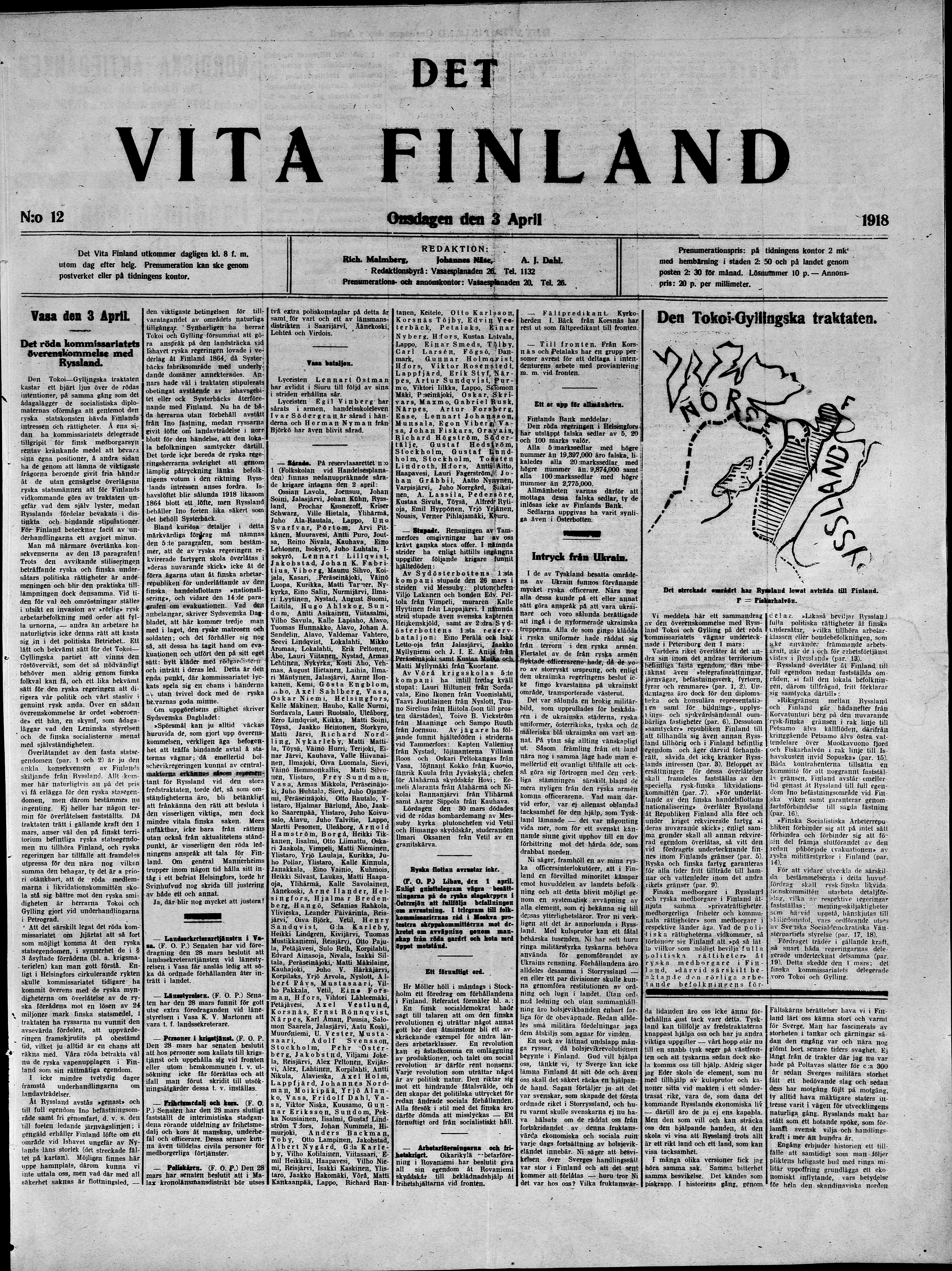
- Type: Daily newspaper
- Publisher: Mannerheim's Advisory Board
- Editor-in-chief: Richard Malmberg
- Editor: Johannes Näse, A. J. Dahl
- Founded: March 1918
- Political alignment: Anti-communist
- Language: Swedish
- Ceased publication: April 1918
- Headquarters: Vaasanpuistikko 26
- City: Vaasa
- Country: Finland
- Circulation: 22

Det Vita Finland was a political newspaper published by the Whites during the Finnish Civil War. It served as the Swedish- language parallel to the Valkoinen Suomi newspaper and was published in the city of Vaasa in Pohjanmaa. The Newspaper was to be published every day at 8 am, except Monday. The editors of the newspaper were Richard Malmberg, Johannes Näse and A. J. Dahl.

The newspaper served as a method of publishing the official position on stances of the Vaasa Senate and Mannerheim, along with publishing patriotic texts, news stories about the events in the Civil War and international relations relating to Finland. Eventually the Newspaper was limited and eventually ceased to publish in April, following its limitation by the armed forces and senate.
