= Ampparit =

Finnish online news portal

- Website type: News aggregator
- Available in: Finnish
- Website: ampparit.com
- Registration: Optional
- Launched: July 2004; 22 years ago
- Current status: Active

Ampparit.com is a Finnish online news portal founded in 2004. The service provides its users with an easy-to-use list of news headlines, consisting of material from Ampparit's more than 250 media sources. It is also possible for users to search for news of their special interest.

In addition to the news service, Ampparit.com includes a news map, a weather service, a TV program schedule, an online video service and a blog. The site can be customized by creating a user profile, which makes it possible to filter the contents by source, category or headline.

== Versions ==
=== Mobile versions ===
Two mobile versions of the service have been developed. The text version, Ampparit Mini, is designed for mobile phones with small screens, whereas Ampparit Lite serves the owners of devices with larger screens. Applications for iPhone, Android and Windows Phone users are also available. The possibility to create a customized user profile was introduced in autumn 2009 for Lite, and in October 2011 for Mini.

=== Witpik ===
Witpik is a professional media monitoring tool. In 2006, Joensuun Tiedepuisto Oy (Joensuu Science Park Inc.) organized a business idea competition under the name Ideka 2006. Ampparit participated with their idea Ampparit Pro – Business Intelligence, which won the third prize. As a result, Ampparit Pro was further developed into an information search service. During the winter of 2010, its name was changed to Witpik Media Monitoring prior to an expansion into the Russian market. In the following spring, a mobile version of Witpik was introduced.

== Reception ==
In a research conducted by TNS Metrix, Ampparit.com was the 30th most visited Finnish website during the week 48/2011's statistics on different web browsers. The site has more than 300,000 visitors per week, and one of the highest user return rates. According to the data from TNS Metrix and a survey by Digitoday, Ampparit.com is the most popular news aggregator in Finland.

It has been estimated that Ampparit.com, or news aggregators and RSS feeds in general, bring significant numbers of visitors to small news sites. Their effect on larger websites is much less significant. In spite of this, Ampparit and other similar services have managed to increase awareness of headlines' importance also among larger media companies.
