= Etelä-Saimaa =

Finnish newspaper published in Lappeenranta

- Type: Daily newspaper
- Format: Tabloid
- Publisher: Kaakon Viestintä
- Editor-in-chief: Pekka Lakka
- Founded: 1885
- Political alignment: Independent (since 1993); Agrarian League/Centre Party (1944–1993); National Progressive Party (1918–1944)
- Language: Finnish
- Ceased publication: 1914
- Relaunched: 1915; 110 years ago
- Country: Finland
- ISSN: 0357-0975

Etelä-Saimaa is a morning broadsheet daily newspaper published in Finland.

== History and profile ==
Etelä-Saimaa was established in 1885. The paper is published by Sanoma Lehtimedia Oy which also publishes Kouvolan Sanomat, Kymen Sanomat and Uutisvuoksi. The paper's hometown is Lappeenranta.

Its circulation was 29,424 copies in 2011.
