= Talouselämä =

Weekly Finnish business magazine

- Categories: Business magazine
- Frequency: Weekly
- Publisher: Talentum Media Oy
- Founded: 1938; 88 years ago
- Company: Talentum Media Oy
- Country: Finland
- Based in: Helsinki
- Language: Finnish
- Website: www.talouselama.fi
- ISSN: 0356-5106
- OCLC: 482387030

Talouselämä (Finnish for 'Economic Life') is a Finnish language weekly financial and business magazine published in Helsinki, Finland. It has been in circulation since 1938.

== History and profile ==
Talouselämä was established by Finnish businessmen in 1938. The magazine is published weekly by Talentum Media Oy. The company also publishes Tekniikka ja Talous.

The headquarters of Talouselämä is in Helsinki. Until the 1980s it was the only dominant business weekly in the country. The magazine provides financial news, including the origins and possible impacts of financial events. It also publishes reviews and research about Finnish companies and society. The magazine has several supplements, including Talouselämä Uratie.

Talouselämä started a lifestyle magazine in December 2010, Talouselämä Platinum, which was delivered to its subscribers.

Pekka Seppanes served as the editor-in-chief of the magazine. From 2000 to 2008 Terho Puustinen served in the post. Reijo Ruokanen was named as the editor-in-chief in September 2010. He also became the editor-in-chief of Fakta in August 2013, another magazine published by Talentum.

== Circulation ==
From 2002 to 2013, the magazine's circulation remained largely steady and unchanged.

| Year | Copies | Readers |
|---|---|---|
| 2002 | 78,804 | |
| 2007 | 79,000 | |
| 2009 | 79,684 | |
| 2010 | 79,406 | |
| 2011 | 80,800 | |
| 2012 | 80,868 | |
| 2013 | 81,280 | 184,000 |

== See also ==
- List of magazines in Finland
