= Sanoma =

Finland's largest media group

Sanoma Corporation
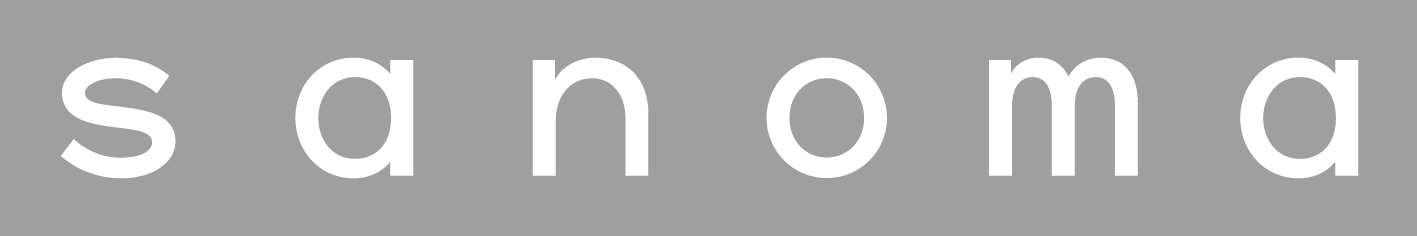
- Native name: Sanoma Oyj; Sanoma Abp
- Type: Public
- Traded as: Nasdaq Helsinki: SANOMA
- Industry: Media
- Founded: 1889; 137 years ago
- Headquarters: Helsinki, Finland
- Key people: Timo Lappalainen (chairman); Rob Kolkman (president and CEO)
- Products: Education materials and services, newspaper and magazine distribution, publishing, television, radio, events, online gaming
- Revenue: €1,289 million (2022)
- Operating income: €189 million (2022)
- Net income: (not reported)
- Total assets: €2.048 billion (2020)
- Total equity: €551 million (end 2010)
- Number of employees: 5,017 (FTE, end of 2023)
- Divisions: Sanoma Media Finland, Sanoma Learning
- Website: www.sanoma.fi

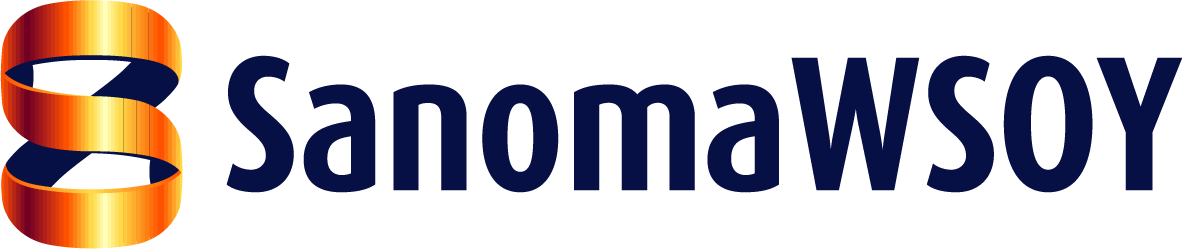
Sanoma's first logo from 1999 to 2008

Sanoma Corporation (Finnish: Sanoma Oyj, Swedish: Sanoma Abp, formerly SanomaWSOY) is Finland's largest media group and a European education publisher. The company has media business in Finland and an education business in twelve European countries, including Belgium, Netherlands, Poland, Sweden, Norway, Italy and Spain. Sanoma Corporation is headquartered in Helsinki. At the end of 2023, Sanoma net sales totalled €1.393 billion and the company had approximately 5,000 employees.

The story of Sanoma began in 1889 with the establishment of the newspaper Päivälehti in Finland. SanomaWSOY was formed in 1999 with the merger of Sanoma Corporation, WSOY (Werner Söderström Osakeyhtiö; Werner Söderström Corporation) and Helsinki Media Company. The group reverted to the name Sanoma Corporation in October 2008.

Sanoma operates in twelve European countries. Sanoma shares are listed on Nasdaq Helsinki.

The company consists of two divisions:

- Sanoma Learning: educational publishing and services
- Sanoma Media Finland: newspaper and magazine publishing, printing, TV, radio, events, and online gaming services. This includes the newspaper Helsingin Sanomat that was founded in 1889 as Päivälehti. Nelonen Media, which belongs to the group, has four television channels and several radio channels. In 2020, Sanoma acquired Alma Media's regional news media, the largest of which were Aamulehti and Satakunnan Kansa. The CEO of Sanoma Media Finland is Pia Kalsta.

In October 2020, Sanoma acquired the Spanish educational publisher Grupo Santillana and in 2022 the Italian and German education businesses from Pearson.
