= Etelä-Suomen Sanomat =

Finnish daily newspaper

- Type: Daily newspaper
- Owner(s): Mediatalo ESA
- Editor: Markus Pirttijoki
- Founded: 1914; 111 years ago
- Language: Finnish
- Headquarters: Lahti, Finland
- Circulation: 51,537 (2013)
- ISSN: 0359-5056
- Website: ess.fi

Etelä-Suomen Sanomat (lit. South Finland News), nickname Etlari) is a Finnish daily newspaper published in Lahti, Finland. It is the leading paper in its metropolitan area.

== History and profile ==
Etelä-Suomen Sanomat began publishing in 1914. The paper originated from the prior Lahden Lehti (1900–1909) and Lahden Sanomat (1909–1914) newspapers. The paper has a liberal editorial stance.

Heikki Hakala has served as editor-in-chief since 1996.

== Circulation ==
The circulation of Etelä-Suomen Sanomat began to grow during the 1940s. Its circulation was 67,185 copies in 2001. The 2004 circulation of the paper was 62,155 copies. The same year the paper had a readership of 145,000. The paper had a circulation of 60,889 copies. In 2007 the circulation of the paper was 61,003 copies.

In 2009 its circulation was 60,420 copies. Its circulation was 56,616 copies in 2011. The circulation of the paper was 51,537 copies in 2013.

== Chief editors ==
- Oskar Marjanen 1914
- Kaarlo Kytömaa 1914–1915
- Jaakko Tervo 1915–1920
- Jalmari Niemi 1920–1927
- William Ilmoni 1927–1932
- Frans Keränen 1932–1962
- Tauno Lahtinen 1962–1983
- Olli Järvinen 1962–1973
- Eeva Rissanen 1972–1986
- Kauko Mäenpää 1984–1999
- Pentti Vuorio 1986–1995
- Heikki Hakala 1997–2014
- Perttu Kauppinen 2015–2018
- Markus Pirttijoki 2019–
