= Länsi-Suomi =

Morning broadsheet newspaper in Finland

Länsi-Suomi (lit. 'Western Finland') is a morning broadsheet newspaper published in Finland, based in Rauma.

== History and profile ==
Länsi-Suomi was established in 1905. The paper is part of Marva Group and is based in Rauma. Until 1992 the paper supported the conservative Coalition Party.

As of 2009 Länsi-Suomi had a circulation of 16,833 copies. Its circulation was 14,391 copies in 2013.
