= Alma Media =

Finnish media and digital service business company

Alma Media Oyj
- Company type: Julkinen osakeyhtiö
- Traded as: Nasdaq Helsinki: ALMA
- Industry: Publishing
- Headquarters: Helsinki, Finland
- Key people: Kai Telanne (CEO)
- Revenue: ▼ M€250.2 (2019)
- Operating income: ▼ M€49.4 (2019)
- Website: www.almamedia.fi

Alma Media Oyj is a Finnish media and digital service business company. Its best known products are Iltalehti, Kauppalehti, Talouselämä, Ampparit, Monster.fi and Etuovi.com.

In addition to news services, the company's products provide information related to lifestyle, career and business development. The services of Alma Media have expanded from Finland to the Nordic countries, the Baltics and Central Europe. Alma Media employs approximately 1,800 people. The group's revenue in 2019 totalled approximately EUR 250.2 million.

== Business segments ==
Alma Media's business units are Alma Markets, Alma Talent and Alma Consumer.

=== Alma Markets ===
Alma Markets segment includes several online services. The services are related to sectors such as housing (Etuovi.com, Vuokraovi.com, NettiKoti, Kivi and Urakkamaailma), recruitment (Monster.fi, Jobs.cz, Prace.cz, CV Online, Profesia.sk, MojPosao.net, and Monster.cz) as well as mobility (Autotalli.com and Autojerry.fi).

=== Alma Talent ===
Alma Talent publishes trade and financial magazines and newspapers, as well as a variety of books. The business unit will also offer skills development and growth services to professionals and businesses in different fields, from events and training to information services.

Alma Talent media include Kauppalehti, Talouselämä, Tekniikka & Talous, Mikrobitti, Arvopaperi, Tivi and Mediuutiset. In Sweden, publications by Alma Talent include Ny Teknik.

=== Alma Consumer ===
Alma Consumer publishes the national news media Iltalehti, regional newspapers Aamulehti, Satakunnan Kansa, and the local and town papers published in the Pirkanmaa region as well as in western and central Finland. The offering of the business segment also includes several digital consumer services related to lifestyle, travel, cooking and dating. The printing unit Alma Manu is also part of the business segment.

== History in brief ==
- Suomalaisen Kirjallisuuden Seuran Kirjapainon Osakeyhtiö (Finnish Literature Society's Printing Company Ltd) starts operating in 1849 and prints the Suometar newspaper.
- Alma's biggest newspapers are founded around the century: Satakunnan Kansa (1873), Aamulehti (1881), Kauppalehti (1898), Pohjolan Sanomat (1915), Kainuun Sanomat (1917) and Lapin Kansa (1928). Iltalehti is founded in 1980.
- Tampereen Kirjapaino Oy and Uusi Suomi Oy are merged in 1988 to become one of Finland's largest newspaper publishers. The new company is later named Aamulehti Corporation.
- Over the years, the company expands its business from newspapers to online services, television and radio.
- Alma Media Corporation officially begins operating in 1998.
- A major restructuring took place in Alma Media in 2005. The company divested its broadcasting business and decided to focus on publishing newspapers, business information and online marketplaces.
- In December 2011 Alma acquired LMC s.r.o. Czech leading provider of Jobs.cz, Prace.cz jobboards and LMC G2 e-recruitment solution.
