= Ilta-Sanomat =

Finnish tabloid newspaper

- Type: Daily newspaper
- Format: Tabloid
- Owner: Sanoma
- Editor-in-chief: Johanna Lahti
- Founded: 1932; 94 years ago
- Headquarters: Helsinki
- Circulation: 55,000 (as of 2024)
- Sister newspapers: Helsingin Sanomat
- Website: www.is.fi

Ilta-Sanomat (Finnish for 'the evening news') is one of Finland's two prominent tabloid-size evening newspapers and the largest paper in the country. Its counterpart and biggest rival is Iltalehti.

According to the National Media Research done in 2019, Ilta-Sanomat is also the biggest digital media in Finland and reaches about 2.5 million Finns.

Johanna Lahti has been the editor-in-chief of Ilta-Sanomat since November 2019, when the previous editor-in-chief Tapio Sadeoja retired after 38 years in office.

== History and profile ==
The paper was established in 1932 as the afternoon edition of Helsingin Sanomat. In 1949 it became a separate newspaper and was named Ilta-Sanomat.

Its sister paper is Helsingin Sanomat and both papers are part of Sanoma. Ilta-Sanomat is published in tabloid format six times per week. The paper has an independent political stance.

== Circulation ==
The circulation of Ilta-Sanomat was 212,854 copies in 1993, making it the second largest newspaper in Finland after its sister paper Helsingin Sanomat. In the period of 1995-1996 the paper had a circulation of 213,600 copies.

Ilta-Sanomat had a circulation of 215,000 copies in 2000. Its circulation was 218,829 copies in 2001, making it the second most read paper in the country. In 2002 it had a circulation of 214,610 copies on weekdays and 243,443 copies in weekends. It was again the second best selling newspaper with the paper-based circulation on a declining trajectory at 205,000 copies in 2003. Next year the circulation of the paper was down to 201,000 copies.

The circulation continued to fall, to 195,673 copies in 2005, 186,462 copies in 2006, and 176,531 copies in 2007. The circulation of Ilta-Sanomat was 161,615 copies in 2008 and 152,948 copies in 2009. It was 150,351 copies in 2010 and 143,321 copies in 2011.

In 2010 the online version of Ilta-Sanomat was the second most visited website in Finland in 2010 and was visited by 1,823,956 people per week.

== Editors-in-chief ==
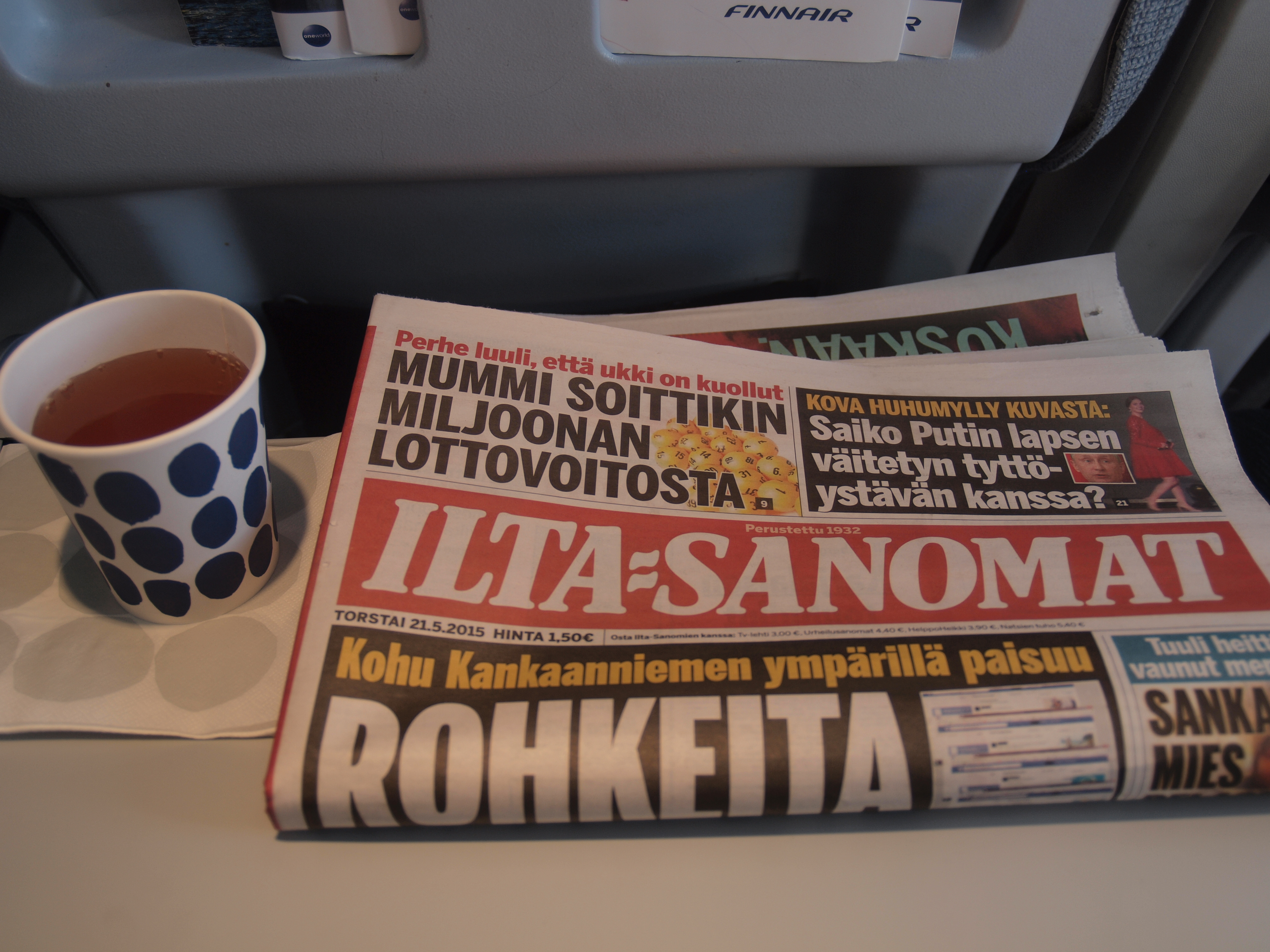
"Ilta-Sanomat" newspaper

- Johanna Lahti 2019–
- Reijo Ruokanen ?–2010
- Tapio Sadeoja 2007–2019
- Hannu Savola 2006–2007
- Antti-Pekka Pietilä 2003–2006
- Vesa-Pekka Koljonen 1984–2003
- Martti Huhtamäki 1974–1983
- Olavi Aarrejärvi 1966–1973
- Heikki Tikkanen 1961–1966
- Teo Mertanen 1956–1961
- Eero Petäjäniemi 1949–1956
- Yrjö Niiniluoto 1938–1949 (also the editor-in-chief Helsingin Sanomat)
- Eljas Erkko 1932–1938 (also the editor-in-chief Helsingin Sanomat)

== See also ==
- List of newspapers in Finland
