= Kymen Sanomat =

Daily newspaper published in Kymenlaakso, Finland

Kymen Sanomat (KySa) is a Finnish language daily newspaper published in the Kymenlaakso region of Finland.

== History and profile ==
The newspaper was established in 1902. Kymen Sanomat has its editorial headquarters in Kotka. The paper is published in Hamina. The publisher is Sanoma Lehtimedia Oy which also publishes Etelä-Saimaa and Uutisvuoksi.

In 1991 Kymen Sanomat merged with Kotkan Sanomat.

Kymen Sanomat had approximately 62,000 readers in 2007. The paper had a circulation of 24,216 copies in 2009.
