= Ilkka (newspaper) =

Finnish newspaper

- Owner: Ilkka Group
- Publisher: Ilkka-Yhtymä Oyj
- Founded: 1906
- Ceased publication: 2020
- Language: Finnish
- Headquarters: Seinäjoki
- Circulation: 49,171 (2013)
- Sister newspapers: Pohjalainen
- Website: Ilkka

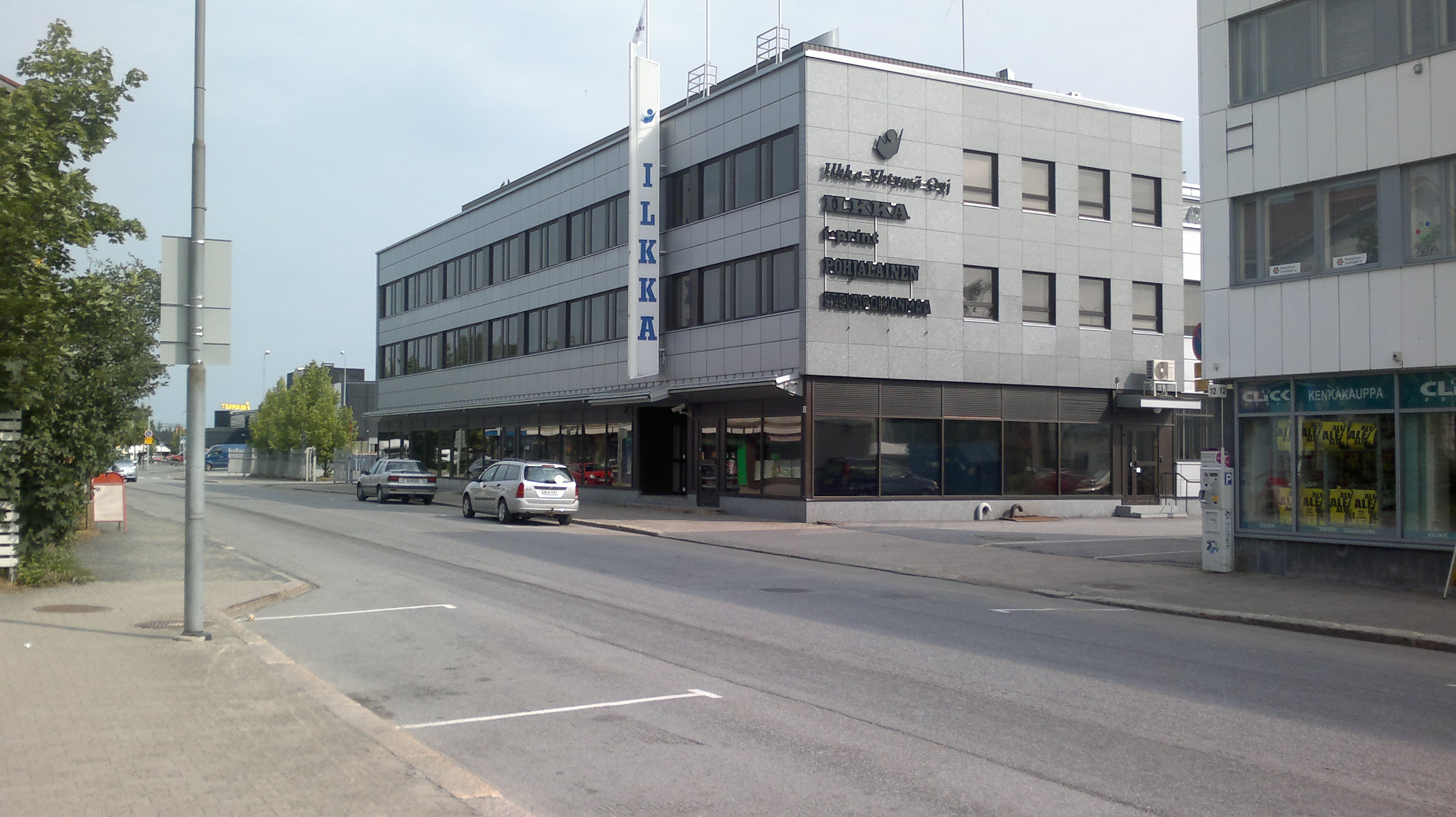
Ilkka-Yhtymä Oyj's headquarters in Seinäjoki.

Ilkka was a Finnish morning newspaper published in Seinäjoki, Finland from 1906 to 2020.

== History and profile ==
Ilkka was established in Vaasa in 1906 as an independent newspaper. The name may be a reference to Jaakko Ilkka, a 16th-century rebellion leader in the Cudgel War, but this is unconfirmed. The founders of the paper were Santeri Alkio and his supporters. Later its headquarters in Vaasa was moved to Seinäjoki. Ilkka was part of the Ilkka Group which also owned Pohjalainen. The publisher was Ilkka-Yhtymä Oyj.

Ilkka later became a supporter of the Centre Party and remained as such until 1997 when it declared its independence.

The circulation of Ilkka was 55,395 copies in 2001. The paper sold 49,171 copies in 2013.

In September 2019 it was announced Ilkka and Pohjalainen would be merged into a single newspaper, known as Ilkka-Pohjalainen, starting from 30 January 2020.

== Editors ==
- 1906–1930: Santeri Alkio
- 1930–1957: Artturi Leinonen
- 1957–1980: Veikko Pirilä
- 1980–2007: Kari Hokkanen
- 2008–2012: Matti Kalliokoski
- 2012–2019: Satu Takala
