= Satakunnan Kansa =

Finnish newspaper published in Pori

- Type: Daily newspaper
- Format: Tabloid
- Owner: Sanoma
- Editor: Tomi Lähdeniemi
- Founded: 1873; 153 years ago
- Political alignment: Neutral
- Language: Finnish
- Headquarters: Pori, Finland
- Circulation: 45,050 (2013)
- Website: www.satakunnankansa.fi

Satakunnan Kansa (abbreviated SK, literally translated the "People of Satakunta") is a Finnish language regional newspaper published in Pori, Finland. In 2024, it will merge into Satakunta Kansa Länsi-Suomi, and the long new name has raised eyebrows for being an awkward tongue twister.

== History and profile ==
The newspaper was established under the name of Satakunta in 1873. In Finland it is the second oldest newspaper which is still in distribution. It was renamed as Satakunnan Kansa in 1917 when the papers Satakunta and Satakunnan Sanomat (1907–1917) were merged.

Satakunnan Kansa is part of Alma Media. The headquarters of the paper is in Pori. Outside the Satakunta region it is distributed in Kristinestad, Ikaalinen and Laitila.

Satakunnan Kansa was published in broadsheet format until 17 January 2012 when it began to be published in tabloid format. Petri Hakala served as the editor-in-chief of the paper. Tomi Lähdeniemi has been the editor-in-chief since September 2014.

The circulation of Satakunnan Kansa was 56,781 copies in 2001. The 2004 circulation of the paper was 55,904 copies. The same year the paper had a readership of 147,000. As of 2007 it had a circulation of 55,302 copies. In 2013 its circulation was 45,050 copies and its readership was 116,000. In 2024, the circulation of Satakunnan Kansa Länsi-Suomi was 377 500, and its readership was 89 000.
