= Itä-Savo =

Finnish daily newspaper

- Type: Daily newspaper
- Format: Berliner
- Founded: 1907; 118 years ago
- Language: Finnish
- Headquarters: Savonlinna
- OCLC number: 751757703
- Website: Itä-Savo

Itä-Savo is a Finnish language daily newspaper published in Savonlinna, Finland. It has been in circulation since 1907.

== History and profile ==
The paper was established in 1907 under the title of Savolainen and was a media outlet of the Old Finns Party. It was renamed as Itä-Savo following the Independence of Finland in 1917.

Itä-Savo was one of the papers owned by the Agrarian Party in the 1950s. Since 2002 the paper has no political affiliation.

As of 2007 the publisher of Itä-Savo was a company with the same name which was part of the Länsi-Savo Corporation. Its publisher is Etelä-Savon Viestintä Oy, a subsidiary of Länsi-Savo Corporation, and it has its headquarters in Savonlinna. The paper is published in Berliner format.

Kyösti Pienimäki was the editor-in-chief of Itä-Savo in 2007. Tuomo Yli-Huttula served in the post until October 2012 when Tiina Ojutkangas succeeded him as editor-in-chief of the paper.

== Circulation ==
Itä-Savo sold 10,094 copies in 1957. Its circulation was 18,143 copies, and it had nearly 49,000 readers in 2007. The paper had a circulation of 14,834 copies in 2013. The number of its readers was 35,000 in 2014.
