= Iltalehti =

Tabloid newspaper published in Helsinki, Finland

- Type: Newspaper
- Format: Tabloid
- Owner: Alma Media
- Editor-in-chief: Erja Yläjärvi
- Founded: 1980; 46 years ago
- Political alignment: Neutral
- Headquarters: Helsinki
- Circulation: 44,000 (2024)
- Sister newspapers: Aamulehti; Kauppalehti
- ISSN: 0783-0025 (print); 1797-7983 (web)
- Website: iltalehti.fi

Iltalehti (lit. 'Evening newspaper') is a tabloid newspaper published in Helsinki, Finland.

== History and profile ==
Iltalehti was established in 1980 by Helsinki-based Alma Media. Its sister newspapers are Aamulehti and Kauppalehti. Iltalehti is published in tabloid format six times per week.

Petri Hakala served as the editor-in-chief of Iltalehti. On 1 September 2010, Panu Pokkinen was appointed to the post. His term ended in December 2013 when Petri Hakala was reappointed to the post.

== Circulation ==
The circulation of Iltalehti was 105,059 copies in 1993. The 2001 circulation of the paper was 134,777 copies, making it the fourth most read newspaper in Finland. In 2002, Iltalehti had a circulation of 132,836 copies on weekdays. The circulation of the paper was 126,000 copies in 2003, making it the fourth best selling newspaper in the country. The circulation was 130,000 copies in 2004, 130,290 copies in 2005, and 133,007 copies in 2006.

Its circulation was 131,150 copies in 2007. In 2008, Iltalehti was the third largest newspaper in Finland. Among tabloid newspapers, the paper had a market share of 40% and its biggest (and only) rival Ilta-Sanomat had a market share of 60% in 2008. Its circulation was 122,548 copies in 2008 and it had dropped to 112,778 copies by 2009. It had a circulation of 107,052 copies in 2010 and 102,124 copies in 2011. The newspaper had fallen to 91,219 copies by 2012 and fell again to 78,617 copies in 2013.

In 2010, the online version of Iltalehti was the most-visited website in Finland with 1,937,156 people per week. In May 2015, it was the sixth most popular website in the country according to Alexa.
