= Aamulehti =

Finnish-language daily newspaper published in Tampere, Finland

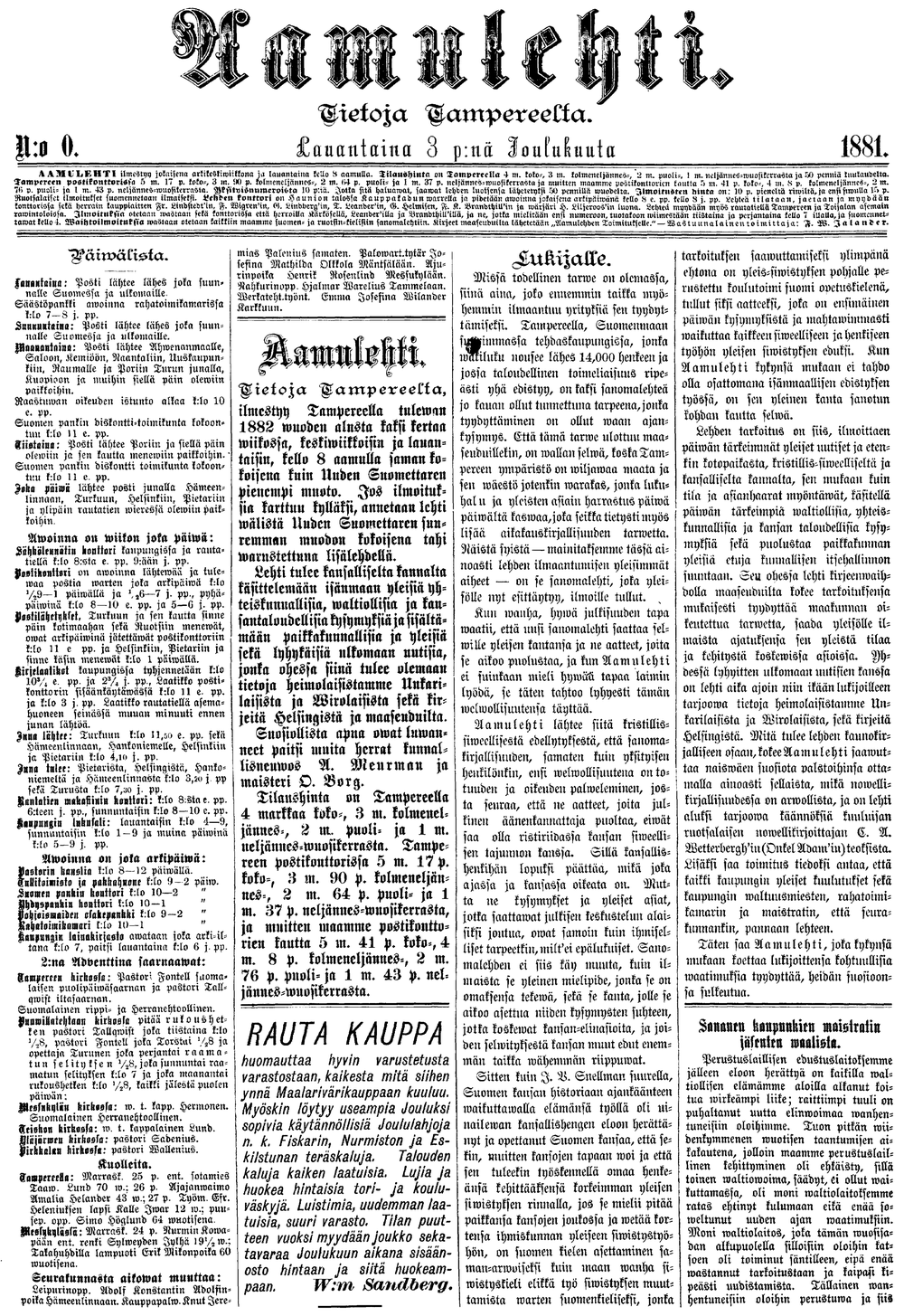
- Front page of first edition (3 December 1881)
- Type: Daily newspaper
- Format: Compact
- Owner: Sanoma
- Founder: F. V. Jalander
- Founded: 1881; 145 years ago
- Political alignment: Neutral
- Language: Finnish
- Headquarters: Nalkala, Tampere
- Circulation: 114,231 (2013)
- ISSN: 0355-6913
- Website: www.aamulehti.fi

Aamulehti (lit. 'morning newspaper') is a Finnish-language daily newspaper published in Tampere, Finland. Established in 1881 by Finnish patriots in Tampere, the newspaper aimed to bolster the Finnish language and people's identity during Russia's reign over Finland. Throughout the Cold War, Aamulehti was accused by the Soviet Union of spreading US propaganda, leading to protests from the Soviet Embassy in Helsinki. In the 1980s, the newspaper's parent company acquired and later closed down Uusi Suomi. In 2014, Aamulehti transitioned from broadsheet to tabloid format.

Until 1992, the newspaper aligned with the National Coalition Party, but it is no longer politically affiliated. Ownership shifted from Aamulehti Corporation to Alma Media in 2003. In 2020, Sanoma corporation acquired Alma Media, thereby assuming ownership of Aamulehti. Aamulehti's content includes regular features and supplements like "Moro" for Tampere's culture, "Valo" for entertainment, and "Asiat" and "Ihmiset" for Sunday readers. The newspaper also explores journalism innovation regularly.

Circulation-wise, Aamulehti's growth was notable, peaking in 2008 when it consistently ranked among Finland's top newspapers. However, circulation figures have varied over time. By 2014, it held the second-largest circulation in Finland. The online version also attracts significant traffic, making it one of the most visited websites in the country by 2010.

== History and profile ==
Aamulehti was founded in 1881 to "improve the position of the Finnish people and the Finnish language" during Russia's rule over Finland. The founders were nationalistic Finns in Tampere.

During the Cold War period Aamulehti was among the Finnish newspapers which were accused by the Soviet Union of being the instrument of US propaganda, and the Soviet Embassy in Helsinki frequently protested the editors of the paper.

In the 1980s, Aamulehti Corporation acquired the paper Uusi Suomi, which they shut down in 1991. Aamulehti was published in broadsheet format until April 2014 when the paper switched to tabloid format. Matti Apunen was the editor-in-chief of the paper until 2010. The paper is based in Tampere and serves the Pirkanmaa region.

Until 1992 the paper aligned itself with the National Coalition Party, but it no longer has an official connection to any political party.

Aamulehti Corporation was the owner of Aamulehti until 2003 when the paper was acquired by Alma Media, a large media corporation in Finland, for a reported 460 million euros. In 2020, the Sanoma corporation acquired Alma Media, and thus, also Aamulehti.

Since 2006 Aamulehti has published four weekly supplements —: Moro (meaning "Hi" in the dialect of the Tampere region, and devoted to the culture of Tampere) on Thursday, the entertainment-centred Valo (lit. 'Light') published on Friday, as well as both Asiat (lit. 'Matters') and Ihmiset (lit. 'People') on Sunday. The paper covers innovation journalism at least once a month.

== Circulation ==
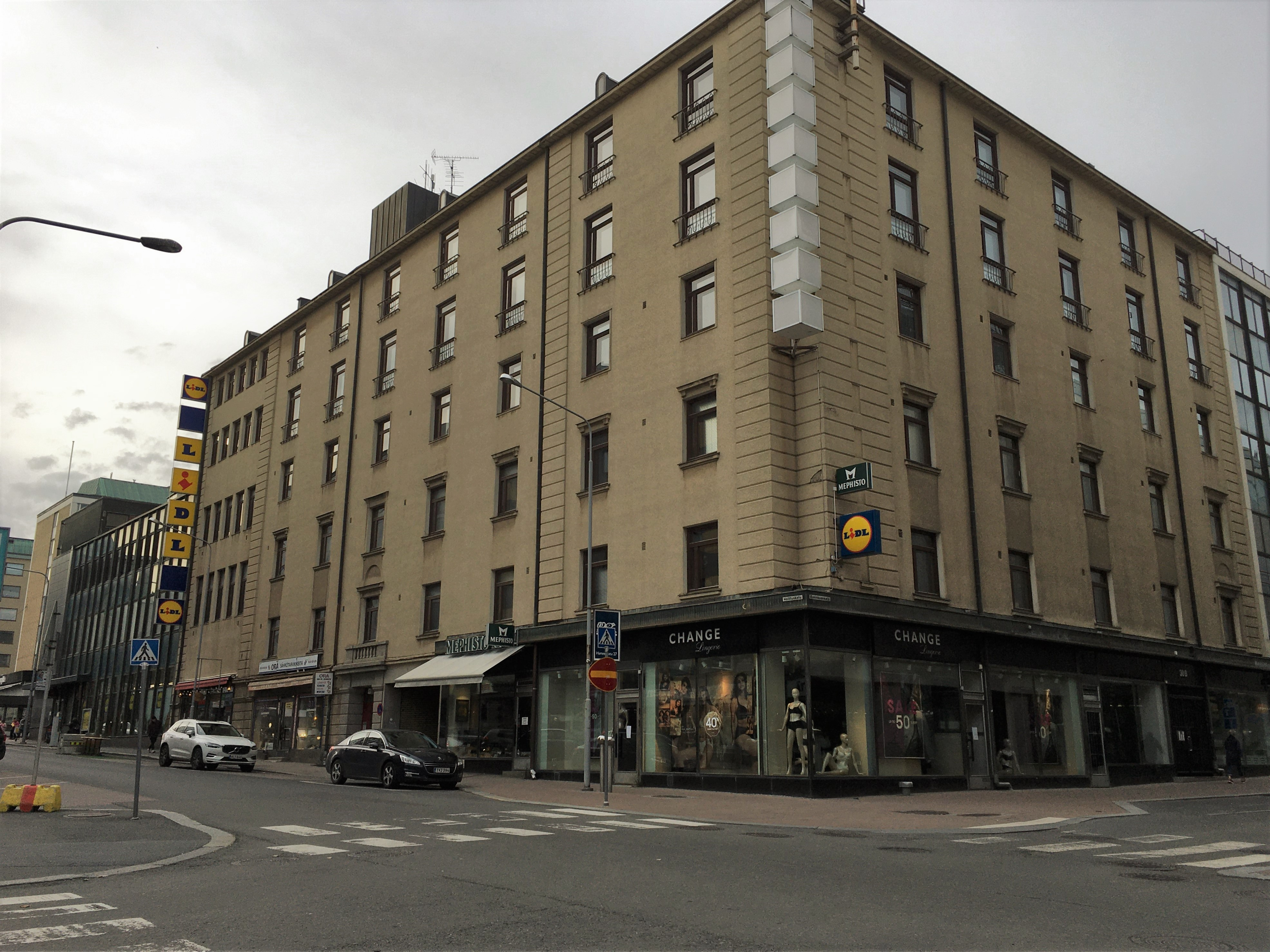
An office building of Aamulehti in the Nalkala district

Peaking in 2008, Aamulehti grew steadily, regularly reporting the third-highest newspaper circulation numbers in Finland. The circulation was 135,194 copies in 1993, reaching 135,478 copies in 2001. By 2004 the paper had an average daily circulation of 136,028 copies per day and 140,802 copies on Sundays, with an estimated readership of 329,000. Aamulehti's circulation was 136,743 copies in 2005; 138,258 copies (2006); 139,165 copies (2007) — reaching a high-water mark of 139,130 copies in 2008, then declining to 135,293 copies in 2009; 131,539 copies (2010); 130,081 copies (2011); and 114,231 copies in 2013.

By 2014 Aamulehti had Finland's second-largest circulation and had the fifth-largest estimated readership. In 2010, with 262,947 weekly visitors, the online version of Aamulehti was the twenty-third most visited website in Finland.

== Controversies ==
Aamulehti deleted 551 stories written by a long time reporter Matti Kuusela. The stories were deleted after Kuusela admitted in his memoir that he had made up parts of his writings over the years.

== See also ==
- Tamperelainen
