= List of Finnish magazines =

The first magazine in Finland, a Swedish-language women's magazine named Om Konsten at rätt behaga, was published in 1782. The number of the Finnish magazines was about 1,200 in the 1980s. It increased to 4,275 in 1985. In the 1990s, the circulation of magazines increased, being 5.4 million copies in 1990 and 6.2 million copies in 1999. There were 4,818 periodicals and magazines in 1995.

The number of magazines was 2,819 in 2001 and 4,922 in 2005. Magazines accounted for 18% of the Finnish press market in 2007. There were 3,300 magazines in 2008, half of which were trade and business magazines. Total circulation of the magazines was 13.8 million in 2008. In 2009, 29 new magazines were launched.

This is an incomplete list of magazines published in the country. These magazines are published in Finnish or in other languages.

== Boat magazines ==
- Kippari
- Navigare
- Pro Sail Magazine
- Puuvene
- Venelehti
- Venemestari

== Car magazines ==
- Auto Bild Suomi
- GTi-Magazine
- Mobilisti
- Moottori
- Spinneri Magazine
- Tekniikan Maailma
- Tuulilasi
- V8-Magazine

== Computer magazines ==
- Enter
- KotiMikro (Kompuutteri kaikille)
- Mikrobitti
- MikroPC
- Nintendo-lehti
- Pelaaja
- Pelit
- Printti
- Prosessori
- Super Power
- Skrolli
- Tietokone
- Tilt
- Tivi

== Crime magazines ==
- Alibi
- Rikosposti

== Cultural magazines ==
- Aikalainen
- Ateneum
- Basso
- Etsijä
- Filmihullu
- Finsk Tidskrift
- Free!
- Hiidenkivi
- Image
- Kanava
- Kaltio
- Kerberos
- Kirjo
- Kulttuurivihkot
- Kumppani
- Liekki
- Lumooja
- MotMot
- Neliö
- Nuori Voima
- Parnasso
- Propaganda
- Quosego
- Rondo
- Revontulet
- SixDegrees
- Taite
- Toinen vaihtoehto
- Tuli & Savu
- Ultra
- Vartija
- Vegaia
- Z

== Current events magazines, formal ==
- Kumppani
- Ovi Magazine
- Suomen Kuvalehti
- Viikkosanomat

== Current events magazines, informal ==
- Apu
- Hymy
- Seura

== Design and living ==
- Avotakka
- Glorian antiikki
- Glorian koti
- Kaunis Koti
- Meidän Mökki
- Meidän Talo

== Economic magazines ==
- Arvopaperi
- Ässä
- Ekonomi
- Fakta
- Forum
- Kehittyvä liikkeenjohto
- Markkinointi & Mainonta
- Presso
- Talouselämä
- Taloustaito
- Tehostaja
- Tekniikka ja Talous

== Family and home magazines ==
- Kaksplus
- Kodin Kuvalehti
- Kotiliesi
- Valitut Palat

== Men's lifestyle magazines ==
- Aatami
- AKU.
- Slitz
- Urkki

== Music magazines ==
- Blues News
- Euterpe
- Inferno
- Musa.fi
- POP
- Rondo
- Rumba
- Rytmi
- Soundi
- Sue
- Trad

== Occultistic magazines ==
- Hermeetikko
- Ultra

== Paparazzi magazines ==
- 7 päivää
- Katso!
- Oho!

== Political magazines ==
- .kom
- Debatti
- Garm
- Kansan tahto
- Kurikka
- Libero
- Murros
- Muutoksen kevät
- Paukku
- PAX
- Rauhan Puolesta
- Siniristi
- Tilanne
- Tuisku
- Työläisnainen
- Ulkopolitiikka
- Uusi Nainen
- Velikulta
- Vihreä Lanka
- Ydin

== Pornographic magazines ==
- Erotiikan Maailma
- Haloo!
- Hustleri
- Jallu (lehti)
- Kalle
- Lollo
- Napakymppi

== Professional magazines ==
- Journalisti
- Kirjatyö
- Kuntalehti
- Lakimies
- Maankäyttö
- Opettaja

== Public transport magazines ==
- Hetku
- Raitio
- Resiina

== School magazines ==
- Kevätpörriäinen
- Koululainen
- Oulun Koulun Kohinaa

== Scientific magazines ==
- Avaruusluotain
- Historiallinen Aikakauskirja
- Kasvatus
- Kielikello
- Niin & näin
- Tähdet ja avaruus
- Tiede
- Tiedepolitiikka
- Tieteen Kuvalehti
- Tieteessä tapahtuu
- Virittäjä

== Sport magazines ==
- Fillari
- Futari
- GOAL
- Jääkiekkolehti
- Juoksija
- Sport
- Urheilulehti
- Vauhdin Maailma
- Veikkaaja

== Technical magazines ==
- Forum
- iTurku Magazine
- Tekniikan Maailma

== University magazines ==
- Äpy
- Aviisi
- Julkku
- Kylteri
- Polyteekkari
- Tutkain
- Yliopisto
- Yliopistolainen

== Women's lifestyle magazines ==
- Anna
- Costume
- Eeva
- Gloria
- Jade
- Kauneus ja Terveys
- Me Naiset
- Naisten Ääni
- Nutid
- Olivia
- Om Konsten att Rätt Behaga
- Regina
- SARA
- Trendi
- Tulva

== Young adult magazines ==
- City
- Metropoli
- Papper
- V

== Youth's magazines ==
- Demi
- Hevoshullu
- Sinä&Minä
- Suosikki
- Villivarsa

== Others ==
- Aika
- Arkkitehti
- ET-lehti
- Fyren
- Kansa Taisteli
- Koti ja Yhteiskunta
- Kunta ja me
- Me-lehti
- Murikka
- Oma Aika
- OP
- Pirkka
- Rekyyli
- Retki
- Riista
- Rotary Norden
- Sää´mođđâz
- Sarjakuvalehti
- Softaaja
- Suomen Luonto
- Suomen Sotilas
- Tähtivaeltaja
- Trendi Veli
- Tuulispää
- Valvoja
- Yhteishyvä

== See also ==
- List of Finnish newspapers
- Media of Finland
