= Jan Erola =

Finnish journalist

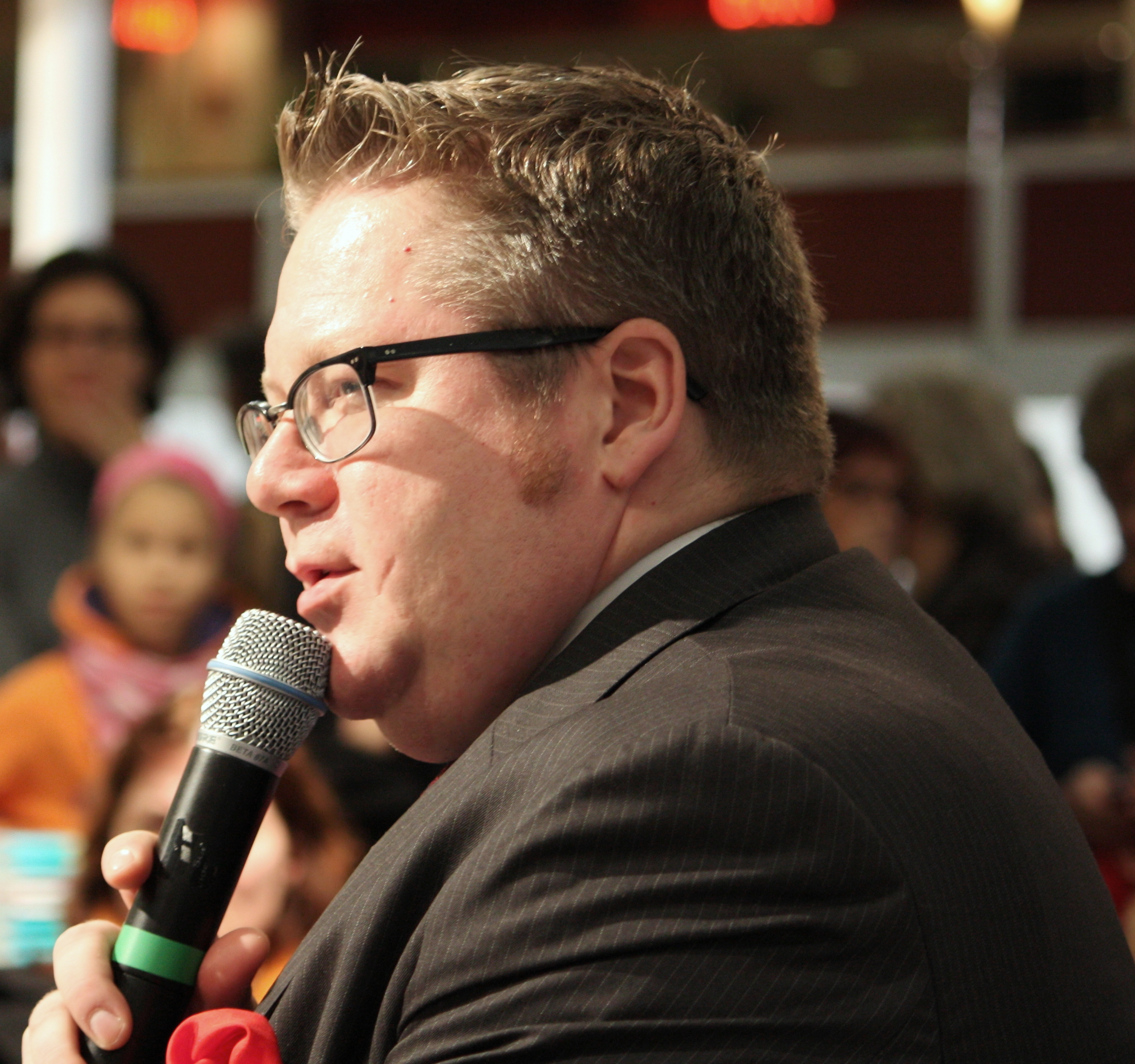
Jan Erola at the Helsinki Bookfair in 2010.

Jan Erola (born 20 November 1969) is a Finnish communications entrepreneur and former journalist and book publisher. Erola is the publisher of the online publication Nordic Defence Review and is also the CEO of his own Kravat Oy, a communications consultancy company. Since January 2000, he has appeared hundreds of times as a regular news commentator in the popular Jälkivisaat weekly news analysis section of Yleisradio's TV1 morning television.

== Career ==
Jan Erola is the CEO of Kravat Oy, a communications consultancy. He is also the publisher of Nordic Defence Review. Previously, he worked as a journalist, book publisher, and program director of the Helsinki Book Fair. Since January 2000, he has appeared as a regular news commentator in the Jälkivisaat program section of Yleisradio's morning television.

Erola also worked as the communications and marketing manager of Yellow Film & TV Ltd. From 2004 to 2009, Erola was the publishing manager of Ajatus Kirjat, a non-fiction imprint of Gummerus Publishers. Erola has worked as a CEO and publisher for Helsinki Books Ltd. One of biggest literary hits of Helsinki Books was Antti Tuomainen's crime novel Parantaja (The Healer), which went on to become a global success and has now been published in 26 countries. Erola was the program director of the Helsinki Book Fair 2016–2018. In 2018, the four-day fair had a then record number of attendees: 85 616.

He has worked as the publishing and communications manager for Paasilinna Publishing. Throughout his career at the three publishing houses, he published roughly 400 titles spanning both non-fiction and fiction genres.

As a journalist, Erola was a staff writer for Ylioppilaslehti, Iltalehti, Helsingin Sanomat and Talouselämä. He was the editor-in-chief of Ylioppilaslehti (1998-2000).

He is a columnist for Suomen Kuvalehti and has written columns for ET-lehti, Yleisradio's Radiomafia, Avotakka, Markkinointi & Mainonta, Metro (Finland edition), Valitut Palat, Me Naiset, Journalisti, and Helsingin Sanomat Sport pages. His blog, Kustantajan Kulma, focused on publishing.

Erola was a radio journalist and created content for Yleisradio Radio 1 and other Finnish TV shows. He has been a regular news commentator on the weekly YLE TV1 Morning program Jälkiviisaat (AKA In Hindsight) since 2000, appearing in hundreds of broadcasts.

Through his company Kravat Oy, Erola worked as the part-time Head of Public Affairs of the Finnish Startup Community, and has helped various startup companies with their funding and export efforts.

Kravat publishes the Nordic Defence Review. It has designed and published a professional networking tool software application HookedOn. Erola formerly worked as an associate director for Kreab, a multinational communications agency, for both the London and Helsinki offices. For several years, Erola was involved with the Sport and Healthtech startup event SMASH, e.g. by hosting the SMASH LONDON event in 2018.

== Personal life ==
Jan Erola has a Master of Social Sciences degree in recent/political history from Helsinki University. Born in Paddington, London, Erola has also lived in Oxford with his then wife Anne Moilanen and family. He sings and co-writes songs in a political history parody band, Punatähdet ("the Red Stars"), under the artist name of "Aatos Punanen.". Punatähdet sings mainly in Finnish, but has performed e.g. in Canada, in Sointula BC. Erola British vintage car enthusiast. He owns an old Mini and a Jaguar.

Erola is the vice chair of the advisory board of the Finnish National Theatre and a former member the board of the Finnish Society of Sport Sciences.
