= Pirkka =

Pirkka may refer to:

- Pirkka (name), Finnish male given name
- Pirkka (brand), private label brand of Finnish retailing cooperative Kesko
- Pirkka (magazine), Finnish customer magazine published by Kesko

== See also ==
- Birkarls, group that controlled Sámi taxation and commerce in Sweden from the 13th to the 17th century
- Pirkanmaa, region of Finland
