= Futari =

Futari may refer to:

- Futari (album), an album by Miwako Okuda
- "Futari" (song), a song by Jun Shibata
- Futari (magazine), a Finnish magazine
- Futari (people), a South American tribe
