= Riska (surname) =

Riska is a surname. Notable people with the surname include:

- Astrid Riska (1932–2010), Finnish organist
- Eddie Riska (1919–1992), American basketball player
- Erik Riska (born 1989), Finnish ice hockey player
- Filip Riska (born 1985), Finnish ice hockey player
- Kaj Riska (born 1953), Finnish naval architect and engineer

== See also ==
- Martin Riška (born 1975), Slovak racing cyclist
