= Tied =

Tied may mean:

- of a game, with the score equal or inconclusive, see Tie (draw)
- of goods, sold as a mandatory addition to another purchase, see Tying (commerce)
- of foreign aid, granted on the condition that it is spent in a given country, see Tied aid
- of a dwelling, rented in exchange for work, see Tied cottage
- of a pub, required to source from a given brewery, see Tied house
- of two musical notes, played as a single note, see Tie (music)
- of a knot, fastened
- of a person, wearing a necktie

== See also ==
- Tie (disambiguation)
- Tide (disambiguation)
- Tiede (disambiguation)
