= ATCF =

ATCF may refer to:

- Automated Tropical Cyclone Forecasting System, software used for forecasting tropical cyclones within United States agencies
- Automobile and Touring Club of Finland, with member magazine Moottori, the oldest automobile magazine in Finland
- Advanced Technology Combat Folder, a model of knife from Robert Terzuola
