= Vene =

Vene may refer to:

- Pterocarpus erinaceus, tree native to West Africa commonly known as vène
- Siim-Sander Vene (born 1990), Estonian basketball player for Hapoel Jerusalem of the Israeli Basketball Premier League
- Vene, Finnish boating magazine
- Vene means "Russian" in Estonian

== See also ==
- Veneküla, name of several villages (küla) in Estonia
