= Ydin =

Political magazine in Finland

- Editor-in-chief: Arja Alho
- Former editors: Pekka Peltola; Erkki Tuomioja
- Categories: Political magazine
- Frequency: Bi-monthly
- Founder: Ilkka Taipale
- Founded: 1966; 60 years ago
- Country: Finland
- Based in: Helsinki
- Language: Finnish
- Website: Ydin
- ISSN: 0356-357X
- OCLC: 478410586

Ydin (Finnish: nuclear, nucleus, core, crux) is a bi-monthly political magazine published in Helsinki, Finland.

== History and profile ==
Ydin was established by Ilkka Taipale in 1966. It was started as the official media outlet of the Committee of 100. The magazine is headquartered in Helsinki and focuses on political and societal news. In the 1960s Pekka Peltola was the editor of the magazine. Another former editor is Erkki Tuomioja who served in the post in the 1970s and 1980s. As of 2012 Arja Alho, former member of the Finnish parliament, was its editor-in-chief. Asa Butcher, co-editor of Ovi Magazine, is one of the editors of Ydin.

Ydin covers both national political events and foreign policy articles. The magazine was one of the contributors to the Capitalism ’09 event, an international activity to discuss contemporary capitalism, held in Helsinki on 23 April 2009.

== See also ==
- List of magazines in Finland
