= Erola =

Erola is a Finnish surname. Notable people with the surname include:

- Jan Erola (born 1969), Finnish journalist, communications consultant, and publisher
- Judy Erola (born 1934), Canadian politician
