= Fakta (disambiguation) =

Fakta is a Danish chain of discount stores.

Fakta may also refer to:

- Fakta (magazine), a Finnish business and professional magazine
- Bonnier Fakta, a subsidiary of the Swedish media group Bonnier Group
- Team Fakta, a Danish cycling team
- MTV Fakta and MTV Fakta XL, Finnish television channels
- TV4 Fakta and TV4 Fakta XL, Swedish television channels

== See also ==
- Facta (disambiguation)
