= Oho =

Oho or OHO may refer to:

- Oho!, Finnish entertainment magazine
- Ōhō (応保), Japanese era from 1161 to 1163
- Ōho (大保), Japanese location
- Oho, Japan, a village in Tsukuba District, Ibaraki
- Ōhō Kōnosuke, Japanese sumo wrestler
- Octahemioctahedron
- Okhotsk Airport (IATA code: OHO), airport in Russia
- Oho, an experiment at KEKB (accelerator)
- Hurricane Oho

== See also ==
- Ooho (disambiguation)
