= Ernst von Wendt =

Finnish journalist

Ernst Constantin Willehad von Wendt (2 November 1877, Helsinki - 30 September 1939) was a Finnish journalist, member of parliament and author who wrote in Swedish. He was the brother of the politician and professor Georg von Wendt and the lawyer Carl von Wendt.

== Biography ==
Ernst von Wendt was the son of Colonel Fredrik Willehad von Wendt and Baroness Fanny Elisabeth von Born, whose father was the politician Johan August von Born. After graduating from high school in 1896, he pursued university studies. He was a contributor to Hufvudstadsbladet from 1900 to 1906 and to the magazine Euterpe from 1902 to 1905. He was the editor-in-chief of Åbo Underrättelser from 1907 to 1918 and became editor-in-chief of Veckans krönika in 1920. He was also the Finland correspondent for several Stockholm newspapers, including as the Helsinki correspondent for Svenska Dagbladet.

Von Wendt participated in the Diet of 1904–1905 and 1905–1906 as a member of the nobility. In the first session he represented the Stierncrantz family by proxy and in the second session the von Haartman family. In 1918, he was the head of the military governor's office over Åland and from August to November of the same year, expert in the International Åland Commission (on the demolition of the Åland fortifications).

von Wendt published most of his works of fiction in the 1920s. His works are part of the early popular detective and adventure novels in Finnish-Swedish literature. His detective novels had a conservative political tone.

Ernst von Wendt was married three times, from 1906 to 1921 to Karin Fabritius, from 1921 to 1926 to Kerstin Maria Jacobsson and from 1930 to 1933 to Anna Elisabet Orest.

== Bibliography ==
=== Fiction ===
- Den indiska dosan ... ett politiskt fantasteri. Helsinki. 1922. SELIBR 3164314.
- Pensionatet Skogshyddan : historien om en yngre lektors sommarnöje, berättad av honom själv. Helsinki: Söderström. 1922. SELIBR 3053883.
- Segrare : en bok om två människoöden. Helsinki: Söderström. 1922.
- Emanuelssons på resa : en berättelse om gamla vänner och nya och om yngre lektorn. Helsinki: Söderström. 1923. SELIBR 3164307.
- I kamp mot dunkla makter : en finländsk brottmålsroman. Helsinki: Söderström. 1924. SELIBR 3164313.
- Fiendemakter i det fördolda : äventyrsroman mot verklighetens bakgrund. Helsinki: Söderström. 1926. Libris 3164308

=== Other ===
- Postfrågan : öfversikt intill 1899 .. : en utredning. Helsinki. 1905. SELIBR 3164320.
- När socialismen segrat : Eugen Richters "Socialdemokratiska framtidsbilder : fritt efter Bebel." : retuschering för finska förhållanden / af E.v.W. Turku. 1907. SELIBR 3164318.
- Åbo akademi-fråga : en relation och ett program : broschyren utarbetad på föranstaltande av Åbo akademi-komité. Turku. 1911. SELIBR 3164325. - Published anonymously.
- Finlands erövring och världspolitiken för hundra år sedan. Turku: Turku printing house and newspaper. 1913. SELIBR 2675924.
- Åländska spörsmål. Frågor för dagen, 99-0578548-5 ; 21. Helsinki. 1919. SELIBR 2837666.
- Den nya regimen vid Svenska teatern : en kritisk studie. Helsinki: Schildt. 1923. SELIBR 3164316.
- Ett politiskt aktstycke af september 1918 : en "P. M." jämte inramning. Helsinki. 1923. SELIBR 3164319.
- Svenskt och finskt i Finland. Helsinki. 1925. SELIBR 3164322. - From Svenska Dagbladet 1925-08-22.
- Carl Alex. Armfelt : en biografisk vy. Helsinki. 1926. SELIBR 3164305.
- En grotesk "Glozel-affär" för tvåhundra år sedan : ett sällsamt kapitel ur vetenskapsbedrägeriernas historia. Helsinki. 1928. SELIBR 3164312. - Concerning G. L. Hübers Lithographiae Wirceburgensis ... specimen primum. - From Finsk tidskrift.
- Där Fältskärns berättelser föddes : en miljö- och idé-studie. Helsinki. 1929. SELIBR 3164306. - From Lucifer.
- Ett märkligt konstverk i Mänttä-galleriet. Helsinki. 1930. SELIBR 3164315. - About Nedtagningen från korset en Roger van der Wyden-tavla i Gösta Serlachius-samlingen in Mänttä.
- Vi och vår framtid : festtal vid Svenska dagens högtidlighet i Tammerfors 6 november 1929. Helsinki. 1930. SELIBR 3164324.
- Salutorgets problem : huvudstadens främsta stadsbild och dess framtid : en studie i ord och bild. Helsinki. 1932. SELIBR 3164321.
- Från akademiplanernas första tider : erinringar till 25-årsdagen av akademimötet i Åbo den 12 januari 1908 och Åbo akademikommittés tillkomst. Helsinki. 1933. SELIBR 3164310. - From Finsk tidskrift.
- Samnordisk orientering. Nyköping: Södermanlands Läns Tidning. 1937. SELIBR 1381289. - From Södermanlands läns tidning 1936-07-24.
- Från lärdomssätet vid Auras strand till biskopssätet i Härnösand. Helsinki. 1938. SELIBR 3164311. - Extended special edition from Astra 18.6.1938.
- Tidigare skeden i Ålands befästningsfråga. [Viborg]. 1938. SELIBR 3164323.

=== As publisher ===
- Svenska skalders sånger till vinets lof. Helsinki: Hagelstam. 1902. SELIBR 2219259.
- Debatter och förhållanden vid representationsförändringen i Sverige 1865 : en sammanställning. Helsinki: Helios. 1906. SELIBR 2063082.
- Widerberg, Henriette (1924). Henriette Widerberg : "tonernas härskarinna,lidelsernas slav" : en skådespelerskas minnen / i redigering och med en levnadsteckning av Ernst von Wendt. Stockholm: Bonnier. SELIBR 284538.

=== Interpretations ===
- Kärlek och vår i Japan : japanska dikter i svensk omklädnad. Stockholm: Norstedt. 1925. SELIBR 1484259.
- Karkoff, Maurice (1986). Kärlek och vår i Japan : fem sånger för damröst, flöjt, klarinett, gitarr och slagverk : opus 161 / Maurice Karkoff ; japanska dikter i svensk omklädnad av Ernst von Wendt. Stockholm: Svensk Musik. SELIBR 3310915.
