= Leevi Lehto =

Finnish poet, translator, and programmer (1951–2019)

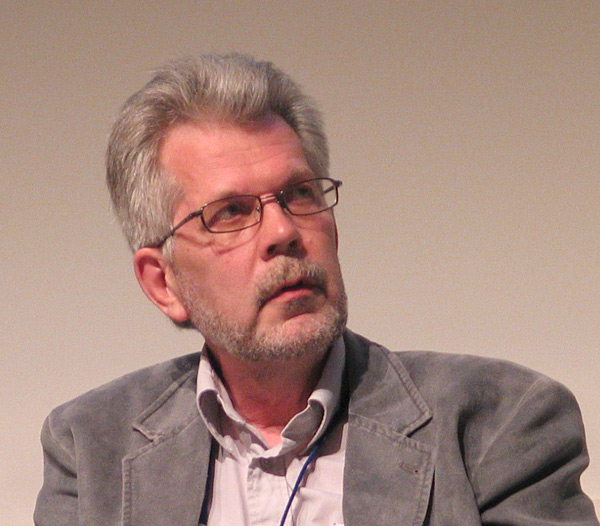
- Leevi Lehto at Writers' and Literary Translators' International Conference (Stockholm, June 2008)
- Born: 23 February 1951; Asikkala, Finland
- Died: 22 June 2019 (aged 68); Helsinki, Finland

Leevi Lehto (23 February 1951 – 22 June 2019) was a Finnish poet, translator, and programmer.

== Biography ==
After making his poetic debut in 1967, he published six volumes of poetry, a novel, Janajevin unet (Yanayev's Dreams, 1991), and an experimental prose work, Päivä (Day, 2004). He was active in leftist politics (during the 1970s) and worked as a corporate executive in communications industry (during the 1990s). He was also known for his experiments in digital writing, such as the Google Poem Generator. Furthermore he was an advocate of the concept of Barbaric English, an idea that all (non-English) languages influence the way English is spoken, making a non-native pronunciation of English an identifiable English dialect, similar to how New Zealand, Australian, Indian etc. pronunciations of English are termed dialects.

His translations, more than forty books in total, range from mystery writing to philosophy, sociology, and poetry, including work by Louis Althusser, Gilles Deleuze, George Orwell, Stephen King, Ian McEwan, Josef Skvorecky, Walter Benjamin, John Keats, John Ashbery, Mickey Spillane and Charles Bernstein. Among his translations (2006) was the new Finnish translation of Ulysses by James Joyce. 2020 post-humously his translation of John Keats "Autum and other poems" was awarded the Finnish translators' prize, Kääntäjäkarhulla (The Dancing Bear).

Lehto was the editor-in-chief of the poetry magazine Tuli & Savu between 2002 and 2003. He taught poetry at the Critical Academy (Kriittinen korkeakoulu) in Helsinki and was Chairman of the Planning Group for the yearly Helsinki Poetics Conference, member of the Planning Group for Kuopio Sound Poetry Seminar, responsible for the "poEsia" series of poetry books (Nihil Interit and Kirja kerrallaan), member of Editorial Council of Sibila, the Brazilian magazine of poetry, and contributing editor of US-based Electronic Poetry Center (EPC). Leevi Lehto's first volume of poetry in English, Lake Onega and Other Poems, was published by Salt Publishing in November 2006. Lehto's last collection of poetry, in Finnish, "Handy McCoystysen's Rakkauslaulu" (Handy McCoystysen's love song", he managed to see in print at his home in Helsinki on Midsummer's Eve, 2019. He died the next morning.

Lehto suffered from the aggressive multiple system atrophy for several years and died on 22 June 2019, aged 68.
