= Maailman Kuvalehti =

Finnish political magazine

- Editor-in-Chief: Anni Valtonen
- Categories: Magazine
- Frequency: Four times per year
- Publisher: Fingo
- First issue: 1985
- Company: Fingo
- Country: Finland
- Based in: Helsinki
- Language: Finnish
- Website: maailmankuvalehti.fi
- ISSN: 1799-151X
- OCLC: 1121047376

Maailman Kuvalehti (The World in Pictures) is a print magazine which is published by Fingo, an umbrella organization of development non-governmental organizations in Finland, four times a year.

The magazine publishes stories around the world, sheds light on the current phenomena and deepens the news stream. Respected writers and photographers from both Finland and abroad take part in creating the magazine.

Maailman Kuvalehti focuses on global and social issues. The magazine contains for example articles about daily life in developing countries and multicultural Finland. Major aim of the magazine is to improve awareness on developing countries. In the 2006 survey of the publisher it was founded that the readers were mostly positive about the stories on environmental issues, human rights and local cultures.

Maailman Kuvalehti is a member of the Finnish Magazine Media Association (Finnish: Aikakausmedia) and Kultti (The Association for Cultural, Scientific and Advocacy Magazines).

Since 2016 the editor-in-chief of Maailman Kuvalehti has been Anni Valtonen.

== History ==
Maailman Kuvalehti was formed in 1985 by Kepa, predecessor of Fingo. The magazine was formerly known as Kumppani (In English: Companion). The name was changed to Maailman Kuvalehti Kumppani (In English: World's Pictorial Magazine Companion) in 2009. It was further reported by Kepa that "Kumppani" would be eliminated from the title.

The magazine was previously published six times per year. In 2024, the print magazine appears four times. Maailman Kuvalehti has about 5,000 readers in print. In total, the magazine reaches more than 120,000 readers each year.

Maailman Kuvalehti has received multiple awards. For example, it has competed in the "Best magazine of the year" category in a competition for the Finnish magazines called Editkilpailu and received honorable mentions in 2017, 2018 and 2022. Also, the stories published in the magazine have received awards in Editkilpailu and many others.

== See also ==
- List of magazines in Finland
