= Kulttuurivihkot =

Finnish arts and political magazine

- Categories: Political magazine; Arts magazine
- Frequency: Bimonthly
- Publisher: Domirola Inc.
- Founded: 1973; 52 years ago
- Country: Finland
- Based in: Helsinki
- Language: Finnish
- Website: Kulttuurivihkot
- ISSN: 0356-3367
- OCLC: 9306855

Kulttuurivihkot (Finnish: Cultural notes) is a bimonthly left-wing political and arts magazine published in Helsinki, Finland. It has been in circulation since 1973.

== History and profile ==
Kulttuurivihkot was founded by a group linked to the Association for Cultural Workers in Finland in 1973. One of the founders was Juha Virkkunen, a Finnish journalist. He was also the founding editor-in-chief of the magazine. Kulttuurivihkot had a Marxist stance until 1991 when it became an independent left-wing magazine. It is published by Domirola Inc. on a bimonthly basis. The magazine covers articles on arts, cultural politics and ideologies from a left-wing perspective.

Kulttuurivihkot and the independent left, a political student organization at the University of Helsinki, have offered the Leonid Brezhnev peace prize since 2002. The prize was named after the Soviet Union leader Leonid Brezhnev. In 2002 the recipients of the award were George W. Bush, the US president, and Tony Blair, the prime minister of United Kingdom.

== See also ==
List of magazines in Finland
