= Taloustaito =

Finnish financial and business magazine

- Categories: Business magazine
- Frequency: Monthly
- Publisher: Verotieto Oy
- Founded: 1948
- Company: The Taxpayers Association of Finland
- Country: Finland
- Based in: Helsinki
- Language: Finnish
- Website: Taloustaito
- ISSN: 0788-9135
- OCLC: 925103268

Taloustaito is a monthly financial and business magazine published in Helsinki, Finland. The magazine has been in circulation since 1948.

== History and profile ==
Taloustaito is a publication of the Taxpayers Association of Finland. The magazine is sent to the members of the association and is published on a monthly basis in Helsinki by Verotieto Oy.

The monthly covers articles and news on personal finance, focusing on practical advice on taxes, family law, private investments, stocks and funds, insurance, housing, cars and property management.

== Circulation ==
In 2001 Taloustaito had a circulation of 192,000 copies. The circulation of the magazine was 209,000 copies in 2007. In 2009 it was the largest business magazine in Finland with a circulation of 236,000 copies.

Taloustaito had a circulation of 236,362 copies in 2010. The 2011 circulation of the monthly was 239,492 copies. In 2012 Taloustaito had a circulation of 242,250 copies, making it again the largest business magazine in the country.

== See also ==
- List of magazines in Finland
