= FACTA =

Facta may refer to:

- Fair and Accurate Credit Transactions Act, United States law passed in 2003
- FACTA (magazine), Japanese business journal
- FACTA+, a search engine for biomedical text mining
- Luigi Facta (1861–1930), Italian Prime Minister preceding Mussolini
- Facta (encyclopedia), Finnish encyclopedia
- Federal Anti-Car Theft Act of 1992 (FACTA)

== See also ==
- Foreign Account Tax Compliance Act (FATCA), United States law passed in 2010
- Fakta (disambiguation)
