= Suomen Luonto =

Finnish environmental magazine

- Editor: Heikki Vasamies
- Categories: Environmental
- Frequency: Monthly
- Publisher: Suomen luonnonsuojeluliitto
- Founded: 1941; 84 years ago
- Country: Finland
- Based in: Helsinki
- Language: Finnish
- Website: Suomen Luonto
- OCLC: 7368966

Suomen Luonto (meaning Nature of Finland in English) is Finland's largest nature magazine. It is headquartered in Helsinki. It is published by The Finnish Association for Nature Conservation. The magazine is a journalistically independent public magazine, the proceeds of which are used for the publisher's nature and environmental protection work. The magazine is published 10 times a year. Since 2016, the magazine's editor-in-chief has been Heikki Vasamies.

Suomen Luonto deals with current topics in nature and environment and delivers both news and in-depth articles about Finnish nature and also international subjects. It contains English language abstracts. The magazine is also available in public libraries.

== History and profile ==
Suomen Luonto was established in 1941. It is published by Suomen luonnonsuojeluliitto (The Finnish Association for Nature Conservation). It was first published as a yearbook, but in 1956 it changed to a magazine published four times a year. In the 1960s, environmental topics began to be included, and they were sometimes addressed in such a heated tone that, for example, forest professionals left the union. In 1971, the magazine became a subscription magazine, and was no longer part of the association's membership fee.

By 2022 Suomen Luonno had 155,000 readers according to the National Media Research and its total reach, including digital, amounted to 193,000 people. The magazine's social media channels had a total of over 200,000 followers.

Suomen Luonto won the Quality Magazine of the Year award in 2011. Suomen Luonno's articles have been awarded in Aikakausmedia's Edit competition for several years[6]. In 2020, the magazine had received, for example, the photo reportage award of the year, and the lifestyle story award of the year in 2017..

Since 2000, Lehti has organized the annual Vanity of the Year competition.

== See also ==
List of magazines in Finland
