= Det Bästa =

Swedish general interest magazine

- Categories: General interest magazine
- Frequency: Monthly
- Founded: 1943
- First issue: March 1943
- Country: Sweden
- Based in: Stockholm
- Language: Swedish
- Website: www.readersdigest.se
- ISSN: 1100-4843
- OCLC: 185269465

Det Bästa (Swedish: The Best) is the Swedish edition of the American Reader's Digest magazine. It has been in circulation since 1943. Its subtitle is världens mest lästa tidskrift (Swedish: the world's most read magazine).

== History and profile ==
Det Bästa was first published in March 1943 and is affiliated with the American magazine Reader's Digest. Barclay Acheson, director of the international editions of Reader's Digest, involved in the establishment of the magazine in Sweden. Det Bästa comes out monthly and is headquartered in Stockholm. Its publisher was Reader's Digest AB between 1989 and 1998 when the company was renamed as Det Beste AB.

Det Bästa is a news and general interest digest. The magazine had covered materials from its parent publication, Reader's Digest, until 2008 when it was redesigned to expand its content. Its editor-in-chief was Anna-Karin Rabe during this period.

During the Cold War period the Finnish-Soviet Union Association claimed that both Det Bästa and Valitut Palat, Finnish edition of Reader's Digest, were two major anti-Soviet propaganda tools in Finland.
