= Ilkka Taipale =

Finnish politician (born 1942)

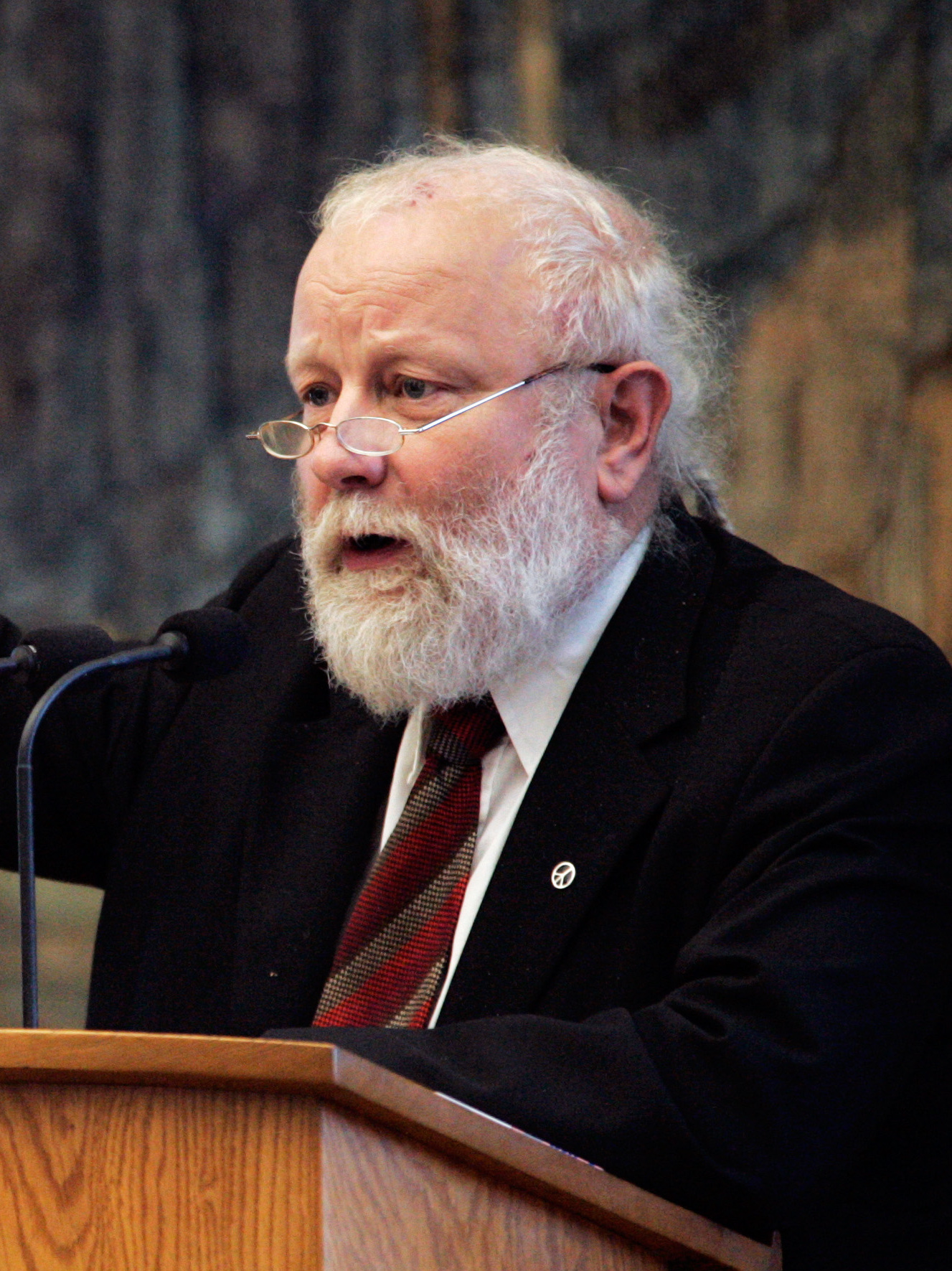
Ilkka Taipale in 2006

Väinö Ilkka Ilari Taipale (born 29 November 1942 in Helsinki) is a Finnish politician, physician and activist. A social democrat, he was a member of the Parliament of Finland for Helsinki from 1971 to 1975 and 2000 to 2007.

A doctor and surgeon by education, Taipale worked as a physician at several hospitals. He is also a docent of social medicine at University of Tampere.

Taipale has been active in many pacifist organisations and other governmental and non-governmental organisations. In 1966 he launched a political magazine, Ydin.

He is married, with four children, to fellow physician and politician, Vappu Taipale.
