= Kaj Riska =

Finnish naval architect and engineer

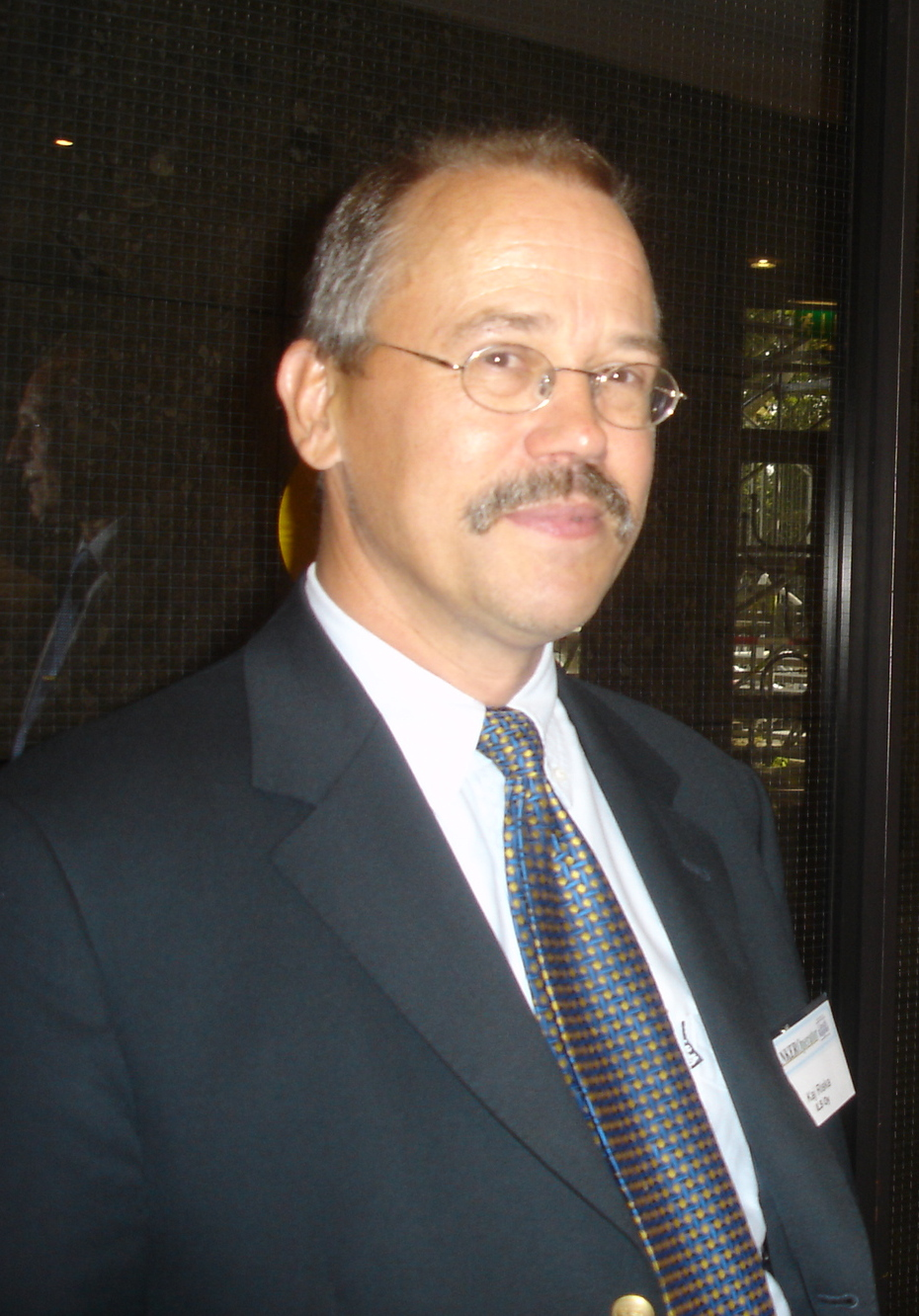
- Riska in 2006, Digital Ship conference, Hamburg
- Born: Kaj Antero Riska; January 25., 1953; Helsinki, Finland
- Education: Helsinki University of Technology
- Spouse: Pirjo Hannele Riska (née Nieminen)
- Children: Mats Nikolas (1985) and Jens Mikael (1989)
- Engineering career
- Discipline: Naval architecture, arctic technology
- Institutions: ISO, POAC, IMO, ITTC, PolarTech, ISSC
- Practice name: Kaj Riska

Kaj Antero Riska (born January 25, 1953, Helsinki, Finland) is a naval architect and engineer with expertise in ice and arctic technology. He has written various publications about ice-going ships and icebreaker design, ice loads and ice management for arctic offshore floating platforms. He worked at Total S.A. as Senior Ice Engineer. He received the 2019 POAC Founders Lifetime Achievement Award.

== Education and career ==
Kaj Riska graduated from the Helsinki University of Technology (TTK) (Finnish: Teknillinen korkeakoulu) in Naval Architecture as M.Sc. in 1978 and D.Sc. in 1988. He worked at the Technical Research Centre of Finland from 1977 to 1988 as the group leader for Arctic Marine Technology. From 1989 to 1991 he was a senior researcher for the Academy of Finland. From 1992 to 1995 he was the director of Arctic Offshore Research Centre and from 1995 to 2005 the professor of Arctic Marine Technology at the Helsinki University of Technology.

Since 2005 he has been a partner of the company ILS Oy and since 2006 Professor at the Norwegian University of Science and Technology (NTNU) in Trondheim, Norway. He and his Ph.D. students were investigating the models to describe the ice action on ships and their application in various ship design aspects.

=== Exams ===
Kaj Riska passed his student exam (upper secondary school) at Helsingin Yhtenäiskoulu in May 1972. He received his Master of Science degree in naval architecture in June 1978 and his Doctor in Technology degree in September 1988, both issued by the Helsinki University of Technology.

=== Previous professional experience ===
From 1974 and up to 2005, Kaj Riska worked at many academic institutions as researcher or professor. These experiences can be summarized as follow:

- TKK, Laboratory of Mechanics: assistant to professor.
- Technical Research Centre of Finland, Ship Laboratory: research assistant, research scientist, senior research scientist and head of division.
- TKK, Laboratory of Naval Architecture and Marine Engineering: senior research scientist.
- Academy of Sciences in Finland: senior fellow.
- TKK, Arctic Offshore Research Centre: Director.
- TKK, Ship Laboratory: acting professor and Professor in Arctic Marine Technology.

Also, he has been giving lectures at TKK, Laboratory of Naval Architecture and Marine Engineering in ship vibrations, winter navigation and marine technology. He worked as Project Manager from 1989 to 1992 in the same laboratory.

In 2005, Kaj Riska joined ILS Ltd as Senior Naval Architect and partner. ILS Lts is an independent, private owned consulting and engineering company, specialized in ship design and especially in ship project evaluation and basic design. In 2012, Riska left ILS Ltd to join Total S.A.

=== Present activities ===
Since 2012, Kaj Riska is working at the supermajor Total in Paris as Senior ice engineer. Total is positioned on two large-scale projects in the Arctic: Shtokman and Yamal LNG, both in the Russian Arctic Shelf.
Riska is Professor II at the University of Science and Technology of Trondheim, Norway, since 2006

== Influence ==
Kaj Riska is a key person in the Arctic Technology area. His works are key references for ISO standards (ISO 19906) and Rules of Classification of ice-going ships. He is an active member of many organizations.

=== Scientific activities ===
- PolarTech (member of the standing committee since 1991)
- Conference of Port and Ocean Engineering under Arctic Conditions (POAC) (member of the international committee since 1990, chairman 1998-2000)
- Society of Structural Mechanics (secretary 1984-85, chairman 1996-2001)
- The Association of Finnish Metal Industries, Shipbuilding group, R & D committee (member and secretary, 1985-1998)
- 11th and 12th International Ship & Offshore Structures Congress (ISSC) (member of committee I.2 1988-1994, chairman of ice-structure interaction committee 1994-2000)
- 20th International Towing Tank Conference (ITTC) (member of performance in ice-covered waters committee 1990-1993, chairman 1993-1996)
- The Board of the Maritime Institute of Finland (member 1994-1999)
- The Finnish Polar Council (member 1994-1999)
- International Journal of Polar Engineering and Offshore Mechanics (associate-editor 1995-1998)
- Oceanic Engineering International - journal (associate-editor 1996-1999)
- Specific Committee for European Union scientific programme MAST (Marine Science and Technology) (national delegate 1997-1998)
- European Association of Universities in Marine Technology and Related Sciences (member of the executive committee 2001-2004)
- European Shipbuilders Association (CESA), the R&D working group of CESA (COREDES) (scientific adviser 2003-2005)
- The Maritime Institute of Finland (chairman of the board 2004)
- Expert Pilot Panel of IMO on developing the GBS (member 2007-2008)

=== Partial list of project management ===
- Expert for the Finnish Transport Safety Agency in developing the ice class correction factors for EEDI at IMO/MEPC, since 2009
- Expert in developing the Finnish-Swedish ice class rules for the Finnish and Swedish Maritime Administrations, since 1995
- Updating the performance requirements of the Finnish-Swedish ice class rules, technical background, The Finnish Maritime Administration, since 1993
- Coordinator of the EC-funded project SAFEICE (Increasing the Safety of Icebound Shipping), 2004 – 2005
- Expert for the Finnish Maritime Administration in the EC-funded PHARE-project Strengthening Enforcement of Maritime Safety, a twinning project between Estonia and Finland, 2003 - 2005
- Coordinator of the EC-funded project IRIS (Ice ridging information for decision making in shipping operations), 2003 – 2005
- Member of the ad hoc IACS working group to develop the harmonized polar rules, 1993 – 2001
- Evaluation of design ice loads of a FPSU operating in the Bohai Bay, 1997-1999, The China Offshore Oil Bohai Corporation and the Finnish Ministry of Trade and Industry.
- Coordinator of the EC-funded MAST III project ICE STATE concerned with modelling and remote sensing of the ice cover, 1996-1999
- Safety of RORO vessels, ship collision risks in the Finnish waters and external collision dynamics, 1996. International joint industry project coordinated by Det norske Veritas.
- Ice interaction with the Bohai Bay production station, 1992, China Offshore Oil Design and Engineering Corporation.
- Model tests to design the Finnish multipurpose icebreaker, 1991–92, The Board of Navigation and Finnyards.
- Ice expedition to the Pechora Sea, winter 1992. Offshore Industry Group in Finland.
- Ice expedition to the Okhotsk Sea, winter 1990 and 1991. Offshore Industry Group in Finland.
- Ice load evaluations for the various production platform concepts for the Shtockmanovskoye gas field, 1990, Wärtsilä Project Export, 2000, Fortum.
- Ice load on ships in realistic ice conditions, 1989 - 1993, jointly with National Research Council of Canada. The Joint Research Project Arrangement No. 5 (JRPA V) between Finland and Canada.
- Theoretical modelling of ship/ice interaction, 1987 - 1990. The Technology Development Centre of Finland.
- Physical modelling of ship/ice interaction, 1986 - 1989, jointly with Canadian Coast Guard. The Joint Research Project Arrangement No. 3 (JRPA III) between Finland and Canada.
- Ice load penetration model, 1985 - 1987, jointly with National Research Council of Canada. The Joint Research Project Arrangement No. 1 (JRPA I) between Finland and Canada.
- Estimation of ice loading and strength of shell structure of MV Arctic, 1983, Canadian Coast Cuard.
- Statistical measurement of wave and ice loads on MV Arctic in the Canadian Arctic and North Atlantic, 1982, Canadian Coast Guard.
- Measurement of ice loads on Canmar Kigoriak in the Beaufort Sea August and October, 1981, Dome Petroleum.

== Publications ==
=== Theses ===
1. Riska, K. 1978. On the Application of Macroscopic Failure Criteria on Columnar-Grained Ice. M.Sc. Thesis, Helsinki University of Technology, Department of General Sciences, Otaniemi 1978. 71 p. (in Finnish)
2. Riska, K. 1978. On the Mechanics of the Ramming Interaction between a Ship and a Massive Ice Floe. Technical Research Centre of Finland, Publications 43, Espoo, 1987, 86 p.

=== Scientific publications ===
1. Riska, K. & Varsta, P. 1977. State-of-Art Review of Basic Ice Problems for a Naval Architect. Espoo 1977, VTT Ship Laboratory, Report No. 2, 63 p.
2. Riska, K. & Varsta, P. 1977. Failure Process of Ice Edge Caused by Impact with Ships Side. Symposium in connection with 100 Years Celebration of Finnish Winter Navigation, Oulu, Finland, December 16–17, 1977. Publ. Board of Navigation, Helsinki 1979, pp. 235–262.
3. Riska, K. 1980. On the Role of Failure Criterion of Ice in Determining Ice Loads. Espoo 1980, VTT Ship Laboratory, Report No. 7. 31 p.
4. Enkvist, E. & Varsta, P. & Riska, K. 1979. The Ship-Ice Interaction. POAC 1979, Proceedings, vol. 2, Trondheim, August 13–18, 1979, pp. 977–1002.
5. Vuorio, J. & Riska, K. & Varsta, P.1979. Long Term Measurements of Ice Pressure and Ice-Induced Stresses on the Icebreaker SISU in Winter 1978. Helsinki 1979, Winter Navigation Research Board, Report No. 28, 50 p.
6. Riska, K. & Kujala, P. & Vuorio, J. 1983. Ice Load and Pressure Measurements onboard I.B. SISU. POAC 1983, Proceedings, Vol. 2, Helsinki, April 5–9, 1983, pp. 1055–1069.
7. Nyman, T. & Riska, K. 1984. The Level Ice Resistance - Ideas Stemming from the Model and Full Scale Tests. VTT Symposium 52, Ship Strength and Winter Navigation, Espoo, January 10–11, 1984, pp. 183–200.
8. Kujala, P. & Riska, K. 1983. Evaluation of Some Factors Influencing Material Selection for Arctic Vessels. Proceedings of the Study Session on Fracture Toughness Evaluation of Steels for Arctic Marine Use, October 1983, Ottawa, Canada, Publ. Physical Metallurgy Research Laboratories MRP/PMRL 83-72 (OP-J), pp. 3/1-3/27.
9. Riska, K. & Frederking, R. 1987. Ice Load Penetration Modelling. POAC 1987, proceedings, Vol. 1, Fairbanks, Alaska, August 17–21, 1987, pp. 317–328.
10. Riska, K. 1989. An Analysis of Factors Influencing Ship Response in Collision with Multi-Year Ice Floes. POAC 1989, Proceedings, Vol. 2, Luleå, June 12–16, 1989, pp. 750–763.
11. Riska, K. 1991. Theoretical Modelling of Ice-Structure Interaction. S. Jones & R.McKenna & J. Tillotson & I. Jordaan (Eds.): Ice-Structure Interaction. IUTAM-IAHR Symposium, St. John's, Newfoundland, Canada, Springer-Verlag, Berlin,1991, pp. 595 – 618.
12. Kujala, P. & Riska, K. & Varsta, P. & Koskivaara, R. & Nyman, T. 1990. Results from In-Situ Four Point Bending Tests with Baltic Sea Ice. IAHR Symposium on Ice 1990, Proceedings, Vol. 1, Espoo, Finland, August 20–24, 1990, pp. 261–278.
13. Veitch, B. & Lensu, M. & Riska, K. & Kosloff, P. & Keiley, P. & Kujala, P. 1991. Field Observations of Ridges in the Northern Baltic Sea. 11th International Conference on Port and Ocean Engineering under Arctic Conditions (POAC), Proceedings, Vol 1, St. John's, Canada, September 24–28, 1991, pp. 381 – 400.
14. Riska, K. 1991. Observations of the Line-like Nature of Ship-Ice Contact. 11th International Conference on Port and Ocean Engineering under Arctic Conditions, Proceedings, Vol 2, St. John's, Canada, September 24–28, 1991, pp. 785 – 811.
15. Kujala, P. & Varsta, P. & Riska, K. 1993. Full-Scale Observations of Ship Performance in Ice. The 12th International Conference on Port and Ocean Engineering under Arctic Conditions, 17–20 August 1993, Hamburg, Germany, pp. 209–218.
16. Soininen, H. & Nyman, T. & Riska, K. & Lohi, P. & Harjula, A. 1993. The Ice Capability of the Multipurpose Icebreaker FENNICA - Full-Scale Results. The 12th Int. Conference on Port and Ocean Engineering under Arctic Conditions (POAC), 17–20 August 1993, Hamburg, Germany, pp. 259–271.
17. Riska, K. & Baarman, L. 1993. A Model for Ice Induced Vibration of Slender Offshore Structures. The 12th International Conference on Port and Ocean Engineering under Arctic Conditions (POAC), 17–20 August 1993, Hamburg, Germany, pp. 578–594.
18. Nortala-Hoikkanen, A. & Riska, K. & Salmela, O. & Wilkman, G. 1993. Methods to Map Ice Conditions, to Measure Ice Properties and to Quantify Ice Features. The 12th International Conference on Port and Ocean Engineering under Arctic Conditions (POAC), 17–20 August 1993, Hamburg, Germany, pp. 921–935.
19. Riska, K. & Bo, Z.C. & Saarikoski, R. 1993. Structure-Ice Interaction for a Bohai Bay Oil Production Project. Sea Ice Symposium, 19–21 October 1993, Beijing, China, pp. 230–246.
20. Riska, K. 1993. Prediction of Ice Action on Offshore Structures. Sea Ice Symposium, 19–21 October 1993, Beijing, China, pp. 207–221.
21. Riska, K. & Jalonen, R. & Veitch, B. & Nortala-Hoikkanen, A. & Wilkman, G. 1994. Assessment of Ice Model Testing Techniques. IceTech '94, 15–18 March 1994, Paper F.
22. Riska, K. & Kukkanen, T. 1994. Speed Dependence of the Natural Modes of an Elastically Scaled Ship Model. Proc. of the Int. Conf. on Hydroelasticity in Marine Tech., 25–27 May 1994, Trondheim, Norway, pp. 157–168.
23. Tuhkuri, J. & Riska, K. 1994. Experimental Investigations on Extrusion of Crushed Ice. IAHR 94, Proc. of the 12th Int. Symp. on Ice, 23–26 August 1994, Trondheim, Norway, Vol. 1, pp. 474–483.
24. Hautaniemi, H. & Oksama, M. & Multala, J. & Leppäranta, M. & Riska, K. & Salmela, O. 1994. Airborne Electromagnetic Mapping of Ice Thickness in the Baltic Sea. IAHR 94, Proc of the 12th Int. Symp. on Ice, 23–26 August 1994, Trondheim, Norway, Vol. 2, pp. 530–539.
25. Riska, K. 1995. Models of Ice-Structure Contact for Engineering Applications. In Mechanics of Geo-material Interfaces, eds. A.P.S. Selvadurai & M.J. Boulon, Elsevier Science B.V., 1995, pp. 77–103.
26. Riska, K. & Kujala, P. & Goldstein, R. & Danilenko, V. & Osipenko, N. 1995. Application of Results from the Research Project 'A Ship in Compressive Ice' to Ship Operability. The 13th International Conference on Port and Ocean Engineering under Arctic Conditions (POAC), 15–18 August 1995, Murmansk, Russia.
27. Lensu, M. & Heale, S. & Riska, K. & Kujala, P. 1996. Ice Environment and Ship Hull Loading along the NSR. INSROP Working Paper No. 66 - 1996, I.1.10.
28. Multala, J. & Hautaniemi, H. & Oksama, M. & Leppäranta, M. & Riska, K. & Lensu, M. 1996. An Airborne Electromagnetic System on a Fixed Wing Aircraft for Sea Ice Thickness Mapping. Cold Regions Science and Technology, no. 24, 1996, pp. 355 – 373.
29. Li Zhijun & Riska, K. 1996. On the Measuring Methods of Physical and Mechanical Properties for Fine Granular Ethanol Model Ice. Proc. of the fifth Chinese National Glaciology and Geocryology Conference, Ganshu Cultural Place, China, Vol. I, 1996, pp. 565 – 571. [in Chinese].
30. Riska, K. 1997. Determination of the Stress Field around a Whole in a Plate. Journal of Structural Mechanics, Vol. 30, 1997, No. 2, pp. 18 – 39. (in Finnish).
31. Daley, C. & Tuhkuri, J. & Riska, K. 1998: The Role of Discrete Failures in Local Ice Loads. Cold Regions Science and Technology, 27(1998), pp. 197–211.
32. Riska, K. & Wilhelmson, M. & Englund, K. & Leiviskä, T. 1998: Performance of Merchant Vessels in Ice in the Baltic. Winter Navigation Research Board, Research Report No. 52, Helsinki 1998, 72 p.
33. Tuhkuri, J. & Lensu, M. & Riska, K. & Sandven, S. & Thorkildsen, F. & Haapala, J. & Leppäranta, M. & Doble, M. & Alsenov, Y. & Wadhams, P. & Erlingson, B. 1998. Local Ice Cover Deformation and Mesoscale Ice Dynamics "Ice State". Third European Marine Science and Technology Conference, Lisbon, 23–27 May 1998, Proc. Vol. I, pp. 315–328.
34. Li, Zhijun & Riska, K. 1998. Characteristic Length and Strain Modulus of the Fine Grain Ethanol Model Ice. Marine Environmental Science, 17(1998)4, pp. 42–47 [in Chinese].
35. Li, Zhijun & Riska, K. 1998. Experimental Study on the Uniaxial Compressive Strength Characteristics of Fine Grain Ethanol Model Ice. Journal of Glaciology and Geocryology, 20(1998)2, pp. 167–171 [in Chinese].
36. Li, Zhijun & Riska, K. 1998. Uniaxial Compressive Strength of Fine Grain Ethanol Model Ice. Ice in Surface Waters, Proc. of the IAHR Ice Symposium, ed. H-T. Shen, Balkema, Holland, pp. 547–552.
37. Riska, K. & Daley, C. 1999. Harmonization of Polar Class Ship Rules. Structural Design '98, Seminar, Espoo, Finland, 26 March 1998. Proc. Ed. P. Kujala, Helsinki University of Technology, Ship Laboratory, Report M-238, Espoo 1999, pp. 41–56.
38. Riska, K. & Tuhkuri, J. 1999. Analysis of Contact between Level Ice and a Structure. Proc. of the International Workshop on RATIONAL EVALUATION OF ICE FORCES ON STRUCTURES, 2–4 February 1999, Mombetsu, Japan, pp. 103–120.
39. Patey, M. & Riska, K. 1999. Simulation of Ship Transit through Ice. INSROP Working Paper No. 155 - 1999. The Fridtjof Nansen Institute, Norway, 57 p.
40. Nyman, T., Riska, K., Soininen, H., Lensu, M., Jalonen, R., Lohi, P. & Harjula, A. 1999. The Ice Capability of the Multipurpose Icebreaker Botnica – Full Scale Results. The 15th International Con-ference on Port and Ocean Engineering under Arctic Conditions (POAC99), 23–27 August 1999, Otaniemi, Finland, pp. 631–643.
41. Riska, K., Patey, M., Kishi, S. & Kamesaki, K. 2001. Influence of Ice Conditions on Ship Transit Times in Ice. The 16th International Conference on Port and Ocean Engineering under Arctic Condi-tions (POAC), 12–17 August 2001, Ottawa, Canada, pp. 729–746.
42. Riska, K., Leiviskä, T., Nyman, T., Fransson, L., Lehtonen, J., Eronen, H. & Backman, A. 2001. Ice Performance of the Swedish Multi-purpose Icebreaker Tor Viking II. The 16th International Con-ference on Port and Ocean Engineering under Arctic Conditions (POAC), 12–17 August 2001, Ottawa, Canada, pp. 849–866.
43. Leiviskä, T., Tuhkuri, J. & Riska, K. 2001. Model Tests on Resistance in Ice-Free Ice Channels. The 16th International Conference on Port and Ocean Engineering under Arctic Conditions (POAC), 12–17 August 2001, Ottawa, Canada, pp. 881–890.
44. Iyerusalimski, A., Riska, K. & Minnick, P. 2001: USCGC Healy Ice trials Trafficability Program. The 16th International Conference on Port and Ocean Engineering under Arctic Conditions (POAC), 12–17 August 2001, Ottawa, Canada, pp. 917–920.
45. St. John, J., Tunik, A., Riska, K. & Sheinberg, R. 2001: Forward Shoulder Ice Impact Loads during the USCGC Healy Ice Trials. The 16th International Conference on Port and Ocean Engineering under Arctic Conditions (POAC), 12–17 August 2001, Ottawa, Canada, pp. 965–968.
46. Riska, K. & Uto, S. & Tuhkuri, J. 2002: Pressure Distribution and Response of Multiplate Panels under Ice Loading. Cold Regions Science and Technology, 34(2002), pp. 209–225.
47. Riska, K. & Lohi, P. & Eronen, H. 2005: The Width of the Channel Achieved by an Azimuth Thruster Icebreaker. The 17th International Conference on Port and Ocean Engineering under Arctic Conditions (POAC), June 26–30, 2005, Vol. 2, pp. 647 – 662.
48. Jalonen, R. & Riska, K. & Hänninen, S. 2005: A Preliminary Risk Analysis of Winter Navigation in the Baltic Sea. Winter Navigation Research Board, Research Report No 57, Helsinki, 206 p.
49. Riska, K. & Breivik, K. & Eide, S.I. & Gudmestad, O. 2006: Factors Influencing the Development of Routes for Regular Oil Transport from Dikson. Proc. ICETECH’06, Banff, Canada, Paper 153RF, 7 p.
50. Bridges, R. & Riska, K. & Zhang, S. 2006: Preliminary Results of Investigation on the Fatigue of Ship Hull Structures when Navigating in Ice. Proc. ICETECH’06, Banff, Canada, Paper 142 RF, 4 p.
51. Wang, Ge & Liu, S. & Riska, K. 2006: Recent Advances in Structural Design of Ice-Strengthened Vessels. Proc. ICETECH’06, Banff, Canada, Paper 127 RF, 8 p.
52. Pärn, O. & Haapala, J. & Kouts, T. & Elken, J. & Riska, K. 2007: On the Relationship between Sea Ice Deformation and Ship Damages in the Gulf of Finland in Winter 2003. Proc. Estonian Acad. Sci. Eng. Vol. 13, No. 3, 2007
53. Tikka, K., Riska, K. & Liu, S. 2008: Tanker Design Considerations for Safety and Environmental Protection of Arctic Waters: Learning from Past Experience. WMU Journal of Maritime Affairs, Vol. 7 (2008), No. 1, pp. 189–204.
54. Eriksson, P., Haapala, J., Heiler, I., Leisti, H., Riska, K. & Vainio, J. 2009: Ships in Compressive Ice – Description and Operative Forecasting of Compression in an Ice Field. Winter Navigation Research Board, Research Report No. 59, Finnish and Swedish Maritime Administrations, 43 p.
55. Kujala, P., Suominen, M. & Riska, K. 2009: Statistics of Ice Loads Measured on MT Uikku in the Baltic. Proc. of the 20th International Conf. on Port and Ocean Engineering under Arctic Conditions (POAC09), June 9–12, Luleå, Sweden.
56. Su, B., Riska, K. & Moan, T. 2010: A numerical method for the prediction of ship performance in level ice. Cold Regions Science and Technology 60 (2010), pp. 177–188.
57. Su, B., Riska, K. & Moan, T. 2010: Numerical Simulation of Ship Turning in Ice. 29th International Conference on Ocean, Offshore and Arctic Engineering (OMAE2010), June 6–11, 2010, Shanghai, China, pp. 783–792.
58. Suyuthi, A., Leira, B. & Riska, K. 2010: Variation of the Short Term Extreme Ice Loads Along a Ship Hull. 29th International Conference on Ocean, Offshore and Arctic Engineering (OMAE2010), June 6–11, 2010, Shanghai, China, pp. 783–792.
59. Su, B., Riska, K. & Moan, T. 2011: Numerical Simulation of Local Ice Loads in Uniform and Randomly Varying Ice Conditions. Cold Regions Science and Technology 65(2011), pp. 145–159.
60. Su, B., Riska, K. & Moan, T. 2011: Numerical Study of Ice-Induced Loads on Ship Hulls. Marine Structures (in press).
61. Riska, K. & Coche, E. 2013: Station keeping in ice - Challenges and possibilities. Proc. of the 22nd International Conf. on Port and Ocean Engineering under Arctic Conditions (POAC13), June 2013, Espoo, Finland.

=== Laboratory work ===
1. Riska, K. & Frederking, R. 1985. Constituents for Structure-Ice Interaction Modelling. Joint Research Project Arrangement I, Ice Load Penetration Model, Report 1, National Research Council of Canada and Technical Research Centre of Finland, 1985, 34 p.
2. Riska, K. & Frederking, R. 1987. Modelling Ice Load during Penetration into Ice. Joint Research Project Agreement I, Ice Load Penetration Model, Report 2, National Research Council of Canada and Technical Research Centre of Finland, 1987, 57 p. + 18 app.
3. Riska, K. & Daley, C. 1986. M.V. Arctic ramming Model Test results. Joint Research Project Arrangement III, Physical Modelling of Ship/Ice Interaction, Report 1, Transport Canada and Technical Research Centre of Finland, 1986, 54 p. + 43 app.
4. Riska, K. 1988. Ship Ramming Multi-Year Ice Floes, Model Test Results. Technical Research Centre of Finland, Research Notes 818, Espoo, 1988, 67 p. + 47 app.
5. Riska, K. 1988. Ship/Ice Interaction, Prestudy and Research Plan. Helsinki University of Technology, Lab. of Naval Architecture and Marine Eng., Report M-81, Espoo, 1988, 39 p (in Finnish).
6. Muhonen, A. & Riska, K. 1988. Impact of a Landing Craft Bow on a Presawn Level Ice Edge, Results from the First Model Test Series 3-8-12-1987. Helsinki University of Technology, Lab. of Naval Architecture and Marine Engineering, Report M-84, Espoo, 1988, 30 p.+ 169 app. (in Finnish)
7. Joensuu, A. & Riska, K. 1989. Structure/Ice Contact, Measurement Results from the joint Tests with Wärtsilä Arctic research Centre in Spring 1988. Helsinki University of Technology, Lab. of Naval Architecture and Marine Eng., Report M-88, Espoo, 1989, 57 p. + 154 app. (in Finnish)
8. Gyldén, R. & Riska, K. 1989. Ice Load Measurements onboard MS Kemira, Winter 1989. Helsinki University of Technology, Lab. of Naval Architecture and Marine Eng., Report M-93, Espoo, 1989, 13 p. + 49 app.
9. Riska, K. & Kämäräinen, J. & Hänninen, M. 1990. Ice Impact Model Tests for Three Bow Forms of a Vessel. Helsinki University of Technology, Lab. of Naval Architecture and Marine Eng., Report M-96, Espoo, 1990, Vol. 1, 141 p. + 24 app., Vol 2, 374 p.
10. Riska, K. & Rantala, H. & Joensuu, A. 1990. Full Scale Observations of Ship-Ice Contact. Helsinki University of Technology, Lab. of Naval Architecture and Marine Eng., Report M-97, Espoo, 1990, 54 p. + 293 app.
11. Tuhkuri, J. & Riska, K. 1990. Results from Tests on Extrusion of Crushed Ice. Helsinki University of Technology, Lab. of Naval Architecture and Marine Eng., Report M-98, Espoo, 1990, 47 p. + 33 app.
12. Lindholm, J.-E. & Riska, K. & Joensuu, A. 1990. Contact between Structure and Ice, Results from Ice Crushing Tests with Flexible Indentor. Helsinki University of Technology, Lab. of Naval Architecture and Marine Eng., Report M-101, Espoo, 1990, 30 p. + 117 app.
13. Daley, C. & Riska, K. 1990. Review of Ship-Ice Interaction Mechanics. Helsinki University of Technology, Lab. of Naval Architecture and Marine Eng., Report M-102, Espoo, 1990, 120 p.
14. Riska, K. 1991. Prestudy on the navigation in the Saimaa lake area. Helsinki University of Technology, Lab. of Naval Architecture and Marine Engineering, Report M-115, Espoo, 1991, 41 p. (in Finnish)
15. Muhonen, A. & Kärnä, T. & Eranti, E. & Riska, K. & Järvinen, E. and Lehmus, E. 1992. Laboratory Indentation Tests with Thick Freshwater Ice, Vol. I. Technical Research Centre of Finland, Research Notes 1370, Espoo, 1992, 92 p. + app. 103 p.
16. Muhonen, A. & Kärnä, T. & Järvinen, E. & Riska, K. & Lehmus, E. 1992. Laboratory Indentation Tests with Thick Freshwater Ice, Vol. II. Helsinki University of Technology, Laboratory of Naval Architecture and Marine Engineering, Report M-122, Espoo, Finland, 1992, 397 p.
17. Riska, K. & Baarman, L. & Muhonen, A. 1992. Modelling of Ice-Induced Vibration of Slender Offshore Structures. Helsinki University of Technology, Arctic Offshore Research Centre, Report M-172, Otaniemi, Finland, 1992, 33 p.
18. Riska, K. & Kukkanen, T. 1994. Speed Dependence of the Natural Modes of an Elastically Scaled Ship Model, Test Results. Helsinki University of Technology, Arctic Offshore Research Centre, Report M-184, Otaniemi, Finland, 1994, 47 p.
19. Riska, K. & Salmela, O. 1994. Description of Ice Conditions along the North-East Passage. Helsinki University of Technology, Arctic Offshore Research Centre, Report M-192, Otaniemi, Finland, 1994, 26 p. + 41 app.
20. Multala, J. & Hautaniemi, H. & Oksama, M. & Leppäranta, M. & Haapala, J. & Herlevi, A. & Riska, K. & Lensu, M. 1995: Airborne Electromagnetic Surveying of Baltic Sea Ice. University of Helsinki, Department of Geophysics, Report Series in Geophysics No. 31, Helsinki 1995, 58 p.
21. La Prairie, D. & Wilhelmson, M.& Riska, K. 1995. A Transit Simulation Model for Ships in Baltic Ice Conditions. Helsinki University of Technology, Ship Laboratory, Report M-200, Otaniemi, Finland, 1995, 38 p.
22. Li, Zhijun, Riska, K. 1996. Preliminary Study of Physical and Mechanical Properties of Model Ice. Helsinki University of Technology, Ship Laboratory, Report M-212, Otaniemi, Finland, 1996, 100 p. + 120 app.
23. Riska, K. & Windeler, M. 1997. Ice-Induced Stresses in the Shell Plating of Ice-Going Vessels. Helsinki University of Technology, Ship Laboratory, Report M-219, Otaniemi, Finland, 1997, 34 p.
24. Tuhkuri, J. & Riska, K. & Wilhelmson, M. & Kennedy, R. & McCarthy, S. 1997. Indentation of Model Scale Pressure Ridges with a Vertical Indentor. Helsinki University of Technology, Ship Laboratory, Report M-230, Otaniemi, Finland, 1997, 63 p.
25. Leiviskä, T., Kennedy, R., Tuhkuri, J., Herrington, P., Aspelund, A. & Riska, K. 2000. Model Tests on Resistance in Ice-Free Channels. Helsinki University of Technology, Ship Laboratory, Report M-255, Otaniemi, Finland, 2000, 27 p.
26. Aspelund, A., Forsey, H. and Riska, K. 2001. Analysis of Trafficability Observations during USCGC Healy Ice Trials, Spring 2000. Helsinki University of Technology, Ship Laboratory, Report M-262, Otaniemi, Finland, 2001, 33 p. + app.
27. Patey, M., Aspelund, A., Forsey, H. and Riska, K. 2001. Ice Top Profile Measurements during USCGC Healy Ice Trials, Spring 2000. Helsinki University of Technology, Ship Laboratory, Report M-261, Otaniemi, Finland, 2001, 23 p. + app.
28. Hänninen, S. & Riska, K. 2001. Description of the Ice performance of USCGC Healy. Helsinki University of Technology, Ship Laboratory, Report M-263, Otaniemi, Finland, 2001, 45 p. + app. (in Finnish)
29. Hänninen, S., Lensu, M. & Riska, K. 2001. Analysis of the Ice Load Measurements during USCGC Healy Ice Trials, Spring 2000. Helsinki University of Technology, Ship Laboratory, Report M-265, Otaniemi, Finland, 2001, 65 p. + app.

=== Magazine articles, lectures and other publications ===
1. Riska, K. & Varsta, P. 1980. Design of Offshore Structures for Low Temperatures. INSKO course Steel Structures in Low temperatures, Helsinki 1980, 47 p. (in Finnish)
2. Sukselainen, J. & Riska, K. 1986. Current Problems in Arctic Vessel Research. International Polar Transportation Conference, Vancouver, Canada, May 4–8, 1986, Proceedings, Vol. 1, pp. 41–65. (Invited Lecture)
3. Riska, K. 1987. Investigation of Factors involved in Longitudinal Strength of Arctic Vessels. Technical Seminar Arranged by CNIIMF and Wärtsilä Marine, Leningrad 29.5.1987, 28 p. (in Finnish and Russian)
4. Riska, K. 1991. Current Research Themes in Arctic Technology. Lecture in the Inauguration of the Finnish Maritime Institute 10.12.1991, Espoo, Finland, 19 # (in Finnish)
5. Riska, K. & Baarman, L. and Muhonen, A. 1992. Modelling of Ice Induced Vibration of Slender Offshore Structures. Third International Conference on Ice Technology, Cambridge, Mass., USA, 11–13 August 1992, 33 p. [unpublished].
6. Wilkman, G. & Riska, K. 1992. Possibilities to Use Model Tests in Ice for the Development of the Northern Sea Route. Conference on Opening the Northern Sea Route, Trondheim, Norway, 2–4 September 1992, 18 p.
7. Riska, K. 1992. The Economic Use of the North-East Passage, Memorandum. The Northern Sea Route Expert Meeting, Tromsö 13–14 October 1992, pp. 243–248.
8. Riska, K. 1994. Research on Arctic Technology. Tiedepolitiikka 2(1994)19, pp. 44–46. (in Finnish)
9. Riska, K. 1994. A Century of Icebreakers. Form Function Finland 4(1994), pp. 30–34.
10. Riska, K. & Tuhkuri, J. 1995. Application of Ice Cover Mechanics in design and Operations of Marine Structures. Proc. of the Sea Ice Mechanics and Arctic Modeling Workshop, April 25–28, 1995, Anchorage, Alaska.
11. Mälkki, P. & Riska, K. & Tuhkuri, J. 1998. Finland: Ice, Environment, Cold Seas - Themes for Marine S&T. Sea Technology, August 1998, pp. 18–21.
12. Riska, K. 1998. The Significance of Winter in the Transport Logistics. Satama 98 Port, Seminar in Naantali 14–15 October 1998. Publications from the Centre for Maritime Studies, University of Turku, Report B 102, Turku 1998, pp. 38–54. (in Finnish)
13. Riska, K. 1999. What Happens When a Ship Hits the Ice Edge?. Tietoyhteys 2(1999), pp. 29–30. (in Finnish)
14. Riska, K. 1999. Dissemination and Exploitation of Results from Basic RTD: How to Do It Better?. Keynote Speech in the Third European Marine Science and Technology Conference, Lisbon, 23–27 May 1998, Conf. Proc. 1999, pp. 379–385.
15. Riska, K. 1999. Arctic Research and Shipping. Ports and Short Sea Shipping, A Baltic Sea Seminar, 14–15 June 1999, Turku, Finland. Publications from the Centre for Maritime Studies, University of Turku, Report A31, pp. 71–80.
16. Riska, K. 1999. The Background of the Powering Requirements in the Finnish-Swedish Ice Class Rules. Maritime Research Seminar ’99, Espoo 17.3.1999, in Nyman, T. (ed.) 2000. VTT Manufacturing Technology, pp. 91–106.
17. Saarinen, S., Riska, K. & Saisto, I. 1999. Ice Force Model Tests of a FPSU System. Maritime Research Seminar ’99, Espoo 17.3.1999, in Nyman, T. (ed.) 2000. VTT Manufacturing Technology, pp. 66–77.
18. Riska, K. 2001. Factors Influencing the Tanker Traffic Safety in Winter in the Gulf of Finland. Lecture in the Safety at Sea Seminar 3.5.2001, Finlandia Hall, Helsinki, Finland. (in Finnish)
19. Riska, K. 2001. The Environmental Safety of Tanker Traffic during Winter in the Gulf of Finland. International Seminar on Combatting Marine Oil Spills in Ice and Cold/Arctic Conditions, Helsinki, Finland 20 – 22 November 2001.
20. Riska, K. 2001. Year-Round Inland Navigation and Short Sea Shipping – a Necessity in Europe, or Is It? A presentation given in the Seminar on Winter Navigation in Coastal and Inland Waterways, Lappeenranta 29–30 November 2001.
21. Riska, K. & Hänninen, S. 2004: Ice Damages of Ice-Strengthened Ships. Lecture at Ice Days, Oulu, February 2004.
22. Riska, K. 2006: Ice Classification of Large Vessels. Lecture at Ice Day, Kemi, February 9–10, 2006.
23. Riska, K. 2008: Forecasting Ice Pressure against Ships. Lecture at Ice Day, Rovaniemi, February 13–14, 2008.
24. Riska, K. 2008: Characteristics of Pollution Response Vessel for the Gulf of Finland. Arctic Shipping Summit, St. Petersburg, April 7–10, 2008.
25. Riska, K. 2009: Implementation of Research Results into Icebreaker Design. Invited lecture at POAC09, 20th International Conf. on Port and Ocean Engineering under Arctic Conditions (POAC09), June 9–12, Luleå, Sweden.
26. Martyuk, G. & Riska, K. 2010: SV Toboy and IB Varandey, Full Scale Trials. Arctic Shipping Summit, Helsinki, April 27–29, 2010.
27. Riska, K. 2010: Bulk Carriers for Northern Baltic; Design Considerations. Lecture at Ice Day, Tornio, February 10–11, 2010.
28. Riska, K. 2011: Propulsion in Ice – An Introduction. Arctic Shipping Summit, Helsinki, April 12–15, 2011.
