= Seiska =

Finnish entertainment and TV magazine

- Editor: Eeva-Helena Jokitaipale
- Categories: Gossip, entertainment
- Frequency: 49 issues per year
- Circulation: 158,207 (2013)
- Publisher: Aller Julkaisut Oy
- Founded: 1992; 34 years ago
- Company: Aller Media
- Country: Finland
- Based in: Helsinki
- Language: Finnish
- Website: www.seiska.fi
- ISSN: 1236-2409

Seiska, also known as 7 päivää (Finnish for 7 days), is a Finnish gossip magazine published in Helsinki, Finland.

== History and profile ==
7 päivää was first published in 1992. The magazine is owned by the Aller Media and is published 49 issues per year by the Aller Julkaisut Oy, a subsidiary of the Aller Media. It focuses mostly on sensationalistic interviews of celebrities and pays rewards for leads on stories. Central subjects for stories are weddings, divorces and other celebrity gossip. The magazine has also a TV supplement TV-Seiska. Ilkka Janhunen is among the past editors-in-chief of 7 päivää.

In May 2006 7 päivää caused a controversy by printing on its front cover a picture of Tomi Putaansuu, the lead singer of the band Lordi, without his face make-up on, although the band had requested – after winning the Eurovision Song Contest 2006 – that no pictures of unmasked band members be published. The picture caused a huge reaction among Finns, and in merely two days over 180,000 Finns had signed a pledge to boycott the magazine. Some advertisers even withdrew their contracts with 7 päivää because of the event. The magazine quickly apologized for the picture. Katso also published some pictures, too, but it did not gain so much attention.

== Circulation ==
The circulation of 7 päivää was 265,400 copies in 2006. It dropped to 246,800 copies in 2007. The magazine had a circulation of 211,707 copies in 2010. Its circulation fell to 197,607 copies in 2011. The circulation of the weekly was 170,867 copies, making it the seventh largest magazine in Finland. It was the fourth best-selling magazine in Finland with a circulation of 158,207 copies in 2013.

== See also ==
- List of magazines in Finland
