= Urheilulehti =

Finnish weekly sports magazine

- Editor: Johanna Lahti
- Categories: Sports magazine
- Frequency: Weekly
- Publisher: Sanoma Media Finland Oy
- Founder: Ivar Wilskman
- First issue: 1 January 1898; 128 years ago
- Country: Finland
- Based in: Helsinki
- Language: Finnish
- Website: Urheilulehti

Urheilulehti is a popular weekly Finnish sports magazine. It is the second oldest sports journal in the World (after Italian La Gazzetta dello Sport).

== History and profile ==
Urheilulehti was founded by Ivar Wilskman in January 1898. The magazine is published by A-lehdet Oy weekly on Thursdays. Its headquarters is in Helsinki.

The current editor-in-chief of Urheilulehti is Jukka Rönkä. The sports Library has all issues of the magazine.

In 2013, Urheilulehti had a circulation of 31,453 copies.

Currently as of 2024, Urheilulehti is published by Sanoma Media Finland, which bought it in 2017. In 2018, the average weekly reader number of Urheilulehti was 115,000.

== See also ==
- List of magazines in Finland
