= Finnish Association for Nature Conservation =

Finnish non-governmental organization

The Finnish Association for Nature Conservation
- Formation: May 27, 1938; 88 years ago
- Type: NGO
- Legal status: Association
- Purpose: Environmental protection, nature conservation
- Headquarters: Helsinki
- Location: Sörnäistenkatu 1, 00580 Helsinki
- Members: private persons
- Official language: Finnish
- Executive Director: Tapani Veistola
- Key people: Chair of the Board Hanna Halmeenpää
- Staff: employs around 60 people at its central and regional offices
- Volunteers: around 29,000
- Website: www.sll.fi/en/

The Finnish Association for Nature Conservation (in Finnish: Suomen luonnonsuojeluliitto (SLL)) is the largest non-governmental organization for environmental protection and nature conservation in Finland with around 29,000 members. It was established in 1938, but the oldest local member association, The Kuopio Nature Friends Association, is over 110 years old (founded in 1896).

== Major work ==
The major themes of environmental work include:

- forest protection
- climate change prevention and sustainable energy policy
- mire and water protection
- sustainable production and consumption
- management and protection of cultural landscapes
- protection of endangered species including the Saimaa ringed seal
- protection of pollinators
- hosting the European EKOenergy Secretariat

== Publications ==
Suomen Luonto (Nature of Finland) is published by the Finnish Association for Nature Conservation. It is Finland's largest nature magazine. The association also publishes a member magazine, Luonnonsuojelija (lit. Nature Protector).

== Logo ==
In the logo is the Saimaa ringed seal, an endemic animal (only in Finland). Its future is endangered.
