= Ooho =

Ooho may refer to:

- Ooho, a type of edible water bottle
- Ooho, Japan or Ōho, Japan (大保) in Fukuoka Prefecture
- Ooho Station or Ōho Station (大保駅（おおほ）) rail station on the Tenjin Ōmuta Line

== See also ==
- Ōhō (応保), Japanese era from 1161 to 1163
- Ouhou (歐侯), descent from Yue
- Oho (disambiguation)
