= Committee of 100 (Finland) =

- Sadankomitea
- Formation: 1963; 63 years ago
- Type: Nonprofit
- Headquarters: Veturitori 3, 00520 Helsinki, Finland
- Secretary General: Jarmo Pykälä
- Chairperson: Silvia Modig
- Vice-chairperson: Nora Luoma
- Publication: Ydin
- Parent organization: International Peace Bureau

The Committee of 100 in Finland (Sadankomitea in Finnish) was founded in 1963, based on the model of the Committee of 100 in Great Britain.

The Committee of 100 has been one of foremost organizations of the peace movement in Finland, especially in the 1960s.

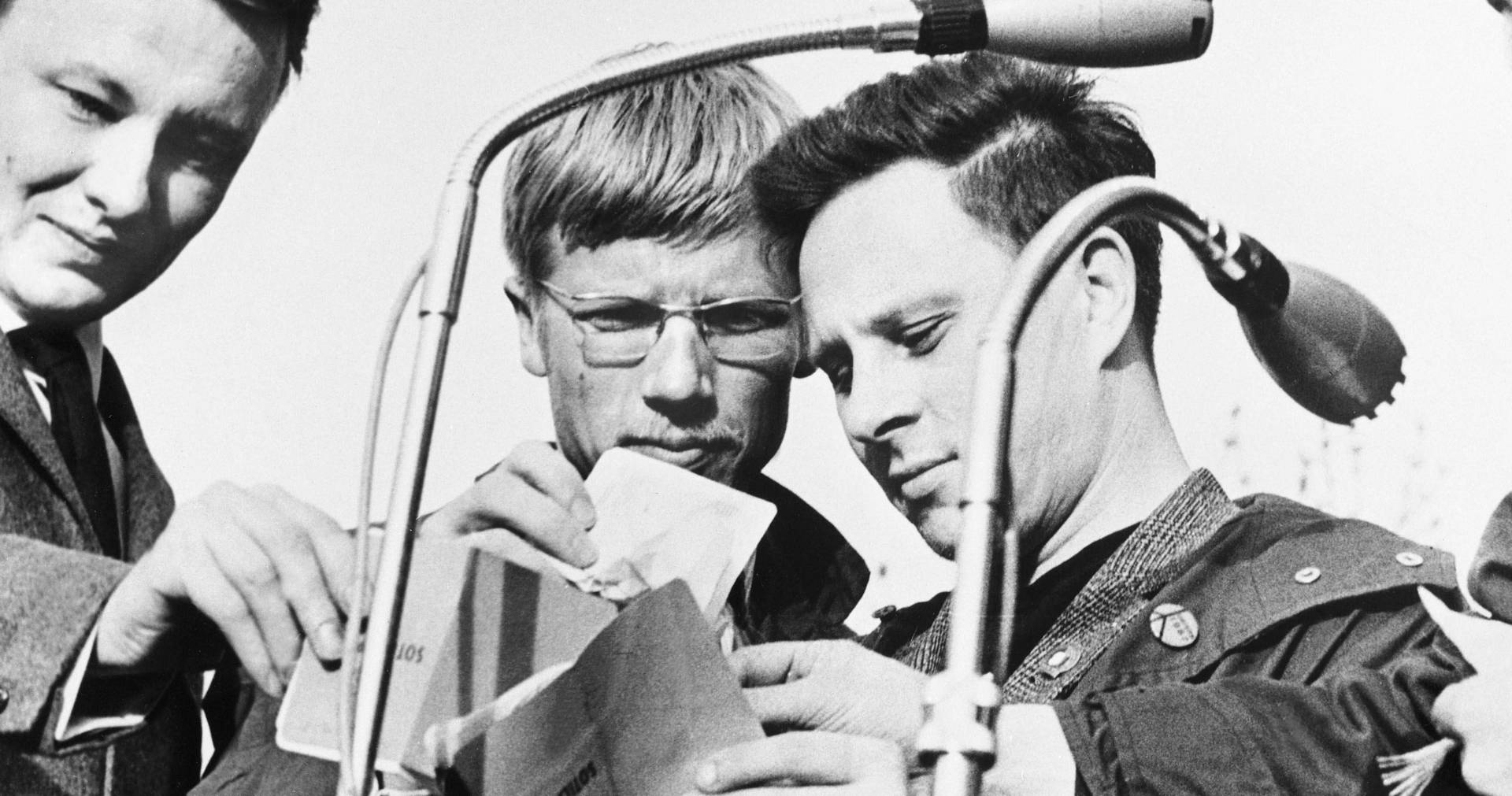
Three members of Sadankomitea burn their military passports publicly in Helsinki in 1967

Since 1966 the Committee of 100 has helped publish the magazine Ydin and, since 2007, the online magazine Pax; it also organises seminars, distributes pamphlets, and lobbies for peace and human rights. It has particularly criticised Finland's refusal to participate in international treaties banning cluster bombs.

Active persons in the Committee of 100 have included the former Finnish Foreign Minister Erkki Tuomioja.

== See also ==
- Committee of 100 (United Kingdom)
- CND
