= Vihreä Lanka =

Finnish political magazine (1983–2019)

- Editor-in-chief: Riikka Suominen
- Categories: Political magazine
- Frequency: Eight times per year
- Publisher: Vihreä Lanka Oy
- Founded: 1983
- Final issue: December 2019
- Country: Finland
- Based in: Helsinki
- Language: Finnish
- Website: vihrealanka.fi
- ISSN: 0780-9417
- OCLC: 476261893

Vihreä Lanka was a political magazine representing the views of the Green League, published eight times per year in Helsinki, Finland. From 1983 to 2016, it was published biweekly in newspaper form. From 2016, Vihreä Lanka was published as a periodical magazine until December 2019 when it ceased publication.

== History and profile ==
Vihreä Lanka was launched as a newspaper in 1983 and published by Vihreä Lanka Oy. Its publisher was established in 1988. The magazine was headquartered in Helsinki and was published in tabloid format biweekly on Fridays. It was a political publication with an affiliation with the Green League.

Elina Grundström served as the editor-in-chief of Vihreä Lanka between 2006 and 2010. Juha Honkonen was another editor-in-chief of the biweekly.

In 2011, Vihreä Lanka had a checked circulation of 10,200 copies. It was redesigned as a magazine in 2016 to improve its readership. However, this did not work, and the circulation increased to just 10,000 copies. As a result, the magazine and its website were closed in December 2019. In August 2020, the magazine was succeeded by another magazine, Vihreä (Finnish: Green), which was started by the Green League. The party has since withdrawn all funding that it had given to Finnish green magazines and newspapers.

== See also ==
- List of magazines in Finland
