= Rauhan Puolesta =

Finnish news magazine

- Categories: Cultural and news magazine
- Frequency: Six times per year
- Publisher: Finnish Peace Committee
- Founded: 1957
- Country: Finland
- Based in: Helsinki
- Language: Finnish
- Website: Rauhan Puolesta
- ISSN: 0786-7026
- OCLC: 477242816

Rauhan Puolesta (Finnish: Pro Peace) is a cultural and news magazine published in Helsinki, Finland. It has been circulated since 1957.

== History and profile ==
Rauhan Puolesta was established in 1957. It is published by the Finnish Peace Committee. The magazine, based in Helsinki, appears six times a year and disseminates the news about the committee. The magazine has both in print and online versions. The newsletter of the Africa Committee in Finland is also published in the magazine.

== See also ==
- List of magazines in Finland
