= Pirkka (brand) =

Finnish private label brand

The Pirkka logo

Pirkka is a private label brand used by grocery stores owned by the Finnish Kesko chain.

The first Pirkka products came onto the market in 1986. In February 2013 there were over 2,200 Pirkka products. About 80% of Pirkka brand products made by Kesko are foodstuffs.

Pirkka is listed in the "Well known brand names" list kept by the Finnish patent and register office.

== History ==
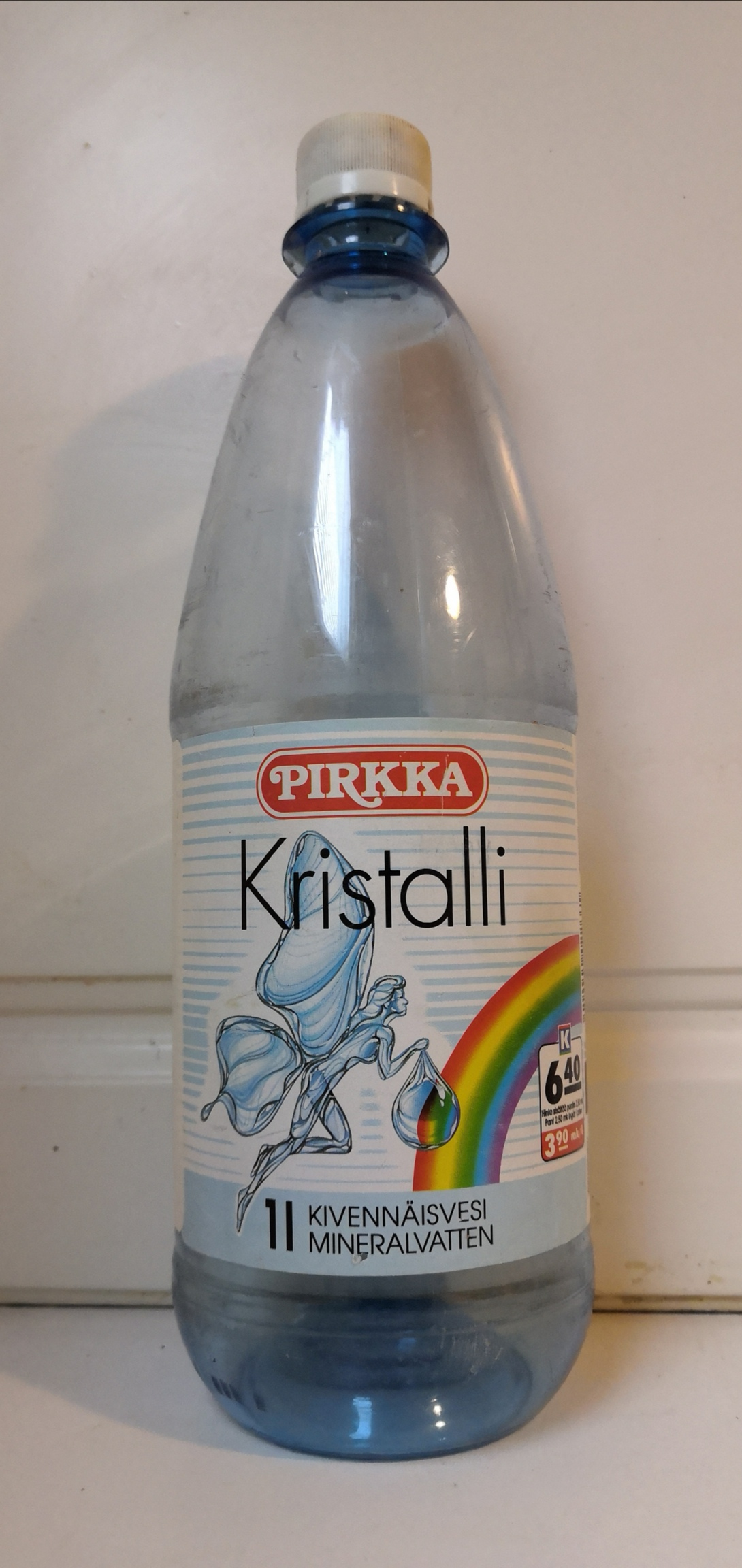
Old Pirkka mineral water bottle

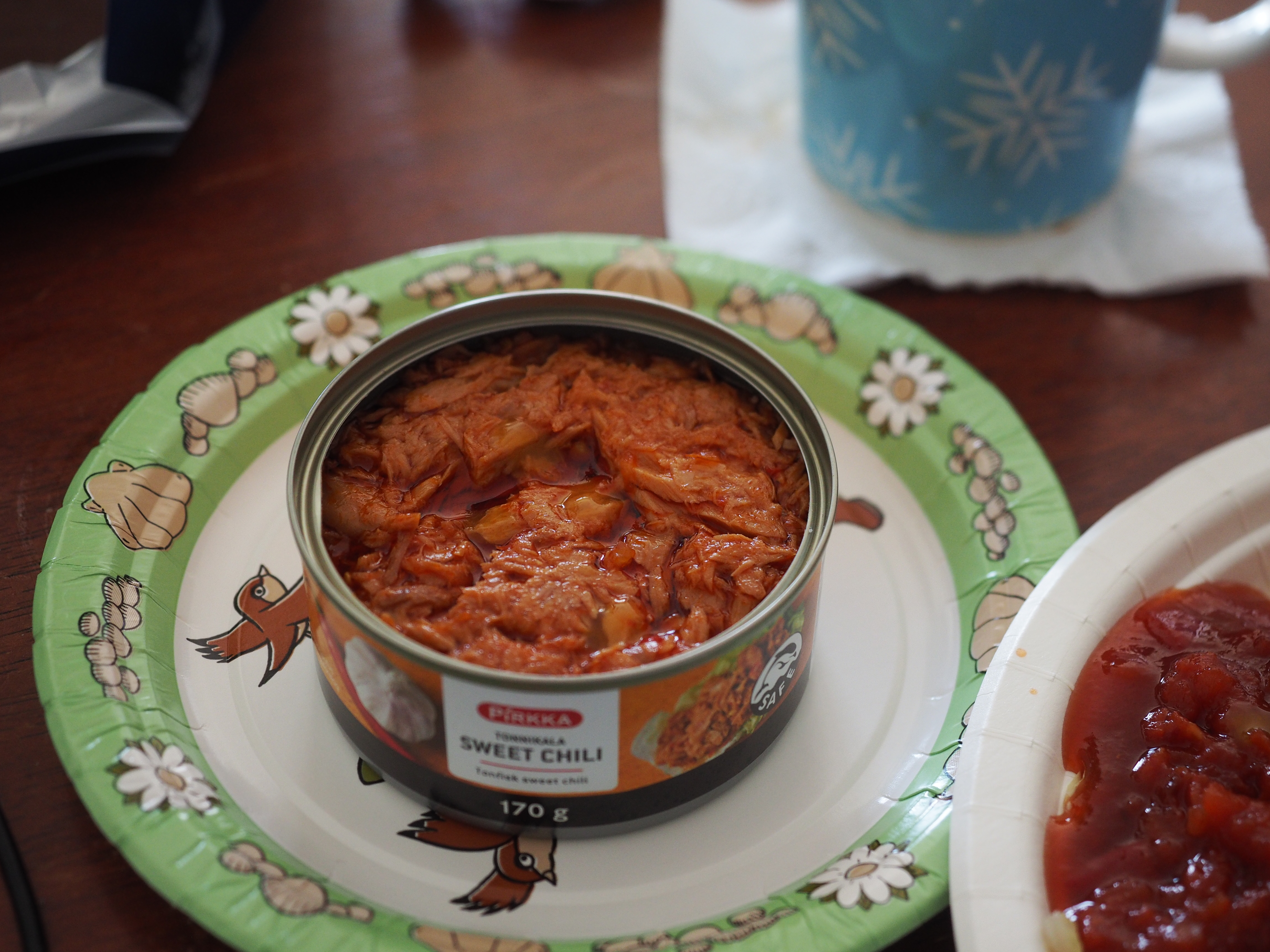
"Pirkka" brand canned tuna in Sweet Chili sauce

Pirkka was the first private label brand with a large selection in Finland. Pirkka was preceded by the "Sinivalkoiset" (Blue and White) brand, but it did not have the same personal brand appearance as Pirkka.

The first Pirkka brand products were basic daily household products, such as baking margarine, crisp rye bread, pea soup, washing powder, diapers and shampoo. During the first five years the number of Pirkka products grew to over 300 and during the first ten years to over 500. In 1996 ecological products were launched into the Pirkka series, with the "Luomu" ladybug as its symbol. In 1999 Pirkka started cooperation with the Fair Trade association, and the Pirkka Fair Trade coffee was launched. Pirkka brand products previously had pre-printed price labels, but they were removed in September 2001, when the new Pirkka logo was also taken into use. In 2013 the product line includes almost a hundred ecological products and about 40 Fair Trade products.

== Criticism ==
An investigation done by Finnwatch in spring 2012 revealed human rights and workers' rights violations at two Thai factories producing private label products. Kesko announced it would act to fix these problems.

== Rankings ==
MTV3 selected Pirkka brand coffee as the winner in its blind tasting test of eight different coffees in January 2013.

The Pirkka brand two-bladed safety razor came second after the Gillette Fusion in the Yle TV1 Kuningaskuluttaja "three hard ones" test in 2011. In the previous year, Pirkka brand Karelian pasties came second in the same test after Fazer's Vuoksi pasties.

In 2012 the Pirkka magazine owned by Kesko ranked six different grill sausages (HK Kabanossi Original, Pirkka A-class grill sausage, Atria Wilhelm Perinteinen, Snellman Eetwartti, Portti UkkoPekka and Tapola Viiden tähden rillimakkara) and selected Kesko's Pirkka sausage as the best.

== See also ==
- Euro Shopper
