= Tuulilasi =

Finnish automobile magazine

- Editor: Olli Koivusalo
- Frequency: 16 times per year
- Founded: 1963; 62 years ago
- Company: A-lehdet Oy
- Country: Finland
- Based in: Helsinki
- Language: Finnish
- Website: Tuulilasi
- ISSN: 0041-4468

Tuulilasi (Finnish: Windscreen) is one of the biggest automobile magazines published in Helsinki, Finland. It has been in circulation since 1963.

== History and profile ==
Tuulilasi has been published since 1963 by A-lehdet Oy as of 2009 the third publisher in the country. The magazine is published 16 times per year. It has its headquarters in Helsinki.

Tuulilasi covers news and articles about automobiles without focusing on any specific sector in the field.

In 2007 the circulation of Tuulilasi was 86,000 copies. In 2009 the magazine had a circulation of 80,000 copies and a readership of about 500,000. In 2010 it fell to 77,895 copies. The 2011 circulation of the magazine was 78,432 copies. It fell to 68,748 copies in 2012 and 62,476 copies in 2013.

== See also ==
- List of magazines in Finland
