= Auto Bild =

German automobile magazine

- Auto Bild sample cover
- Editor-in-Chief: Robin Hornig
- Categories: Automobile magazine
- Frequency: Weekly
- Circulation: 133,082 (Q1 2025)
- First issue: 23 February 1986; 40 years ago
- Company: Axel Springer AG
- Country: Germany
- Based in: Hamburg
- Language: German
- Website: autobild.de
- ISSN: 0930-7095

Auto Bild is a German automobile magazine based in Hamburg, Germany.

== History and profile ==
Auto Bild was first published on the last week of February 1986. The magazine is published by Axel Springer AG on a weekly basis. The website of the magazine was started in 1996. From May 2009, another magazine Auto Bild Motorsport began to appear weekly in Auto Bild.

Auto Bild with its worldwide licensed editions, of which more than seven million copies are sold every month, is published in 36 countries. Foreign editions include France's Auto Plus, the United Kingdom's Auto Express and Turkey's Auto Show. The magazine also has a Polish edition, which is part of Axel Springer AG via its subsidiary Axel Springer Polska.

In the Netherlands, Auto Bild's local edition is called AutoWeek and has been published since 19 January 1990.

In 2003 until 2017, the Indonesian edition was launched by Kompas Gramedia Group.

The Finnish edition of the magazine, Auto Bild Suomi, was started in 2004, and is published by Fokus Media Finland. The Bulgarian version of the magazine is published under the name of Auto Bild Bulgaria which also published by Axel Springer AG.

In Spain, its edition is published on a weekly basis with the original name by Axel Springer AG. The Italian edition of the magazine, Auto Oggi, is licensed by Mondadori. In 2008, its Romanian edition was launched by Ringier. It is published on a bimonthly basis. On 15 November 2012, the Argentina edition was started by Grupo Veintitres which holds the license of the magazine.

== Circulation ==
In 2001, Auto Bild had a circulation of 792,000 copies in Germany. The circulation of the magazine was down to 592,245 copies in Germany in 2010, making it the fourth best selling European automobile magazine. The same year, its Spanish edition had a circulation of 32,484 copies. Its circulation was down to 555,500 copies in 2012 in Germany. During the second quarter of 2016, the circulation was down to 374,981 copies in the country. In first quarter of 2024, the circulation was down to 157,343 copies in the country.

== Editors-in-chief ==
- Werner Rudi (1986–1988)
- Peter J. Glodschey (1986–1994)
- Peter Felske (1988–2006)
- Bernd Wieland (2006–2017)
- Tom Drechsler (2017–2023)
- Robin Hornig (2023–present)

== See also ==
- Bild
