= Tiede =

Tiede may refer to:

- Tiede, a Finnish popular science magazine
- Bernie Tiede (born 1958), American mortician and murderer
- Herbert Tiede (1915–1987), German actor
- Peter Tiede (born 1970), German journalist (BILD)
- Tiede Herrema (1921–2020), Dutch businessman
- The Tiede family, victims of a homicidal attack by Von Taylor and Edward Deli in Oakley, Utah; see 1990 Tiede cabin murders
