= Kodin Kuvalehti =

Finnish women's magazine

- Categories: Women's magazine Home magazine
- Frequency: Fortnightly
- Publisher: Sanoma Magazines Finland
- Founded: 1967; 58 years ago
- Company: Sanoma
- Country: Finland
- Based in: Helsinki
- Language: Finnish
- Website: Kodin Kuvalehti

Kodin Kuvalehti is a Finnish language fortnightly home and women's magazine published in Helsinki, Finland.

== History and profile ==
Kodin Kuvalehti was established by SanomaWSOY in 1967. The magazine is published by Sanoma Magazines Finland. It is published on a fortnightly basis in Helsinki. Its major reader group is the middle class Finnish women.

Kodin Kuvalehti sold 682,000 copies in 2003. The magazine had a circulation of 182,900 copies in 2007. It was the best-selling women's magazine in Finland with a circulation of 178,000 copies in 2009. In 2010 the circulation of the fortnightly was 174,710 copies. Its circulation fell to 168,502 copies in 2011. It was largest Finnish women's magazine and the eighth best-selling Finnish magazine in 2012 with a circulation of 158,375 copies. It was the largest Finnish women's magazine in 2013 with a circulation of 138,569 copies.

== See also ==
List of magazines in Finland
