= Seura =

Weekly family magazine in Finland

- Editor-in-chief: Erkki Meriluoto
- Categories: Family magazine
- Frequency: 49 issues per year
- Publisher: Otavamedia
- Founded: 1934; 92 years ago
- Company: Otava Group
- Country: Finland
- Based in: Helsinki
- Language: Finnish
- Website: seura.fi
- ISSN: 0358-8017
- OCLC: 35752716

Seura is a family magazine published 49 issues per year in Helsinki, Finland, and has been in circulation since 1934.

== History and profile ==
The first issue of Seura was published in 1934 by Yhtyneet Kuvalehdet. A sample issue was published in the previous year. The magazine appeared on a weekly basis during its initial period.

The magazine is part of the Otava Group and its publisher is Otavamedia. The magazine targets family-oriented women in their 40s or older and is published 49 issues per year. The headquarters of the magazine is in Helsinki.

Seura was one of the Finnish magazines which published negative views about the Jews in the pre-World War II period. The magazine mostly covers articles on education, parenting, health issues, food, travelling, and world affairs. It lost its market share to magazines that concentrate on celebrity gossip. Jari Lindholm was appointed as editor-in-chief in September 2004 to regain market share. Lindholm resigned on 14 April 2006 after failing to improve circulation. The current editor-in-chief is Erkki Meriluoto.

On 15 April 2005 Seura printed a story about Prime Minister Matti Vanhanen's and Minister of Culture Tanja Karpela's common night in a hotel room. The story was based on an anonymous source and was dismissed as "slimy gossip".

== Circulation ==
Seura had a circulation of 189,600 copies in 2007. The 2010 circulation of the magazine was 165,051 copies. Its circulation was 158,720 copies in 2011 and 143,385 copies in 2012. It fell to 133,766 copies in 2013.

== See also ==
- List of magazines in Finland
