= Kevätpörriäinen =

- Frequency: Annually
- Founded: 1949; 77 years ago
- Company: Helsinki-Uusimaan Luokanopettajat ry
- Country: Finland
- Based in: Helsinki
- Language: Finnish

Kevätpörriäinen (Finnish: "spring buzzing bee") is an annual Finnish magazine in Helsinki.

== History and profile ==
Kevätpörriäinen was founded in 1949. The publisher is the regional teachers’ association Helsinki-Uusimaan Luokanopettajat ry. The full-color magazine is produced entirely by volunteer children from primary schools in Helsinki. Every year, teachers in Helsinki schools ask their pupils to write stories and poems and draw pictures for the magazine and, after the articles are approved, the magazine is sent to be printed.

The magazine is sold through primary school student volunteers on the streets of Helsinki and sometimes door-to-door. It is not available through retail outlets.
