= Auto Bild Suomi =

Biweekly automobile magazine in Finland

Auto Bild Suomi is a biweekly magazine with a special focus on automobiles which is the Finnish edition of German magazine Auto Bild. It was started by Sanoma Magazines Finland in 2003, and the first issue appeared on 12 March 2004. The frequency of the magazine is biweekly, and it targets men aged 18-49. The magazine offers information on buying and using a car and features articles on test drives and comparisons of the new car models.

In 2005 Auto Bild Suomi was acquired by Fokus Media Finland based in Helsinki. The editor-in-chief of the magazine is Pekka Kaidesoja.
