= Me Naiset =

Women's magazine in Finland

- Editor-in-chief: Iina Artima-Kyrki
- Categories: Women's magazine
- Frequency: Weekly
- Publisher: Sanoma Magazines
- Founder: Kaarlo Mantere
- Founded: 1952; 74 years ago
- Company: Sanoma
- Country: Finland
- Based in: Helsinki
- Language: Finnish
- Website: Me Naiset
- ISSN: 0025-6277
- OCLC: 6318366

Me Naiset (Finnish: We the Women) is a women's magazine published in Helsinki, Finland. It is one of the largest weekly women's magazines in the country and has been in circulation since 1952.

== History and profile ==
Me Naiset was established in 1952. Its founder was Kaarlo Mantere, a Finnish publisher. Later it was sold to Viikkosanomat Oy. The owner of the magazine is Sanoma, and it is published by Sanoma Magazines on a weekly basis on Thursdays. The company acquired the magazine in 1957. In 1958 the magazine began to employ its own fashion models. Me Naiset was the only weekly women's magazine in Finland until 1963 when another weekly entitled Anna was started.

The headquarters of Me Naiset is in Helsinki. Target audience of the magazine is women living in big cities and in Southern Finland. Its sister magazine is Me Naiset SPORT.

Me Naiset focuses on fashion, beauty and shopping. However, until the end of the 1990s the weekly mostly published articles on social and political topics. From the early 2000s it began to feature articles about motherhood.

Replacing Riitta Pollari, Marjo Vuorinen served as the editor-in-chief of Me Naiset between 2010 and 2012. On 23 July 2012 Johanna Lahti became its editor-in-chief.

== Circulation and popularity ==
During the early years Me Naiset sold 25,000 copies. Its circulation rose to 36,000 copies in 1958. The average circulation of the magazine was 70,000 copies in 1961. It rose to over 120,000 copies in 1962 and to 180,000 copies in 1973. In the period between 1965 and 1975 the magazine was one of the most popular magazines in the country. Its circulation was 133,000 copies in 1978.

The weekly had a circulation of 124,485 copies in 2004. Its circulation was 134,000 copies in 2007. The circulation of the magazine was 147,354 copies in 2010 and 146,248 copies in 2011. Its circulation was 138,594 copies in 2012 and 119,631 copies in 2013. As of 2014 Me Naiset was the most popular women’s general magazine in Finland.

== See also ==
List of magazines in Finland
