= Forum (business magazine) =

- Editor in Chief: Torsten Fagerholm
- Categories: Business magazine
- Frequency: Monthly
- Circulation: 10 944 (2016; print)
- Founder: Amos Anderson
- First issue: 1968
- Final issue Number: 2021-10
- Country: Finland
- Based in: Helsingfors
- Language: Swedish
- Website: http://www.forum-mag.fi/
- ISSN: 0533-070X

Forum business magazine (Affärsmagasinet Forum, Forum för ekonomi och teknik) was a monthly magazine published in print and online. It is Finland's only Swedish-language business, technology and management publication. Articles spanning from 1968 to 2021 are available in a digital archive.

Forum focused on how emerging technologies affect the economy and society from a career and management perspective. Coverage areas included entrepreneurship and innovations in Finland and the Nordic area, as well as the Baltics, the US and Asia. The magazine reached 27,000 well-educated readers in management positions, mainly business graduates, engineers and architects, both in Finland and abroad. Roughly 76% of the readers were in management positions or worked as entrepreneurs.

== History and profile ==
Forum was founded in 1968 through a merger of various technology and business publications whose roots stretch back to 1880. Forum's stated mission is to act as an ”independent liberal magazine, editorially free from any party or organization, striving to promote a spirit of humanistic enlightenment, democracy, open and transparent business, as well as innovation and entrepreneurship”. The final editor-in-chiefs include Patrik Lindfors, Fredrik Nars, Ragnhild Artimo, Torsten Fagerholm and Sören Jonsson. The final issue 2021-10 was published in December 2021.
