= Aatami =

Finnish men's magazine (1944–1954)

- Categories: Men's magazine
- Founded: 1944
- First issue: December 1944
- Final issue: 1954
- Country: Finland
- Language: Finnish

Aatami (Finnish: Adam) was a Finnish language men's magazine that was in circulation between 1944 and 1954 and was the first magazine specifically targeted male readers in Finland. The first issue appeared in December 1944. The magazine considered its readers as fellow soldiers who returned home from World War II and now attempted to create a peaceful society in Finland. However, if the soldiers committed crimes, Aatami called them hooligans who were not genuine frontline soldiers.

It had an anti-communist political stance and mostly featured the views of non-socialist figures. In addition, Aatami attempted to improve the negative images of Finnish men who had been portrayed as heavy drunks and discussed the moral and sexual codes for men.
