= Markkinointi & Mainonta =

Finnish marketing magazine (1994–2020)

- Categories: Marketing magazine
- Frequency: Weekly (1994–2009); Biweekly (2009–2020)
- Founded: 1994
- Final issue: 18 December 2020
- Company: Alma Talent
- Country: Finland
- Based in: Helsinki
- Language: Finnish
- ISSN: 1237-6655
- OCLC: 925301832

Markkinointi & Mainonta, abbreviated as M&M, (Finnish: Marketing and Advertising) was a marketing magazine based in Helsinki, Finland. It was in circulation between 1994 and 2020.

== History and profile ==
M&M was started in 1994 by a group, including Kim Weckström, a Finnish entrepreneur. Weckström was the founding editor of the magazine. M&M was first owned by Talentum. Later it became part of Alma Talent.

M&M came out weekly between its start in 1994 and 2009. Then it appeared on a biweekly basis. As of 2009 Heimo Hatakka was the editor-in-chief of the magazine.

The target audience of M&M was marketing professionals, including the managers and decision makers in the field. The magazine published annual lists such as Top 300 brands. The editors of the magazine joined a jury members in the Epica contest on Europe's best advertising. The last edition of the magazine appeared on 18 December 2020. The parent company, Alma Talent, also closed two other magazines, Metallitekniikka and Tekniikan Historia.

M&M sold 3,500 copies in 2018.

== See also ==
List of magazines in Finland
