= Tekniikan Maailma =

Finnish automobile magazine

- Editor-in-Chief: Velimatti Honkanen
- Categories: Automobile magazine
- Frequency: Monthly
- Circulation: 109,490 (2013)
- Publisher: Yhtyneet Kuvalehdet Oy
- Founded: 1953; 72 years ago
- Company: Otavamedia
- Country: Finland
- Based in: Helsinki
- Language: Finnish
- Website: Tekniikan Maailma
- ISSN: 0355-4287

Tekniikan Maailma, abbreviation TM, (English: World of Technology) is one of the leading automobile magazines in published in Helsinki, Finland.

== History and profile ==
Tekniikan Maailma started in 1953. The magazine is based in Helsinki. It is owned by Otavamedia and is published monthly by Yhtyneet Kuvalehdet Oy.

Tekniikan Maailma covers all kinds of technology but around half of its content is related to automobiles.

== Circulation ==
In 2002 Tekniikan Maailma had a circulation of 140,838 copies. The circulation of the magazine was 145,900 copies in 2006 and 150,800 copies in 2007.

In 2009 Tekniikan Maailma was 148,000 copies. In 2010 its circulation fell to 93,747 copies, but it grew to 102,947 copies in 2011. In 2012 the circulation of the magazine rose to 103,914 copies and to 109,490 copies in 2013.
