= ET-lehti =

Finnish general interest magazine

- Editor-in-chief: Riitta Korhonen
- Categories: Lifestyle magazine
- Frequency: 20 issues per year
- Publisher: Sanoma Magazines
- Founded: 1973; 53 years ago
- Company: Sanoma
- Country: Finland
- Based in: Tampere
- Language: Finnish
- Website: ET-lehti
- ISSN: 0785-0913
- OCLC: 925096052

ET-lehti is a general interest magazine targeting senior people and is published in Tampere, Finland. The abbreviation, ET, stands for the Finnish word, EläkeTieto (Finnish: Retirement Information). The magazine has also a Swedish edition.

== History and profile ==
ET-lehti was established in 1973 and was originally started as a magazine for retired people. The magazine is part of Sanoma and published by Sanoma Magazines. Sanoma acquired the magazine in 1983. It was published 18 times a year. Later it began to come out 20 times per year. The magazine targets senior people and is most read by women older than 50 years. It was the sole publication in its category until 2014. The frequent topics are about wellbeing, health, beauty, travel and finance. The headquarters of the magazine is in Tampere. The Swedish edition of the magazine was launched by Sanoma.

Kaisa Larmela is one of its former editors-in-chief who was appointed to the post in 1989. Riitta Korhonen became the editor-in-chief of the magazine on 15 February 2012. She succeeded Maija Toppila who had been serving in the post since 1 April 2008.

== Circulation ==
ET-lehti sold 259,291 copies in 2007, making it the second best selling magazine in Finland. Its circulation fell to 254,000 copies in 2009 and to 237,265 copies in 2010. The magazine had a circulation of 232,260 copies in 2011. It was the fifth best-selling Finnish magazine in 2012 with a circulation of 226,853 copies. Its circulation was 202,259 copies in 2013, making it the best-selling title in the Nordic countries.

== See also ==
- List of magazines in Finland
