= Oho! =

Finnish women's magazine

- Categories: Entertainment magazine Women's magazine
- Frequency: Weekly
- Publisher: Aller
- Founded: 2002
- Final issue: March 2009
- Company: Aller
- Country: Finland
- Based in: Helsinki
- Language: Finnish

Oho! was a Finnish weekly entertainment and women's magazine published in Helsinki, Finland, between 2002 and 2009.

== History and profile ==
Oho! was started by the Danish company Aller in 2002. The magazine was also published by the company. It was partially a competitor to the similar 7 päivää magazine published by same publisher.

Target audience of Oho! was 18- to 30-year-old women. The editor-in-chief of the magazine was Eeva-Helena Jokitaipale who also served as the editor-in-chief of 7 päivää.

In March 2009 Oho! ceased publication.
