= Valitut Palat =

Finnish family magazine

- Categories: Family magazine
- Frequency: Monthly
- Publisher: Oy Valitut Palat
- Founded: 1945; 81 years ago
- First issue: April 1945
- Company: CIL Group
- Country: Finland
- Based in: Helsinki
- Language: Finnish
- Website: Valitut Palat

Valitut Palat (lit. 'Selected Pieces') is a monthly general-interest family magazine published in Helsinki, Finland. It is the Finnish edition of Reader's Digest.

== History and profile ==
Valitut Palat was started by Sanoma in 1945, and the first issue appeared in April that year. Eljas Erkko was instrumental in the establishment of the magazine, and his assistant Sirkka Ruotsalainen was the founding editor-in-chief. Its publisher is Oy Valitut Palat which was part of Reader's Digest Inc. The Club Internacional del Libro group (CIL Group) acquired the Oy Valitut Palat on 30 April 2013. The magazine has its headquarters in Helsinki and is published on a monthly basis.

Valitut Palat supports both conservative values and modern technology. During the Cold War period it functioned as a window for Finland to the West and was among the leading anti-communist publications in the country. The Finnish-Soviet Union Association claimed that both Valitut Palat and Det Bästa, Swedish edition of Reader's Digest, were two major anti-Soviet propaganda tools in Finland.

The magazine covers content from its parent publication, Reader's Digest, but its material is adapted to the needs and cultural background of Finnish readers.

== Circulation ==
The first two issue of Valitut Palat sold 50,000 copies and 75,000 copies, respectively. The magazine had a circulation of 100,000 copies in 1957.

In 2007 the circulation of Valitut Palat was 223,300 copies. Its circulation was 197,000 copies in 2009, 187,404 copies in 2010 and 177,578 copies in 2011. In 2012 the circulation of the magazine was 157,979 copies. Its 2013 circulation dropped to 131,663 copies.

== See also ==
- List of magazines in Finland
