= Futari (magazine) =

Finnish monthly sport magazine (1982–2010)

- Categories: Sport magazine
- Frequency: Monthly
- Publisher: Markkinointiviestintä Dialogi Oy
- Founded: 1982
- Final issue: 2010
- Company: Football Association of Finland
- Country: Finland
- Based in: Helsinki
- Language: Finnish

Futari was a monthly sport magazine with a special reference to association football published in Finland. The magazine was started in 1982. It was the organ of the Football Association of Finland. It had its headquarters in Helsinki and was published on the first day of each month. Its publisher was Markkinointiviestintä Dialogi Oy, a subsidiary of A-lehdet Group. In 2010 Futari merged with another sport magazine, Football, to form Maali!.

== See also ==
List of magazines in Finland
