= Ovi (magazine) =

Finnish multilingual non-profit publication

The Ovi
- Website type: Online Magazine
- Owner: Chameleon
- Creators: Thanos Kalamidas and Asa Butcher
- Website: ovimagazine.com
- Commercial: No
- Registration: No
- Launched: Dec 2004
- Current status: Not-Active

Ovi (meaning Door in English) is a multilingual non-profit daily publication that carries articles about ideas and opinion. It is based in Helsinki, Finland.

== History and profile ==
Launched in December 2004 by two immigrants to Finland, Asa Butcher and Thanos Kalamidas, Ovi carries contributions to society, politics and culture in a number of different languages.

In 2006 Ovi was chosen as a Uranus.fi Success Story.

Since 4 September 2006 the site has had daily updates and continues to cover various global issues, including discrimination, inequality, poverty, human rights and children's rights.

In January 2007, Ovi came second in Newropeans Magazine's Grands Prix 2006 awards. It was nominated as one of the three finalists in the 'Citizenship - Information' section of the awards. The awards recognise people active in the democratisation of the EU. A registered jury of around 1,000 people voted online, awarding Ovi 29% of the vote.

== See also ==
- List of Finnish magazines
