= Muutoksen kevät =

Finnish political magazine

- Categories: Political magazine
- Frequency: Quarterly
- Founded: 1995
- First issue: April 1996
- Final issue Number: Fall 2003; 30
- Country: Finland
- Based in: Tampere
- Language: Finnish

Muutoksen kevät (Finnish: Spring of Change) was a Finnish quarterly political magazine which covered environmental issues and topics related to human and animal rights. It was based in Tampere, Finland, and was in circulation from 1995 to 2003.

== History and profile ==
Muutoksen kevät was established in Fall 1995, and the first issue was published April 1996. It was headquartered in Tampere and was published on a quarterly basis. The magazine featured articles about environment, human rights and animal rights. It supported the idea that ecological change could be achieved through political activism. Muutoksen kevät ceased publication due to financial problems, and its last issue, numbered 30, appeared in Fall 2003.
