= Fakta (magazine) =

Finnish business magazine

- Categories: Business magazine
- Frequency: Monthly
- Publisher: Talentum Media Oy
- Founded: 1981
- Final issue: 2024 (42–43 years)
- Company: Talentum Oy
- Country: Finland
- Based in: Helsinki
- Language: Finnish
- Website: Fakta

Fakta was a monthly business and professional magazine published in Helsinki, Finland. It was in circulation from 1981 to 2024.

== History and profile ==
Fakta was established in 1981 by the Finnish publisher A-lehdet Oy. Talentum Media Oy became its owner on 2 February 2004, and Talentum Media Oy, its subsidiary, began to publish the magazine. Fakta was based in Helsinki and provided news on leadership, management, supervisory work and development of organizations. The magazine was published on a monthly basis.

From 1998, Fakta cooperated with Harvard Business School and each issue offered a Harvard Management Update supplement covering articles translated from Harvard publications.

The Finnish Periodical Publisher's Association named the editors of Fakta as the editorial staff of the year in 2009. Heidi Hammarsten was the editor-in-chief of the magazine until August 2013 when Reijo Ruokanen was appointed to the post.

== See also ==
- List of magazines in Finland
