= Uusi Nainen =

Finnish political magazine (1945–2008)

- Categories: Political women's magazine
- Frequency: Monthly
- Publisher: Suomen Naisten Demokraattinen Liitton
- Founded: 1945
- Final issue: 2008
- Country: Finland
- Based in: Helsinki
- Language: Finnish
- ISSN: 0500-8476
- OCLC: 428441546

Uusi Nainen (Finnish: New Women) was a Finnish communist women's magazine published in Helsinki, Finland. The magazine existed between 1945 and 2008.

== History and profile ==
Uusi Nainen was established in 1945. The founder organization was Suomen Naisten Demokraattinen Liitton (SNDL; Finnish: Finnish Women's Democratic Organization). The aim of the SNDL was to reach Finnish women from different political orientations.

Uusi Nainen came out monthly. It overtly carried Soviet propaganda and was under the control of and financed by the Communist Party of Finland, which in turn, was closely related to the Communist Party of the Soviet Union. The magazine had a different approach in contrast to mainstream women's magazines in the 1960s which made the magazine a progressive alternative to the others. Because it was critical of fashion and commercial culture. However, its political focus diminished in 1966 and instead, it began to emphasize the ideological aspects of societal issues in an attempt to successfully compete with other women's magazines.

Uusi Nainen became the media outlet of Finnish Women's Democratic League in 1990. The circulation of the magazine was 66,000 copies in 1970 and 75,000 copies in 1980. Uusi Nainen folded in 2008.
