= Sarjakuvalehti =

Comics magazine in Finland

Sarjakuvalehti (Finnish for "comics magazine") was a Finnish comics magazine that was published from 1949 to 1963, from 1971 to 1977, from 1990 and 1996, and as Sarjakuvalehti Nastasarjat from 1964 to 1965. Under its first publication period, the magazine was published about twenty times annually, eight times in the 1970s and seven to twenty times in the 1990s. In the beginning, the pages in the magazine alternated between black-and-white and coloured. From the 1990s, the magazine became fully coloured.

Recurring series in the 1950s included Superman, Brick Bradford, Toot and Casper, Little Annie Rooney, Smokey Stover, Texas Slim and Dirty Dalton, Tim Tyler's Luck, Johnny Hazard, Terry and the Pirates, Lone Ranger, Flash Gordon, Mandrake, The Phantom and King of the Royal Mounted.

Recurring heroes in the 1970s were Kerry Drake and Steve Roper. The Marvel Comics superhero Ghost Rider made his first appearance in Finland in Sarjakuvalehti.

In the 1990s, the magazine featured the adventures of Marvel Comics' more "down-to-earth" characters (in the magazine staff's words), like the Punisher, Captain America, the Ghost Rider, and Sabretooth.
