= Kaunis Koti =

Finnish interior design magazine (1948–1971)

- Categories: Interior design magazine
- Frequency: Four to eight times annually
- Founded: 1948
- Final issue: 1971
- Country: Finland
- Language: Finnish

Kaunis Koti (Finnish: Beautiful Home) was the first interior design magazine in Finland which existed between 1948 and 1971.

== History and profile ==
Kaunis Koti was established in 1948 as the first professional Finnish magazine on interior design. Its first issue featured homes of Rut Bryk and Tapio Wirkkala. Later issues also published articles on homes of leading figures, including that of architect Jorma Järvi. The magazine came out 4 to 8 times a year. It adopted a rational modernist approach towards home decoration.

Eila Jokela was among the editors-in-chief of the magazine. Cover pages of Kaunis Koti mostly featured scenes from everyday life, nature and people. The magazine published informative advertisements, and the first commercials for home pools appeared in the magazine in 1966. It folded in 1971 when it merged with another interior design magazine Avotakka.
