= Koululainen =

Finnish children's magazine

- Editor: Elli Mäkilä, since October 2012
- Categories: Children's magazine
- Frequency: Monthly
- Circulation: almost 41200 (2006)
- Publisher: Otavamedia Oy
- First issue: 1944; 82 years ago
- Country: Finland
- Based in: Helsinki
- Language: Finnish
- Website: http://koululainen.fi/

Koululainen (Finnish: Schoolchild) is a Finnish magazine directed at children and youths. It has been in circulation since 1944.

== History and profile ==
Koululainen was founded in 1944. The magazine is published monthly by Otavamedia Oy and has its headquarters in Helsinki. The magazine is published monthly. The editor-in-chief of the magazine is Elli Mäkilä. The target audience is children age 7–12 years. It treats, among other things, schooling, music, books, pets and sport. The magazine also featured the story of a video game entitled Furry Dragons. In addition to articles, the magazine contains a variety of competitions. A special, thicker, issue called Räppäri, appears in the summer.
