= Avotakka =

Finnish interior design magazine

- Categories: Interior design magazine
- Frequency: Monthly
- Circulation: 71,911 (2013)
- Publisher: A-lehdet Oy
- Founded: 1967
- First issue: 1 December 1967; 57 years ago
- Company: A-lehdet Oy
- Country: Finland
- Based in: Helsinki
- Language: Finnish
- Website: Avotakka

Avotakka is a monthly Finnish interior design magazine published in Helsinki, Finland.

== History and profile ==
Avotakka was first published in December 1967. In 1971 it merged with an older Finnish design magazine Kaunis Koti [Finnish: Beautiful Home], which had first been published in 1948. At the time, the merger represented the combination of a more middle- and professional class magazine (Kaunis Koti) with a more populist magazine (Avotakka). The owner and publisher is A-lehdet Oy and the headquarters of the magazine is in Helsinki. It is published on a monthly basis.

As of 2011 the editor-in-chief of the magazine was Soili Ukkola.

== Circulation ==
In 2005 the annual circulation of Avotakka was 88,193 copies. Its circulation was 85,000 copies in 2007. In 2010 the magazine had a circulation of 85,104 copies. The 2011 circulation of the magazine was 85,431 copies. It fell to 82,245 copies in 2012 and to 71,911 copies in 2013.

== See also ==
- List of Finnish magazines
