= Tilanne =

Political magazine in Finland (1961–1967)

- Former editors: Jarno Pennanen
- Categories: Political magazine
- Frequency: Monthly
- Founded: 1961
- Final issue: 1967
- Country: Finland
- Based in: Helsinki
- Language: Finnish

Tilanne (Finnish: Situation) was a monthly leftist magazine published in Helsinki, Finland, in the period between 1961 and 1967. It was one of the magazines funded by the CIA through the Congress for Cultural Freedom (CCF) during the cultural Cold War.

== History and profile ==
Tilanne was started in Helsinki in 1961. The founders of the magazine were communist figures who left the Communist Party of Finland the same year. Its stated goal was to present a third way in the leftist ideology rejecting the dominant communist views. It billed itself as a socialist and humanist publication which attempted to explicitly define the way of Finland in achieving a socialist system theoretically and practically. The magazine also declared that it was a supporter of the independence of Finland. It was instrumental in introducing the European-based communist views to Finland.

Tilanne came out monthly. Although it announced that it would not accept any financial support if such a support would control its editorial approach, it was partially financed by the American national intelligence organization CIA, but it was not an official support. One of the editors-in-chief was the Finnish writer Jarno Pennanen. The magazine mostly featured materials and articles produced by the CCF figures. Tilanne folded in 1967.
