= Urkki (magazine) =

Finnish men's magazine (1974-1983)

- Categories: Men's magazine
- Founded: 1974
- Final issue: 1983
- Country: Finland
- Language: Finnish

Urkki was a Finnish language men's magazine that was in circulation between 1974 and 1983. The magazine was started with the subtitle of "the world's magazine" as a Finnish edition of the Danish magazine Ugens Rapport. The title of the magazine, Urkki, was a reference to the Finnish President of the period, Urho Kekkonen.

Urkki mostly featured masculine oriented topics such as war adventures and news from other countries and did not focus on nude models or sexual content. Following the established tradition for the Finnish men's magazines that were launched after World War II the magazine employed a sarcastic approach towards reporting domestic politics.

In 1979 the magazine had a total of 238,000 readers of whom 38,000 were women. At the beginning of the 1980s it was one of four best-selling men's magazines in Finland along with Jallu, Kalle and Ratto.

A climbing route in Gritstoneberget, a wall section on the northern part of Ällmoraberget, Sweden, was named after Urkki.
