= Lumooja =

Finnish cultural and literary magazine

- Categories: Cultural and literary magazine
- Publisher: Kapustarinta
- Founded: 2000
- Country: Turku
- Based in: Helsinki
- Language: Finnish
- Website: Lumooja

Lumooja is a Finnish cultural and literary magazine based in Turku, Finland. It features poetry and other literary work as well as articles on arts and book reviews.

== History and profile ==
Lumooja was started in 2000. The magazine is published by a Turku-based organization, Kapustarinta (The Golden Plover Association). From 2000 to 2001 Jenni Elina Haukio, the wife of Sauli Niinistö, Finnish President, was the editor of Lumooja. Heidi Laine also served in the post, who was appointed to the post in 2007. Elina Laine is the editor-in-chief of the magazine.
