= Moottori =

Automobile magazine published in Finland

- Editor: Eila Parviainen
- Frequency: Ten times per year
- Circulation: 108,742 (2013)
- Publisher: Aikakauslehdet Oy
- Founded: 1925
- Company: Yhtyneet Kuvalehdet Oy
- Country: Finland
- Based in: Helsinki
- Language: Finnish
- Website: Moottori official site

Moottori (meaning Engine in English) is the oldest automobile magazine published in Helsinki, Finland.

== Profile ==
Moottori is published ten times per year by Aikakauslehdet Oy. The magazine has its headquarters in Helsinki. It is the member magazine of the Automobile and Touring Club of Finland (ATCF) (in Finnish Autoliitto). The magazine has car tests, travel articles and articles on Finnish traffic policy.

The circulation of Moottori was 83,000 copies in 2007. It was 92,208 copies in 2009. Its circulation rose to 102,497 copies in 2011 and to 103,914 copies in 2012. The magazine had a circulation of 108,742 copies in 2013.

== See also ==
- List of magazines in Finland
