= Tuli & Savu =

Poetry magazine in Helsinki, Finland

- Editor-in-chief: Atte Koskinen
- Categories: Poetry magazine
- Frequency: Quarterly
- Publisher: Nihil Interit
- Founded: 1994
- Country: Finland
- Based in: Helsinki
- Language: Finnish
- Website: https://www.tulijasavu.net/
- ISSN: 1239-9213
- OCLC: 476297424

Tuli & Savu (Finnish: Fire & Smoke) is a poetry magazine based in Helsinki, Finland. It has been in circulation since 1994.

== History and profile ==
Tuli & Savu was established in 1994. The magazine comes out four times a year. Its publisher is the poetry association Nihil Interit. The magazine features poems by both Finnish and international poets. It mostly features modernist and experimental poetry. It also covers poetry criticism and other literary-related essays.

Tuli & Savu received the prize of the Association of Finnish Critics in 1998 and is the recipient of the quality magazine award of Kultti ry, the Finnish association of magazines, in 2018. It was named as the best cultural magazine in the Nordic countries at the Gothenburg Book Fair in 2019. The magazine was awarded the Finnish State Prize for Literature in 2021.

== Editors-in-chief ==
Markus Jääskeläinen is the founding editor-in-chief of Tuli & Savu whose tenure lasted until 1996. The others who held the post include Ilkka Koponen (1996–1997), Tuomo Karhu (1998–2000), Johanna Venho (2000), Rita Dahl and Janna Kantola (2001–2002), Leevi Lehto (2002–2003), Miia Toivio (2003–2006), Teemu Manninen (2006–2007), Harry Salmenniemi (2007–2008), Henriikka Tavi and Mikael Brygger (2008–2010), Kristian Blomberg and Mikael Brygger (2010–2013), Pauli Tapio, Tiina Lehikoinen and Jouni Teittinen (2013–2014), Tiina Lehikoinen and Jouni Teittinen (2014–2015), Anna Tomi and Vesa Rantama (2016–2017), Juha-Pekka Kilpiö (2018–2021), Riikka Simpura and Paavo Kässi (2021–2022) and Riikka Simpura and Atte Koskinen (2023). Koskinen was appointed to the post in 2024.
