= Katso =

Finnish television magazine

- Editor: Kirsi Lindh-Mansikka
- Categories: TV magazine Celebrity magazine
- Frequency: Weekly
- Circulation: 27,543 (2013)
- First issue: 1960; 65 years ago
- Company: Aller Media Oy
- Country: Finland
- Based in: Helsinki
- Language: Finnish
- Website: www.katso.fi
- ISSN: 0355-2969

Katso is a Finnish weekly television magazine published by Aller Media Oy in Finland. The Finnish word katso means "look!".

== History and profile ==
Katso started in 1960 as a TV guide, but in 2003 extended to entertainment and celebrity gossip. For a short period after its 2003 renovation, the magazine was known as Katso! and was issued two times a week. In 2008 it reverted to being a TV guide abandoning all gossip journalism and focusing on inside views on television programs.

Katso is part of Aller Media and is published weekly by Aller Media Oy. The company acquired the magazine in 2006. The weekly is based in Helsinki.

In the 1960s the magazine was very influential in shaping the early Finnish television context. Katso presents the annual Telvis television award.

== Circulation ==
In 2002 the circulation of Katso was 70,388 copies. Its circulation was 72,741 copies in 2006 and 63,000 copies in 2007. The 2011 circulation of the weekly was 27,979 copies. In 2013 Katso had a circulation of 27,543 copies.
