= Vene (magazine) =

Finnish monthly boat magazine

Venelogo

Vene (Finnish: Boat) is a Finnish language boating magazine based in Helsinki, Finland. The magazine is owned by Otava Media and published by Otavamedia Oy. It is published twelve times per year and targets those who have interest in water sports. It covers articles providing new ideas for upcoming boat trips, equipment refurbishment or equipment related to the water sports.
