= Tiede (magazine) =

Finnish popular science magazine

- Editor: Jukka Ruukki
- Categories: Popular science magazine
- Frequency: Monthly
- Circulation: 57,566 (2013)
- Founded: 1980; 45 years ago
- Company: Sanoma Magazines
- Country: Finland
- Based in: Helsinki
- Language: Finnish
- Website: www.tiede.fi
- ISSN: 1457-9030

Tiede (Finnish for "science") is a Finnish popular science magazine published monthly in Helsinki, Finland.

== History and profile ==
Tiede was first published in 1980. Until the year 2000 it was known as Tiede 2000. It is published by Sanoma Media and is based in Helsinki. The magazine is published monthly.

Tiede covers articles on popular science, research and technology.

The circulation of Tiede was 63,117 copies in 2010. In 2011 the magazine had a circulation of 62,678 copies. It was 60,951 copies in 2012. The 2013 circulation of the monthly was 57,566 copies.
