= Pirkka (magazine) =

Finnish consumer magazine

- Categories: Consumer magazine
- Frequency: Ten times a year
- Publisher: Dialogi
- Founded: 1933; 93 years ago
- Company: K-Plus Oy
- Country: Finland
- Based in: Helsinki
- Language: Finnish
- Website: Pirkka

Pirkka is a Finnish language consumer magazine published in Helsinki, Finland. It has existed since 1933.

== History and profile ==
Pirkka was established in 1933. The magazine is part of K-Plus Oy, a subsidiary of the K-food stores. The publisher is the Dialogi, a subsidiary of A-Lehdet. It is a free magazine and is delivered to homes. Riitta Korhonen served as the editor-in-chief of the magazine, which has its headquarters in Helsinki.

Pirkka is published ten times a year and provides cooking recipes and practical ideas about interior decoration, renovation, building, clothing, beauty care and hobby interests.

== Circulation ==
Pirkka had a circulation of 1,482,000 copies in 2007. In 2010 the magazine had over 2.9 million readers and the same year its circulation was 1,720,000 copies. It was the most read magazine in the country in 2012 with a readership of 2,912,000 people.

== See also ==
- List of magazines in Finland
