= Tiedepolitiikka =

Scientific journal in Finland

- Discipline: Science
- Language: Finnish
- Edited by: Kari Kuoppala

Publication details
- History: 1997-present
- Publisher: Edistyksellinen tiedeliitto (Finland)
- Frequency: Quarterly

Standard abbreviations
- ISO 4: Tiedepolitiikka

Indexing
- ISSN: 0782-0674

Links
- Journal homepage

Tiedepolitiikka (Finnish: The Science Policy) is a Finnish language peer-reviewed scientific journal published four times a year. The publisher is the Edistyksellinen tiedeliitto (Finnish Association for Progressive Science). The journal focuses on the topics of science, higher education, research and technology. Kari Kuoppala is the editor-in-chief of Tiedepolitiikka which is based in Helsinki, Finland.
