= Euterpe (magazine) =

Cultural magazine published in Finland (1900–1905)

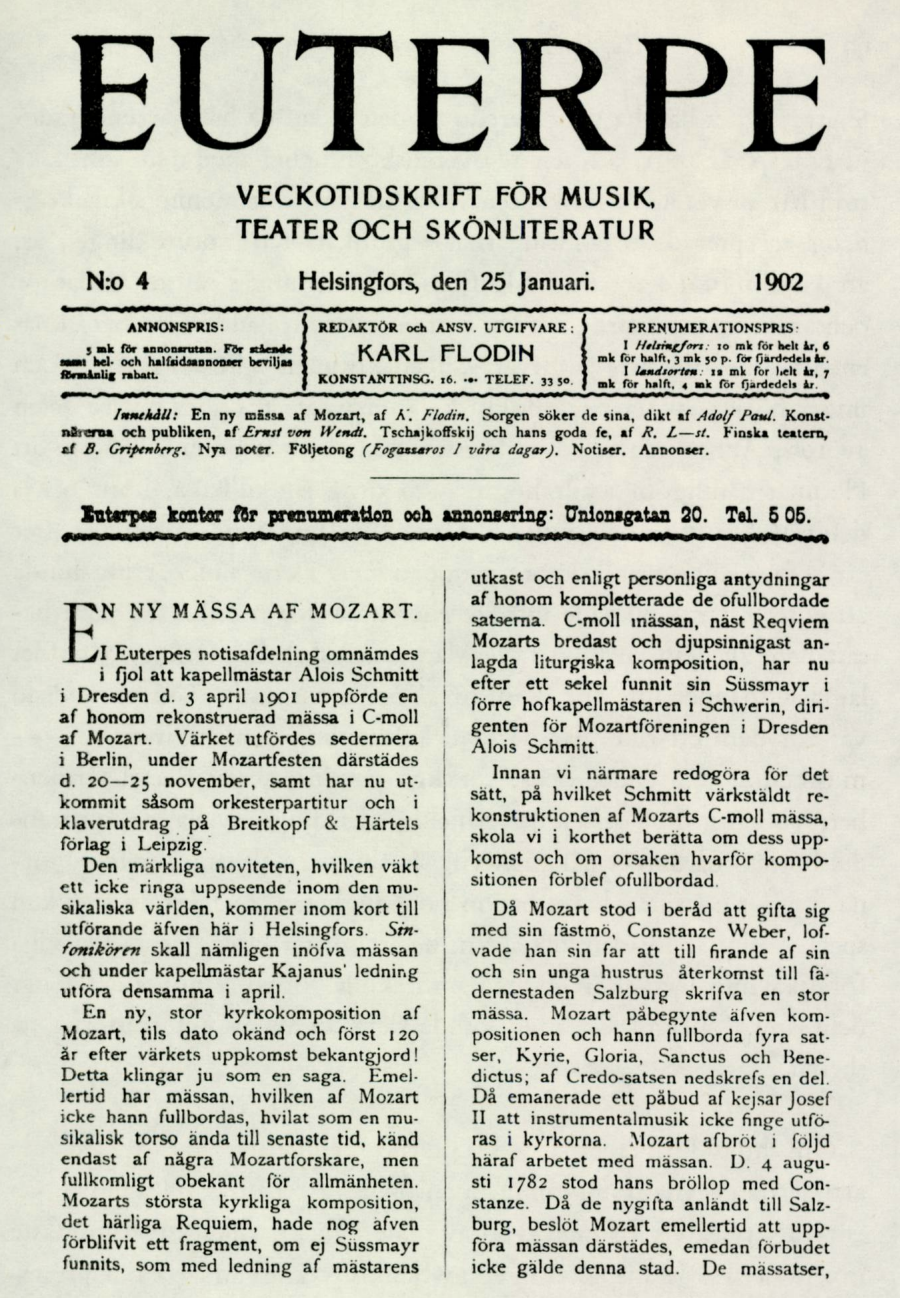
- Categories: Music magazine; Theatre magazine; Literary magazine
- Frequency: Weekly
- Founded: 1900
- Final issue: 31 December 1905
- Country: Finland
- Based in: Helsinki
- Language: Swedish

Euterpe was a weekly music, theatre and literary magazine which appeared in Helsinki between 1900 and 1905. It was the first Swedish-language music-oriented magazine published in Finland. Its subtitle was Veckotidskrift for musik, teater och skönlitteratur (Swedish: A weekly magazine for music, theatre and literature).

== History and profile ==
Euterpe was first published in 1900 to report the recent developments in European art and philosophy to the readers living in Finland and Sweden. The magazine was headquartered in Helsinki. It was a publication of the Swedish-speaking Finnish intellectuals such as Emil Hasselblatt, Werner Söderhjelm and Jean Sibelius. The magazine had a European orientation, being close to the French thought.

Euterpe came out weekly and featured articles on music, theatre and literature written in Swedish. However, in the first two years the magazine exclusively contained articles on music with a special reference to romanticism and introduced the new generation of Nordic composers, including Carl Nielsen. Later its focus on music decreased, and in its last year the magazine did not cover any music-related article. It was one of rare publications in Finland which included articles on the Dreyfus affair.

The last issue of Euterpe appeared on 31 December 1905. It was succeeded by another Swedish magazine entitled Finsk Musikrevy (Swedish: Finnish Music Review).
