= Dominique (album) =

Studio album by Neøv
- Released: February 20, 2015
- Genre: Indie rock, indie pop, dream pop, shoegaze, art rock, post rock
- Label: Fullsteam Records, Sony Music Finland
- Producer: Anssi Neuvonen

Neøv chronology
Orange Morning (2013)	Dominique (2015)

Professional ratings
Review scores
Source	Rating
Soundi	5/5 stars
NBHAP	4.6 stars on a 5 point scale
Rumba	9/10 stars
Savon Sanomat	4/5 stars
Keskisuomalainen	4/5 stars

Dominique is the second studio album by the Finnish indie rock band Neøv, released on February 20, 2015 on Fullsteam Records. The album received highly positive reviews. Dominique produced four singles: "Laketown", "The Rain People", "Dominique I" and "Woolen Pumpkin Shirt".

For the bandleader and songwriter Anssi Neuvonen Dominique was the debut work as a record producer. The music videos for album’s singles were directed by Appu Jasu of a Finnish indie band The New Tigers.

In interviews with Savon Sanomat and Nordic Playlist, Anssi Neuvonen has said that Dominique is an album about love.

== Critical reception ==
Dominique received highly positive reviews from music critics. Finnish music magazine Soundi gave it a score of 5/5 and wrote that band’s "aura is exceptionally strong." Another Finnish music magazine Rumba gave it a score of 9/10 and wrote that Dominique is "one of the best pop/rock albums of the year." German webzine NBHAP gave Dominique a score of 4.6/5 and praised band’s "own version of dream pop". Finnish newspapers Savon Sanomat and Keskisuomalainen stated that "at the moment NEØV is the best Finnish band in its form of art."

== Track listing ==
All songs written by Anssi Neuvonen.

1. "Aurora" – 4:42
2. "Laketown" – 4:09
3. "Woolen Pumpkin Shirt" – 4:38
4. "Dominique I" – 5:35
5. "The Rain People" – 3:54
6. "Clouds On The Wall" – 4:59
7. "Garden Road Sphere" – 5:28
8. "Dominique II" – 8:17
9. "Bengal Fires" – 3:59

== Personnel ==
The following persons were included in the making of Dominique.

NEØV

- Anssi Neuvonen - vocals, guitar, keyboards, trumpet, production
- Samuli Neuvonen - drums, trombone, backing vocals
- Ari Autio - bass, keyboards
- Jonas Ursin - guitar, keyboards
- Antti Hevosmaa - trumpet, flugelhorn, backing vocals

Additional personnel

- Sampsa Väätäinen - recording, mixing
- Jaakko Viitalähde - mastering
- Anka Zhuravleva - illustration (front cover)
- Appu Jasu - cover art
