= Neøv =

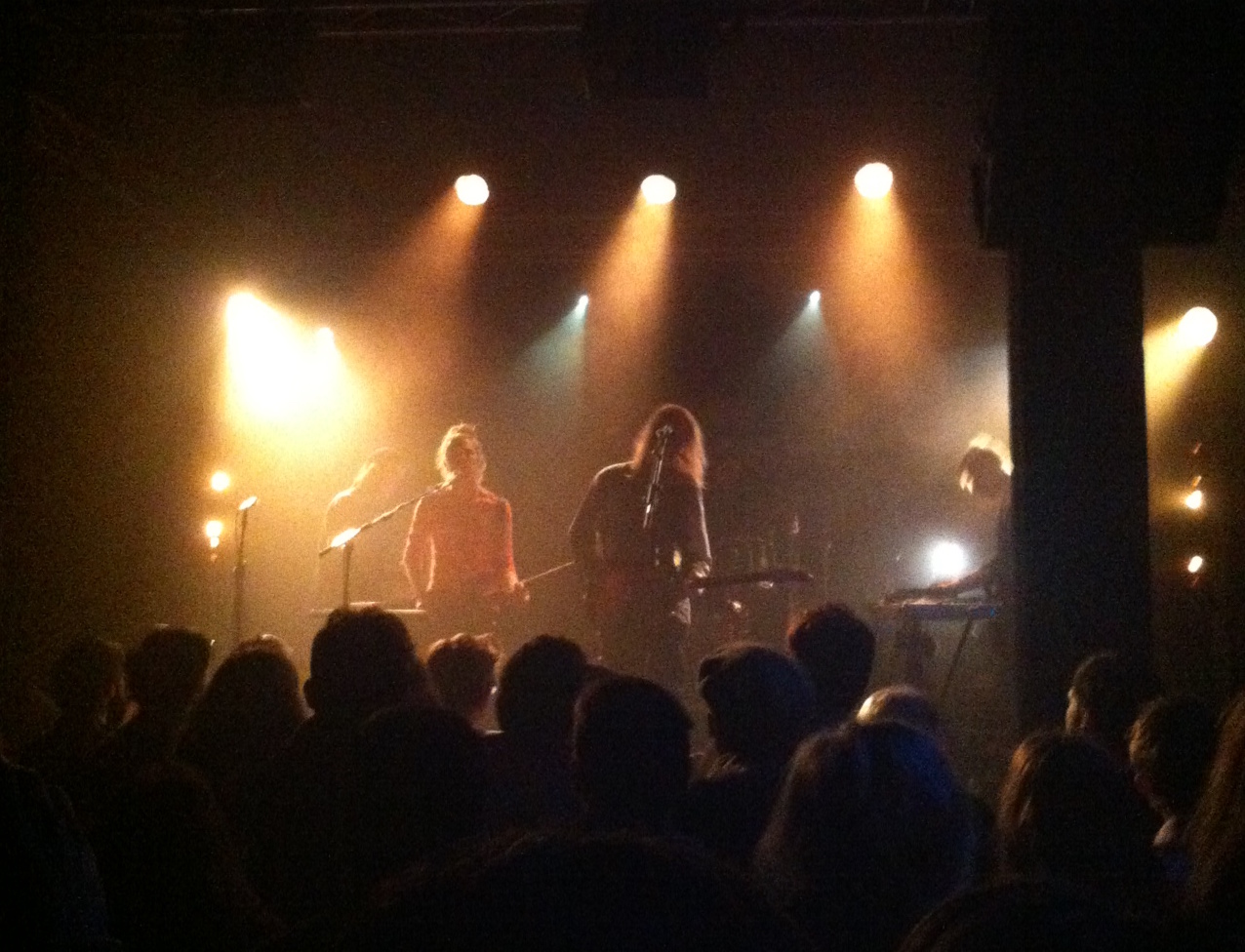
- NEØV performing at Air d’Islande Festival at Point Éphémère in Paris, France in January 2015.

Background information
- Also known as: Neufvoin
- Origin: Juankoski, Eastern Finland, Kuopio, Eastern Finland
- Genres: Indie rock, indie pop, dream pop, shoegaze, art rock, post rock
- Years active: 2008–present
- Labels: Clouds Hill, Fullsteam Records, New Music Community
- Members: Anssi Neuvonen; Samuli Neuvonen; Jussi Hietala (live member)
- Past members: Jonas Ursin; Antti Hevosmaa; Aaro Sariola; Ari Autio
- Website: neovband.com

Neøv is a Finnish indie rock band which has released five studio albums and performed in numerous countries.

Neøv consists of two brothers, Anssi Neuvonen (vocalist/guitarist, songwriter/producer) and Samuli Neuvonen (drummer).

Neøv's music has been characterized as dreamy indie rock, being expansive and intimate at the same time. The band has received praise especially for their songwriting, melodies and multi-faceted instrumentations, which are often formed by intensive rhythms, layered guitars, dozed keyboards and delicate vocals. The band is signed to German label Clouds Hill.

== History ==
=== Early history ===
Brothers Anssi and Samuli Neuvonen grew up in Juankoski, Eastern Finland. They started to make music together in their childhood. After moving to Kuopio, Eastern Finland they formed a band Neufvoin with Ari Autio, Jonas Ursin and Aaro Sariola. Neufvoin performed live for the first time as a warm up act for Finnish indie rock band Rubik in January 2008. The first studio releases of Neufvoin, Robokop EP (2009) and Fake Musket EP (2010) got positive reviews and sold out. The biggest Finnish newspaper Helsingin Sanomat, radio station YleX and music magazine Rumba listed the band among the most promising Finnish artists. In spring 2011 Neufvoin performed at SPOT Festival in Denmark.

In several interviews, the bandleader Anssi Neuvonen has stated that band's early name Neufvoin was their family's old last name in 19th century Ladoga Karelia.

In spring 2012 band's line-up changed, while Aaro Sariola left the group and Antti Hevosmaa joined in. In 2012 Neufvoin performed in Canada, Finland, France and Germany. In September 2012 the band announced that it has changed its name to NEØV and signed a recording deal with Finnish record label Fullsteam Records.

In 2012 the band started to organize their own annual festival Gramofon Fest in Kuopio.

=== Orange Morning ===
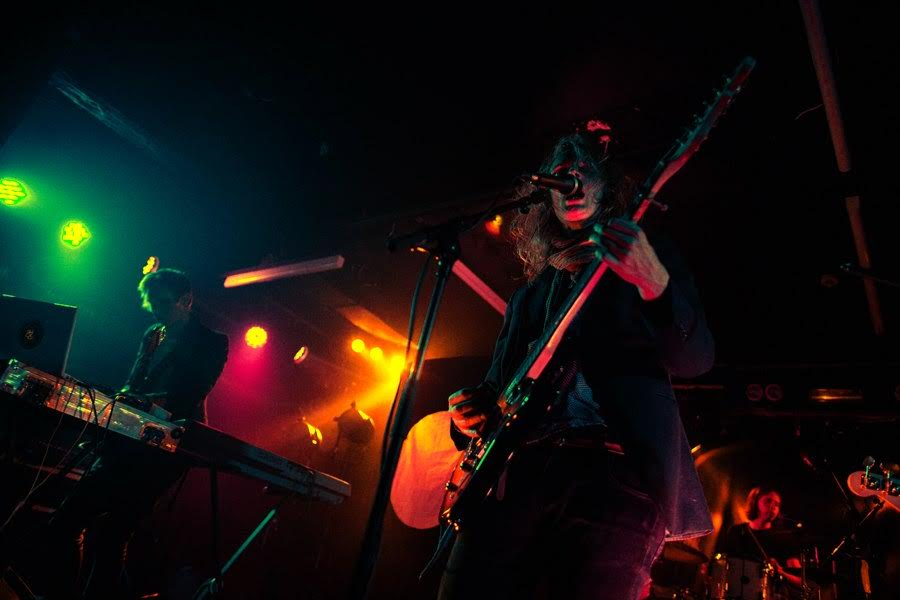
NEØV performing in February 2013.

NEØV's debut album, Orange Morning, was released in February to a much critical acclaim. Finnish music magazine Sue selected the album among the 10 best Finnish albums of 2013. A German webzine NBHAP stated that NEØV is "one of the most promising new bands from Scandinavia".

The songs of Orange Morning were mostly written by Anssi Neuvonen in several parts of Europe and North America. Some of the songs were written in collaboration between brothers Anssi and Samuli Neuvonen.

After the release of Orange Morning, NEØV toured in Finland and performed in Estonia and Belgium.

=== Dominique ===
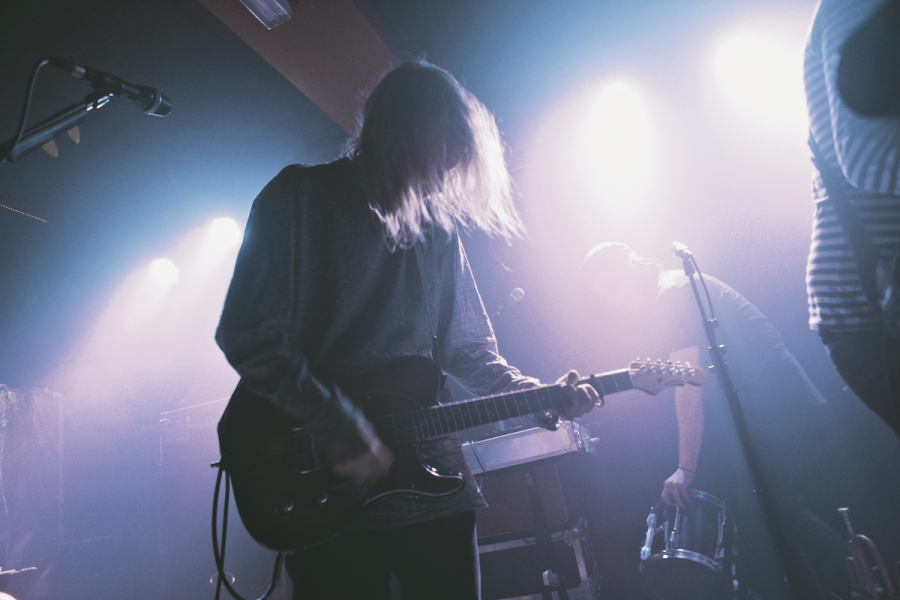
NEØV at The Lexington in London, UK in September 2014.

”Laketown" and "The Rain People", the first singles from band's second studio album, Dominique, were released in 2014. NEØV performed in Germany and The UK to support the singles, and Q Magazine and Rolling Stone noticed the band.

The band's second studio album, Dominique, was released in February 2015. For the bandleader and songwriter Anssi Neuvonen Dominique was the debut work as a record producer. The album received highly positive reviews from music critics. Finnish music magazine Rumba wrote that Dominique is "one of the best pop/rock albums of the year." German webzine NBHAP praised band's "own version of dream pop". After the album release NEØV toured in Europe (shows in Finland, France, Germany, Netherlands, Latvia, Sweden and Switzerland were included).

In interviews with Savon Sanomat and Nordic Playlist, Anssi Neuvonen has said that Dominique is an album about love.

In several interviews, the bandleader Anssi Neuvonen has stated that the band name NEØV doesn't mean anything. According to him, the word NEØV is "abstract", "stream of consciousness" and "as absurd as life". Neuvonen said to a German music blog Bedroomdisco that the band's name is related to his and Samuli's last name. At the same time, he saw the name as "neutral" and stated that it symbolizes their music for them.

=== Volant ===
In 2017, NEØV announced that they're continuing as a trio, while Jonas Ursin and Antti Hevosmaa left the group. In spring 2018, NEØV performed at Tallinn Music Week and at a sold-out club show in Berlin.

In June 2018, the band was signed to a Hamburg-based label Clouds Hill. The four singles, "Elysion", "Person I Used To Be", "Lost In Time", and "Brothers", gained radio airplay in Finland and German-speaking Europe. At Reeperbahn Festival 2019, NEØV played five shows in two days, including a sold-out show at Molotow Club.

Volant was released in February 2019. On an extensive release tour, the band performed in Finland, Denmark, Czech Republic and Germany, as well as on German television. Volant received glowing reviews around Europe. Suomen Kuvalehti praised band's songwriting and stated that NEØV's music is "the opposite of the rowdiness and the hustle of our time". A German music site Bedroomdisco reviewed the album with full five stars, and IndieBerlin praised band's Berlin show. A Danish music site Regnsky wrote that NEØV is the biggest indie pop name in Finland at the moment, and compared the band leader Anssi Neuvonen to Jannis Makrigiannis of Choir of Young Believers.

In interviews, Anssi Neuvonen has said that the lyrics of the album deals with passing of time, relationships, friendship, brotherhood, self-deception and guilt.

=== Picture of a Good Life ===
In November 2019, NEØV announced that a long-time bassist Ari Autio is leaving the band. It was also revealed that Anssi and Samuli Neuvonen were recording a new album in Hamburg with Sebastian Muxfeldt (Teenage Fanclub, Elbow) and the band will continue touring with a new live lineup.

“Marathon”, “Burnt My Fingers” and “Island”, three singles from NEØV’s fourth album, Picture of a Good Life, were released in late 2020. The full-length album came out in January 2021. Due to the COVID-19 pandemic, the band had to cancel their album release tour but performed on German TV on the album release day. In March 2021, NEØV played live for the first time with their new live bassist Jussi Hietala (J.Tala, Underwater Sleeping Society, Rubik, Pariisin Kevät) in Live Pictures streaming concert. The session produced three live videos.

Picture of a Good Life received highly positive reviews and considerable radio airplay. Austria’s biggest newspaper, Kronen Zeitung, wrote that “NEØV is ready for Champions League of indie pop”. Germany’s biggest music magazine VISIONS reviewed the album positively, and several Finnish critics saw it as NEØV’s best album that far. Finnish music magazine Soundi wrote that Samuli Neuvonen’s role as a drummer is “exceptionally pivotal” and praised Anssi Neuvonen’s guitar playing. Singles “Island” and “Captured Images”, an out-take from the Hamburg session released in 2022, made it to A-playlist of Radio Eins Germany and were among radio station’s most air-played tracks of 2021 and 2022.

According to songwriter Anssi Neuvonen, Picture of a Good Life is related to a paradox of good life: “All of us are surrounded by pictures of good lives, and we constantly present pictures of our own lives. But are we really living our lives or are we presenting ourselves in a picture of how we wish our lives to be?”

In autumn 2021, NEØV played sold-out comeback shows in Helsinki and Tampere. In 2022 and 2023, NEØV toured in Germany, Finland, Sweden and Estonia.

=== Soft Atlas ===
In March 2023, NEØV announced that they were recording a new album with Birgir Jón Birgisson (Sigur Rós, Jon Hopkins, Björk) at Sundlaugin studio in Mosfellsbær, Iceland. The album, entitled Soft Atlas, was released on August 23rd 2024.

== Discography ==
=== Neøv ===
==== Albums ====
Orange Morning (2013, Fullsteam Records)
Dominique (2015, Fullsteam Records, Sony Music Finland)
Volant (2019, Clouds Hill)
Picture of a Good Life (2021, Clouds Hill)
Soft Atlas (2024, Motor)

==== Singles ====
"Windvane" (2012)
"Morning Fire" (2012)
"Mellow" (2013)
"Daydream City" (2013)
"Laketown" (2014)
"The Rain People" (2014)
"Dominique I" (2014)
"Woolen Pumpkin Shirt" (2015)
"Elysion" (2018)
"Person I Used To Be" (2018)
"Lost In Time" (2019)
"Brothers" (2019)
"Marathon" (2020)
"Burnt My Fingers" (2020)
"Island" (2020)
"Captured Images" (2022)

=== Neufvoin ===
Robokop EP (2009, New Music Community)
Fake Musket EP (2010, New Music Community)
