= Orange Morning =

Studio album by Neøv
- Released: February 8, 2013
- Genre: Indie rock, indie pop, dream pop, shoegaze, art rock, post rock
- Label: Fullsteam Records
- Producer: Artturi Taira

Neøv chronology
Orange Morning (2013)	Dominique (2015)

Professional ratings
Review scores
Source	Rating
Soundi	4/5 stars
Prefix Magazine	8/10 stars
Savon Sanomat	4/5 stars
Keskisuomalainen	4/5 stars

Orange Morning is the first studio album by the Finnish indie rock band Neøv, released on February 8, 2013 on Fullsteam Records to a much critical acclaim.

The songs of Orange Morning were mostly written by Anssi Neuvonen in several parts of Europe and North America. Some of the songs were written in collaboration between brothers Anssi and Samuli Neuvonen. The music videos for singles of Orange Morning were directed by creative duo Rairai and award-winning director Teemu Niukkanen.

== Critical reception ==
Orange Morning received positive reviews from music critics. Finnish music magazine Soundi gave Orange Morning a score of 4/5 stating that the band has managed to capture their "dreamlike vision as a strikingly integrated whole." New York–based web magazine Prefix Magazine gave Orange Morning a grade of 8/10 and Finnish music magazine Sue 9/10. Sue selected the album among the 10 best Finnish albums of 2013. A German webzine NBHAP reviewed the album positively and stated that Neøv is "one of the most promising new bands from Scandinavia".

== Track listing ==
All songs written by Anssi Neuvonen, if not mentioned otherwise. Lyrics by Anssi Neuvonen.

1. "Faces Against Orange Rain" - 4:21 (by Anssi Neuvonen, Samuli Neuvonen)
2. "Daydream City" - 3:24 (by Anssi Neuvonen, Samuli Neuvonen)
3. "Windvane" - 4:13
4. "A Fall Through The Roofs" (by Anssi Neuvonen, Samuli Neuvonen) - 4:56
5. "Morning Fire" - 4:34
6. "Mellow" - 6:02
7. "1999" - 5:34
8. "Otherworld" - 6:07
9. "Whale Hymn" - 7:30

== Personnel ==
The following persons were included in the making of Orange Morning.

NEØV
Anssi Neuvonen - vocals, guitar, keyboards, trumpet
Samuli Neuvonen - drums, trombone, keyboards, backing vocals
Ari Autio - bass, keyboards, backing vocals
Jonas Ursin - keyboards, guitar
Antti Hevosmaa - trumpet, flugelhorn

Additional personnel
Artturi Taira - production, recording, keyboards
Sampsa Väätäinen - recording, mixing, whistle
Neøv - additional recording
Aaro Sariola - keyboards
Henkka Niemistö - mastering
Rairai - artwork
