= Big business =

Large-scale corporate organization

Big business involves large-scale corporate-controlled financial or business activities. As a term, it describes activities that run from "huge transactions" to the more general "doing big things". In corporate jargon, the concept is commonly known as enterprise, or activities involving enterprise customers.

The concept first rose in a symbolic sense after 1880 in connection with the combination movement that began in American business at that time. The latter half of the 19th century saw more technological advances and corporate growth in additional sectors, such as petroleum, machinery, chemicals, and electrical equipment (see Second Industrial Revolution).

In the sphere of enterprise software, beyond the functional level, an enterprise edition would emphasize institutional concerns around software security, fault tolerance, geographic redundancy, disaster recovery, dispersed operational collaboration with administrative teams large enough to have internal sub-departments, and multilingual and localized functionality that spans the global marketplace. Procurement, validation and regulatory compliance of large systems at the enterprise scale often involves a multi-year planning cycle.

== History ==
=== Origin of term ===
The Oxford English Dictionary identifies the first use of the term, in 1905, to be in The City: The Hope of Democracy, by progressive reformer Frederic C. Howe.

=== Early 20th century ===
The automotive industry began modestly in the late-19th century, but grew rapidly following the development of large-scale gasoline production in the early 20th century.

==== Post-World War II ====
The relatively stable period of rebuilding after World War II led to new technologies (some of which were spin-offs from the war years) and new businesses.

===== Computers =====
The new technology of computers spread worldwide in the post war years. Businesses built around computer technology include: IBM, Microsoft, Apple Inc., Samsung, and Intel.

===== Electronics =====
Miniaturization and integrated circuits, together with an expansion of radio and television technologies, provided fertile ground for business development. Electronics businesses include JVC, Sony (Masaru Ibuka and Akio Morita), and Texas Instruments (Cecil H. Green, J. Erik Jonsson, Eugene McDermott, and Patrick E. Chodery), while also the companies in the computer-section above can be considered electronics.

===== Energy =====
Nuclear power was added to fossil fuel as the main sources of energy.

== Criticism ==
The social consequences of the concentration of economic power in the hands of those persons controlling "big business" has been a constant concern both of economists and of politicians since the end of the 19th century. Various attempts have been made to investigate the effects of "bigness" upon labor, consumers, and investors, as well as upon prices and competition. "Big business" has been accused of a wide variety of misdeeds that range from the exploitation of the working class to the corruption of politicians and the fomenting of war. Attitudes toward big business have fluctuated; Americans generally had a favorable view of big business in the 1950s, which would worsen drastically in a generation later.

=== Influence over government ===
Corporate concentration can lead to influence over government in areas such as tax policy, trade policy, environmental policy, foreign policy, and labor policy through lobbying. In 2005, the majority of Americans believed that big business has "too much power in Washington."

== See also ==
- Almighty dollar
- Big Alcohol
- Big Chocolate
- Big data
- Big government
- Big media
- Big Oil
- Big Pharma
- Big Science
- Big Soda
- Big Tech
- Big Tobacco
- Conglomerate
- Corporatocracy
- Evil corporation
- Fat cat
- Fortune Global 500
- Keiretsu
- Major film studios
- Megacorporation
- Small business
- Wall Street
- Zaibatsu
