= Big Pharma (artist) =

- Birth name: Jussi Ylikoski
- Origin: Finland
- Genres: Dance-punk; electro house; electronic punk; indietronica; new rave; big beat
- Occupation: Producer
- Instrument(s): Guitar, bass, drums, keyboards, vocals
- Years active: 2015–present
- Labels: Fullsteam, Sony Music Finland

Big Pharma (born Jussi Ylikoski) is a Helsinki-based electronic music producer. He is also known as the guitarist of Disco Ensemble which is one of the most internationally hyped Finnish bands in the 2000s. Big Pharma's first single "Freedom Juice" was released in May 2015. The debut album Freedom Juice was released on April 1, 2016. There are many guest appearances on the album, e.g. Ville Malja from Lapko.

== Discography ==
Singles

- Freedom Juice (May 2015)
- United By The Night feat. Ville Malja (September 2015)
- Bloods Unite feat. Ringa Manner (November 2015)
- Fucking Live It Up feat. Miikka Koivisto (December 2015)
- Midnight Call (January 2016)
- Suburban Trap (March 2016)

Albums

- Freedom Juice (April 2016)

Videos

- Freedom Juice
- United By The Night feat. Ville Malja
- Fucking Live It Up feat. Miikka Koivisto
- Midnight Call
- Suburban Trap
