= Big Tobacco =

Collective term for the largest global tobacco companies

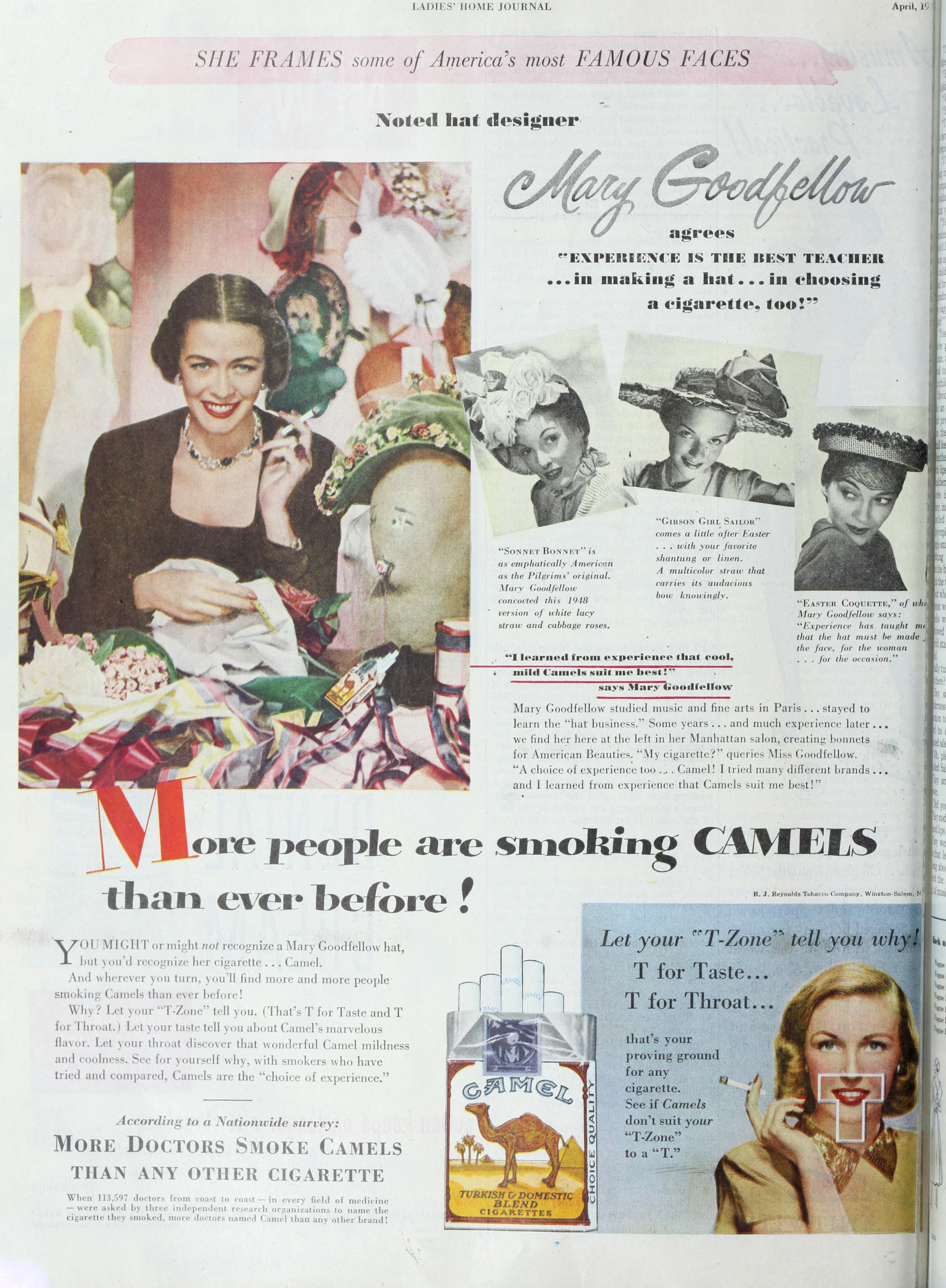
Example of the tobacco industry marketing to women

Big Tobacco is a name used to refer to the largest companies in the tobacco industry. There are five that are normally included: Philip Morris International, British American Tobacco, Japan Tobacco, Imperial Brands, and China Tobacco. Altria, which only sells in the United States, is also one of the largest tobacco companies.

The label draws a parallel to similar classifications in other industries, such as Big Tech, Big Oil, Big Soda, or Big Pharma.

== Overview ==
According to the World Medical Journal, the five largest tobacco companies are:

- Philip Morris International, based in the United States and Switzerland
- British American Tobacco, based in the United Kingdom
- Japan Tobacco International, based in Switzerland
- Imperial Brands, based in the United Kingdom
- China Tobacco, based in China

Altria, which only operates in the United States, is also among the largest tobacco corporations worldwide.

These companies have substantial power economically, with revenues matching some small countries. These companies are well known for lobbying governments, advocating for looser restrictions and lower taxes.

These companies have garnered significant controversy for the product they produce and the tactics with which they sell and market them. Tobacco use is the leading cause of preventable death and disease in the United States. Despite a general decrease in cigarette use in the United States, there has been no change in the use of smokeless tobacco, which can also cause cancer.

Some of the tactics utilized by these companies have been noted to be similar to that of other industries such as the oil, sugar, and cell phone industries.

These companies are controversial due to the negative health effects of the products they produce, and attempts to misinform on this topic. In the United States, the big five tobacco companies have worked together to conceal scientific evidence on the negative effects of tobacco. There is also a history of manipulating and destroying evidence.

The Framework Convention on Tobacco Control was designed by the World Health Assembly as an international legal approach to reducing the effect of tobacco on public health. However, its implementation has also been interfered with by these tobacco companies. Tobacco companies have also been known to foster relations with governments and communities to maintain loose regulations on tobacco products.

== See also ==
- Tobacco politics
- Tobacco Master Settlement Agreement, a settlement reached in the United States in 1998
- Jeffrey Wigand, American biochemist and whistleblower
- Nicotine marketing
- "Big"—Big business, Big Media, Big Oil, Big Pharma, Big Soda, Big Tech
