= The Island of Disco Ensemble =

Studio album by Disco Ensemble
- Released: May 26, 2010
- Recorded: 2009–2010
- Genre: Punk rock Post-hardcore
- Length: 42:20
- Label: Fullsteam Records
- Producer: Lasse Kurki

Disco Ensemble chronology
Magic Recoveries (2008)	The Island of Disco Ensemble (2010)	Warriors (2012)

The Island of Disco Ensemble is the fourth studio album from Finnish post-hardcore band Disco Ensemble. On February 9, 2010, the band started their weekly video diary which showed what they were doing while creating the album. The album was released worldwide on the 26 May 2010. The album leans further towards electronica elements the band have been known to use as a regular addition to their sound, while maintaining their punk-rock, guitar-based songwriting formula and characteristic lyrics, seen particularly in previous two studio albums, First Aid Kit and Magic Recoveries. "White Flag for Peace", "Protector", "Lefty", and "Undo" were released as singles.

== Track listing ==
No.	Title	Length
1.	"Bay of Biscay"	3:47
2.	"Pitch Black Cloud"	3:36
3.	"White Flag for Peace"	2:35
4.	"Protector"	3:44
5.	"So Cold"	3:51
6.	"Get Some Sleep"	5:35
7.	"Life of Crime"	4:24
8.	"Semi Eternal Flame / Undo"	5:45
9.	"Lefty"	3:42
10.	"Samantha"	5:10

== Chart performance ==
Chart	Peak position
The Official Finnish Charts	2
