= Anssi Neuvonen =

- Born: Juankoski, Eastern Finland
- Genres: Indie rock, indie pop, dream pop, shoegaze, art rock, post rock
- Occupations: Musician, songwriter, record producer
- Instruments: Vocals, guitar, keyboards, trumpet
- Years active: 2008-present
- Labels: Clouds Hill, Fullsteam Records, New Music Community

Anssi Pekka Neuvonen is a Finnish songwriter, musician and producer. He is best known for being the frontman of indie rock band Neøv.

In addition to his work with Neøv, Neuvonen has played with several Finnish acts including Rubik.

Neuvonen has performed in the music video for ”City Wrecker” by Canadian singer-songwriter Moonface. He has also been a model for the fashion collection by Finnish designer Heikki Salonen.

Neuvonen has a Master of Arts degree from University of Eastern Finland. He wrote his master's thesis on Marcel Proust's art concept.

== Discography ==
=== Neøv ===
==== Albums ====
- Orange Morning (2013, Fullsteam Records)
- Dominique (2015, Fullsteam Records, Sony Music Finland)
- Volant (2019, Clouds Hill)
- Picture of a Good Life (2021, Clouds Hill)

==== Singles ====
- "Windvane" (2012)
- "Morning Fire" (2012)
- "Mellow" (2013)
- "Daydream City" (2013)
- "Laketown" (2014)
- "The Rain People" (2014)
- "Dominique I" (2014)
- "Woolen Pumpkin Shirt" (2015)
- "Elysion" (2018)
- "Person I Used To Be" (2018)
- "Lost In Time" (2019)
- "Brothers" (2019)
- "Marathon" (2020)
- "Burnt My Fingers" (2020)
- "Island" (2020)
- "Captured Images" (2022)

=== Neufvoin ===
- Robokop EP (2009, New Music Community)
- Fake Musket EP (2010, New Music Community)

=== Featuring ===
- Rubik - Data Bandits EPEPEP (2010, Fullsteam Records)
- Rubik - Solar (2011, Fullsteam Records)
- The Exploding Eyes Orchestra - I (2015, Svart Records)
- Jess and the Ancient Ones - Second Psychedelic Coming: The Aquarius Tapes (2015, Svart Records)
- J.Tala - Dustin' Archives Vol. 3 (2018, Music Kickup)

=== Performing ===
- Heikki Salonen - Headstock (fashion collection) (2013)
- Moonface - "City Wrecker" (music video) (2014, Jagjaguwar)
