= Valamo Monastery art sales scandal =

Criminal case in Finland

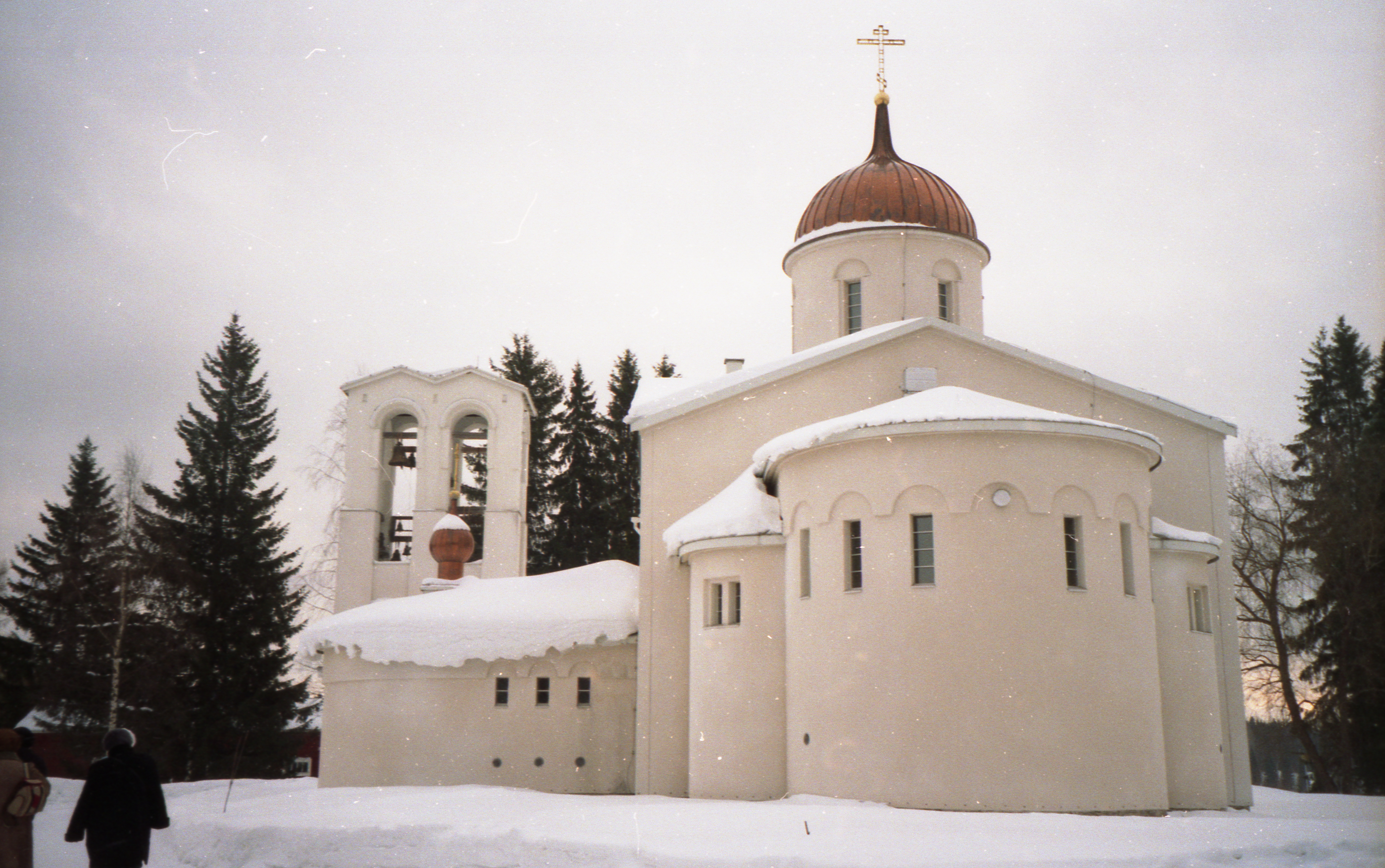
Valamo Monastery in Heinävesi, Finland.

In 2016 and 2017, the New Valamo Monastery in Heinävesi, Finland, attracted scandal for "selling mediocre works of art from a 'mysterious family' at outrageously high prices" and selling art forgeries to the public. Criminal convictions were brought against the main perpetrators.

According to the comment of Asta Tenhunen, a journalist for Savon Sanomat, "the exhibition scandal is a very serious matter in terms of how carelessly power and the use of a good name have been given to use by an outsider" in a national church, which has a special status in the state, for example with regard to legislation.

== Background ==
=== The Master's Imprint I ===
In 2014–15, the New Valamo Monastery hosted an art exhibition called "The Master's Imprint." It was a "major exhibition of Christian-themed art by Finnish masters," as Savon Sanomat wrote. Among the artists' names were Helene Schjerfbeck, Albert Edelfelt, Hugo Simberg, Juho Rissanen, and Akseli Gallen-Kallela. The exhibition was curated by Vicar Bishop Arseni. Arseni. He had selected 76 works on Biblical themes from "the private collection of an Eastern Finnish family". The exhibition's spokesperson was a certain Jussi Savolainen. According to him

This is not even a significant private collection, but a significant collection in Finnish terms. No museum has anything like it. The family's collections include over 200 works.

The exhibition attracted 7,300 visitors to Valamo, a record for exhibitions at the monastery. The owner family hoped that the exhibition would tour museums in Finland and possibly also abroad.

=== The Master's Imprint II ===
In September 2015, the next exhibition, "The Master's Imprint II", opened in Valamo, which continued until May Day, 2016. According to Savon Sanomat, the exhibition was "a huge all-time success" for the monastery. In April 2016, the exhibition was said to have seen by 13,000 visitors, more than any previous exhibition at the monastery. The exhibition was said to have been "a runaway hit". It was speculated that the 15,000 visitor mark might be broken. That would have equaled the number of visitors to the Kuopio Art Museum during the year. "The exhibition has significantly brightened up Valamo's quiet winter season. We have never had it this busy before", commented Jaana Nykänen, Sales and Marketing Manager at Valamo.

The success was visible in the monastery's finances. The monastery's father superior, Archimandrite Sergei, noted that "visitors to the exhibition also use the monastery's other services, they eat in the restaurant and buy souvenirs. Many also take guided tours and others stay overnight. That brings income to the monastery. I haven't looked into the exact amounts, but I know that the economy is now in the black". Jussi Savolainen served as the guide for the exhibition. The mystical art collector family's collections were said to include over 300 works of art, which were loaned to the exhibitions free of charge. "If similar works had been acquired on loan from elsewhere, the costs would have been enormous," Sergei said.

A bus company from Nilsiä was said to have transported hundreds of visitors from Savo to the monastery. The monastery had built a package around the exhibition, which included a guided exhibition, a welcome moment, a guided visit to the main church, meals, a wine tour and afternoon coffee. Almost all groups were said to buy the package.

Just two and a half weeks after this exhibition, a new exhibition, "Via Finlandia", was opened at the monastery, again featuring the collections of a mystical family of collectors.

== Via Finlandia exhibition ==
In mid-May 2016, the "Via Finlandia" exhibition opened in Valamo, with which the monastery wanted to celebrate the centennial of the Independence of Finland. The exhibition was again curated by Arseni, who had selected over 70 works for the exhibition. "You could start a museum with this collection," Arseni said in praise of the exhibition.

Again, the works came from the same family as in the previous exhibitions, but now they were for sale. Arseni had selected the works for the exhibition from among 300 works on offer, and the works were mainly not religious. However, it was said that the family now had 350 of these works. The collection of secular art was said to be even larger.

"It's not worth going out to the exhibition with a thin wallet," wrote Savon Sanomat, noting that the exhibition featured works by, among others, Akseli Gallen-Kallela, Juho Rissanen, Maria Wiik, Tyko Sallinen, Albert Edelfelt, Robert Wilhelm Ekman and Väinö Aaltonen, adding that "this art can not be bought for a pittance".

The cheapest works in the exhibition were said to cost 4,000 euros and the most expensive one 600,000 euros. It was also mentioned that there were "international treats" at the exhibition, works of graphic by Pablo Picasso, Matisse and Miró.

The exhibition was said to have attracted attention in advance. "Many guided tours have already been booked. Collectors from even abroad have been in touch", said a spokesman for the monastery. The monastery was said to receive a share of the sales proceeds, but how they would be distributed was a trade secret. However, according to Archimandrite Sergei, it was "a good sum".

Arseni praised the exhibition volubly:

The entire exhibition is a gem. For example, the works by R.W. Ekman, Tyko Sallinen, Rissanen and Edelfelt would be welcomed into the collection of any museum.

The organizers had already set their eyes on "Master's Imprint III" and "Via Finlandia II" exhibitions.

This time too, the condition for the exhibition was that the name of the owner family would remain a secret:

Making the name of the owners public would not add any value to the collection; on the contrary, it would lead people's interest to a completely wrong and insignificant matter and away from the purpose of the collection.

Helsingin Sanomat quoted Savon Sanomat as saying that the exhibition had been a "tremendous success": 18,000 guests had seen it.

== 2016–17 art sales ==
The works in "Via Finlandia" were for sale. The exhibition received a lot of attention in the media, including YLE, which reported on the "amazing art collection", Kotimaa, Savon Sanomat ("Buy your own Edelfelt from Valamo").

Later, the exhibition and the sale of the works of art received a lot of attention in Helsingin Sanomat, Savon Sanomat ja Yle TV News and other media, and in the book Operation Fake (Crime Time, 2024) by the now retired detective Kimmo Nokkonen.

The exhibition featured and sold works by many well-known Finnish artists. In addition to the artists mentioned earlier, the artists included Eero Järnefelt, Hugo Simberg, Kain Tapper. There were also internationally renowned artists such as Pablo Picasso, Marc Chagall, Salvador Dalí, Henri Matisse, Andy Warhol, and Rembrandt van Rijn.

=== Art origins ===
According to the monastery, the works were owned by an "Eastern Finnish family" who did not want their name be made public. The family was represented by Jussi Savolainen, who denied that the works belonged to him or his family members. However, in 2019, Helsingin Sanomat learned that the key works in the exhibition had been acquired by Jussi Savolainen and his wife Sari Tikkanen in the 2000s, many of the works at auctions. They had a habit of buying inexpensive works by well-known artists. The owner of the works was listed in the sales documents as Tikkanen's company, but this was reportedly due to "tax reasons". Neither the monastery nor Bishop Arseni agreed to reveal the true owner of the works. The monastery and the Philanthropy Association, which had been announced to channel the proceeds to the victims of the war in Syria, received a commission from the sales. Archbishop Leo served as the honorary chairman of the Philanthropy. Nokkonen says in his book Operaatio Fake that the monastery received a third of the proceeds from the sales exhibition.

In 2018, Turun Sanomat bluntly stated that the "family story" behind the exhibition had been fabricated.

More works from the Valamo "Via Finlandia" exhibition from the collections of a mysterious Eastern Finnish art collector family were sold in different locations in Finland at Orthodox church premises, e.g. in Pori and Lappeenranta.

=== Graphic art "prints" ===
Picasso's works in the exhibition included a lithograph depicting Jesus, among a few other Christian-themed works. Bishop Arseni stated in an interview published by YLE in September 2015 that Picasso's Christian-themed works were "a real curiosity" in his production. Nokkonen points out that Picasso was a well-known atheist, and his "three Christian-themed prints" were dated March 2, 1959, when he was almost 80 years old. Keskisuomalainen had said of one of the works that it was "a test print of a series of prints made from oil paintings." Nokkonen called a couple of experts, and it turned out that Picasso was not known to have made prints of his oil paintings. He got the impression that the sale included "works by Picasso that had never been seen before." Keskisuomalainen also said that "Picasso has adjusted the colours [of the work]." At Valamo, a visitor was told that "Picasso's Christian-themed works, previously unknown to art history, were created when Picasso experienced a brief religious awakening on March 2, 1959 and produced three Christian-themed lithographs."

The exhibition reported that Picasso's prints were test prints, in which the artist had adjusted the colours himself. The authenticity of the works was reportedly "verified by a French expert specializing in Picasso's graphics and that an appropriate guarantee certificate would be given to buyers of their authenticity." In his work, Nokkonen wonders that no one said who this "expert was and in whose name the certificates of authenticity were issued." Nokkonen also wonders, "how can an anonymous person guarantee anything at all?" Nor was it possible to draw any "conclusions about the size of the edition or the year of completion" based on the numbering of the work.

Nokkonen was in contact with people he considered experts, who believed that

The works signed in the name of Picasso, Matisse and Chagall were not genuine graphics but worthless prints from printing houses or inkjet prints. Despite the strong involvement of the Orthodox Church, there seemed to be a real scam going on. There was reason to suspect that counterfeit graphics were being sold in the Valamo Monastery and in exhibitions organized in various parts of Finland. It was obvious that several crimes had already been committed in this matter, and more would committed if the police did not intervene quickly.

=== Investigation into "graphic prints" ===
A day after the Turun Sanomat article, on May 7, Yle TV news reported that the graphic works by Picasso, Henri Matisse and Marc Chagall that were on sale at the exhibition, which had been sold as "test prints", were counterfeit inkjet prints. "We are investigating gross forgeries, counterfeiters and fraudsters," Detective Superintendent Kauko Kuismin told Yle. The National Gallery had examined eight works and found them to be inkjet prints, or fakes. Savolainen said that 10–20 of these works had been sold, worth perhaps 80,000 euros. Yle reported that Savolainen was one of the two suspects.

Regarding the Valamo prints, the National Bureau of Investigation was not interested in opening an investigation. However, a solution was found in the matter regarding the resale compensation for fine art. The resale royalty should be paid through the Copyright Information and Control Centre (TTVK) to the artist or, after his or her death, to the holder of rights for 70 years, i.e. as long as the copyright is valid. No such payments had been made from the Valamo sales exhibition. TTVK made a test purchase in Valamo, purchasing Aimo Kanerva's work for 3,300 euros. In the documents relating to the transaction, the ownership of the work was stated to be Saxton Oy, whose CEO, sole board member and shareholder was Sari Tikkanen, Jussi Savolainen's spouse. Saxton Oy had been engaged in professional art tradeg since at least 2003, but it had never paid anything to TTVK, which knew nothing about the existence of such a company.

Saxton's deadline for paying the TTVK was January 2017. When no payment was made, TTVK and Kuvasto filed a criminal report with the Eastern Finland Police Department. Now it was necessary to start an investigation.

Almost 30 works signed in the name of Picasso, Matisse and Chagall had been sold from Valamo and other exhibitions held in the premises of the Finnish Orthodox Church. Eight "graphic prints" were confiscated and examined by the National Gallery. The result of the investigation was that the prints in question were inkjet prints that could be dated to the years 1990–2010. All of the artists in question had died before this, so the signatures on the prints were forgeries.

During the trial, it emerged that Savolainen had purchased the "graphic prints" on eBay "from a person he considered trustworthy, Chris Brooks, who used the username 'brooksie2000' on the trading portal." Nokkonen believed it was clear that Savolainen had known from the beginning that the prints were forgeries. Jussi Savolainen and Sari Tikkanen were convicted of a total of 30 counts of fraud and forgery, and one instance of aggravated fraud.

=== Court cases ===
According to the decision issued by the North Savo Magistrate's Court on 3 April 2020 (Decision 20/113385, Case number R 19/420, pp. 88–90), Jussi Savolainen, born in 1965, was sentenced to 1 year and 6 months of suspended imprisonment for 30 crimes, which were fraud and forgery, including one aggravated fraud. Sari Tikkanen, born in 1964, was sentenced to 2 years of suspended imprisonment and a 3-year ban on business operations for 34 crimes, which were embezzlement, fraud, forgery, aggravated fraud, aggravated accounting crime, minor tax fraud, aggravated tax fraud (pp. 97–99).

The Eastern Finland Hovrätt heard the case in 2021. It upheld Savolainen's 1 year and 6 months suspended prison sentence, as well as Tikkanen's 2-year suspended sentence and her 3-year business ban. Of the defendants, Tikkanen tried to take the case to the Supreme Court, but the court refused to hear it.

=== Paintings by Finnish artists ===
Regarding the works by Finnish artists on sale at Valamo, experts interviewed by Helsingin Sanomat were of the opinion that the works on sale had been overpriced. They in no way represented the best works of the artists' catalogue. According to one expert, talk of "museum-quality" works was misleading to the buyers. Savolainen, on the other hand, claimed that auction houses do not know how to price art and sell it for the price of frames alone. Helsingin Sanomat, on the other hand, called overpricing "outrageous" in the headline of its web article.

The experts said that top works by Finnish artists rarely come up for sale. More commonly, basic works with modest prices are sold.

The table below shows examples of the prices of the works in the exhibition, as reported by Helsingin Sanomat and Nokkonen:

Works of art at the Valamo Monastery exhibition
Artist	Work	Auction price	Year of sale	Auction house	Valamo price	Factor
Juho Rissanen	Kalastajat ('Fishermen')	€2 900	2016	Hagelstam	€48 000	16,5 x
Juho Rissanen	Leipäpoika (Viljasiilo) ('Boy with Bread'/'Grain Silo')	€13 000	2006	Hagelstam	€72 000	5,5 x
Maria Wiik	Sairastava tyttö ('A Girl Who Is Ill')	€8 500	2002	Hagelstam	€96 000	11,29 x
Sigfrid August Keinänen	Kehrääjä ('Spinner')	€3 600	2006	Bukowskis	€48 000	13,3 x
Sigfrid August Keinänen	Ruokatauko ('Lunch Break')	€5 000	2011	Bukowskis	€60 000	12 x
Robert Wilhelm Ekman	Nuhteleva äiti ('A Scolding Mother')	€8 000	2003	Bukowskis	€84 000	10,5 x
Albert Edelfelt	Neiti Perrot ('Miss Perrot')	€5 000	2002	Bukowskis	€96 000	19,2 x
Albert Edelfelt	Odotus ('Waiting')	€11 000	2002	Bukowskis	€600 000	54,5 x

In addition, the exhibition featured works by Tyko Sallinen and Robert Wilhelm Ekman for sale. According to Nokkonen, "the monastery expected to receive income of up to hundreds of thousands of euros from the sale of art and from exhibition visitors," based on the fact that the previous "Master's Imprint II" exhibition had attracted over 13,000 visitors to the monastery, "many of whom had purchased a package built around the exhibition, including guided tours, meals and wine tours." Nokkonen, who has long investigated art crimes, writes that he "is not... aware of any case where such blatant overpricing has been asked for art as in 'Via Finland'." Nokkonen states the following about the most expensive work in the exhibition:

The unsigned painting depicts Elli Jäppinen, known as Edelfelt's model, in the national costume of Ruokolahti, by a flowing rapid. Marina Catani, the leading expert on Edelfelt's catalogue, has stated that the work is an impressionistically painted colour sketch. No Edelfelt work had ever fetched more than 600,000 euros at auction when Via Finlandia opened. Larin Paraske singing lamets had fetched as much as 850,000 euros in a private sale... However, the sale in question was based on gross fraud.

According to Nokkonen, Odotus is not "a gem in Edelfelt's catalogue that would fit in any museum," as Bishop Arseni had said in an interview with Savon Sanomat. Nor had it been in the possession of a mysterious family from Savo for 30 years, as Arseni claimed in the newspaper. Later, in 2021, the work was sold at Hagelstam's auction for 12,000 euros.

According to Nokkonen, the most expensive work sold at the exhibition was Juho Rissanen's Leipäpoika for 72,000 euros. It had been sold in 2006 for 13,000 euros. In total, Rissanen's works have only fetched more than 10,000 euros four times, so the price in Valamo was more than 50,000 euros higher than it should have been.

The sales exhibition apparently yielded good results. Archimandrite Sergei told Helsingin Sanomat about the results of the sale that "I have not studied the exact amounts, but I know that the economy is now in the black. [...] Thank God for that."

== Role of the press ==
Nokkonen and Matti Pulliainen, Detective Superintendent from the National Bureau of Investigation in Kuopio, submitted to the Finnish National Bureau of Investigation the idea that cases of overpricing should be investigated. But "in Savo, it was considered that one can ask for and pay whatever one wants for art." The police therefore refused to investigate the pricing of the art sale in Valamo. Savolainen and Tikkanen continued to sell art at, among others, the Nastola Art Center Taarasti in 2018. It was only after an extensive article by journalist Anu Nousiainen in May 2018 that this sale was stopped. In Nokkonen's opinion, "the police should have stopped that activity, not the press."

An unsigned painting by Tyko Sallinen was on sale in Taarasti, which, according to Savolainen, had been in the possession of the mysterious family for 30 years. It sold for 36,000 euros. Later, in January 2023, the same work was sold at Ekman's auction in Tampere for 140 euros. At that time, the artist's name was not mentioned.

After Nousiainen's article, Savon Sanomat also began to write about the Valamo exhibitions in a different style. At the end of August 2019, the headline on the newspaper's main news page was "The story of the family art collection was invented." According to the article, "the family's immeasurably valuable art collection does not exist." The artworks in the sales exhibitions that toured Finland were owned by an art store in Kuopio, and some of them were later found to be fakes, some were just printed posters. The Savon Sanomat article was related to a trial that began in Kuopio in the fall of 2019, in which the people behind the art exhibitions were accused of fraud and forgery, and the female party of aggravated embezzlement.

Savon Sanomat continued writing about the matter on September 7, 2019. Regarding the Valamo art exhibitions, the headline now stated that "Tens of thousands of visitors were misinformed" and that "Art historians who visited the exhibitions had warned the dealers about this earlier", referring to the fact that in addition to prints, the exhibitions had also featured "suspicious paintings". An attempt had been made to age one of the works afterwards, according to a statement written for the police investigation. The price for that painting at the Valamo exhibition was 84,000 euros. Another work had been scratched in an attempt to make it look older. Works by different artists from different periods had been signed in the same reddish-brown colour. The age of some of the works did not correspond to the period.

There were also irregularities in the exhibition catalogue:

You were not allowed to take a catalogue of works with you from the exhibition. You could only use it for the time you were at the exhibition. The list was vague and incomplete compared to many other exhibitions.

In the case of Picasso, a technique was mentioned that no art historian had ever heard of. One art historian came to the conclusion on site that the prints advertised as graphics were printed in a printing press. The prints were placed under two glasses so that visitors would not notice that they were pixelated even to the naked eye. Some of the images even had page numbers; they had been scanned from books.

Two of the paintings in the exhibition turned out to be forgeries.

== Reactions from the church ==
=== Archbishop Leo ===
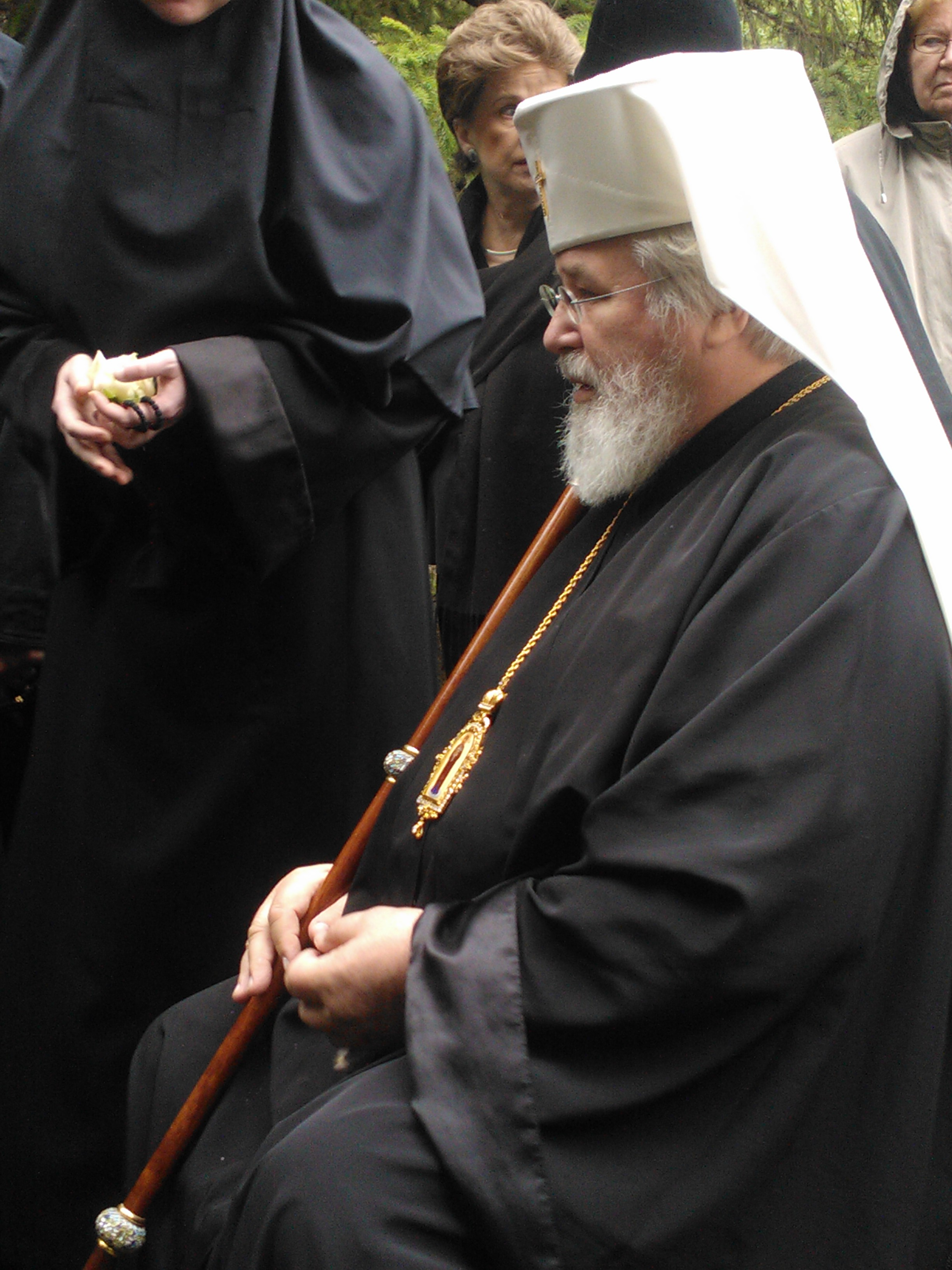
Archbishop Leo.

According to Savon Sanomat, the Valamo case was notable because busloads of groups were brought to the monastery, as well as random tourists and regular summer visitors came to the monastery, who paid to see a "museum quality exhibition". The police's preliminary investigation also revealed that forgeries had been sold in the parish premises of the Orthodox Church. The newspaper asked Archbishop Leo about the matter, but he initially stated that he would not comment on the matter to the media. Although the monastery was not suspected of any crimes, according to the newspaper, there is a big ethical question about the responsibility of a religious community in such art trafficking:

The monastery and the church also gave their names to a sales exhibition, which also sold scratched, torn, folded paintings and prints with visible printer marks.

The works on sale were works that had been bought for a few thousand euros at an auction in Helsinki and whose price was increased by the 'Valamo factor' to 50,000–90,000 euros.

Many buyers thought they were buying a work worth its price, because it is believed that religious men will not ask for an exorbitant prices these days. The buyers did not know that the works had not been evaluated by any art expert, and that the information had been entered in the brochures from internet searches.

The buyers did not know that the names of the works had been changed from the originals so that buyers would not wonder why the price had increased a hundredfold since the work had previously been sold at an auction house.

A week and a half later, Leo agreed to speak to Savon Sanomat. In his opinion, both he and the monastery had been "misled". "I am extremely angry about the matter. Many have been misled in this matter. Not everyone would even want come forth with their names in this matter," he said. He hoped that the police would investigate the matter to the end, in order to find out "how the reputation of the Orthodox Church was used in the sales activities of a single art dealer. ... I myself was misled when I was at the Valaam Monastery opening the exhibitions." He says that he is very sorry for those who bought the works or trusted the exhibitions. He emphasized that he and Archimandrite Sergei had trusted that the curation was appropriate, the backgrounds of the works were in order, and the prices were reasonable. The matter has caused damage to the church and to the monastery, Leo stated.

=== Metropolitan Arseni ===
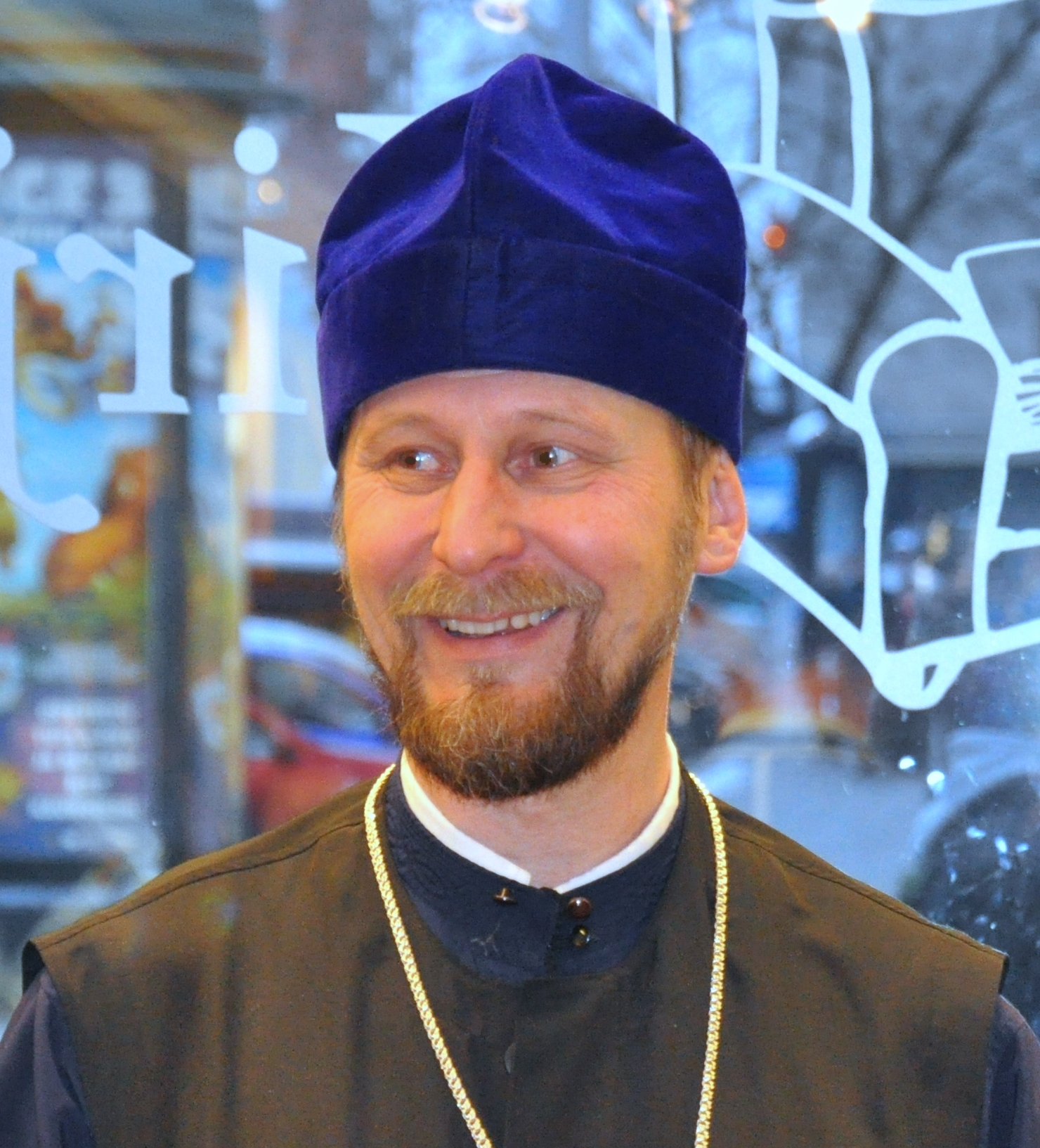
Metropolitan Arseni.

Metropolitan Arseni claimed that he had only noticed the prints that turned out to be inkjet prints during the exhibition. He reportedly had no part in them and had asked them to be removed as soon as he noticed them.

A completely different picture emerges from Asta Tenhunen's Comment article. When she asked him "about his responsibility for the exhibition," Arseni replied:

I have not collaborated with them [the art dealer couple] except in Valamo, and not even with them there, but only with the Valamo monastery.

The journalist said that she would write that Arseni had collaborated with the Kuopio couple for at least ten years, at which time he "threatened her with the Council for Mass Media in Finland, forbade the use of his entire interview and accused the journalist of spreading false information." He later admitted in an email that he "had known the other person... for a long time." He denied knowing anything about the forged Picasso works. However, he had appeared in the church newspaper Aamun Koitto in an article promoting the exhibition, along with "a fake Picasso work and other paintings of exceptionally poor quality".

On another occasion, although in a different article published on the same day, Arseni admitted that he knew that there was no family of owners, but that it was a couple:

Yes, I knew about it. But how it [the exhibition] was marketed is a different matter. I was not responsible for that, the Valamo Monastery knows how they ended up with such marketing.

Arseni also defended the pricing of the works:

You only have to go to any art store, they will sell the works at exactly the same kinds of prices... I trusted that the works were authentic and acquired from auction houses. That's what you think, Bukowski and Hagelstam don't sell fakes.

=== Archimandrite Sergei ===
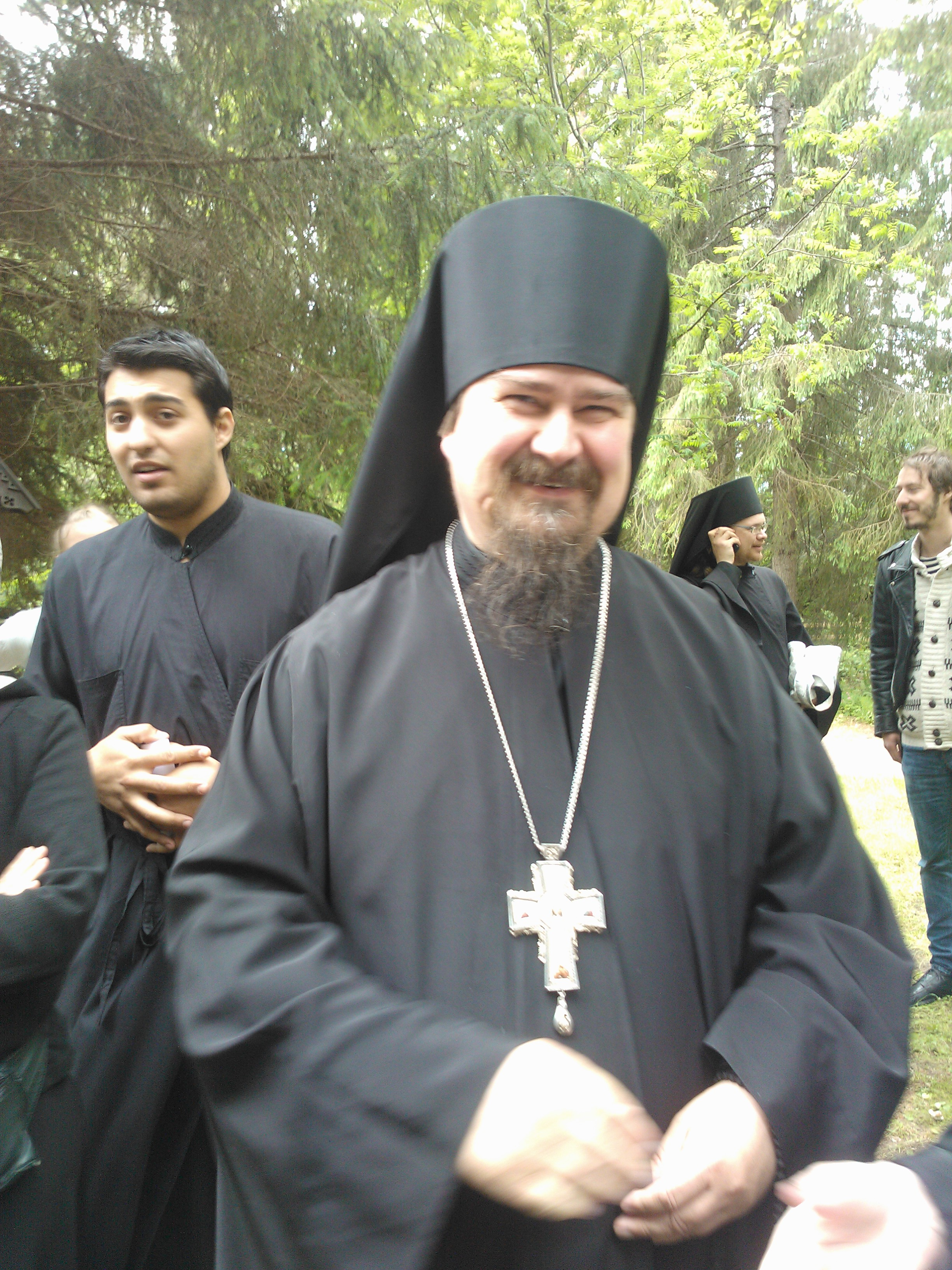
Bishop Sergei.

Archimandrite Sergei informed Savon Sanomat that in the future the Valamo Monastery will investigate the backgrounds of its partners more closely and will carefully ensure that its name is not associated with dishonest projects. He said that

Both the monastery and those who visited the exhibition and purchased works from it have been deceived in connection with the exhibition.
