= Magic Recoveries =

Studio album by Disco Ensemble
- Released: May 7, 2008
- Recorded: 2007–2008
- Genre: Punk rock Post-hardcore
- Label: Fullsteam Records; Universal Music Group
- Producer: Pelle Gunnerfeldt

Disco Ensemble chronology
First Aid Kit (2005)	Magic Recoveries (2008)	The Island of Disco Ensemble (2010)

Magic Recoveries is the third album from Finnish post-hardcore band Disco Ensemble. The album was released on 7 May 2008 in Finland and went straight to the first place of the album chart.

The recording began in late November 2007 and was finished by the middle of January 2008. While recording the album, the band posted up seven video diaries, to keep the fans informed about the upcoming album and its recording.

"Bad Luck Charm" and "Headphones" were both released as singles.

== Track listing ==
No.	Title	Length
1.	"Magic Recoveries"	3:16
2.	"We Can Stop Whenever We Want"	3:06
3.	"Bad Luck Charm"	4:26
4.	"Worst Night Out"	4:52
5.	"Arsonists vs. Firemen"	4:12
6.	"Threat Letter Typewriter"	3:48
7.	"Headphones"	4:25
8.	"Beacon"	5:16
9.	"24/365"	4:06
10.	"Poltergeist"	3:01
11.	"Lightweight Giants"	4:54
12.	"Stun Gun"	3:15
13.	"Boxer" (Hidden Track)	4:48

== Trivia ==
- The album version of "Stun Gun" is four minutes and twenty nine seconds long, due to an added, large pause separating it from the hidden, bonus song "Boxer".
- The 13th song on the album, "Boxer", isn't mentioned in the CD box.
