= Viper Ethics =

Studio album by Disco Ensemble
- Released: 2003
- Recorded: 2003
- Genre: Punk rock Post-hardcore
- Length: 39:58
- Label: Fullsteam Records

Disco Ensemble chronology
Ghosttown Effect (2001)	Viper Ethics (2003)	First Aid Kit (2005)

Viper Ethics is the first full-length studio album that Disco Ensemble made, released in 2003 in Finland by Fullsteam Records. The songs "Zombies" and "Videotapes" were released off it.

== Track listing ==
No.	Title	Length
1.	"Dynamite Days"	3:54
2.	"Zombies"	3:02
3.	"In Neon"	2:40
4.	"Videotapes"	4:02
5.	"Masquerade"	3:33
6.	"Mantra"	3:58
7.	"Secret Society"	4:01
8.	"Cynic"	3:52
9.	"Invisible Ink"	3:39
10.	"Skeleton Key"	4:00
11.	"Sink Your Teeth In"	3:19

== Personnel ==
- Mikko Hakila – drums
- Miikka Koivisto – vocals, keyboards
- Lasse Lindfors - Bass
- Jussi Ylikoski - Guitar
