= Bad Luck Charm =

Single by Disco Ensemble

from the album Magic Recoveries
- Released: May 20, 2008
- Genre: Post-Hardcore-Indie.
- Length: 3:57
- Label: Fullsteam Records; Universal Music Group
- Songwriter(s): Mikko Hakila, Miikka Koivisto, Lasse Lindfors, Lill Lindfors

Disco Ensemble singles chronology
"Drop Dead, Casanova" (2007)	"Bad Luck Charm" (2008)	"Headphones" (2008)

"Bad Luck Charm" is the first single released from the album, Magic Recoveries, by post-hardcore Finnish band, Disco Ensemble. It was released in Finland on 20 May 2008, reaching number seven in the Finnish singles chart.

== Track listing ==
1. "Bad Luck Charm (Radio Edit)" - 3:57
