= The Big Defreeze =

Professional ratings
Review scores
Source	Rating
Drowned in Sound	7/10
Exclaim!	6/10
Nothing But Hope And Passion	1.5/5
The Skinny	3/5 stars

The Big Defreeze is an album by The Traveling Band.
