= Ganglion (disambiguation) =

Ganglion is a biological tissue mass, most commonly a mass of nerve cell bodies.

Ganglion may also refer to:

- Ganglion cyst
- Ganglion (band), a musical act from Calgary, Alberta, Canada
- Ganglion (manga), a Japanese manga written by Hisaya Shiraiwa and illustrated by Takashi Itsuki

== See also ==
- Ganglia (disambiguation)
