= Young Desire =

Young Desire may refer to:

- Young Desire (film), a 1930 American drama
- Young Desire (album), a 2007 studio album by the Finnish band Lapko
