= Young Desire (album) =

Studio album by Lapko
- Released: 2007
- Genre: Rock
- Label: Fullsteam Records
- Producer: Karo Broman

Lapko chronology
Scandal	Young Desire	A New Bohemia

Professional ratings
Review scores
Source	Rating
Imperiumi	9/10 stars

Young Desire is the third studio album by the Finnish band Lapko. It was released in 2007 and is a theme album which, as the title suggests, deals with the passion of youth.

== Track listing ==
1. "This Is Aggressive Melancholy"
2. "Young Desire"
3. "Miami Vicer "
4. "Sawyer the Brother"
5. "Hugging the Phone"
6. "Dead Disco"
7. "Killer Whales "
8. "Bad Boy"
9. "Not Your Son"
10. "Paranoid"
11. "Funerals and Parties"

== Personnel ==
=== Band ===
- Ville Malja – vocals, electric guitar
- Anssi Nordberg – bass guitar
- Janne Heikkonen – drum kit

=== Other ===
- Karo Broman – producer
