= Ganglia (disambiguation) =

The term ganglia may refer to:

- Plural form of ganglion, a cluster of neurons
- Lymph node
- Ganglion cyst
- Ganglia (software), a scalable distributed monitoring system for high-performance computing systems

== See also ==
- Ganglion (disambiguation)
