= First Aid Kit (album) =

Studio album by Disco Ensemble
- Released: January 11, 2005
- Recorded: 2005
- Genre: Alternative rock Post-hardcore; Electronic rock Punk rock Emo
- Label: Fullsteam Records; Universal Music Group

Disco Ensemble chronology
Viper Ethics (2003)	First Aid Kit (2005)	Magic Recoveries (2008)

First Aid Kit
- Reissue album cover

First Aid Kit
Review scores
Source	Rating
AllMusic	3.5/5 stars
Drowned in Sound	8/10

First Aid Kit is the second full-length studio album by Disco Ensemble, originally released in 2005 in Finland by Fullsteam Records. In 2006 it was reissued as a worldwide release by Universal Music Group. Four songs were rerecorded for this reissue and it also included one additional track, "Eyes of a Ghost" from the Black Euro CD single. A Japanese version was also released which included five bonus tracks. A further version was released with a fold out cardboard case and a bonus DVD including the music videos 'Black Euro' 1 & 2, 'We Might Fall Apart' and the original video for 'Drop Dead, Casanova'. Also, it had 4 live videos from their Tavastia gig on 24 March 2006.

First Aid Kit features a more refined sound than its predecessor, Viper Ethics, more care having been taken during the recording phase of the album's development. The album's sound contains less grunge, but remains edgy, setting the band's signature sound that has stayed with them in later albums such as their 2008 effort Magic Recoveries.

== Track listing ==
No.	Title	Length
1.	"This Is My Head Exploding"
2.	"We Might Fall Apart"
3.	"Drop Dead, Casanova"
4.	"Human Cannonball"
5.	"Eyes of a Ghost"
6.	"Black Euro"
7.	"First Aid Kit"
8.	"Fresh New Blood"
9.	"See If I Care"
10.	"So Long, Sisters"
11.	"You Are the Dawn"
12.	"Sleep on the Wheel"

== Personnel ==
- Mikko Hakila – drums
- Miikka Koivisto – vocals, keyboards
- Lasse Lindfors - Bass
- Jussi Ylikoski - Guitar
