= Big Oil =

Largest publicly traded companies

Globally, net income of the oil and gas industry reached a record US$4 trillion in 2022.

After the COVID-19 pandemic, energy company profits increased with higher fuel prices resulting from the Russian invasion of Ukraine, falling debt levels, tax write-downs of projects shut down in Russia, and backing off from earlier plans to reduce greenhouse gas emissions.

Big Oil is a colloquial grouping of the world's six largest publicly traded and investor-owned oil and gas companies, also known as supermajors.

2024 USD (billions)
Oil major	Revenue	Profits
Exxon Mobil	339.25	48.87
Shell	284.31	16.50
TotalEnergies	195.61	29.82
Chevron	193.41	28.10
BP	189.19	11.47
Eni	140.00	21.00

The term, particularly in the United States, emphasizes their economic power and influence on politics. Big Oil is often associated with the fossil fuels lobby and also used to refer to the industry as a whole in a pejorative or derogatory manner.

Sources conflict on the exact makeup of Big Oil today, though the companies which are most frequently mentioned as supermajors are ExxonMobil, Shell, TotalEnergies, BP, and Chevron with Eni and ConocoPhillips, prior to ConocoPhillips spinning off its downstream operations into Phillips 66, frequently being included as well. The phrase "Super-Major" emanated from a report published by Douglas Terreson of investment bank Morgan Stanley in February 1998. The report predicted a substantial consolidation phase of "Major" Oil companies which would result in a group of dominant "Super-Major" entities. Big Oil previously referred to seven oil companies which formed the Consortium for Iran; such "Seven Sisters" were the Anglo-Persian Oil Company (a predecessor of BP), Shell plc, three of Chevron's predecessors (Standard Oil of California, Gulf Oil and Texaco), and two of ExxonMobil's predecessors (Jersey Standard and Standard Oil of New York).

The term, analogous to others such as Big Tech, Big Steel, Big Tobacco, Big Soda, and Big Pharma which describe industries dominated by a few giant corporations, was popularized in print from the late 1960s. Today it is often used to refer specifically to the seven supermajors. The use of the term in the popular media often excludes the national producers and OPEC oil companies who have a much greater global role in setting prices than the supermajors. China's two state-owned oil companies, Sinopec and the China National Petroleum Corporation, as well as Saudi Aramco, had greater revenues in 2022 than any investor-owned oil company.

In the maritime industry, six to seven large oil companies that decide a majority of the crude oil tanker chartering business are called "Oil Majors".

== History ==
=== As the Seven Sisters ===
The expression "Seven Sisters" was coined by the head of the Italian state oil company (Eni), Enrico Mattei,. The history of the supermajors traces back to the seven oil companies which formed the "Consortium for Iran" cartel and dominated the global petroleum industry from the mid-1940s to the 1970s. The Seven Sisters were:

- Anglo-Persian Oil Company (BP)
- Gulf Oil (Chevron)
- Shell (Royal Dutch Shell)
- Standard Oil of California (Chevron)
- Standard Oil of New Jersey (Exxon, later ExxonMobil)
- Standard Oil of New York (Mobil, later ExxonMobil)
- Texaco (Chevron)

By the 1930s, the Seven Sisters dominated oil production in the world. The companies owned nearly all rights to the oil in Iran, Iraq, Saudi Arabia, and the Persian Gulf. The companies established jointly owned companies (such as the Iraq Petroleum Company) to legally tie their hands together, facilitate cooperation, and prevent cheating on one another. The companies sought to limit the supply of oil by controlling the speed at which oil fields were developed. From the 1920s to 1940s, they had agreements not to produce oil in the Middle East unless it was in coordination with one another. After the 1940s, the companies continued to collude. The discovery of massive oil fields in Saudi Arabia threatened to scuttle the cartel, as control of the oil fields by two companies could undermine existing supply management schemes. However, the Saudi oil production ultimately became jointly controlled by four of the seven sisters, thus making it easier to maintain coordination between the Seven Sisters.

According to Jeff Colgan, the Seven Sisters faced two major problems. The first revolved around coordinating the activities of the companies so that oil prices would be kept high. The second revolved around cooperation with the governments of the territories containing the oil reserves: the companies sought to minimize the taxes and royalties paid to the governments. In terms of dealing with host governments, the Seven Sisters benefitted from the willingness of British and American governments to pressure and coerce the host governments. The oil companies also slowed down production when taxes and royalties were increased by one host government while ramping up production in other territories with lower taxes and royalties, thus pressuring host governments to keep taxes and royalties low.

Host governments faced a number of hurdles in terms of nationalizing the oil production. First, a number of oil-producing countries did not have independence and were controlled by empires. Second, great powers had installed compliant heads of state in several oil-producing countries, making those leaders reliant on the support of the great powers and unwilling to upset them. Third, a number of oil-producing countries lacked the capital and technical expertise to run the oil production, as well as needed access to North American and European markets. Fourth, oil-producing countries feared that they would be punished by Western governments and firms if they nationalized oil production (as Mohammad Mossadegh was when he nationalized the Iranian oil industry).

In 1951, Iran nationalized its oil industry, previously controlled by the Anglo-Iranian Oil Company (now BP), and Iranian oil was subjected to an international embargo. In an effort to bring Iranian oil production back to international markets, the U.S. State Department suggested the creation of a consortium of major oil companies, several of which were daughter corporations of John D. Rockefeller's original Standard Oil monopoly.

In 1959, the Seven Sisters reduced the price of oil for Venezuela and Middle Eastern producers, which provoked anger among oil-producing governments. This prompted the oil-producing governments to take the initial steps to establish OPEC. The Seven Sisters threatened the OPEC founders that they would lose market access if they went ahead with their plans.

The head of the Italian state oil company (Eni), Enrico Mattei, sought membership for his company, but was rejected and since then spread the expression "Seven Sisters". British writer Anthony Sampson took over the term when he wrote the book The Seven Sisters in 1975, to describe the oil cartel that tried its best to eliminate competitors and keep control of the world's oil resource. The term for the oil cartel was further popularized, along with a fictional logo, in Mad Max 2: The Road Warrior, a 1981 post-apocalyptic dystopian action film about apocalyptic fuel shortages.

Being politically influential, vertically integrated, well organized, and able to negotiate cohesively as a cartel, the Seven Sisters were initially able to exert considerable power over Third World oil producers. Despite their market power, the Seven Sisters kept prices stable at moderate levels. This was done to disincentivize governments in both the consumer and producer countries from imposing regulations on the oil industry.

=== 1973 oil crisis ===
Preceding the 1973 oil crisis, the Seven Sisters controlled around 85 percent of the world's petroleum reserves. In the 1970s, many countries with large reserves nationalized holdings of all major oil companies. Since then, industry dominance has shifted to the OPEC cartel and state-owned oil and gas companies in emerging-market economies, such as Saudi Aramco, Gazprom (Russia), China National Petroleum Corporation, National Iranian Oil Company, PDVSA (Venezuela), Petrobras (Brazil), and Petronas (Malaysia). In 2007, the Financial Times called these "the new Seven Sisters". According to consulting firm PFC Energy, by 2012 only 7% of the world's known oil reserves were in countries that allowed private international companies free rein. Fully 65% were in the hands of state-owned companies.

==== "The Era of the Super-Major" ====
"The Era of the Super Major" was an industry report published by Douglas Terreson of Morgan Stanley on 13 February 1998. Terreson was the top-rated Integrated Oil analyst according to Institutional Investor magazine at the time and had a broad following within the global investment community. After many years of poor industry performance by the Energy sector, Terreson suggested that business models had become obsolete, and that major strategic change was needed across the global Energy sector for value propositions to become competitive with the other parts of the market.

The premise of the report was that "a confluence of industry dynamics would conspire to produce a strategic and financial environment that was conducive to major consolidation activity in the Integrated Oil sector. Significant modifications to the strategic landscape would result, dictating competitive placement and equity market performance for years to come". The report indicated that the phase would be driven by the competitive implications of: (1) the globalization of privatized national oil companies and (2) the rising stature of specialized multinationals. Combinations were expected primarily between Major Oils which would then become "Super-Majors" which was a phrase created at Morgan Stanley in the late 1990s to denote the prototype model for success in the Integrated Oil industry as gains in globalization and scale unfolded.

Within 6 months of publication of "The Era of the Super-Major", BP and Amoco merged, representing the largest industrial combination on Wall Street at that time. The combined value of the stocks of those 2 companies rose significantly and that merger was followed by ExxonMobil, BP-Amoco-Arco, ConocoPhillips, Chevron-Texaco-Unocal, Total-Petrofina-Elf and others. The phase represented one of the largest consolidation phases in the history of the Energy sector. Corporate performance was very positive in Energy through 2007, underscoring the premise that the "Super-Major" thesis would create significant economic value for shareholders:

- Exxon and Mobil merging to form ExxonMobil in 1999
- Total's merger with Petrofina in 1999 and with Elf Aquitaine in 2000, with the resulting company subsequently renamed Total (now TotalEnergies)
- British Petroleum's merger with Amoco, becoming BP Amoco, later BP, in 1998 and acquisition of ARCO in 2000
- Chevron's merger with Texaco in 2001
- Conoco and Phillips Petroleum Company merging in 2002 to form ConocoPhillips

This process of consolidation created some of the largest global corporations as defined by the Forbes Global 2000 ranking, and as of 2007 all were within the top 25. Between 2004 and 2007 the profits of the six supermajors totaled US$494.8 billion. Many of these now-merged companies remain in the Fortune Global 500, with ExxonMobil ranking 12th, Total ranking 27th, BP ranking 35th, and Chevron ranking 37th in the 2022 edition of the list.

== Present composition ==
The composition of Big Oil is subject to wide debate. Nearly all accounts of Big Oil include ExxonMobil, Chevron, Shell, BP, Eni and TotalEnergies. All six of these companies are vertically integrated within the industry and operate upstream, midstream, and downstream.

=== Possible inclusions ===
==== ConocoPhillips ====
ConocoPhillips is less frequently counted as one of the Big Oil companies due to spinning off its downstream division into Phillips 66. Additionally, ConocoPhillips in 2022 ranked lower than any of the six major Big Oil companies on the Fortune Global 500, and its revenue was superseded by Phillips 66 in 2022.

==== Valero ====
Valero Energy ranked higher on the 2022 Fortune Global 500 than Eni, though the company frequently touts that it is an independent refiner focused on midstream and downstream operations which does not have significant upstream activities. In the media, however, Valero is sometimes called a "Big Oil" company and grouped with the other large companies.

== Influence ==
As a group, the supermajors control around 6% of global oil and gas reserves. Conversely, 88% of global oil and gas reserves are controlled by the OPEC cartel and state-owned oil companies, primarily located in the Middle East. A trend of increasing influence of the OPEC cartel, state-owned oil companies in emerging-market economies is shown and the Financial Times has used the label "The New Seven Sisters" to refer to a group of what it argues are the most influential national oil and gas companies based in countries outside of the OECD, namely CNPC (China), Gazprom (Russia), National Iranian Oil Company (Iran), Petrobras (Brazil), PDVSA (Venezuela), Petronas (Malaysia), and Saudi Aramco (Saudi Arabia).

Other companies not directly involved in trading oil and gas, but still supplying accessories such as drilling, fracking and refining equipment, have also been associated with Big Oil due to their political influence. In particular, Koch Industries and Wilks Masonry have actively funded lobby groups, think tanks and media outlets aligned with Big Oil.

== Maritime oil majors ==
In the maritime industry, a group of six companies that control the chartering of the majority of oil tankers worldwide are together referred to as "oil majors". These are: Shell, BP, ExxonMobil, Chevron, TotalEnergies and ConocoPhillips. Charter parties such as Shelltime 4 frequently mention the phrase "oil major".

== See also ==
- Other "Big" industries
  - Big Four accounting firms
  - Big Soda
  - Big Pharma
  - Big Tech
  - Big Three (automobile manufacturers)
  - Big Three (management consultancies)
  - Big Tobacco
- Robber baron, a Gilded Age term for wealthy and unethical 19th-century American businessmen, often applied to Rockefeller of Standard Oil
- Energy development
- Fossil fuel
- List of largest oil and gas companies by revenue
