= Rubik (band) =

Finnish indie pop/rock band

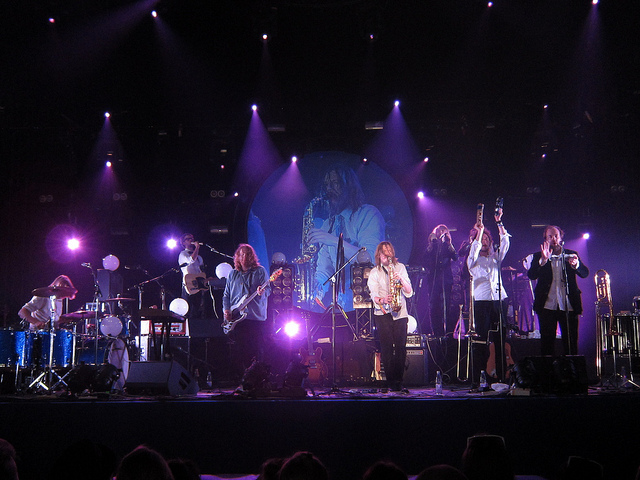
- Rubik at Flow Festival 2011 (left to right): S. Väätäinen, S. Pöyhönen, J. Hietala, A. Taira, A. Neuvonen, O. Töyli, J. Viljanen and T. Eriksson.

Background information
- Origin: Finland
- Genres: Indie Pop, Art Rock
- Years active: 2003 – December 2013
- Labels: New Music Community, Fullsteam
- Members: Artturi Taira (vocals, guitar, keys, saxophone); Samuli Pöyhönen (guitar, keys); Sampsa Väätäinen (drums, percussion); Jussi Hietala (bass) with Tuomas Eriksson (trombone, guitar, percussion); Olavi Töyli (clarinet, synths, percussion); Anssi Neuvonen (guitar, keys, trumpet); Juho Viljanen (trombone, percussion)
- Past members: Arvi Hasu; Lauri Hiekkala (deceased)
- Website: rubikband.net

Rubik was a Finnish indie pop/rock band known for its unique style of rich sound, complex but well-contained arrangements, changing rhythms and melodies ranging from playful and danceable to wistful and delicate.

The band started to emerge in the late 1990s in the eastern Finnish town of Kuopio where the drummer Sampa Väätäinen and the singer Artturi Taira began playing together joined later by the keyboardist/guitarist Samuli Pöyhönen. They became Rubik in 2003 when they played their first live show. The band released their debut EP People Go Missing in 2004 through New Music Community, causing a stir in the indie scene.

The band's first full-length album, titled Bad Conscience Patrol, was released in March 2007 through Fullsteam Records and met with excitement in Finland. Following the release, the band toured in Finland, the US and Canada and performed at European festivals.

Their second album entitled Dada Bandits was released on 1 April 2009. In the review of the album Spin Magazine wrote: "ADHD'd Finns explode piano balladry, spacey synths, drum blarts, mariachi brass, and a hypnotic chorus, then let the pieces fall into place". "Listening to Dada Bandits, it's hard not to feel that Rubik's done more-rather than following international trends, they're showing us all the way forward", wrote Nylon Magazine. Filter Magazine described "It's pure prog for now people… or perhaps No Wave for those with less access to cheap heroin. Freaky." The band toured in Finland and in Europe and twice in the US, first in autumn 2009 and again in summer 2010 playing with mewithoutYou. After the US tour the band played at Roskilde festival in Denmark and Øya festival in Norway in summer 2010.

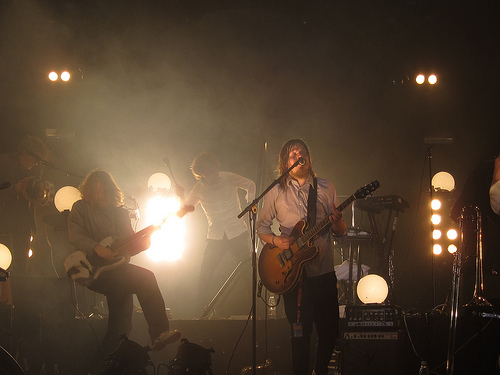
Rubik playing Storm in a Glass of Water at Flow Festival 2011

The third full-length album Solar was released 23 March 2011, receiving praising critiques both in the Finnish and international media. When reviewing the album, Die Zeit wrote: "Solar offers an array of songs with almost flawless pop structures." The blog Burning Ear described the album's songs as follows: "'World Around You' is a toy train on steroids as it careens its day-glo body around beautifully sloping railways on a summer afternoon. 'Storm In a Glass of Water' and 'Solar Death March (In Octaves)' showcase their knack for making beautiful music even when stripped down to its barest bones. And all that is less than half the album." The Finnish music monthly Sue named Solar "a modern Finnish national treasure, 9/10".

A juxtaposition of light and dark courses throughout the Solar. The album was written and recorded during the summer 2010 in a former movie theatre in Kulttuuritalo (Finnish for The House of Culture), designed by Alvar Aalto and built by leftist volunteers in the 1950s. "Every morning we put on our work clothes, had a morning meeting at 9 am in the Kulttuuritalo [House of Culture] café and then went to work on the songs underground until 3 am. It was 25 degrees outside and we were in darkness", Rubik has told of the writing and recording process. The album was mixed by Ben Allen who has also mixed albums for M.I.A, Cut Copy, Deerhunter and Animal Collective. The months following the release the band toured all over Finland. From May to June Rubik toured in Europe playing also at the Primavera festival in Barcelona being the first Finns ever to play at this top indie-rock festival. The same summer the band played at all the major festivals in Finland. In September 2011 Rubik began a two-month tour heading to Europe, Mexico's Cervantino festival and the US playing 38 concerts altogether.

The band has been acclaimed for its performance. In concerts there are up to ten musicians on stage playing instruments from the clockwork to the gong and exchanging them with each other. Also when writing and recording songs Rubik tries to abandon traditional roles in the band and aims for a more ego-free and collective process focused on ideas.

On 11 November 2013, bandleader Artturi Taira announced via the band's official Facebook page that the group had decided to disband with a farewell concert planned for 20 December. Rubik released their final music video for the song "We Are Like Fallen Leaves" (from the "Tehdas: Fake Music Mixtape" release) two days after this farewell concert on 22 December.

== Discography ==
- People Go Missing (EP) – New Music Community 2004
- "City & the Streets" (single) – Fullsteam 2007
- Bad Conscience Patrol – Fullsteam 2007
- Jesus vs. People (compilation) – Fullsteam 2007
- Dada Bandits – Fullsteam 2009
- Data Bandits EPEPEPEP (digi EP) – Fullsteam 2010
- "Laws of Gravity" (single) - Fullsteam 2011
- Solar – Fullsteam 2011
- "Diren GeziParkı" - Fullsteam 2013
- DirendiGeziParkı - Fullsteam 2016
