= Big Pharma =

Big Pharma may refer to:

- Big Pharma conspiracy theories
- Pharmaceutical industry
- Pharmaceutical lobby
- Pharmaceutical Research and Manufacturers of America (PhRMA), a trade group
- Big Pharma (artist), Finnish electronic musician
- Big Pharma (book), a 2006 book by Jacky Law
- Big Pharma (video game), a 2015 simulation video game

== See also ==
- List of conspiracy theories
- List of pharmaceutical companies
