= Big Media =

Big Media or corporate media may refer to:

- Concentration of media ownership, the decreasing amount of separate media organisations
- Mainstream media, conventional news outlets
- Mass media, the term for modern media that use mass communication
- Media conglomerate, a company owning many media outlets
