= Big Soda =

Collective entity of soft drink industry

Big Soda is a term used by the media and various activist groups to describe the soft drink industry as a collective entity. The term connotes the business and lobbying power of soft drink companies who—like Big Tech, Big Oil, Big Pharma and Big Tobacco—would use that power to influence politicians and voters. One example is their lobbying against a tax on sugary drinks in the United States. Big Soda forms a part of the broader sugar lobbying movement, Big Sugar.

Big Soda usually refers to the giants of the soft drink industry, such as The Coca-Cola Company, PepsiCo, and Keurig Dr Pepper.

== See also ==
- Big Four accounting firms
- Big Three (automobile manufacturers)
- Big Three (management consultancies)
