= Lapko =

Finnish alternative rock band

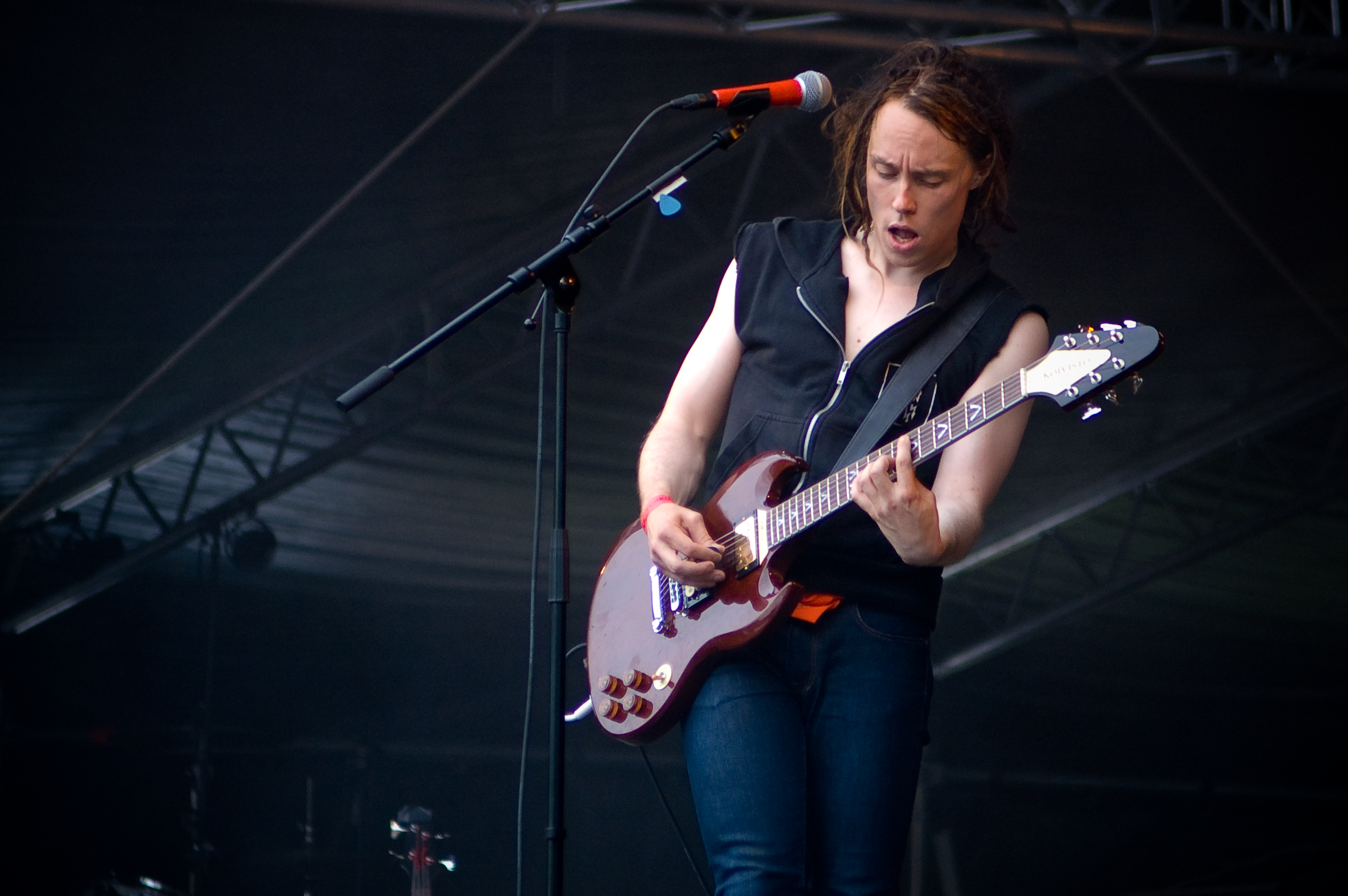
- Ville Malja at Ruisrock in 2007.

Background information
- Origin: Finland
- Genres: Alternative rock
- Years active: 1996–present
- Labels: Fullsteam Records
- Website: www.lapko.com

Lapko is a Finnish alternative rock band from Harjavalta, formed in 1996. Lapko is notable for its popularity in Finland, with "radio play, explosive concerts, and voluminous critical accolades" even before releasing its debut on a well-known label, according to Allmusic.

Their first EP, Your Special K.O. (2003) was self-released. Their debut album The Arms (2004) was released by Jukeboss, but then they were signed to Fullsteam Records and albums Scandal (2006) and Young Desire (2007) saw them gain fame in Finland, reaching the national albums chart.

== Members ==
- Ville Malja – vocals, guitar
- Anssi Nordberg – bass guitar
- Janne Heikkonen – guitar
- Jussi Matikainen - drums

== Discography ==
=== Albums ===
- The Arms (2004)
- Scandal (2006)
- Young Desire (2007)
- A New Bohemia (2010)
- ΓΟΛΕ (2012)
- Freedom (2015)

=== EPs ===
- Your Special K.O. (2003)
- Horse And Crow (2011)

=== Singles ===
- "Stacy" (2004)
- "All the Best Girls" (2006)
- "Barrel of the Past" (2006)
- "Killer Whales" (2007)
- "Hugging the Phone" (2007)
- "I Shot the Sheriff" (2009)
- "Summer Nights" (2010)
- "Love Is Sick And Wrong" (2012)
- "River Venom" (2012)
- "Money for Nothing" (2015)
