= Disco Ensemble =

Finnish band

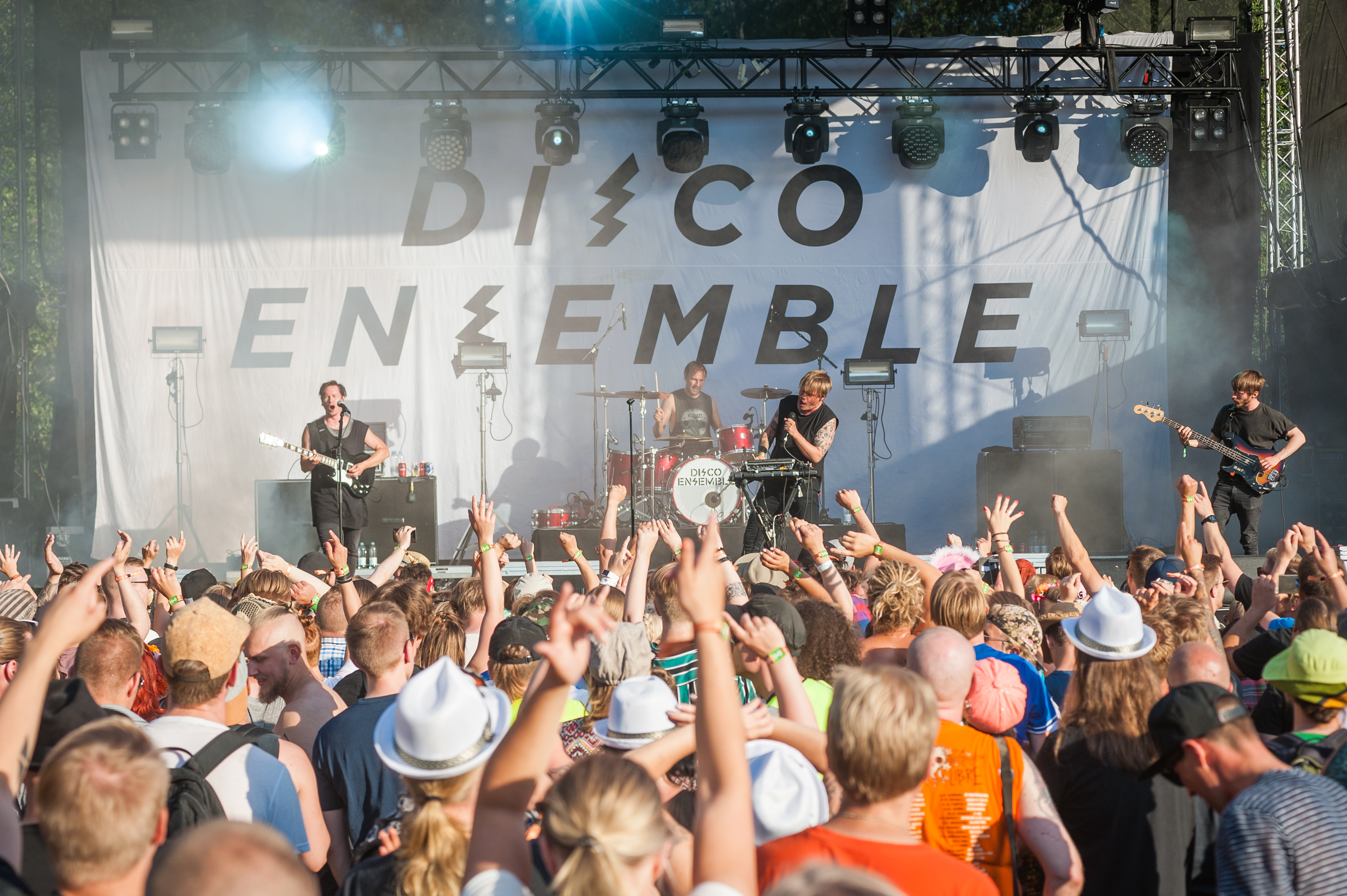
- Disco Ensemble at the 2018 Ilosaarirock festival in Joensuu, Finland.

Background information
- Origin: Ulvila, Finland
- Genres: Alternative rock, post-hardcore, dance-punk, electronic rock
- Years active: 1996–2018
- Labels: Fullsteam Records; Universal Music
- Members: Miikka Koivisto – Vocals, keys & DJ; Jussi Ylikoski – Guitar & Backing Vocals; Mikko Hakila – Drums; Lasse Lindfors – Bass
- Website: Official Website

Disco Ensemble was a Finnish post-hardcore/alternative rock band, originating from the small town of Ulvila. They have been noted for their energetic sound and rhythm, original guitar riffs and electronic synthesizer sounds.

== History ==
=== Early years (1996–2002) ===
The band was formed in 1996 by guitarist Jussi Ylikoski and drummer Mikko Hakila, who started by playing Metallica and AC/DC covers. Originally they were named simply DisCo. but they were forced to change their name to Disco Ensemble due to a Finnish electronic pop group having the same title.

The band played small venues and quickly gained notoriety in the local music scene. In 2000, future singer Miikka Koivisto attended one of their shows as a fan and later joined the band, first as a guitarist and later switching to vocals. After the three band members moved to study in Helsinki, they went through a number of bass players until Lasse Lindfors joined the group as a permanent member.

The band released their first EP Memory Three Sec in 2000. This was a lo-fi recording and it did not receive much attention. More notoriety came with their second effort Ghosttown Effect, released in 2001. The band's first single "Turpentine", was released off this EP.

=== Viper Ethics (2003–2005) ===
In 2003, Fullsteam Records signed Disco Ensemble and their first full-length album, Viper Ethics, was released the same year. The album received critical acclaim and the single "Videotapes" was moderately successful, peaking at No. 17 on Finnish charts. This allowed the band to tour in Finland and around Europe as well.

=== First Aid Kit (2005) ===
Disco Ensemble's second album, First Aid Kit, was released in 2005. It was unquestionably the band's most commercially successful release. The album peaked at No. 9 on the official Finnish chart. The singles "Black Euro" and "We Might Fall Apart" both peaked at No. 6 on the singles chart.

In the spring of 2006, following the national success of the second album, Disco Ensemble and Fullsteam Records signed a worldwide distribution deal with Universal Music. First Aid Kit was reissued and released first in Europe and later in North America, South America and Asia. The band toured heavily in promotion of the album. They embarked on the Antidote Tour with Danko Jones, Bedouin Soundclash and Gogol Bordello They also played on Kerrang!'s Most Wanted tour and in 2007 joined the Warped Tour.

Songs from this album appeared on the soundtracks of two Electronic Arts games—"We Might Fall Apart" was used on the game FIFA 08, while "This is my Head Exploding" was used on NHL 08.

The song "Black Euro" was used on the game MotoGP '08.

=== Magic Recoveries (2008) ===
Their third studio album Magic Recoveries was released on 5 May 2008. The band have since reached number 1 in the Finnish Album chart with their new album. EP Back On The MF Street was released in spring 2009. The song Golden Years from the EP was used in the video game NHL 10.

=== The Island of Disco Ensemble (2010) ===
Their fourth studio album The Island of Disco Ensemble was released on May, 26th 2010. First single from the album White Flag For Peace was released and aired in the Finnish radio channel YleX on 15 February 2010.

=== Warriors (2012) ===
Disco Ensemble announced the release of an album in 2012. The song "Your Shadow" was released ahead of the album in March. On August 20 the first single "Second Soul" premiered on YleX Radio. On August 21, the band revealed that the album was entitled Warriors, with the album being released on September 21. "Second Soul" was then officially released on August 22.

=== Afterlife (2017) and Farewell tour ===
Disco Ensemble released their sixth album "Afterlife" on January 27, 2017, again through Fullsteam records. Their final tour, named the Last Nights Out – The Farewell Tour, was from 25 October 2018 to 8 December 2018. The final 9 days of the tour were held at the Tavastia Klubi in Helsinki, Finland.

== Gallery ==
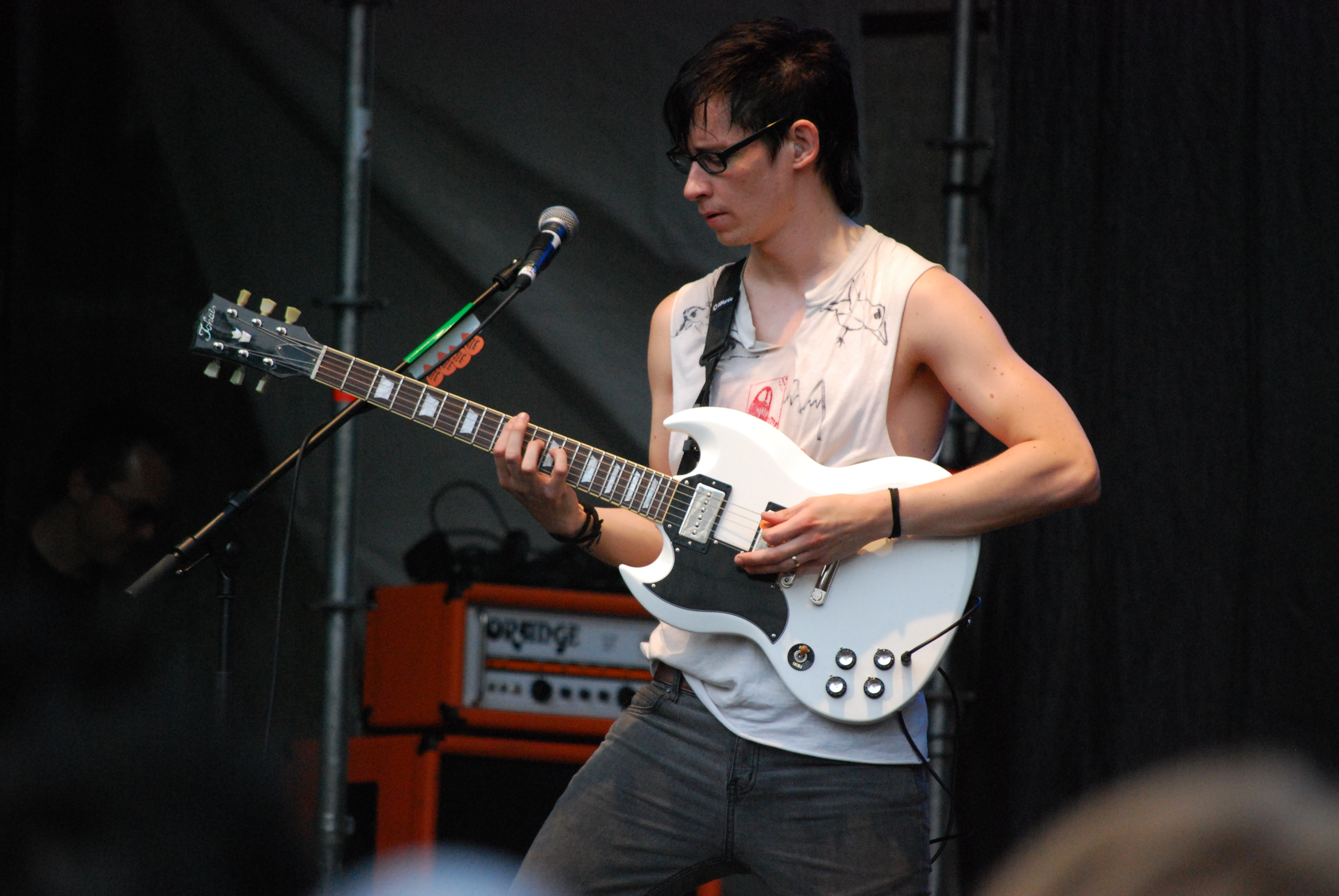
Jussi Ylikoski - guitar

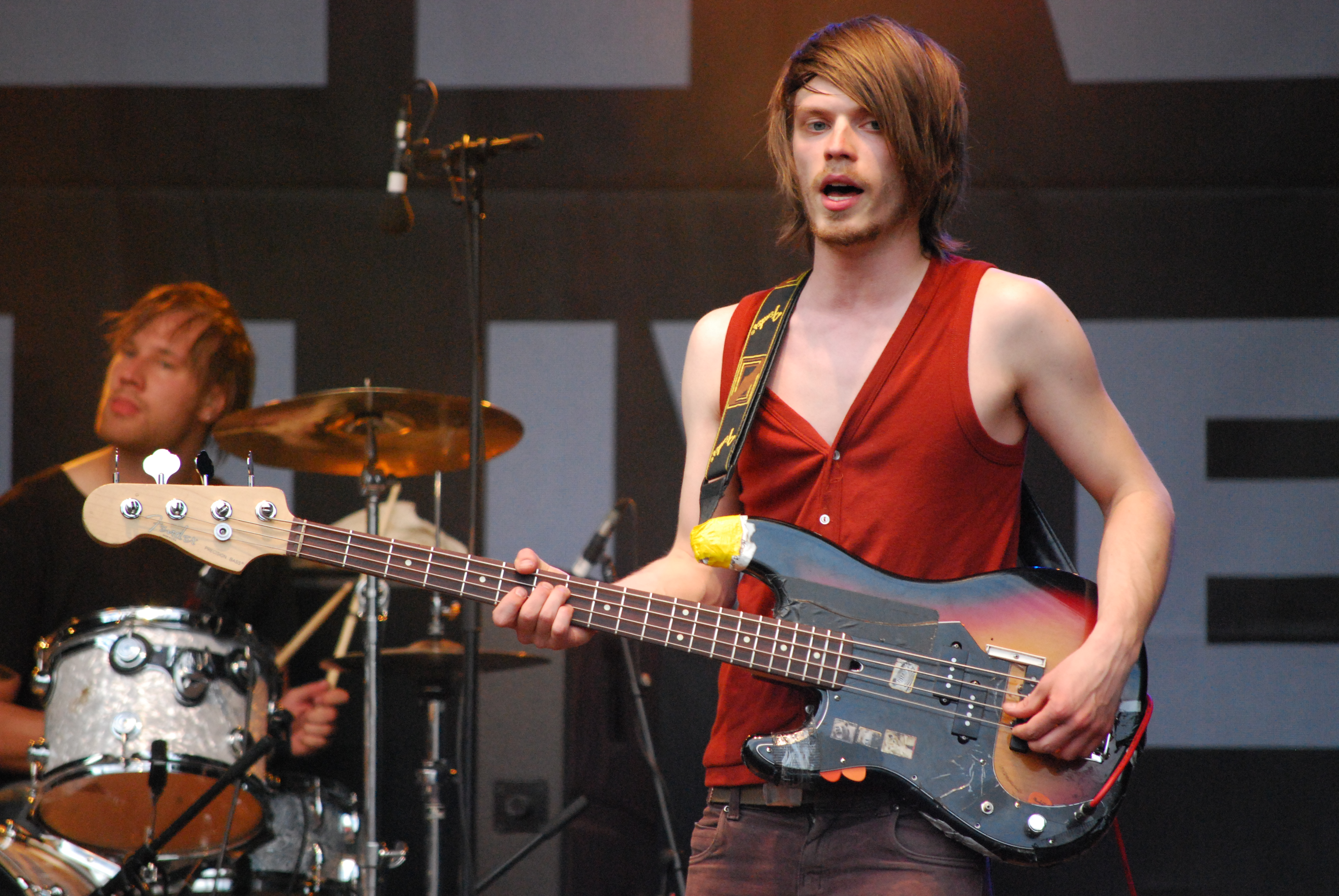
Lasse Lindfors - bass

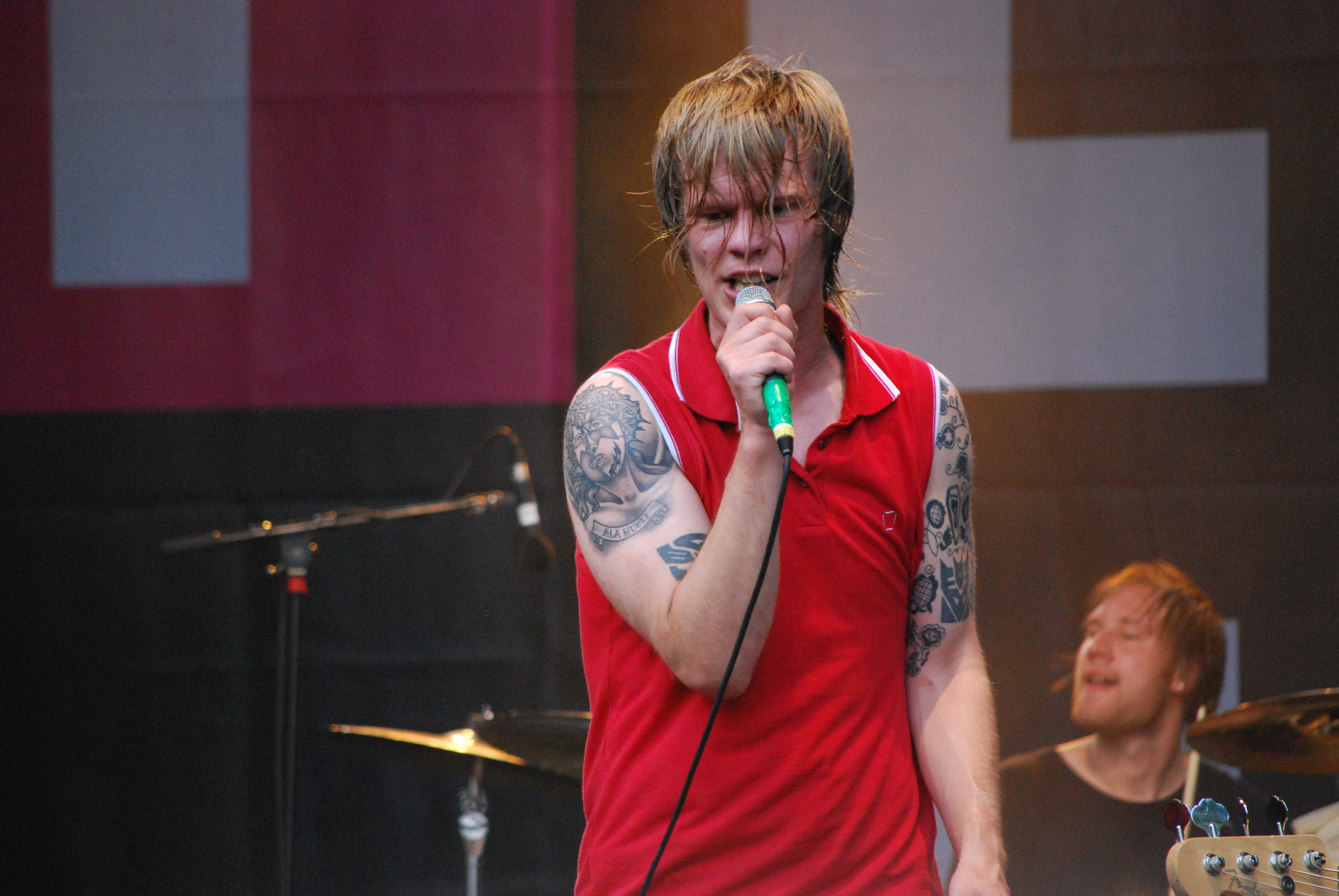
Miikka Koivisto- vocal, DJ Keyboard

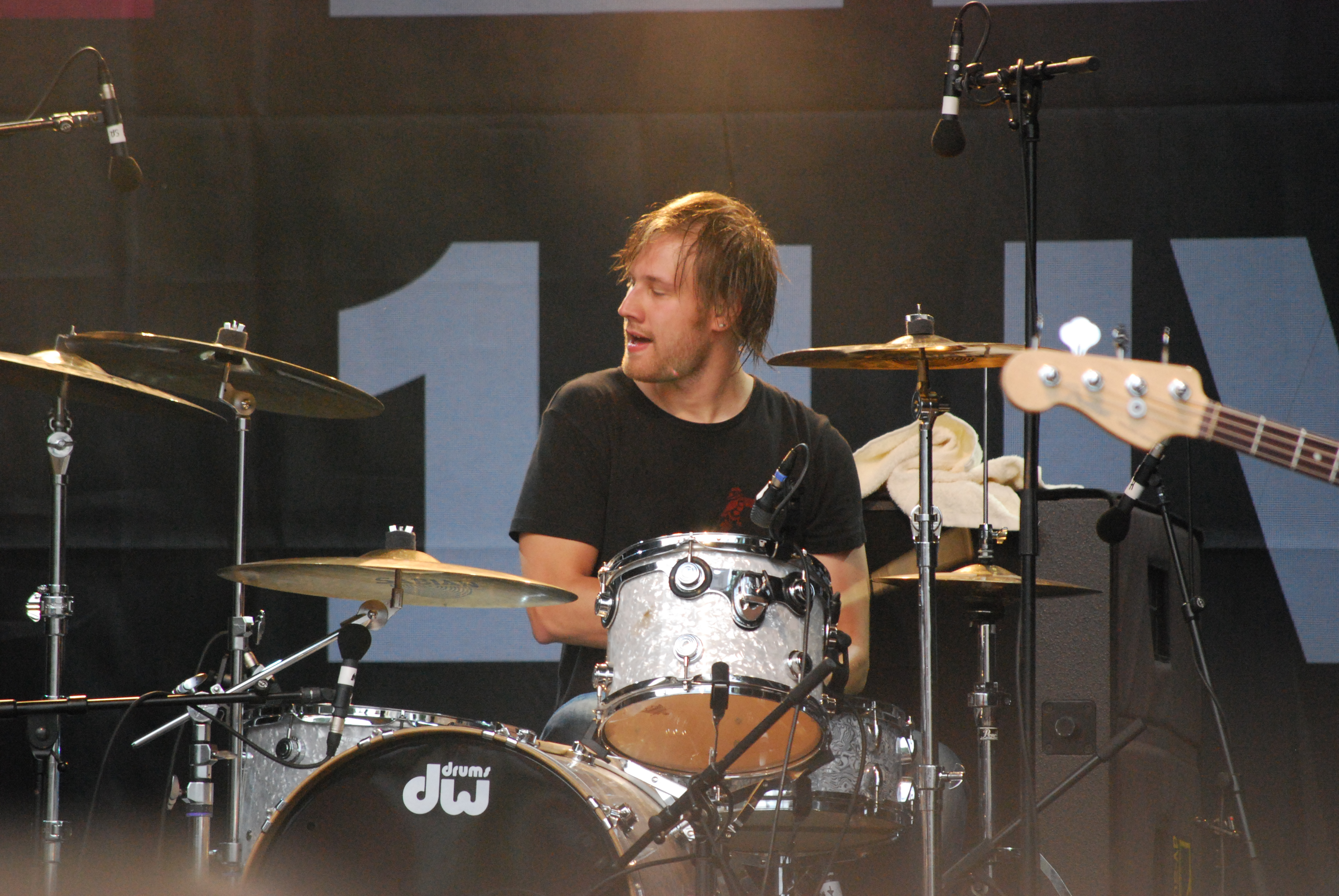
Mikko Hakila - drums

== Discography ==
=== Albums ===
- Viper Ethics (2003)
- First Aid Kit (2005)
- Magic Recoveries (2008)
- The Island of Disco Ensemble (2010)
- Warriors (2012)
- Afterlife (2017)

=== EPs ===
- Memory Three Sec. (2000)
- Ghosttown Effect (2001)
- Back On the MF Street (2009)

=== Singles ===
- Turpentine (2002)
- Transatlantic (2002)
- Mantra (2003)
- Videotapes (2004)
- We Might Fall Apart (2005)
- Black Euro (2005)
- Drop Dead, Casanova (2006)
- Bad Luck Charm (2008)
- Headphones (2008)
- Back On The MF Street (2009)
- Lefty (2010)
- White Flag For Peace (2010)
- Protector (2010)
- Second Soul (2012)
- Fight Forever (2017)

=== DVDs ===
- Video Vortex (2008)
