= Ganglion (band) =

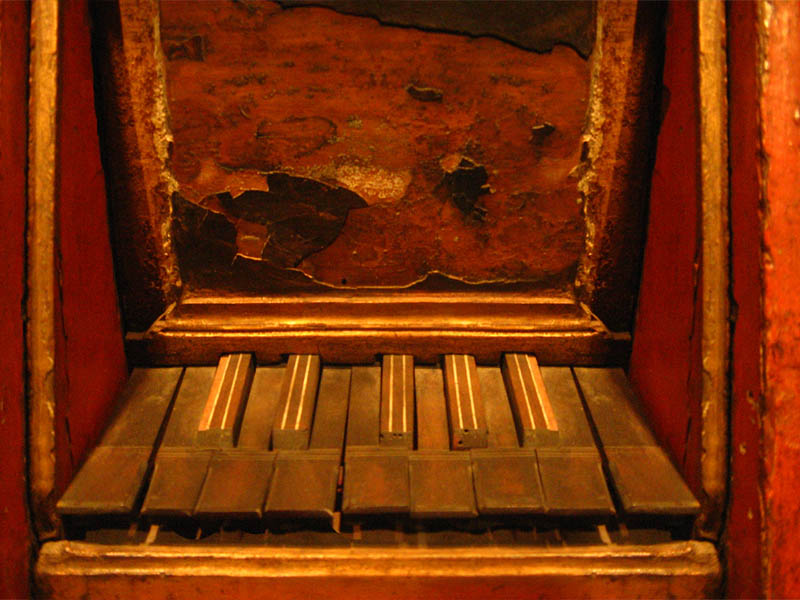

Background information
- Origin: Calgary, Alberta, Canada
- Genres: Experimental electroacoustic rock
- Years active: 2005–2011
- Labels: Societal Records
- Past members: Owen Thelwall; Megan Gerbrandt; Kyle Cheadle; Jessica Yeandle-Hignell; Mark Webber; Audrey Burch; Richard Spiegel; Kris Ellestad; Jess Prive; Schuyler Snowdon-Anderson; Tim Wood; Ivan Reese
- Website: ganglion.ca

Ganglion was a Canadian electroacoustic rock band formed in 2005 in Calgary. It was the musical alias for the solo recordings of bandleader Ivan Reese. Their music featured diverse instrumentation utilizing classical, modern and extended techniques. Since the beginning of the solo-recording project, Ganglion have recorded hundreds of hours of music and released dozens of albums.

== Sound ==
Ganglion's performances and recording sessions varied wildly, between a standard repertoire and free-form improvisation. In concert, their renditions of songs changed frequently and were always played differently from the recorded versions. There was no fixed lineup of musicians, with long-time regulars and one-time contributors filling different roles at every outing. Performances have featured as few as one and more than twenty players, with the band often pulling in members of the audience to drum along or sing freely.

== History ==
Ivan Reese began recording music on his home computer when he dropped out of the Alberta College of Art and Design in November 2004. After passing around a few experimental demo recordings, he was contracted to write and record a musical score for a newly written play, Alarum Within. The play was based on a book of poetry by the same name, about the time author Kimmy Beach spent as the stage manager of the theatre where the play had its debut. Principal recording of the score was completed in three days in the summer of 2005 with the assistance of future Ganglion member Owen Thelwall. Both musicians neither slept, ate, nor wore any clothing during most of the recording process, covering their faces and bodies with tribally inspired painted designs.

The following winter, Reese released the first solo work under the Ganglion name: a collection of demos and recording experiments titled with the pun About To Be Pretty. Following this release, he was contracted to record another theatrical score, for a staging of the play The Bundle by Edward Bond. The score was completed in the fall of 2006.

Immediately following the completion of the score, Ivan began recording a double album, with the two halves titled Point and Laugh respectively. While the double album was still in the early writing and demoing phase, Reese was engaged by his friend and fellow Calgary musician Kris Ellestad to release an album for Ellestad's newly established 6Sided Records label. Ellestad was hesitant to put out a double album as the label's first release, so Reese agreed to craft an album especially for the label. Using some of the material planned for Point/Laugh, and other material cobbled together from previous demos, the first proper Ganglion album, In An Incubator, was released in February 2007.

At this point, the Point/Laugh project was scrapped in favor of a new, more challenging undertaking. Reese decided to record a series of eight albums, to be released as a "concept box-set" upon their completion. Each album was given a title containing one letter from the word 'Ganglion' corresponding to the order of albums in the series, and the whole series would be titled semi-eponymously: GANGLION8. Much of the material for these eight albums was written and recorded in May 2007 at Reese's home in Half Moon Bay, Alberta. Go!, the first album of the series, was released the following fall via the internet to promote the project. This was followed by another musical score for the short film Wanderrordinary, directed by Matthew Thiel.

The second album in the GANGLION8 series, Away, was to be released in the early months of 2008, but Reese delayed it after an early preview of the album garnered mixed impressions. He then spent the summer rehearsing, performing, and recording with Sylvan Lake-based act Slake. This resulted in the Slake/Ganglion Split EP, released in the fall of 2008, featuring three revised versions of songs from Go!. The next release was the fifth album in the GANGLION8 series, titled Listen, released as a physical CD in March and online in April 2009. An unfinished form of the album was partially leaked to the internet in November 2008, though this did not negatively impact the album's sales.

In April 2009, a steady lineup of musicians began writing and rehearsing music specifically for live performance under the Ganglion name: Ivan Reese (bass blarinet, guitar), Owen Thelwall (saxophone), Megan Gerbrandt (drums, jawharp), Kiri Rix (vocals), Jessica Yeandle-Hignell (piano), Audrey Burch (piano, accordion), Mark Webber (guitar, banjo), and Kyle Cheadle (bass). They played two concerts in July 2009, one at the Mukwah Jamboree music festival and another at the Arbour Lake School.

In the fall of 2009, Reese recorded a score for a feature film titled Mirror rorriM, a dark comedy written by Sticks Sutton. In January 2010, Ivan Reese and Owen Thelwall performed a piece titled The Unlimited Dream Company at the High Performance Rodeo festival, as a part of the Soundasaurus showcase of experimental music. The performance entailed a number of electronic, mechanical, and organic sound sources: a radio signal generator, animatronic penguin and elephant, boiling kettle, power drill, bass feedback, saxophone, harmonica, duck decoys, children's toys, poetry, singing, and various odd tone-sources. In the summer of 2010, the album Away was finally released after an additional two years of revisions following its originally planned release date. It has become the most highly praised Ganglion album, and is considered by many to be the pinnacle of Reese's work as a recording artist. He also recorded two film scores in the summer, for the films Butt Ugly and Mapping Creativity.

On September 26, 2010, the Ganglion band were touring the United States when their tour van overturned on Highway 200 in Montana, killing nearly all members as well as the driver of an oncoming tractor trailer. While Ivan Reese survived the accident with minor injuries, the tragedy shook the Calgary independent music scene and constituted a great loss for the future of Canadian music. In January 2011, Reese gave his only performance following the death of his band, at Soundasaurus 2011. Titled Mary Everest Boole, it was a piece honouring the life and work of the titular mathematician, Mary Everest Boole. The performance featured specialized computer software which recorded Reese's voice, analyzing and rearranging his speech into musical phrases. At the performance, Reese announced his retirement from musical recording and performance, stating that he can no longer bear the weight performing following the deaths of his bandmates.

== Discography ==
=== Theatrical and film scores ===
- Alarum Within (as Ivan Reese & Owen Thelwall, Independent, 2005)
- The Bundle (as Ivan Reese, Independent, 2006)
- Wanderrordinary (as Ivan Reese, Independent, 2007)
- Mirror rorriM (as Ivan Reese, Independent, 2009)
- Butt Ugly (as Ivan Reese, Independent, 2010)
- Mapping Creativity (as Ivan Reese, Independent, 2010)

=== Studio albums ===
- About To Be Pretty (Societal Records, 2006)
- In An Incubator (6Sided Records, 2007)
- Go! (Societal Records, 2007)
- Slake/Ganglion Split EP (Societal Records, 2008)
- Listen (Societal Records, 2009)
- Away (Societal Records, 2010)
- Quadrate Honey and the Baleen Mysterians (Antithetical Records)

=== Live albums and compilations ===
- Abreast Of (Societal Records, 2011)
- Live at the Arbour Lake Sghool (Societal Records, 2011)

=== Non-album works ===
- The Unlimited Dream Company (multimedia performance piece, 2010)
- Mary Everest Boole (interactive-media performance piece, 2011)

=== Game scores ===
- A Shrinking Feeling (as Ivan Reese, Quintessent Games, 2011)
- Breakin (as Ivan Reese, Quintessent Games, 2011)
- Chord (as Ivan Reese, Quintessent Games, 2011)
