= Nothing but Hope and Passion =

German music webzine

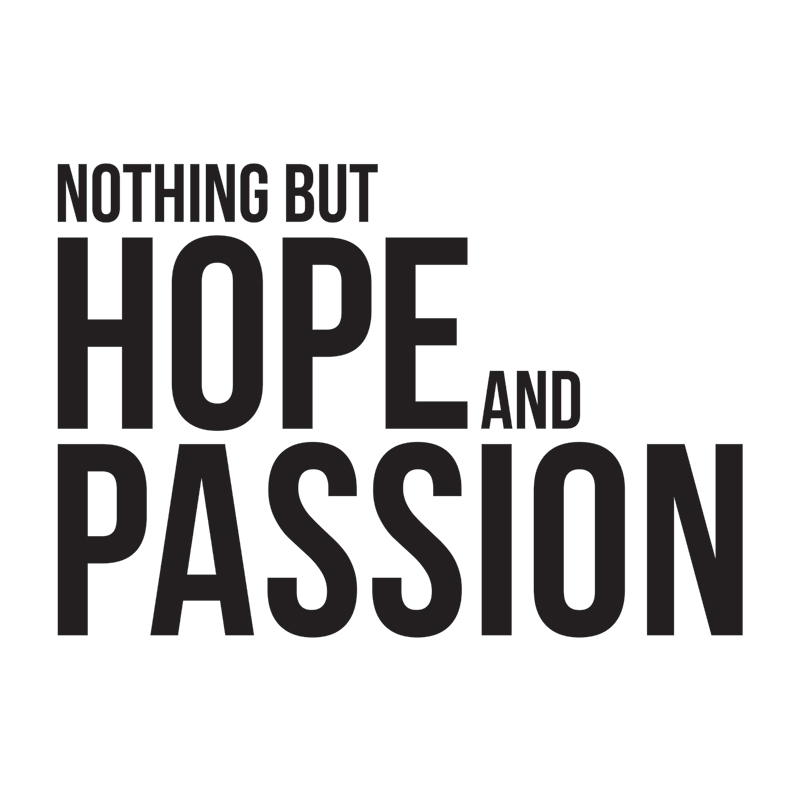
- Website type: Music and pop culture webzine
- Available in: English
- Owner: Robert Helbig
- Creator: Robert Helbig
- Website: nbhap.com
- Registration: No
- Launched: 2010; 16 years ago
- Current status: Active

Nothing but Hope and Passion (sometimes abbreviated as NBHAP) is a Berlin, Germany-based Internet publication devoted to music criticism, music news, artist interviews, guest mixes by artists as well as short films and "articles about life". NBHAP focuses on independent music, especially indie rock, indie pop, synthpop, chillwave, electronic music and post-rock. NBHAP was established in 2010.

== History ==
In early 2010, Robert Helbig, then currently about to study sociology in Jena, Germany, created NBHAP as a small site with one video post per day.

In early 2011, NBHAP started to also interview artists, write record reviews and launched its own online radio station "Hope and Passion FM" which broadcasts "Bass Stop", a program that is dedicated to dubstep, drum and bass and related genres.

Since 2012, NBHAP is part of the Vice content-network music.

In early 2013, Helbig relocated to Berlin and opened an office in the Berlin office. During this time NBHAP also started to publish show reviews and launched a category titled "Sound of the Day and Night".

== Content ==
Besides music news, reviews of records and shows, interviews, the "Sound of the Day and Night" and guest mixes by artists, every week NBHAP also names an "album of the week". Furthermore, short films and "articles about life" (which include articles from fields such as politics, psychology, philosophy as well as anti-homophobia and anti-discrimination) are published.
