= Savon Sanomat =

Daily newspaper published in Finland

- Type: Daily newspaper
- Format: Broadsheet
- Owner(s): Keskisuomalainen Oyj Group
- Publisher: Keskisuomalainen Oy
- Editor: Seppo Rönkkö
- Founded: 1907; 118 years ago
- Political alignment: Neutral
- Language: Finnish
- Headquarters: Kuopio, Finland
- Country: Finland
- Circulation: 55,000 (as of 2019)
- Sister newspapers: Keskisuomalainen
- ISSN: 0356-3510
- OCLC number: 719465273
- Website: www.savonsanomat.fi

Savon Sanomat is a Finnish language morning broadsheet newspaper published in Kuopio, Finland. The paper has been in circulation since 1907.

== History and profile ==
Savon Sanomat was established in 1907 as a media outlet of the Agrarian League. It has a liberal political stance. The paper is based in Kuopio and is published on a daily basis. It is part of the Keskisuomalainen Oyj Group. The company also owns Keskisuomalainen. Both papers are published by Keskisuomalainen Oy.

Savon Sanomat is published in broadsheet format.

== Circulation ==
The circulation of Savon Sanomat was 50,631 copies. It sold 67,212 copies in 2001. In 2003 the paper had a circulation of 65,000 copies. The 2004 circulation of the paper was 66,250 copies. The same year the paper had a readership of 179,000. The circulation of the paper was 64,471 copies in 2006.

Savon Sanomat had a circulation of 64,789 copies in 2007. Its circulation was 65,056 copies in 2008 and 64,113 copies in 2009. It was 61,546 copies in 2010 and 61,666 copies in 2011. Its circulation fell to 59,289 copies in 2012 and to 52,235 copies in 2013. The paper sold 55,000 copies in 2019.
