= Fullsteam Records =

- Founded: 2002
- Founder: Juha Kyyrö, Johannes Ylinen
- Genre: alternative, indie rock and punk/hardcore
- Country of origin: Finland
- Location: Helsinki
- Official website: fullsteam.fi

Fullsteam Records is an independent group of music companies whose activities include a record label, promotion and booking agency, festivals, a distribution company, rehearsal rooms, merchandising, publishing and management.

Awarded as the "independent label of the year" in Finland nearly ten times, Fullsteam Records is one of the most important sources of new music from Finland. Fullsteam Records has put out almost 200 releases from tens of Finnish artists and bands.

Fullsteam Agency is the main independent concert promoter and booking agency in Finland. International highlights include Prince, The National, The Prodigy, Fleet Foxes, The Flaming Lips, Social Distortion, RUSH, Wilco, Lily Allen and hundreds of others. The domestic roster features some 100 artists.

Supersounds Music is a music and merchandise distribution company founded in 2003. In Finland Supersounds Music distributes international labels as Play It Again Sam (PIAS), Rough Trade, Earache, AFM, Warp, Ministry Of Sound, Sub Pop etc. The company also distributes Finnish music internationally.

Fullsteam Publishing works in cooperation with Air Chrysalis Music Publishing.

Fullsteam also runs Scandinavia's largest rehearsal room studio called Indie Center with over 50 rooms, and has its own merchandising and management businesses.

== Some of the bands signed to Fullsteam Records ==
- Callisto
- Damn Seagulls
- Disco Ensemble
- Downstairs
- Ewert and The Two Dragons
- Flogging Molly (partially)
- Gogol Bordello (partially)
- Lapko
- Neøv
- No Shame
- Rubik
- Sister Flo
- Sweatmaster
- Ismo Alanko

1000 Records:

- Ceebrolistics
- Pedestrian´s Motor

Former artists:

- Abduktio
- Antero Lindgren
- Deep Insight
- Dust Eater Dogs
- Ganglion
- Koma
- Sela

== Bands contracted with Fullsteam Agency ==
- Abduktio
- April
- Branded Women
- Callisto
- Damn Seagulls
- Disco Ensemble
- Endstand
- Evilsons
- I Walk The Line
- Knucklebone Oscar
- Lapko
- Lordi
- No Shame
- Poisonblack
- Rotten Sound
- Rubik
- Shake
- Sister Flo
- Swallow the Sun
- The Valkyrians
- Them Shepherds
- Tundramatiks

== See also ==
- List of record labels
