= Kouvola =

- City
- Kouvolan kaupunki Kouvola stad City of Kouvola
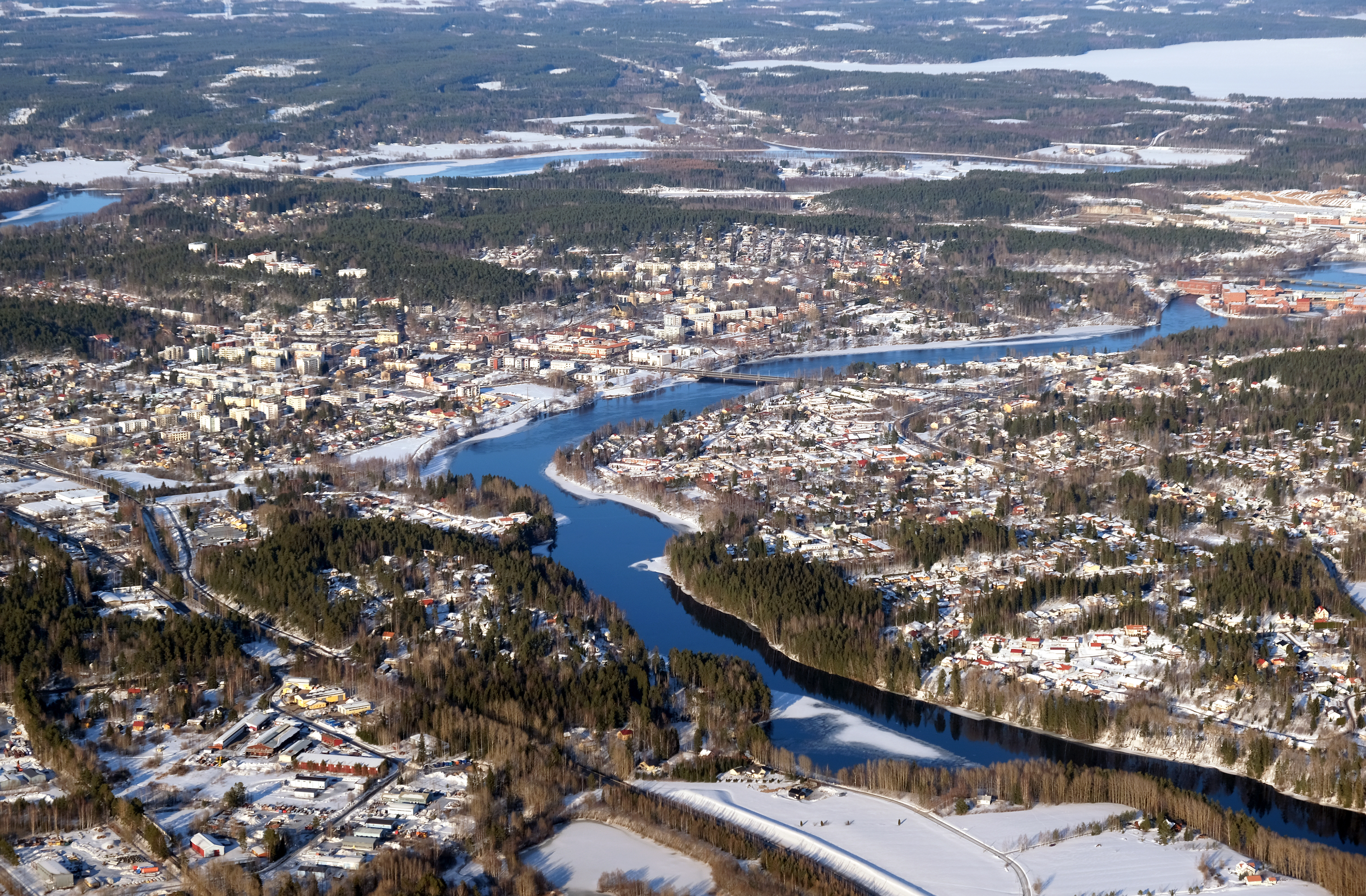
- Aerial photo of Kuusankoski area of Kouvola

- Coat of arms
- Nickname: Kouvostoliitto ("Koviet Union")
- Motto: Näköisesi paikka (The place you look like)
- Location of Kouvola in Finland
- Interactive map of Kouvola
- Coordinates: 60°52′05″N 026°42′15″E
- Country: Finland
- Region: Kymenlaakso
- Sub-region: Kouvola
- Charter: 1922
- City rights: 1960

Government
  - City manager: Marita Toikka

Area (2018-01-01)
  - City: 2,883.30 km^{2} (1,113.25 sq mi)
  - Land: 2,557.63 km^{2} (987.51 sq mi)
  - Water: 325.06 km^{2} (125.51 sq mi)
  - Rank: 22nd largest in Finland

Population (2025-12-31)
  - City: 77,625
  - Rank: 12th largest in Finland
  - Density: 30.35/km^{2} (78.6/sq mi)
  - Urban: 55,372
  - Metro: 60,776
  - Metro density: 267/km^{2} (690/sq mi)

Population by native language
  - Finnish: 93.4% (official)
  - Swedish: 0.4%
  - Others: 6.2%

Population by age
  - 0 to 14: 13%
  - 15 to 64: 58.4%
  - 65 or older: 28.6%
- Time zone: UTC+02:00 (EET)
  - Summer (DST): UTC+03:00 (EEST)
- Postal code: 45100
- Climate: Dfb
- Website: www.kouvola.fi/en/

Kouvola (Finnish pronunciation: [ˈkou̯ʋolɑ]) is a city in Finland and the administrative capital of Kymenlaakso. It is located in the southeastern interior of the country. The population of Kouvola is approximately 78,000. It is the 12th most populous municipality in Finland, and the 17th most populous urban area in the country.

Kouvola is located along the Kymijoki River in the region of Kymenlaakso, 62 kilometres (39 mi) kilometers east of Lahti, 87 kilometres (54 mi) west of Lappeenranta and 134 kilometres (83 mi) northeast of the capital, Helsinki. With Kotka, Kouvola is one of the capital centers and is the largest city in the Kymenlaakso region.

The urban area of Kouvola in the city centre itself is home to about 47,000 people. The city covers an area of 2,883.30 square kilometres (1,113.25 sq mi) of which 325.06 km^{2} (125.51 sq mi) is water. The population density is 30.35 inhabitants per square kilometre (78.6/sq mi). Kouvola is bordered by the municipalities of Hamina, Heinola, Iitti, Kotka, Lapinjärvi, Loviisa, Luumäki, Miehikkälä, Mäntyharju, Pyhtää and Savitaipale. Kouvola has over 450 lakes and, together with Mäntyharju, the Kouvola area includes the Repovesi National Park.

Kouvola, which had population growth as late as the 1980s, has suffered a loss of population due to migration since the 1990s. Over time, the loss has only deepened, so that at the end of the 2010s Kouvola had the highest rate of population loss by migration in Finland. Natural demographics have also trended downward; in 2017, more than 450 more people died in the city than new ones were born. Currently, the population of Kouvola is decreasing annually by about 800 inhabitants. The reasons for the emigration are thought to be largely due to job losses in the region. The city has placed expectations for economic recovery on various projects, such as the TikTok data center planned for Koria village.

== History ==
Coat of arms of Kouvola

(1952–2008)

(2009-)

In the Middle Ages, the Kouvola region were borderlands between the provinces of Uusimaa, Häme and Karelia. The Kymijoki River served as the border river between Swedish Empire and the Russian Empire from 1743 to 1809.

The village of Kouvola has been inhabited since the Middle Ages, and it has belonged alternately to the parishes of Hollola, Iitti and Valkeala. However, the actual development did not start until the 1870s when the Riihimäki–Saint Petersburg railway line was built and Kouvola became a railway junction. In the next decade, the Savonia railway was built from Kouvola to the north and the Kotka line to the south, resulting in Kouvola becoming one of the busiest railway junctions in Finland. Over time, Kouvola developed into an important pulp-producing, paper-milling and printing centre and even had a leading industrial engineering sector.

In 1918, conflict between the Red and White factions raged heavily during the Finnish Civil War. More than 200 people were killed in the area during the fighting.

As a result of the railway, Kouvola was heavily built. In 1922 it was separated from the municipality of Valkeala and gained commercial rights immediately the following year. The city of Kouvola was established in 1960. Kouvola was annexed to Viipuri Province in 1922–1945 but in 1940 and 1944, most of Viipuri County was ceded to the Soviet Union, and the remaining areas were formed into Kymi Province in 1945. Kouvola had also become an administrative center; As the capital of Kymen County, it operated from 1955 until the 1997 county reform.

In January 2009, the six municipalities of Kouvola, Kuusankoski, Elimäki, Anjalankoski, Valkeala and Jaala were consolidated, forming the new municipality of Kouvola. Kouvola has also assumed the slogan Kymijoen kaupunki (the town of Kymijoki) previously used by Anjalankoski.

In March 2026, two Ukrainian drones fell in Kouvola. Prime Minister Petteri Orpo told the media that the drones likely came from Ukraine, which has been conducting attacks on Russian territory along the border with Finland.

== Culture ==
- The language spoken in the Kouvola area is based on the Southeastern Häme dialect, which belongs to the Häme dialects.
- The name itself derives from Old Finnish kouvo, meaning bear. The arms are Sable, an escarbuncle Or, base wavy Argent.
- The nickname Kouvostoliitto ("Koviet Union") is a humorous, self-deprecating play on words used for Kouvola, combining the city's name with Neuvostoliitto (the Soviet Union); the nickname stems from the city's concrete architecture, which reminds many of the stark style characteristic of the Soviet era—namely, Brutalism.
- Verla factory, which is a UNESCO World Heritage Site, is located near Kouvola.
- The newspapers Kouvolan Sanomat and Keskilaakso are published in Kouvola.
- The third biggest Amusement park in Finland, called Tykkimäki is located in Kouvola.

=== Province History of Kouvola ===
- Viipuri Province (1922–1945)
- Kymi Province (1945–1997)
- Southern Finland Province (1997–2009)
- Kymenlaakso (2009–)

== Sports ==
Kouvola has multiple clubs that compete in the highest tier of various sports. KooKoo plays ice hockey in the men's Finnish top league SM-Liiga. Kouvolan Pallonlyöjät (KPL) is considered one of the best pesäpallo teams in the country, having won five championships in the Finnish men's top flight Superpesis. Kouvot is the city's basketball club that has won four top flight championships and currently plays in the men's Korisliiga, while the women's team Kouvottaret plays in the second tier I divisioona. Kuusankosken Puhti plays pesäpallo in the women's second tier Ykköspesis.

MyPa from the industrial village of Myllykoski now part of Kouvola achieved success in football during the 1990s and 2000s winning the Finnish men's top league Veikkausliiga once and the Finnish Cup three times, and is now playing in the fourth tier of Finnish football Kakkonen. Kouvolan Jalkapallo (KJP) is the biggest football youth team in Kouvola with over 800 members, while their adult men's and women's teams both play in the fifth tier, Kolmonen and Naisten Nelonen respectively. Sudet was a multi-sports club from Vyborg and Helsinki that moved to Kouvola in 1962. They had achieved success in both bandy and football prior to the move, winning the men's bandy championship 14 times and the Finnish football championship once. The club is currently active in Kouvola only in men's floorball, playing in the Finnish lower leagues, but their namesake Wiipurin Sudet is one of the top women's clubs in bandy, operating in Lappeenranta. Valkealan Kajo is a multi-sports club from Valkeala that has achieved success in volleyball, winning the women's championship in 1998.

Kouvola is active in winter sports; It has the Palomäki Ski Jump Center for ski jumping, and multiple tracks for cross-country skiing throughout the town during the winter. Orienteering is also popular in the summertime.

== Local government ==
City Council of Kouvola
Party	Seats
Social Democratic Party	16
National Coalition Party	13
Centre Party	9
Green League	6
Finns Party	5
Christian Democrats	4
Sitoutumattomat (Independent)	2
Left Alliance	2
Suur-Kouvolan sitoutumattomat	2

== Climate ==
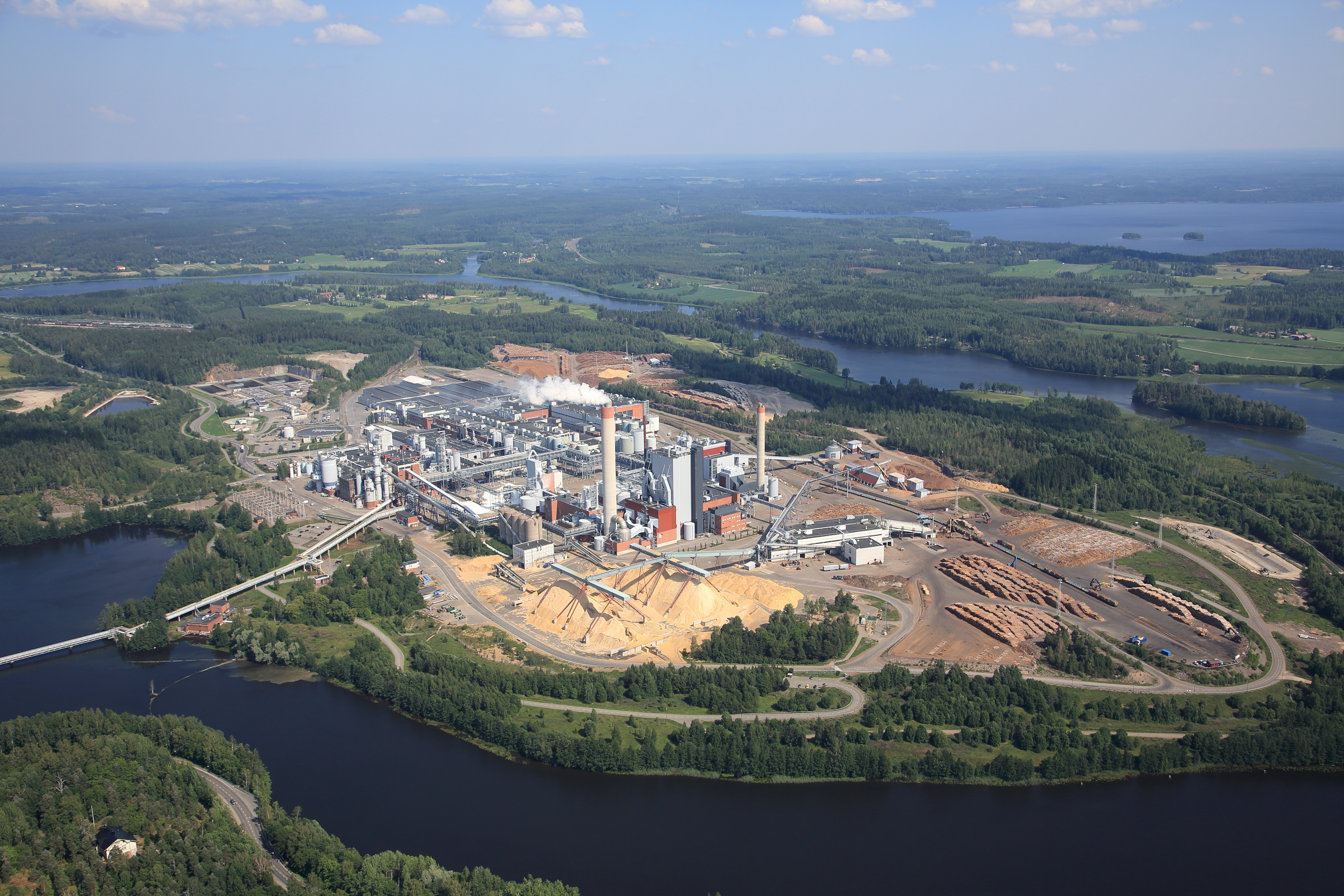
UPM Kymi (Paper mill)

Kouvola has humid continental climate (Dfb).The city has four distinct seasons, the amount of precipitation is relatively uniform throughout the year. The driest season is spring. Summers are generally relatively warm as the city is considered to be one of the hottest cities in Finland as it has had the most days with "helle" (temperatures above 25 °C or 77 °F) since 2000. Winters are colder than cities located in the coastal areas of Finland because of its location further inland, meaning the marine effect doesn't affect the city as much than those nearer the sea. This also means that the summers are warmer due to it being further inland as the sea effect is making the summer temperatures slightly cooler in coastal areas. The average annual temperature is 5.4 °C (41.7 °F). The highest ever recorded temperature in the station was 34.5 °C (94.1 °F), on July 28, 2010. The lowest ever recorded was −37.3 °C (−35.1 °F). The city has a significant rainfall throughout the year and even in the driest month the precipitation stays over 30 millimetres (1.2 in) a month. The average duration of sunshine per year is 1,658 hours. Kouvola Utti airport weather station has on average somewhat lower average temperatures than in the city.

Climate data for Kouvola Utti airport, normals 1991–2020, extremes 1960–present
Month	Jan	Feb	Mar	Apr	May	Jun	Jul	Aug	Sep	Oct	Nov	Dec	Year
Record high °C (°F)	7.6 (45.7)	8.7 (47.7)	15.6 (60.1)	24.9 (76.8)	30.2 (86.4)	32.2 (90.0)	34.1 (93.4)	33.0 (91.4)	28.7 (83.7)	17.7 (63.9)	12.7 (54.9)	9.7 (49.5)	34.1 (93.4)
Mean daily maximum °C (°F)	−3.4 (25.9)	−3.4 (25.9)	1.3 (34.3)	8.3 (46.9)	15.9 (60.6)	20.2 (68.4)	22.9 (73.2)	20.8 (69.4)	14.9 (58.8)	7.5 (45.5)	2.1 (35.8)	−1.1 (30.0)	8.8 (47.9)
Daily mean °C (°F)	−6.1 (21.0)	−6.4 (20.5)	−2.3 (27.9)	3.7 (38.7)	10.6 (51.1)	15.2 (59.4)	18.0 (64.4)	16.1 (61.0)	10.8 (51.4)	4.7 (40.5)	0.1 (32.2)	−3.5 (25.7)	5.1 (41.2)
Mean daily minimum °C (°F)	−9.1 (15.6)	−9.7 (14.5)	−6.3 (20.7)	−0.8 (30.6)	4.7 (40.5)	10.0 (50.0)	13.0 (55.4)	11.6 (52.9)	7.1 (44.8)	2.0 (35.6)	−2.2 (28.0)	−6.0 (21.2)	1.2 (34.2)
Record low °C (°F)	−37.3 (−35.1)	−34.9 (−30.8)	−29.3 (−20.7)	−17.5 (0.5)	−6.4 (20.5)	−0.5 (31.1)	3.0 (37.4)	−0.1 (31.8)	−5.4 (22.3)	−14.9 (5.2)	−22.3 (−8.1)	−35.0 (−31.0)	−37.3 (−35.1)
Average precipitation mm (inches)	54 (2.1)	45 (1.8)	42 (1.7)	31 (1.2)	41 (1.6)	63 (2.5)	69 (2.7)	71 (2.8)	63 (2.5)	72 (2.8)	66 (2.6)	64 (2.5)	681 (26.8)
Average precipitation days	12	10	9	7	8	9	9	10	10	12	12	13	121
Mean monthly sunshine hours	28	62	135	187	275	255	273	214	135	60	23	14	1,658
Source: FMI climatologial normals for Finland 1991-2020

Climate data for Kouvola Anjala (1991–2020 normals, extremes 1959–present)
Month	Jan	Feb	Mar	Apr	May	Jun	Jul	Aug	Sep	Oct	Nov	Dec	Year
Record high °C (°F)	7.6 (45.7)	8.8 (47.8)	16.1 (61.0)	23.8 (74.8)	29.8 (85.6)	32.4 (90.3)	33.5 (92.3)	31.9 (89.4)	27.9 (82.2)	19.2 (66.6)	13.4 (56.1)	9.7 (49.5)	33.5 (92.3)
Mean maximum °C (°F)	3.7 (38.7)	3.8 (38.8)	8.9 (48.0)	18.1 (64.6)	24.5 (76.1)	27.2 (81.0)	28.8 (83.8)	27.2 (81.0)	21.7 (71.1)	14.4 (57.9)	8.8 (47.8)	4.8 (40.6)	29.9 (85.8)
Mean daily maximum °C (°F)	−2.7 (27.1)	−2.6 (27.3)	2.1 (35.8)	8.9 (48.0)	16.2 (61.2)	20.5 (68.9)	23.2 (73.8)	21.3 (70.3)	15.4 (59.7)	8.2 (46.8)	2.8 (37.0)	−0.5 (31.1)	9.4 (48.9)
Daily mean °C (°F)	−5.3 (22.5)	−5.7 (21.7)	−2.0 (28.4)	4.0 (39.2)	10.4 (50.7)	15.0 (59.0)	17.9 (64.2)	16.0 (60.8)	10.9 (51.6)	5.1 (41.2)	0.7 (33.3)	−2.7 (27.1)	5.4 (41.7)
Mean daily minimum °C (°F)	−8.4 (16.9)	−9.1 (15.6)	−6.0 (21.2)	−0.6 (30.9)	4.2 (39.6)	9.4 (48.9)	12.3 (54.1)	11.1 (52.0)	6.8 (44.2)	2.2 (36.0)	−1.6 (29.1)	−5.3 (22.5)	1.3 (34.3)
Mean minimum °C (°F)	−22.2 (−8.0)	−22.2 (−8.0)	−17.4 (0.7)	−7.7 (18.1)	−3.1 (26.4)	2.3 (36.1)	6.5 (43.7)	4.0 (39.2)	−0.8 (30.6)	−6.3 (20.7)	−11.1 (12.0)	−17.1 (1.2)	−25.8 (−14.4)
Record low °C (°F)	−37.3 (−35.1)	−36.0 (−32.8)	−33.5 (−28.3)	−22.5 (−8.5)	−8.2 (17.2)	−3.0 (26.6)	1.4 (34.5)	−3.1 (26.4)	−7.9 (17.8)	−16.3 (2.7)	−23.3 (−9.9)	−36.6 (−33.9)	−37.3 (−35.1)
Average precipitation mm (inches)	52 (2.0)	45 (1.8)	40 (1.6)	32 (1.3)	38 (1.5)	64 (2.5)	66 (2.6)	76 (3.0)	61 (2.4)	72 (2.8)	67 (2.6)	64 (2.5)	677 (26.7)
Average precipitation days	12.0	10	8	7	7	10	9	10	9	11	12	13	118
Source 1: https://helda.helsinki.fi/handle/10138/336063
Source 2: https://kilotavu.com/asema-taulukko.php?asema=101194

== Demographics ==
=== Population ===
The city of Kouvola has 77,625 inhabitants, making it the 12th most populous municipality in Finland.

Population size 1990–2025
Year	Population
1990	94,352
1995	94,138
2000	91,550
2005	89,924
2010	88,072
2015	85,855
2020	81,187
2025	77,625

=== Languages ===
Population by
mother tongue (2025)
1. Finnish (93.4%)
2. Russian (2.00%)
3. Ukrainian (0.60%)
4. Estonian (0.50%)
5. Swedish (0.40%)
6. Arabic (0.30%)
7. English (0.20%)
8. Other (2.60%)

Kouvola is a monolingual Finnish-speaking municipality. The majority of the population, 72,506 persons (93.4%), spoke Finnish as their first language. In addition, the number of Swedish speakers was 275 persons (0.4%) of the population. Foreign languages were spoken by 6.2% of the population. As English and Swedish are compulsory school subjects, functional bilingualism or trilingualism acquired through language studies is not uncommon.

At least 40 different languages are spoken in Kouvola. The most commonly spoken foreign languages are Russian (2.0%), Ukrainian (0.6%), Estonian (0.5%) and Arabic (0.3%).

The language spoken in the Kouvola area is based on the Southeast Häme dialect, which belongs to the Tavastian dialects.

=== Immigration ===
Population by country of birth (2025)
Country of birth	Population	%
Finland	72,825	93.8
Soviet Union	1,346	1.7
Estonia	354	0.5
Ukraine	288	0.4
Russia	246	0.3
Sweden	220	0.3
Thailand	200	0.3
Turkey	182	0.2
Philippines	117	0.2
Somalia	113	0.1
Other	2,934	3.8

As of 2024, there were 4,731 persons with a foreign background living in Kouvola, or 6% of the population. (Note: Statistics Finland classifies a person as having a "foreign background" if both parents or the only known parent were born abroad.) The number of residents who were born abroad was 4,608, or 6% of the population. The number of persons with foreign citizenship living in Kouvola was 3,008. Most foreign-born citizens came from the former Soviet Union, Estonia, Russia and Ukraine.

The relative share of immigrants in Kouvola's population is below to the national average. However, the city's new residents are increasingly of foreign origin. This will increase the proportion of foreign residents in the coming years.

=== Religion ===
In 2023, the Evangelical Lutheran Church was the largest religious group with 69.2% of the population of Kouvola. Other religious groups accounted for 2.0% of the population. 28.8% of the population had no religious affiliation.

== International relations ==
=== Twin towns and sister cities ===
Kouvola is twinned with:

- Balatonfüred, Veszprém County, Hungary
- Vologda, Vologda Oblast, Russia
- Mülheim an der Ruhr, North Rhine-Westphalia, Germany
- Poltava, Poltava Oblast, Ukraine

== Regionalization ==
Kouvola regional councils.

Region Committee	Population	Area km^{2}	Population Density
Kouvola central (1)	30,185	44.88	672.57
Kuusankoski (2)	20,647	692.07	29.83
Anjalankoski (3)	15,000	752.92	19.92
Valkeala (4)	11,433	1003.72	11.39
Elimäki (5)	7,900	391.74	20.17
5 region Committee	85,165	2,885.33	29.52

Jaala is only one does not form its own regional committee, but is part of the Kuusankoski regional committee.

== Notable people ==
Map of territorial changes of Kouvola and Kuusankoski. Most of the area of old Kouvola was separated from Valkeala, except for the western parts of the city, which were separated from Kuusankoski.

- Aleksanteri Hakaniemi (Singer and YouTuber)
- Ari Koivunen (Heavy metal singer)
- Arto Bryggare (Former hurdling athlete)
- Atso Askonen (Former ice hockey player)
- Hannu Salama (Finnish author)
- Jari Lindström (Finnish politician)
- Jarkko A. Immonen (Former ice hockey player)
- Juhani Aaltonen (Jazz saxophonist and flautist)
- Jukka Lemmetty (Author and illustrator)
- Kaarle Viikate (Finnish musician and metal band Founder of the Viikate)
- Niilo Halonen (Former ski jumper)
- Roope Tonteri (Finnish snowboarder)
- Timo Lahti (Speedway rider)
- Timo Susi (Former ice hockey player)
- Toni Gardemeister (Professional rally driver)
- Ville Nousiainen (Cross-country skier)

== Gallery ==
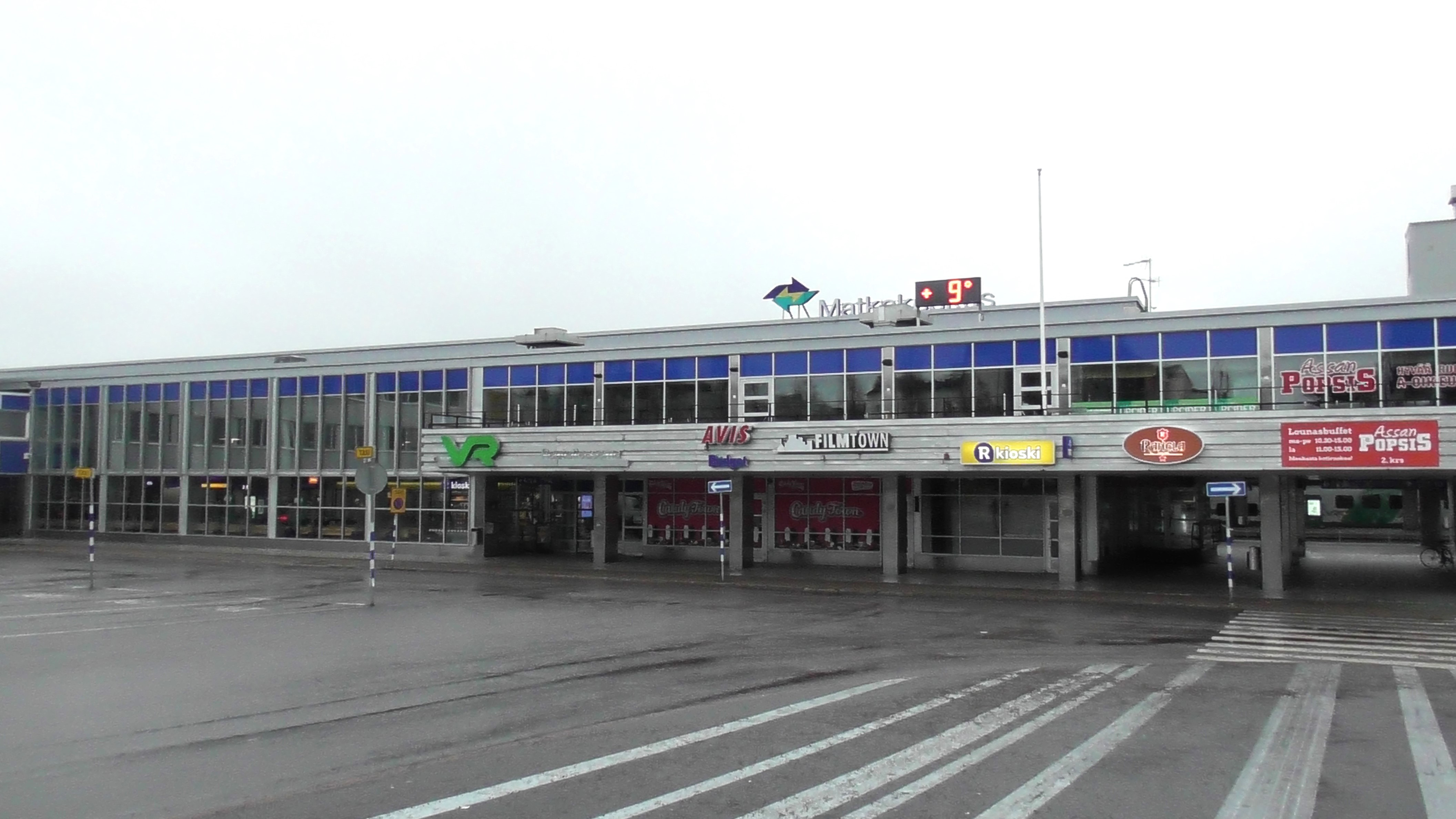
Kouvola railway station

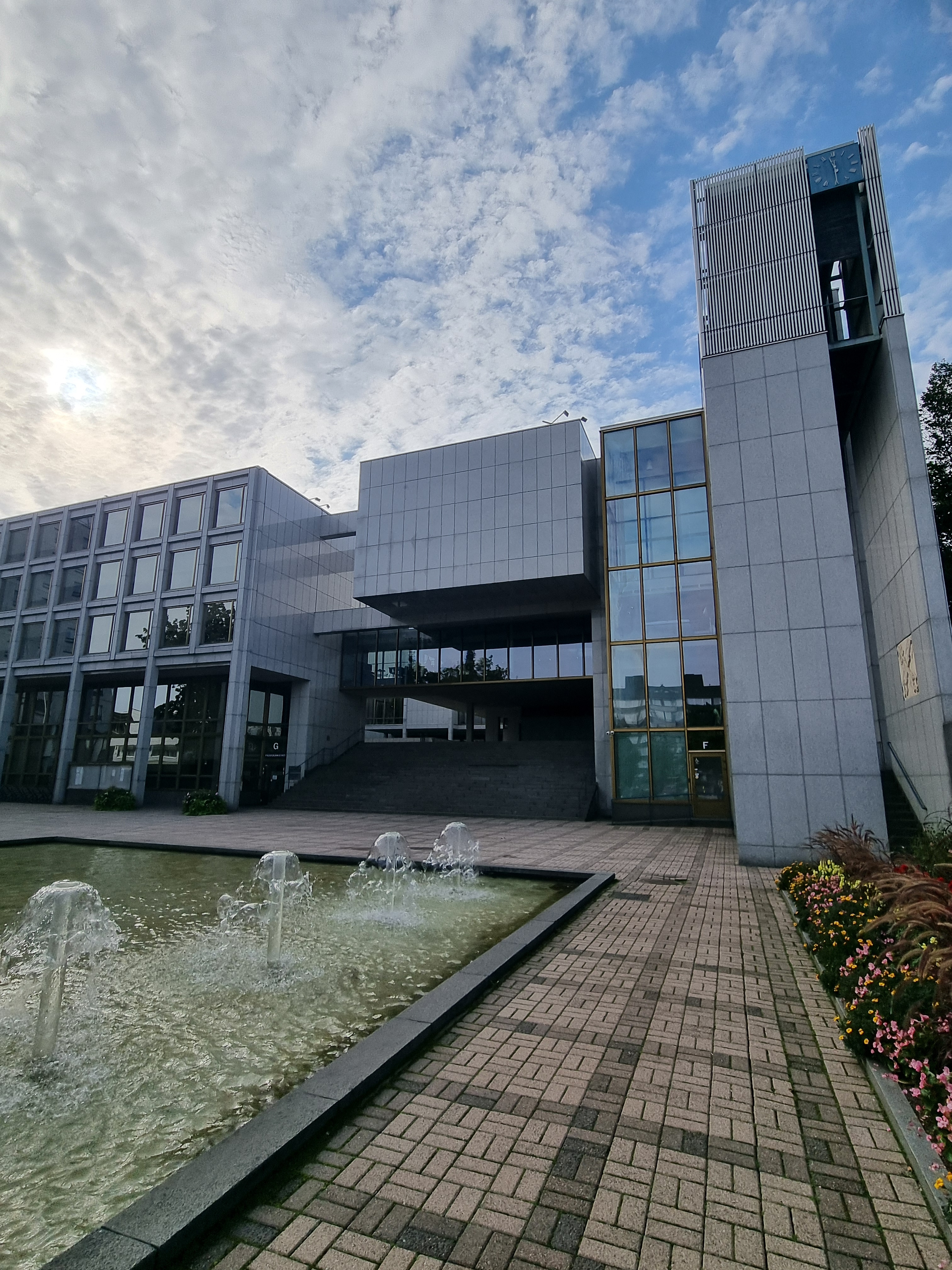
Kouvola's City Hall

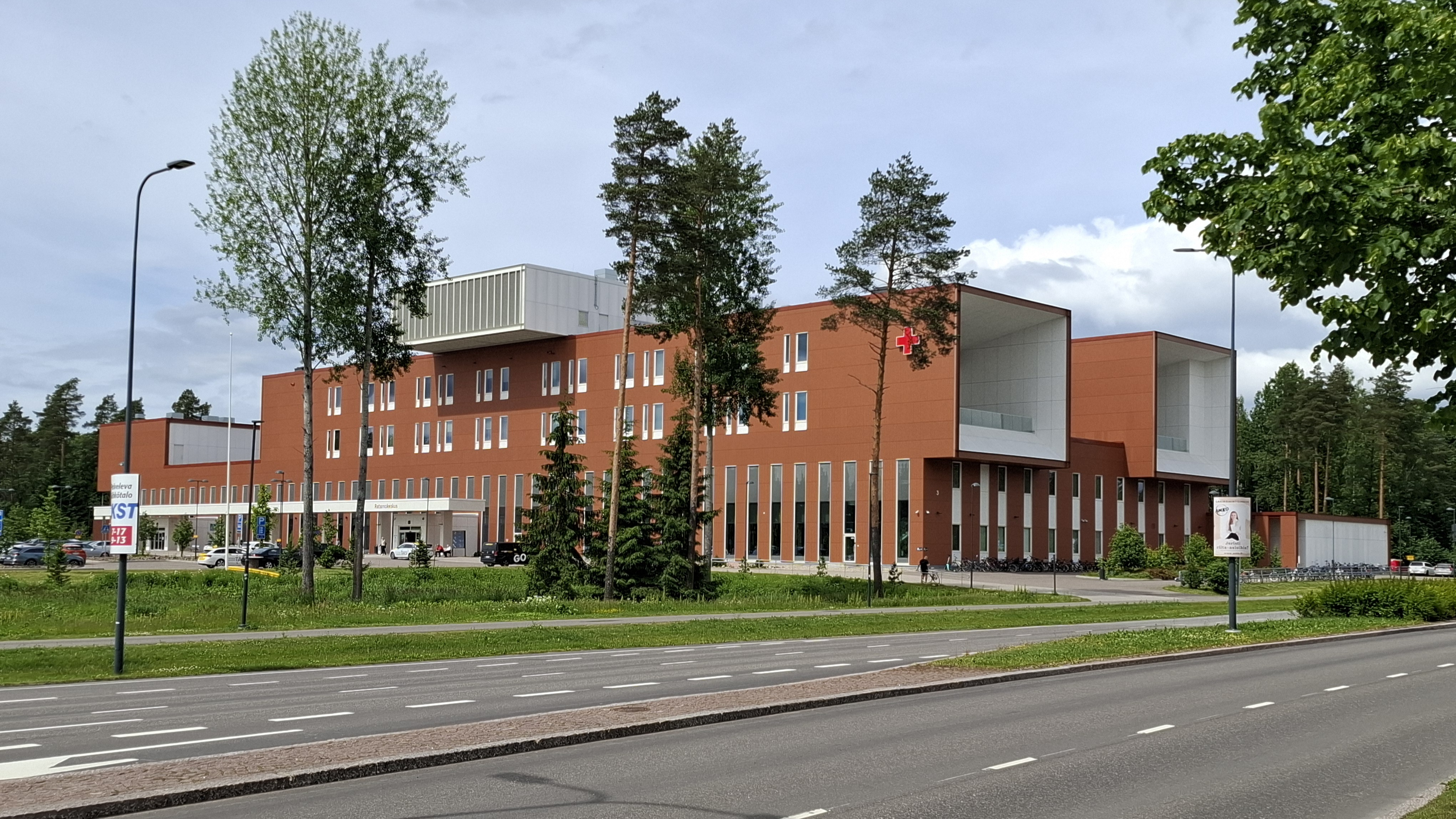
Ratamokeskus, Health facility

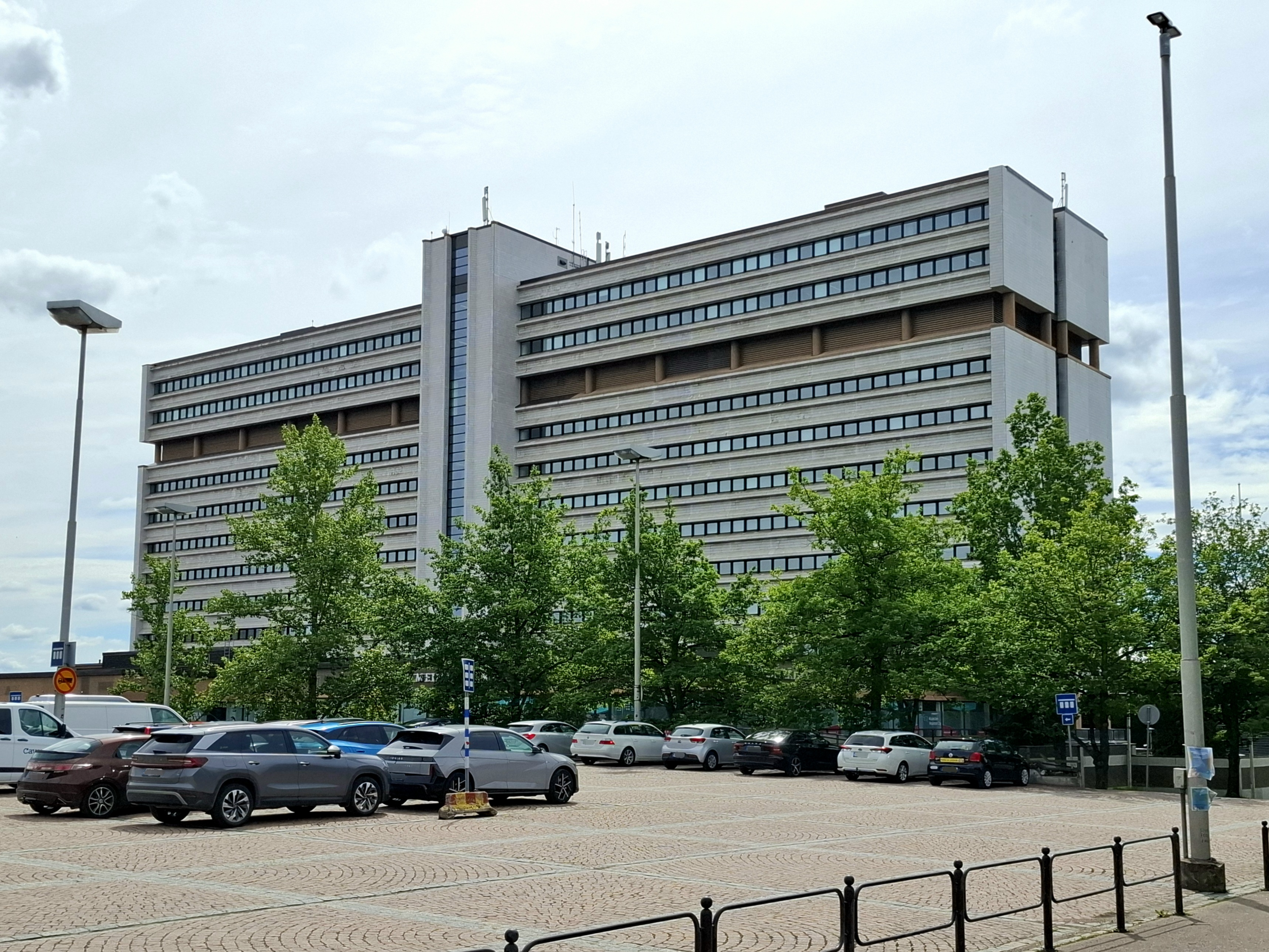
Pohjolatalo, an office building in the center of Kouvola

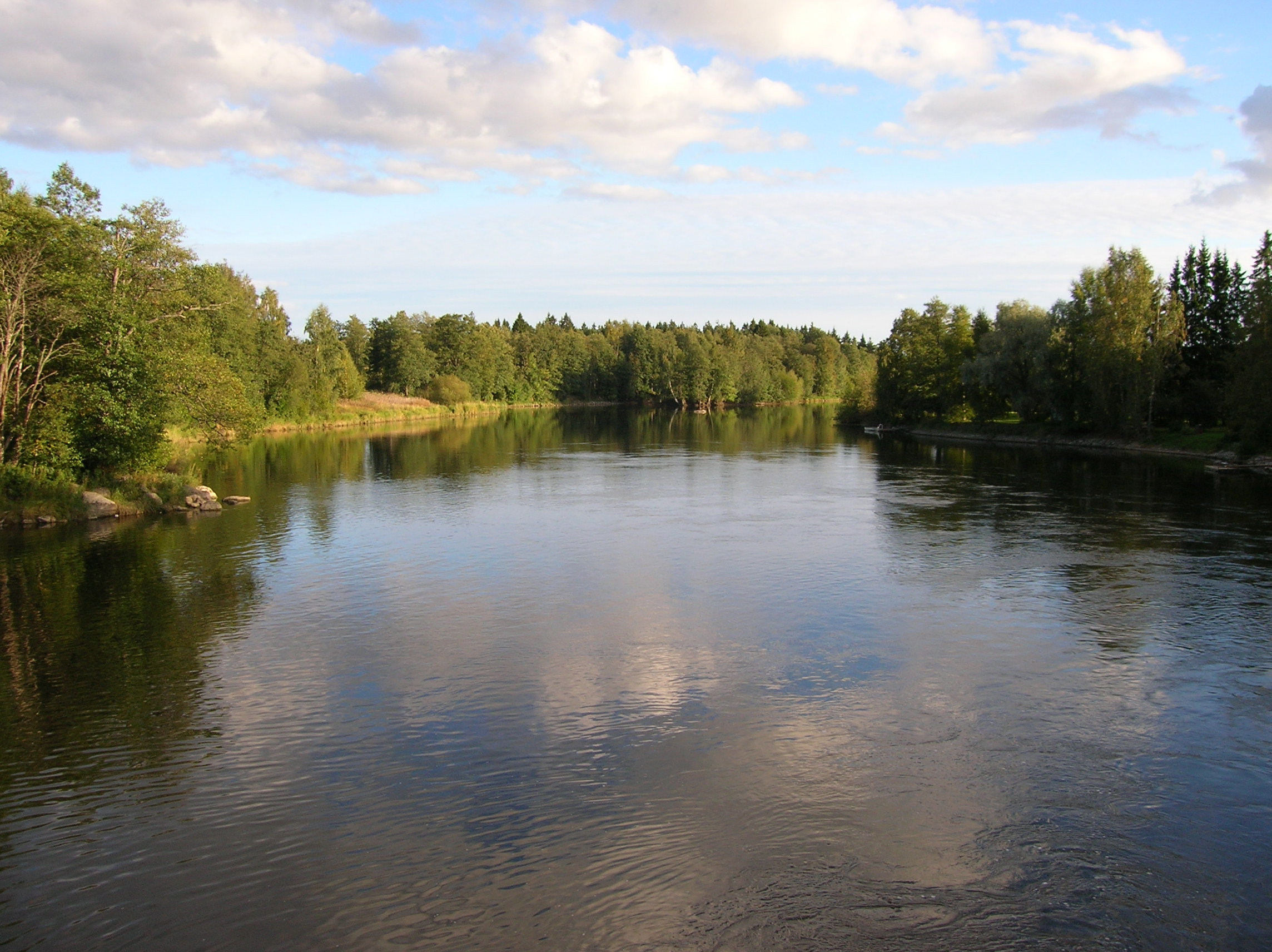
Kymi River

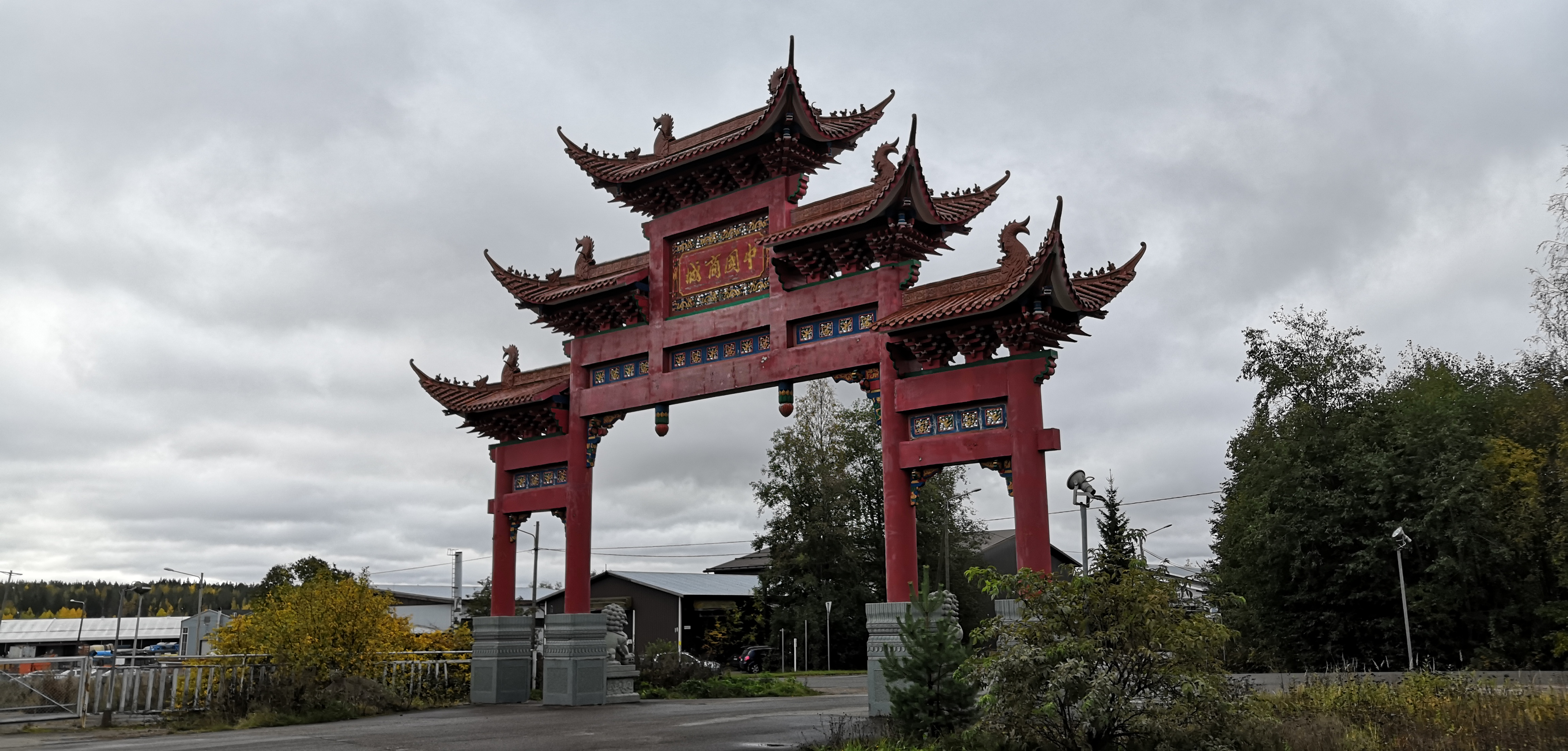
A paifang in Kouvola

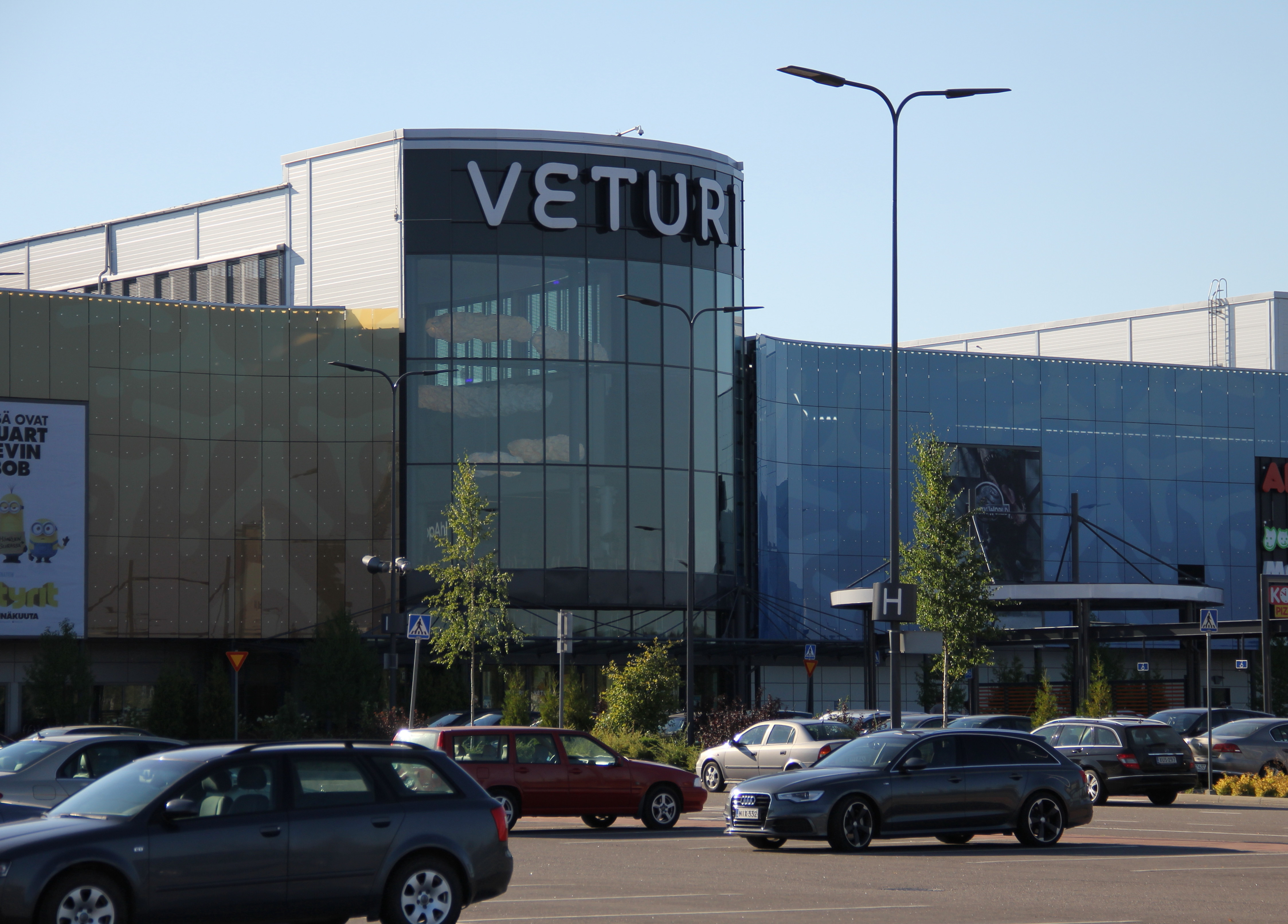
Veturi, Shopping center

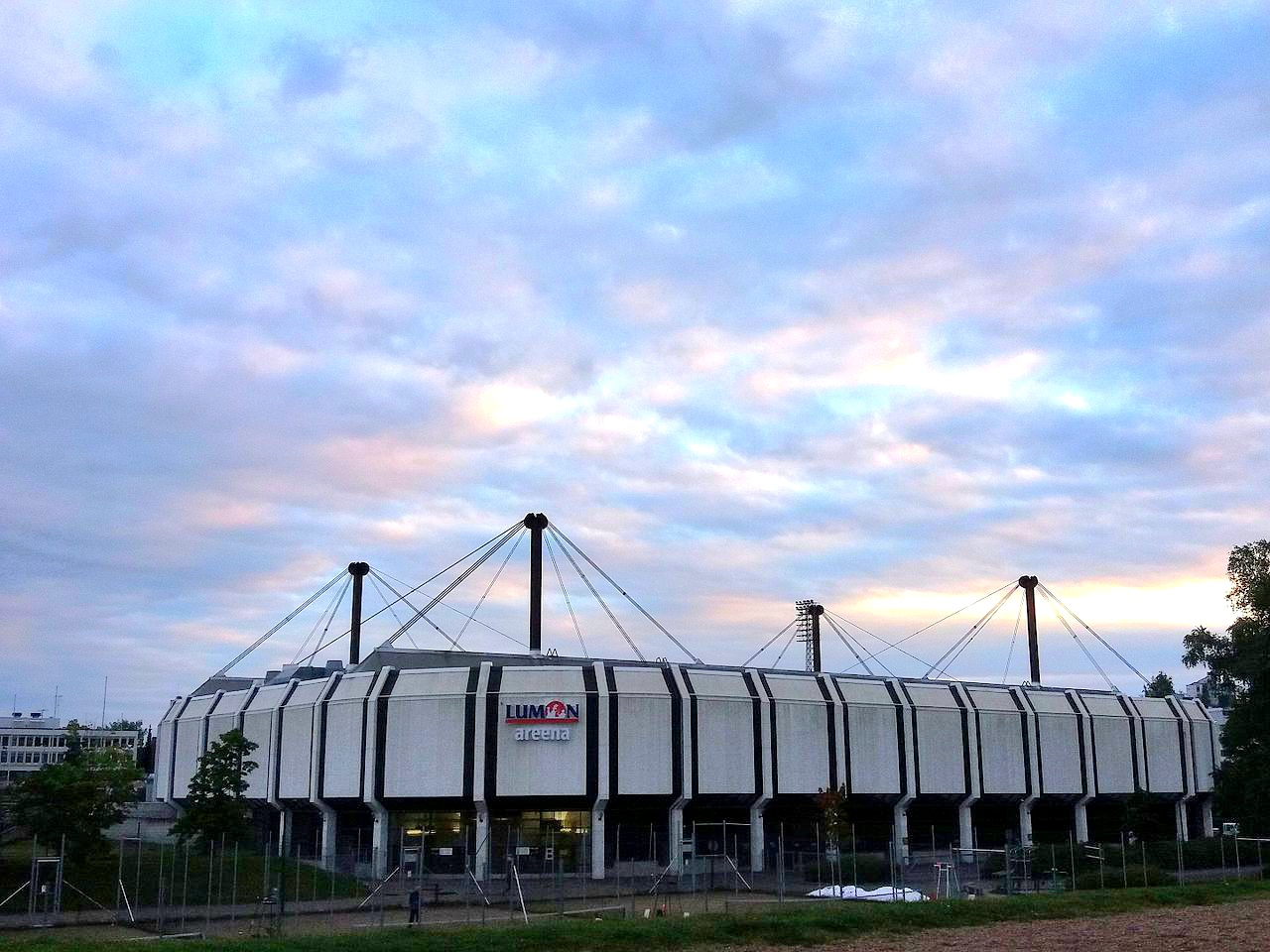
Lumon arena

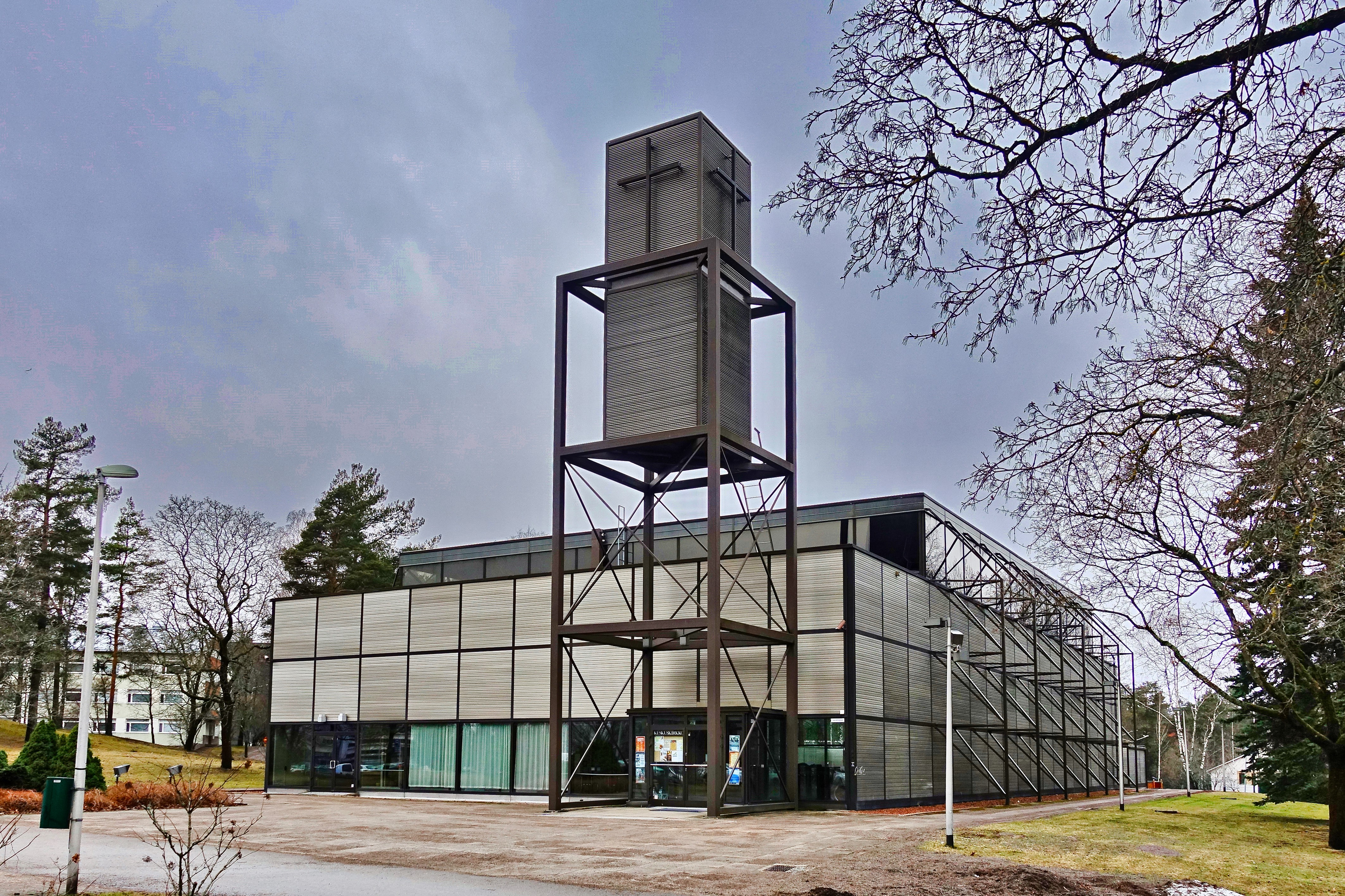
Kouvola Central Church

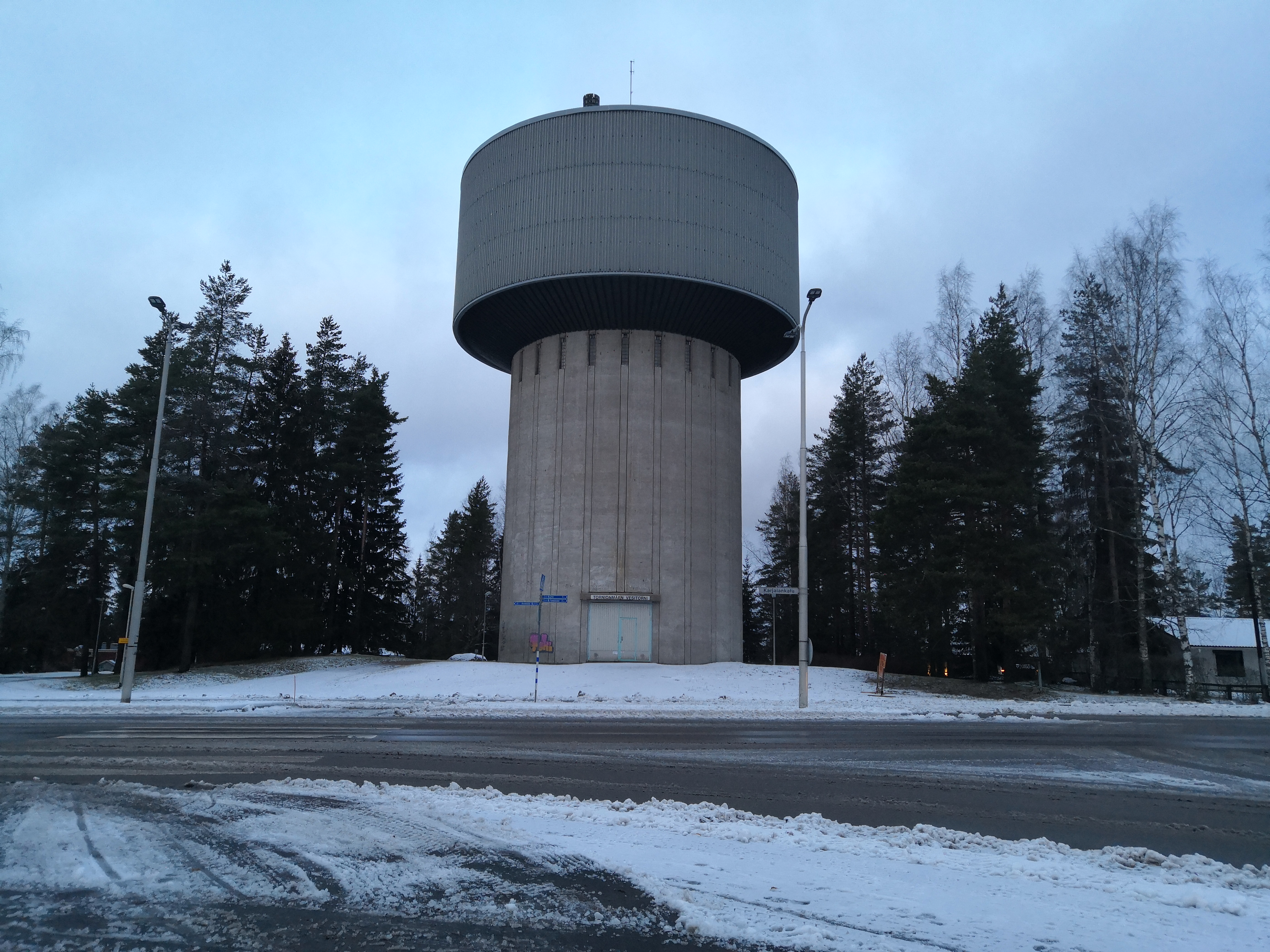
Tornionmäki Water Tower
