= Keskilaakso =

- Type: Newspaper
- Editor-in-chief: Stiina Kokkonen
- Founded: 1931; 94 years ago (Kymen Keskilaakso)
- Language: Finnish
- Circulation: 4,651 (2013)
- Website: Keskilaakso

Keskilaakso is a newspaper published typically on Tuesdays and Thursdays in Kouvola, Finland.

== History ==
Keskilaakso was established in 1931 under the name Kymen Keskilaakso. First publishing in November 1931, at that time, the editor-in-chief was F. A. Havola. In 1975 the name became Anjalankosken Sanomat and in 2007 the newspaper was renamed to Keskilaakso.
