= Jukka Lemmetty =

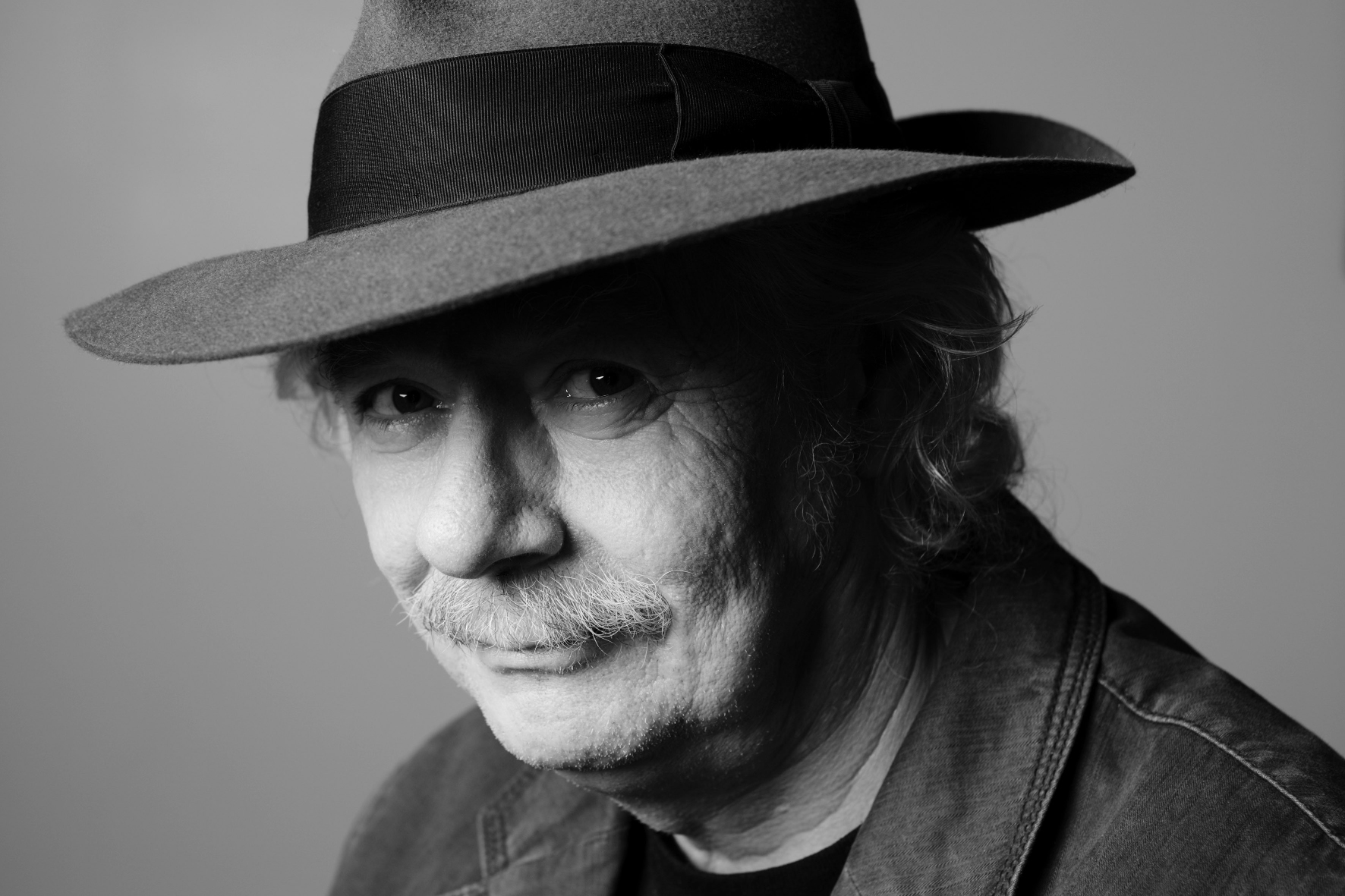
Jukka Lemmetty

Jukka Lemmetty is a Finnish author and illustrator of children's books, textbooks, and reference books.

== Biography ==
Lemmetty was born in 1951, in Kouvola, Finland, went to school in Rovaniemi, Finland and studied at the Finnish and Munich Academies of Fine Art. He worked as a painter until 1980, when Weilin and Göös publishers commissioned his artwork for their Tapiola publications. He has illustrated a number of children's books and text books, most notably the Happy ABC textbooks which have been used in Finnish schools. He has also written a number of children's books.

== Children's books ==
Lemmetty wrote Alpo, a series of books published by Tammi Publishing Company about Alpo the dog and his adventures. Two Alpo books have been released to date: "Alpo finds Home" in 2010, and "Alpo finds Alma" in 2011. The latter has generated an e-book app for smartphones and tablet devices by Tapisodes.

Lemmetty illustratedWare Bears in Space (by Hannele Huovi) in 2011.

Histamiini is a character which has become well known from and television and children's books written by author Raili Mikkanen. Of this series, Jukka Lemmetty has illustrated "Histamiini saves Christmas" (2001) and "Histamiini builds a raft" (2003).

== Awards and honours ==
- Amer Literature award, 1990
- The Finnish Cultural Foundation, "Scholarship for Children's Picture Book", 1997
- Otava Writer Fellowships, written works of 1996, 1997 and 1998
- Illustrators Rooster Award 2007
