= Atso Askonen =

Finnish ice hockey forward

- Born: February 20, 1970 (age 55); Kouvola, Finland
- Height: 5 ft 11 in (180 cm)
- Weight: 183 lb (83 kg; 13 st 1 lb)
- Position: Forward
- Shot: Left
- Played for: KooKoo
- Playing career: 1989–2002

Atso Askonen (born February 20, 1970) is a Finnish retired professional ice hockey forward.

Askonen played five games for KooKoo during the 1989–90 SM-liiga season where he scored no points. He continued to play with KooKoo in the 1. Divisioona until 1996.

After retiring in 2002, Askonen returned to KooKoo as head coach of their Jr. C and Jr. B teams. He later became an assistant coach for Pelicans' Jr. B team.
