= Histamiini =

Fictional horse

Histamiini is a small horse which has become familiar from the television and Raili Mikkanen's children's books. Histamiini's most famous appearances are in the TV Christmas Calendar in 1980 and 1985. Histamiini's signature phrase is Klip-klop, klip-klop, hevonen on pop ("Clip-clop, clip-clop, a horse is pop").

== Books ==
- Histamiini hukassa ("Histamiini is missing"), Otava, 1982
- Histamiinin hiihtoretki ("Histamiini's ski trip"), Otava, 1983
- Histamiini merellä ("Histamiini at sea"), Otava, 1984
- Histamiini ratsupoliisina ("Histamiini as a mounted policeman"), Otava, 1985
- Histamiini löytää timantin ("Histamiini finds a diamond"), Otava, 1986
- Histamiinista tulee kummi ("Histamiini becomes a godfather"), Otava, 1988
- Histamiini, joulun sankari ("Histamiini, the hero of Christmas"), Tammi, 2001
- Histamiini rakentaa lautan ("Histamiini builds a barge"), Tammi, 2003 (Keltanokkasarja)
- Ystävämme Histamiini ("Our friend Histamiini"), Tammi, 2004

== TV series ==
- Histamiinin joulukalenteri (1980)
- Histamiinin joulukalenteri (1985)
- Histamiini ja merenneidon aarre (1989)
- Histamiini ja Pirpo, Salaratsupoliisit (1993)
